= Battle of Glarus (1799) =

War of the Second Coalition battle

- Part of Suvorov's Swiss campaign
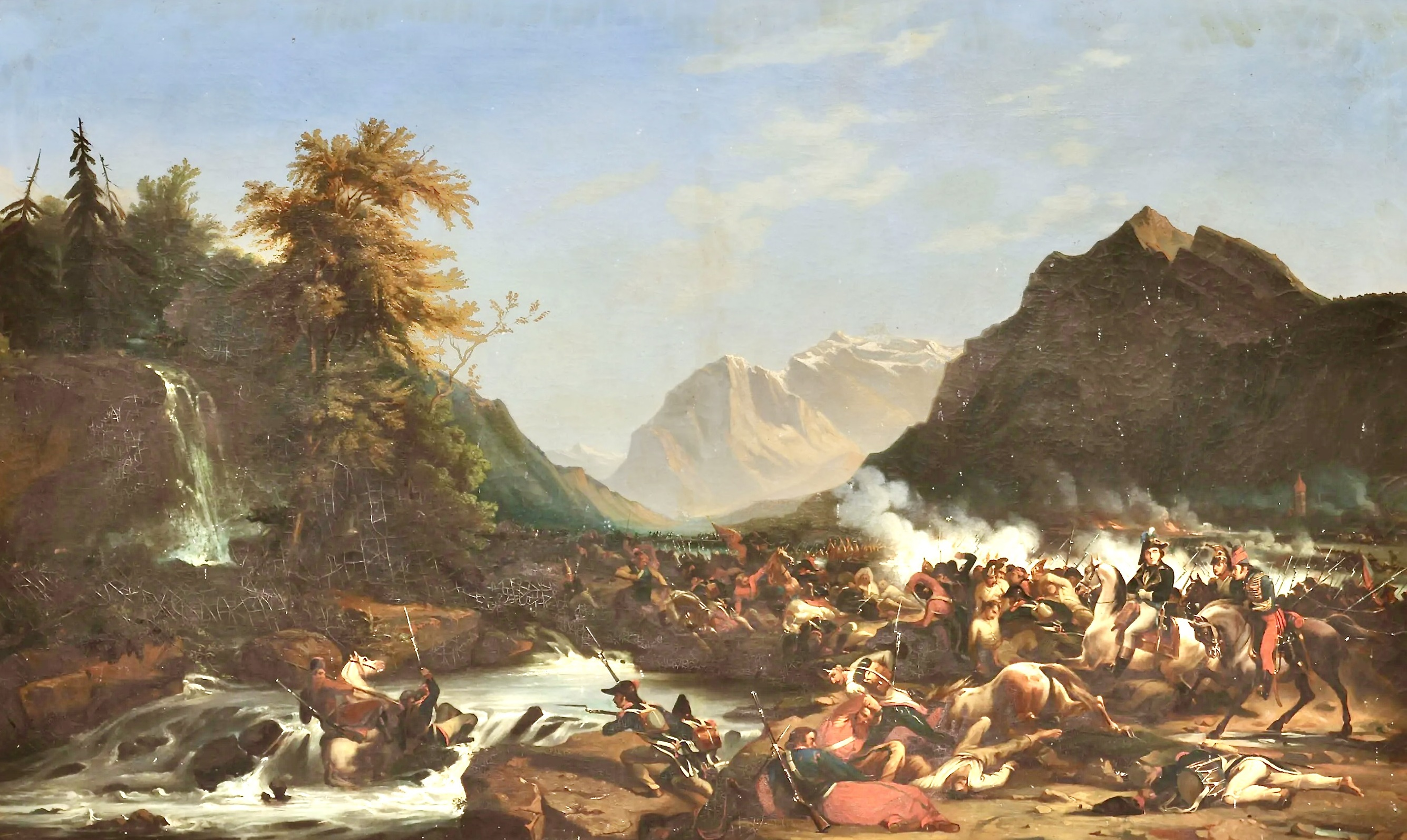
- Painting of the battle
Date	1 October 1799
Location	Glarus, Switzerland
Result	See Result

Belligerents
Russian Empire; Habsburg monarchy	France; Helvetic Republic

Commanders and leaders
(Russian Empire) Alexander Suvorov (Note: Quite possible that he slept through this career day, — his poor health may have influenced this. Some sources do not mention him as a participant in the battle. One way or another, the Russian offensive was carried out according to his disposition, which, besides other things, was implying a move to Glarus and then to Sargans and, as circumstances dictate, further, to join up with Alexander Korsakov and Friedrich von Hotze.) (Russian Empire) Pyotr Bagration (Note: He carried out tactical control, acting according to the disposition of troops.) (Russian Empire) Yakov Povalo-Shveikovsky (Russian Empire) Wilhelm Derfelden (Habsburg monarchy) Franz Xaver von Auffenberg	(French First Republic) Jean-de-Dieu Soult (French First Republic) Gabriel Molitor (French First Republic) Honoré Gazan

Strength
approx. 6,000–7,000; (Note: approx. 8,000 on both sides, considering the Battle of Klöntal.) far less involved [?] (Note: Reding-Biberegg, p. 127, claims that by the day's end the French forces vastly outnumbered the Russians. It is known that assistance was received from Shveikovsky's division; as Suvorov reported to Paul I, only its advance detachment was involved.)	approx. 6,000–7,000 (Note: 3,150 – 3,200 without taking into account Gazan's troops. Christopher Duffy notices both commanders. Dmitry Milyutin notices approx. 8,000 men, including reinforcements and considering the Battle of Klöntal.); • 3,150–3,200 under Molitor; • The rest of the troops under Gazan

Casualties and losses
Battle: unknown Operation: 2,400–2,450 400–450 dead 1,700 injured 300 captured	Battle: unknown Operation: comparable to the enemy's [?] 317–1,000 dead 820–830 injured at least 300–365 captured; possibly ≥1,000 captured

The Battle of Glarus (also variously known as the Combat of Näfels and the Combat of Netstal) (Note: The name of the municipality of Netstal is sometimes found as Netstall.) was a meeting engagement fought on 1 October 1799. (Note: French Revolutionary Calendar: 9th Vendémiaire Year 8; Russian (Julian) Calendar: September 20, 1799.) The battle ended the Austro-Russian invasion of the Helvetic Republic, which was the last campaign that involved the Russian commander Alexander Suvorov. The French (Gabriel Molitor's brigade and Honoré Gazan's division) were led by Jean-de-Dieu Soult.

Initially, Suvorov's rearguard, led by Andrei Rosenberg, was able to fend off a French attack led by André Masséna in the Battle of the Muota Valley. Suvorov's vanguard under Pyotr Bagration managed to overwhelm French forces in the Battle of Klön Valley, and then at Glarus by capturing Netstal, but came to a stalemate near Näfels and Mollis, whereupon Suvorov ordered Bagration to disengage. The battle of Glarus includes the combat of Netstal, which was won by the Allies, and the combat of Näfels where they suffered a defeat. The last combat also includes the engagement at Mollis. Suvorov completed the main operational task by taking Glarus, which deprived the French of hope for decisive success. Suvorov began a retreat from Switzerland to seek for Alexander Korsakov and the Austrians as he had planned before. Suvorov was forced to abandon Switzerland both because of Masséna's domination in the TO (which was achieved thanks to the Second Battle of Zurich and the Battle of the Linth River) and because of the lack of supplies and ammunition. The capture of Glarus ensured safe passage out of the country, namely up the Sernftal via Engi, Elm and the Panix Pass to Ilanz and beyond. In his report to Emperor Paul I Suvorov did not mention the setback at Näfels. Instead, the report portrayed his Alpine campaign as a series of his victories.

== Background ==
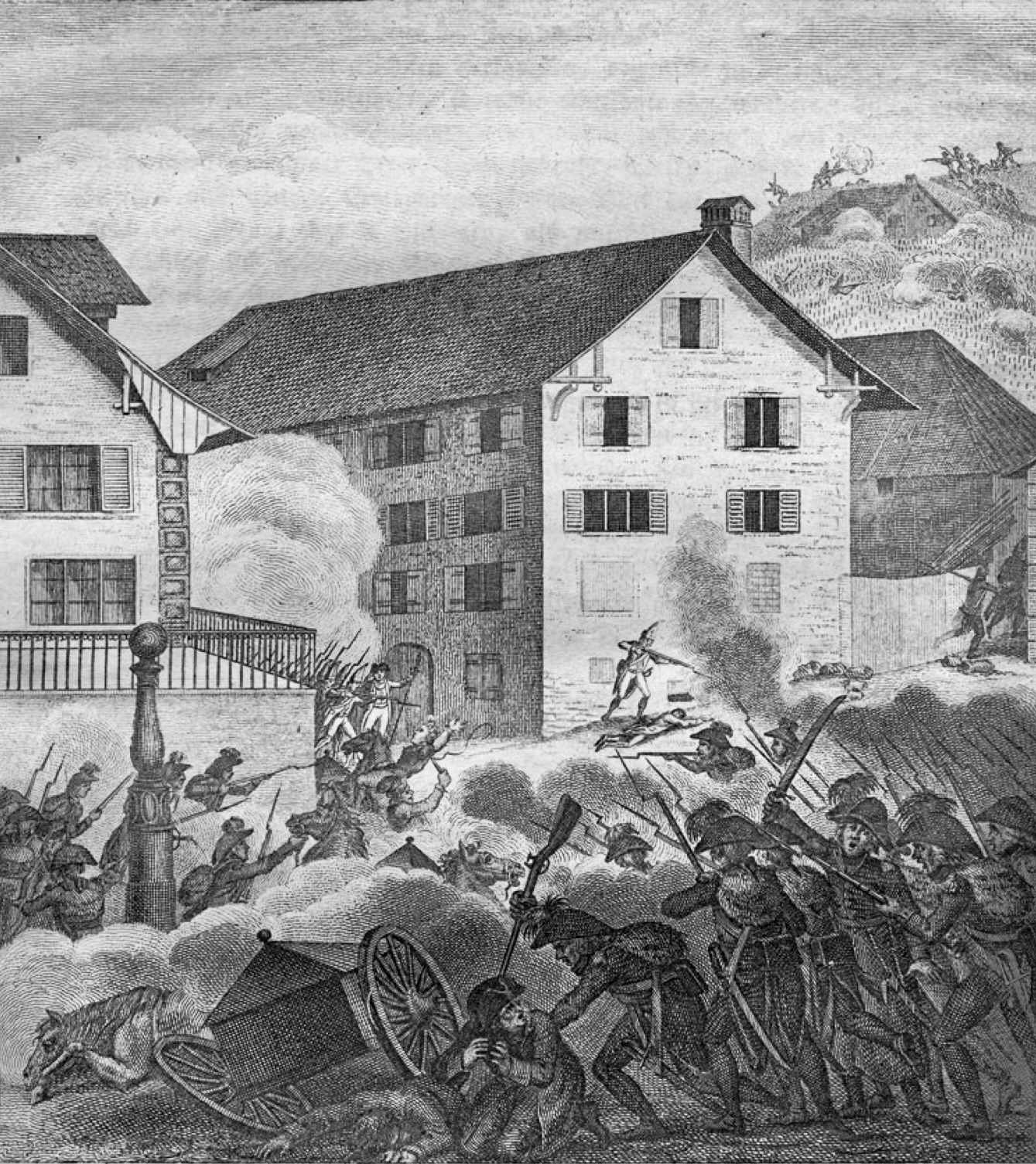
Fighting in Zurich, September 26, 1799

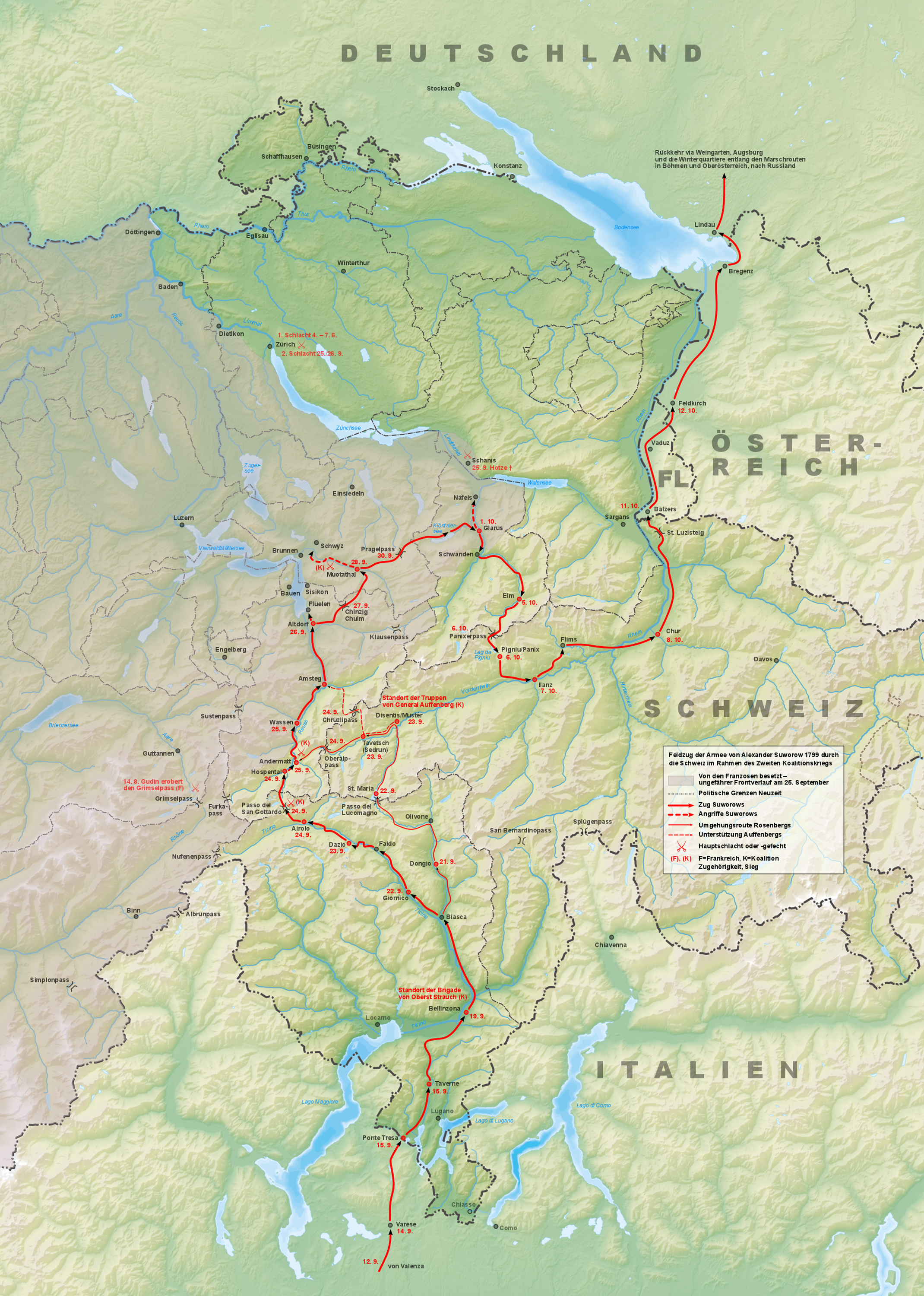
Suvorov's campaign in Switzerland

The Helvetic Revolution of 1798 led to a radical change in the Swiss constitution and to the military occupation of the country by France. According to the Glarus pastor Markus Freuler, this was because the old constitution "was no longer arbitrary to a large part of Switzerland and was no longer appropriate to the spirit of the people," and because only an external power was able to "carry out this important work". At that time, the Canton of Glarus, where Anna Göldi was executed as a witch in 1782, renounced its rights to rule in numerous bailiwicks, but stuck to its old constitution. When its militia troops were defeated at Wollerau, it only escaped military occupation by accepting the new constitution. The city of Glarus became the capital of the Greater Canton of Linth, under Freuler and the "wise direction" of Government Representative^{[de]} Joachim Heer. But despite the promises made, after the Austrians' advance to Graubünden, French troops were stationed there. In April 1799, the confiscation of Glarus' artillery led to an uprising. When the Austrians replaced the French as the occupying power in May, the canton of Glarus returned to the Ancien Régime for a short time, with the instigator of the judicial murder of Anna Göldi receiving government honors. In August the French invaded again.

During the Egyptian Expedition of Napoleon Bonaparte, Great Britain expanded its struggle against the revolutionary France through alliances with Austria, Russia and others monarchical states, leading to the War of the Second Coalition. In 1799, the 68-year-old Field Marshal Alexander Suvorov, as head of the Austro-Russian army in Italy, won a series of battles against troops from France and its subsidiary republics. As the "always willful and irritable old man" became a burden for the coalition, he was supposed to join (at the suggestion of the British foreign minister Lord Grenville) with his compatriot Lieutenant General Alexander Korsakov and the Austrian Field Marshal Lieutenant Friedrich Hotze at Zurich and invade France with them. Previously, Feldzeugmeister Archduke Charles of Austria had led the Austrian troops in the Helvetic Republic against Divisional General André Masséna, and threw him back to the Linth-Limmat line during the First Battle of Zurich, but was then replaced by Korsakov.

Contrary to popular thesis, the Austrians had no influence on Suvorov choosing the route over the Gotthard to cross the Alps, which could be blocked at Lake Uri; on the other hand, Suvorov ended up in Switzerland not of his own free will, since after the Battle of Novi he intended to go to Liguria to complete his victory. On the pass, the French offered him strong resistance, but in the Schöllenen, contrary to legend, he met only weak resistance. In total, 9,000 men under Divisional General Claude Lecourbe are said to have inflicted losses on the 21,000 Russians and Austrians at a ratio of 1 to 3 (2,000 men to 6,000). At the time of the Second Battle of Zurich and the Battle of Linth River (September 25–26), Suvorov had only reached Wassen. To break the deadlock near Altdorf, he attempted to reach Schwyz via the Kinzig Pass, but he learned in the Muotatal about Korsakov's defeat against Masséna in the Second Battle of Zurich and Hotze's defeat against Divisional General Jean-de-Dieu Soult at Schänis (Linth) on 25 or 26 September. Masséna's troops prevented him from marching north, and Lecourbe prevented him from retreating south. The route over the Pragelpass and the Klöntal into the Linth Valley offered a way out. The 29-year-old Gabriel Molitor, who had recently been appointed Brigade General, had driven two Austrian military leaders out of the role since 25 September: Major General Franjo Jelačić towards Sargans and Field Marshal Lieutenant Friedrich Linken in the direction of Surselva. After receiving reinforcements from Masséna and Soult, on 30 September, Molitor held the Austrian brigade of Major General Franz Xaver von Auffenberg in the Klöntal. Auffenberg's brigade was followed by the vanguard of Major General Bagration, who helped drive the French out of the Klöntal.

The existing reports describe the Battle of Näfels/Glarus/Netstal from different perspectives. Some Russian sources heroize the defeat of Suvorov and blame it on the Austrians. In Switzerland, supporters of the Ancien Régime viewed the field marshal as a liberator, while supporters of the Helvetic Republic viewed him as "Attila of our century," as Heinrich Zschokke called him.

== Summary ==
=== According to locals ===
Under the eyes of the Austro-Russian troops, the journal Glarner-Zeitung wrote on 3 October:

1 October was a terrible day, the Imperial Austrians received help from the Russian peoples, under the command of the famous hero of Italy, Suvorov, across the Gotthard. United, they attacked the Franks (French) at the beginning of Lake Klöntal, and defeated them not only there, but also in all places, behind and near Riederen, Durschen, Nettstall, etc. The whole day from morning to evening one heard nothing other than cannoning and shooting, the French retreated as far as Näfels and Mollis, as well as over the Ennetberg and Frohnalp of the high mountains of Schilt.

The newspaper described the field marshal as follows:

Suvorov, a Russian senior general, small in stature, old, with ice-gray hair, common ordinary in conversation and dress like a soldier, but big in spirit, big in heroic deeds. This year he is showing the greatness of his military spirit in Italy, and it will soon develop in Switzerland [!]. The K. K. and Russian troops have their positions near Riederen, Nettstall and Glarus; the French, on the other hand, at Näfels and Mollis.

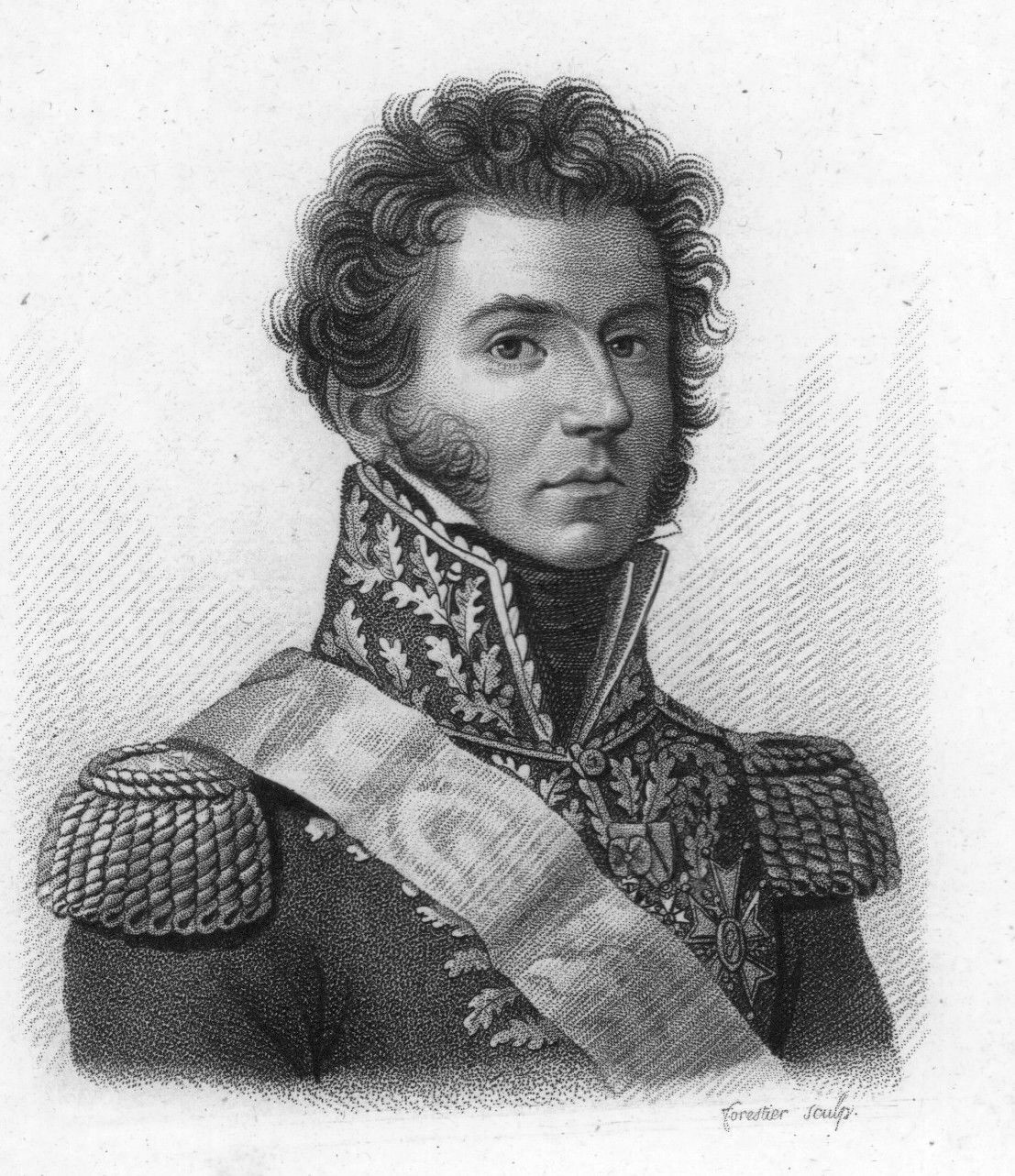
Gabriel Jean Joseph Molitor

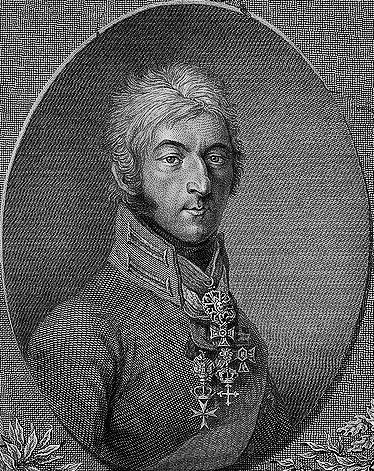
Pyotr Bagration

The Neue Helvetische Tagblatt summarized this report and added:

On this morning of October 1 the French finally had to give way, the Russians and the Imperials moved in here [in Glarus] at 9 o'clock in the morning; but the French gave them every foothold, and since the Russians had no more ammunition, but only had to operate with the bayonet and did not carry any cannon with them, at the same time the French had 8 of them, so they lost a lot of people.

After freedom of the press was restored, Freuler published a chronicle of the guerilla war that old-minded locals had waged against the French. Ninety named Glarus residents were killed and fifty-six wounded, most of them near Wollerau in 1798. The priest also mentioned a single incident involving women and children, in which a stray cannonball killed and wounded two people in Ennetbühls. Freuler only reported briefly on the much more important battle of Näfels:

The Russians and 1,800 Austrian troops attacked the French on the lake, and chased them to Riederen, where the French resisted and wanted to stop the enemy's further advance, but the Russians attacked them one after the other with their bayonets fixed, and the French had to retreat from there as well. When they gave way, the Russians stormed across the Durschen to Netstal, across the lower bridge, which the French set on fire to cover their retreat; but regardless of this, the Russians crossed the Linth River and pursued the enemy all day long on both sides of the river to Näfels and Mollis with alternating success. Four times they had to give way to Netstal due to the fierce resistance of the French, but each time they stormed them, forcing them to retreat to Näfels, Oberurnen and Mollis, so that the Russians maintained the battlefield. Their advance also threatened to cut off about 1,000 French people in the Sernftal and upper Linth Valley, who then fled over Glarus, the Ennetbühlser Brücke and the Ennetberge, throwing their ammunition wagons into the water.

An unknown person wrote to his nephew in Jura:

On September 30 we learned that Suvorov was with a strong column of the Russian Italian Army coming through the Klöntal mountain gorge. [...] We believed that the French would defend these narrow and almost inaccessible gorges well, but we were wrong. On the morning of 1 October, we heard shooting and soon we saw them retreating behind Riedern towards Netstal. The French burned the bridge at Riedern, which protected the city of Glarus a little. The fight took place on the other side of the Löntsch. I went to Galgenbühl [Sun Hill] with my brother. All the other fights were just child's play compared to this one. The Russians ran into the fire without knowing the danger. This time the French had guns and the Russians had almost none. They pursued the French all the way to Näfels. This village was conquered and recaptured twice. To cover their retreat, the French also burned down the beautiful covered bridge at Netstal, but they were able to hold on in Näfels. The Russians, however, had over 2,500 wounded.

The Helvetic Directorate was informed about the Battle of Näfels/Glarus from the neighboring district capital Schänis. Johannes Theiler from Zurich, the government commissioner for the canton of Linth, reported on 2 October that the previous day "after a stubborn encounter near Lake Klönthal, in which the enemy lost 2,000 men, the French were nevertheless repelled as far as Ober-Urnen, with losses of c. 800 men injured and dead". Late in the evening, however, after the French had received a demi-brigade of reinforcements, the enemy was repulsed again "beyond Netstall." The French are "not only in possession of the Kerenzerberg to Walenstadt," but have also "gained a firm foothold throughout the entire Sarganserland up on this side of the Rhine." Now the troops are "inactive because of the bad weather". Also from Schänis, cantonal judge Xaver Gmür reported on 4 October to Rapperswiler Christoph Fuchs, who had previously been the acting government representative of the canton of Linth, Without the brave stance of the 2nd Swiss Half Brigade, the French would have had to retreat and, probably, Weesen could have been lost too. According to Gmür, the ratio of Russian losses to French losses was eight to one.

Master cordwainer (shoemaker) Levi Feldtmann from Schwanden wrote a poem in Knittelversen with the title Der Einzug der russischen Armee in unser Land, 'The Entry of the Russian Army into our Country'. The manufacturer Johann Heinrich Blumer, who fled to Zurich, owned the Haus in der Wiese (Wiesli 5) in Glarus, where Suvorov spent the last night before his retreat and Molitor also took up residence several times. Blumer learned from his manager Paulus Wichser that the Russian attack was a matter of winning or dying "because of great hunger," but that the French had advantageous positions. According to the family chronicle of master carpenter Balthasar Joseph Tschudi from Ennenda, who visited the Russian camp in Netstal, there were wounded people lying there "almost in all the cellars and lairs".

Overall, the reports gave the impression that the locals who remained in the valley watched the battle as powerless spectators. The weather was wet enough that not many houses burned down, but not wet enough to prevent the French from firing.

=== According to Molitor ===
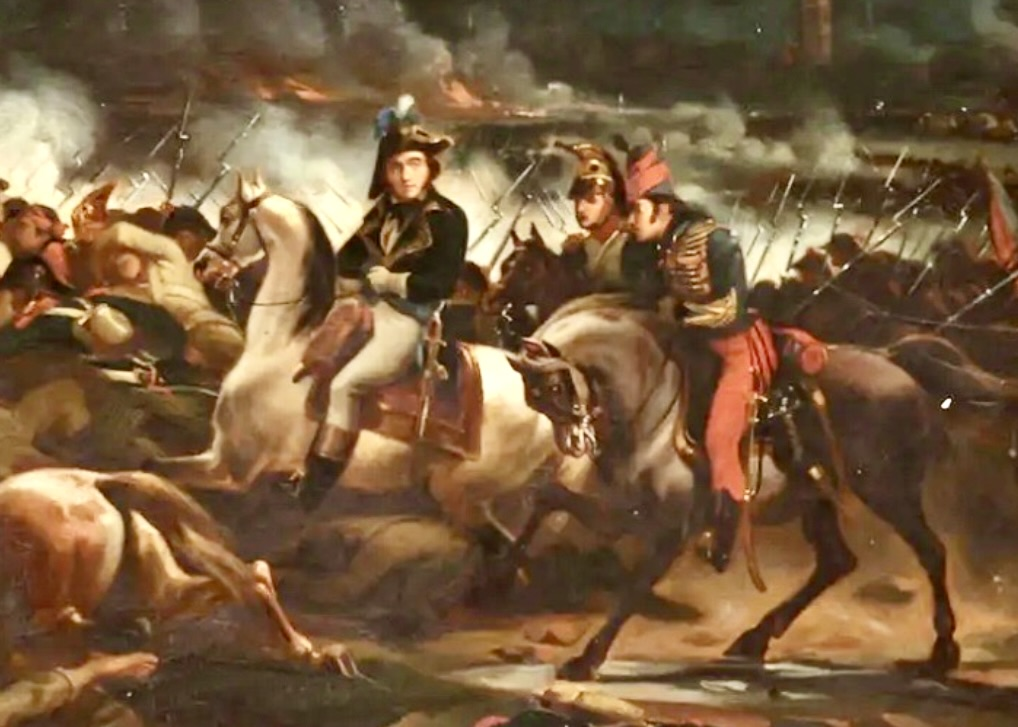
Waiting for reinforcements: Molitor with Dragoon and Hussar

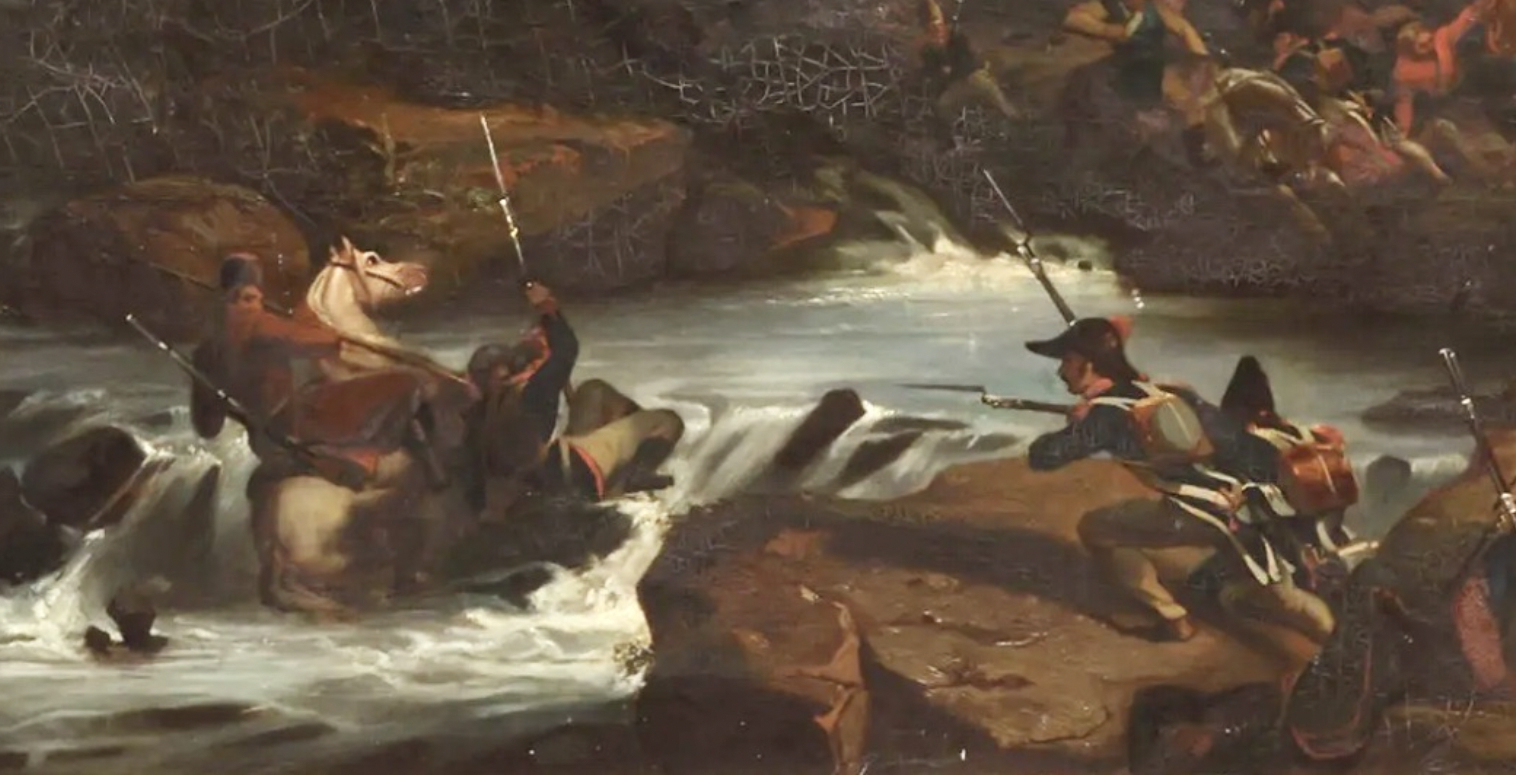
French Grenadier in the Linth

Immediately following the battle the most detailed report on it was written by Molitor, although he had not slept from September 25 to 29. According to his information, he still controlled the eastern end of the Klöntalersee on the morning of 1 October. While he had recalled most of the troops that were supposed to follow Jelačić and Linken, he only had three battalions and six companies. He wrote:

the Russians were sending a strong column over the mountains to encircle my right flank and cut off our retreat into the Glarus valley,

He was then forced to retreat to the Linth:

in order to cover the passage of Näfels and thereby prevent the union of Suvorov with Jelačić, across the banks of Walensee, or with Korsakov, who still has to be located on the Thur.

Molitor had left a reserve battalion at the Näfels bridge and half a battalion each in Engi and Kerenzen to observe the retreat of the Linken and Jelačić. He used his remaining units as follows: Some were across the covered bridge of Netstal (built in 1767 by Hans Ulrich Grubenmann). The bridge, which had been prepared for immediate demolition, was defended by one and a half battalions with four guns moved over to the right bank. Two and a half other battalions with three guns lined up in echelon order on the left bank behind Netstal. According to Oberstdivisionär^{[de]} a. D.^{[de]} Fred Heer, Molitor had schanze raised at the bridges of Näfels, Netstal and Glarus before the battle.

Molitor further wrote:

When we arrived at the Linth, the Netstal bridge presented itself as bait to the enemy; he fell there en masse, and immediately the bridge exploded with everything that tried to cross it: this order, carried out in a timely manner, plunged the Russians into great disorder, which was soon increased by the fire of the one and a half battalions and the artillery, which [ ...] from the right bank suppressed the enemy's flank and delayed his deployment. Finally, however, his masses formed up and attacked our troops on the left bank with fury: but these [...] held their ground with fearless cold-bloodedness. The enemy's attacks multiplied; one of his columns was overthrown, but it was followed by several others which, excited by the presence of their General Suvorov, rushed into our bayonets with blind boldness.

Six times the Russians succeeded in throwing the French back to Näfels, and six times the French drove them back to Netstal with bayonets,

always supported by our well-fed fire from the right bank, which the enemy found difficult to respond to.

This cooperation between the units on both sides of the Linth enabled them to hold their ground in the narrow valley where the enemy could not use all of their forces at the same time, just like at the Battle of the Muottental.

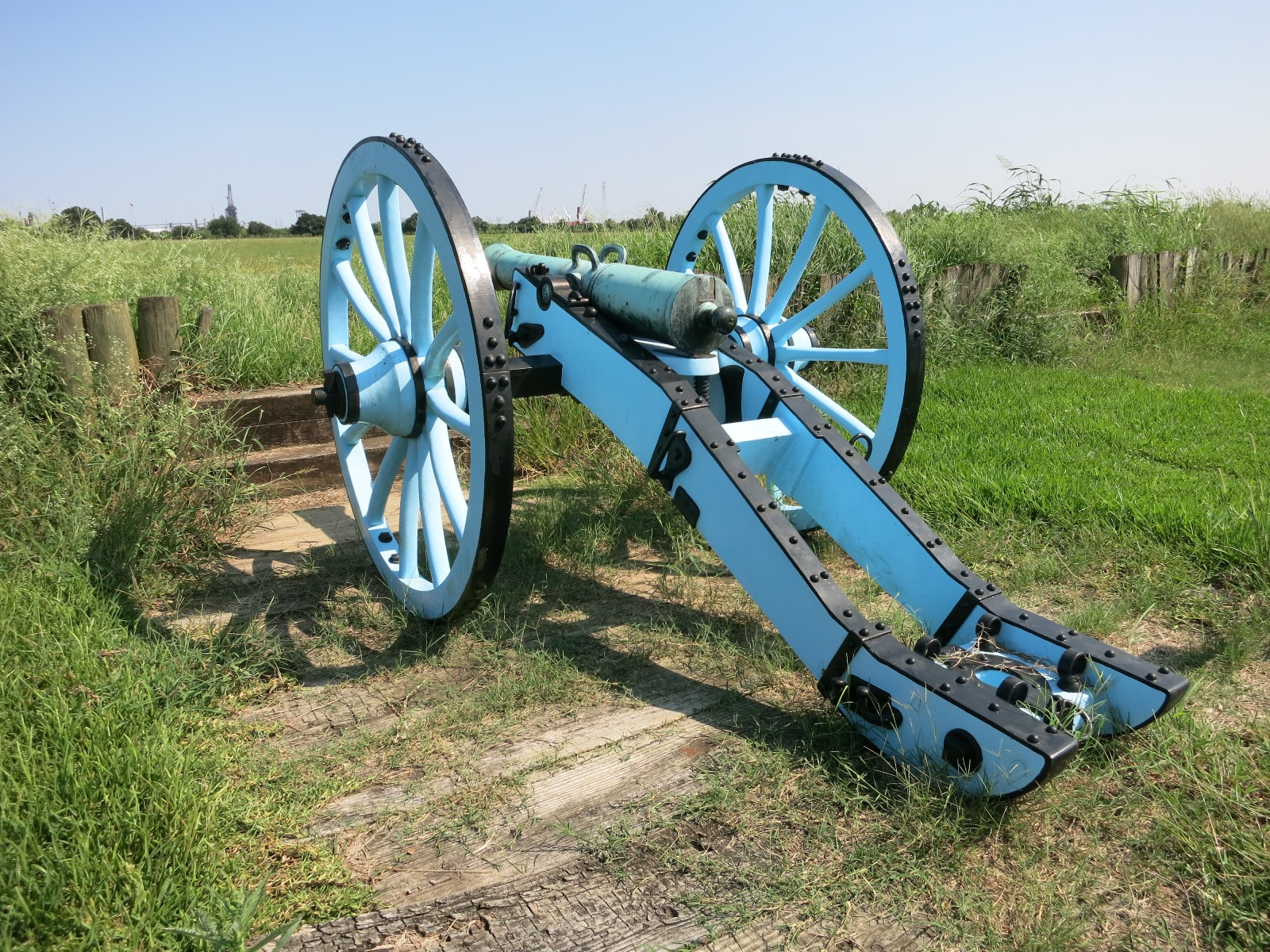
French Canon de 4 Gribeauval in prepared position

The general highlighted five episodes of the battle:

- Leutnant Bélier of Molitor's 84th demi-brigade killed the leader of the attacking column on the railingless Näfels Bridge with his sword during the Russians' third advance.
- Only late, because the French had destroyed the brick bridge near Niederurnen in May, did first aid arrive from Gazan: at the head of 40 chasseur à cheval of the 10th Regiment, Molitor's adjutant Jean-Daniel Fridolsheim saved the French gunners from being overwhelmed.
- While none of the British-paid units from the Canton of Linth participated in the battle, Swiss distinguished themselves on the side of the French, as in the previous battles against the Austrians and Russians: When the bridge at Näfels had already been lost, 300 men of the 2nd Helvetic Half Brigade arrived from Weesen. They were commanded by Adjutant-Major Karl Zingg of Aarburg, who had fallen in 1812 as the commander of a Swiss regiment at the Berezina, and (after his severe wounding) by battalion commander Beat Felber of Lucerne. Reminded by Molitor of the Battle of Näfels in 1388, they recaptured the bridge. According to Molitor, a Russian battalion that had crossed the Linth on a trestle bridge and occupied Mollis was subsequently thrown back.
- A grenadier battalion, headed by Gazan himself, was deployed by Molitor as a reserve in a final attack, which was carried forward by three columns with bayonets and supported by two four-pounders with grapeshot.
- The last Russian counterattack at Netstal was repelled by Colonel Pierre-Charles Lochet, who appeared on the battlefield at nine o'clock in the evening with 400 men of his 94th demi-brigade.

While the fighting was resting on October 2 and 3, Molitor received information from Glarus, occupied by the enemy. He noted:

The inhabitants remained loyal to us, and we reaped the fruits of the good discipline of our troops.

For this good discipline Molitor had received the thanks of the Helvetic Directory, while complaining about excesses of some soldiers of Soult's division. As per the Le Moniteur Universel, the locals remained calm this time, one had not seen any of them under arms, several had even served the French as guides in the mountains. Netstal had atoned for his Helvetic attitude by being completely plundered by the Russians.

=== According to Suvorov ===
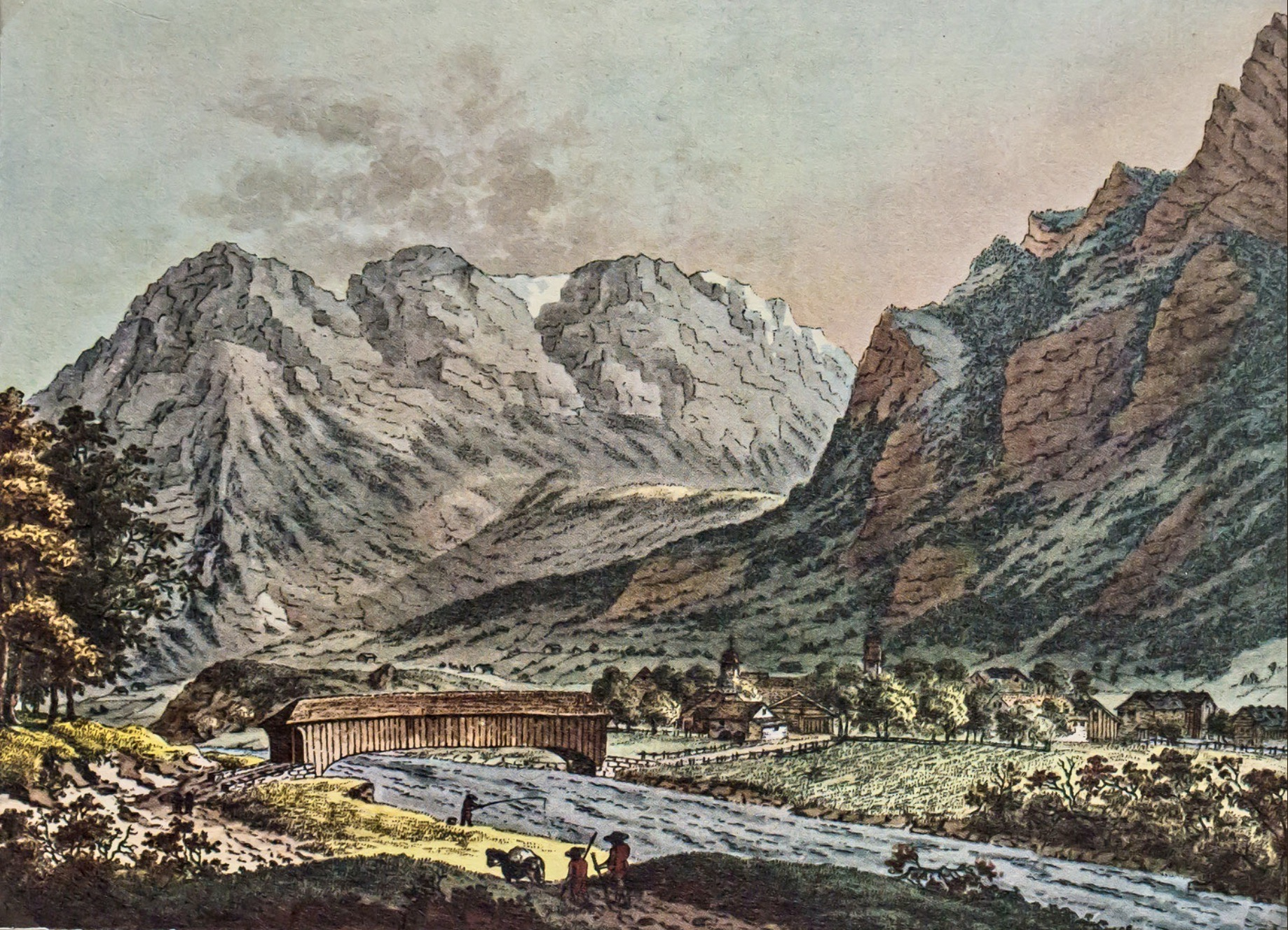
Covered wooden bridge at Netstal before destruction

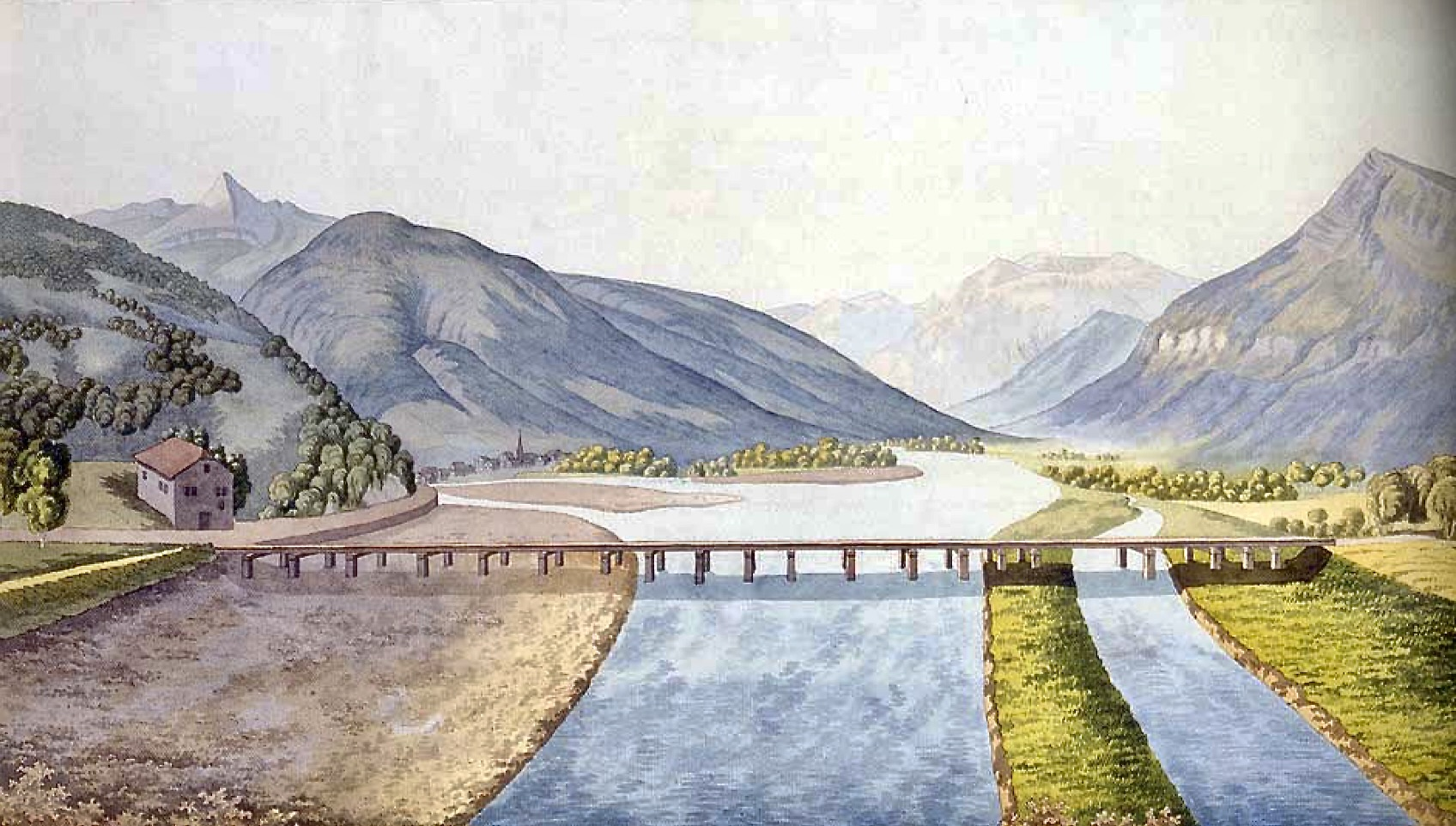
Railless wooden bridge between Näfels and Mollis

We do not know what role Suvorov personally played in the battle. The man used to have lunch at 8 or 9 o'clock in the morning and sleep during the day. He never left his quarters, except on the day of a battle, where he either stayed in the same place all the time or plunged into the hottest fight like a madman. Quite possible that the eccentric general slept through this blackest day of his career; however, that he spent the blackest day under a chestnut at Riedern can only be found in the semidocumentary work of Édouard Gachot.

Probably on 2 October he wrote a pessimistic picture of his situation, in which it is said that the Austrians can no longer be counted on:

We now only have the duty to unite with Korsakov and, if possible, to save him. He is [...] in Schaffhausen and may have fallen even further back. His equipment and ammunition were lost. Our ammunition supply is exhausted—we have almost no artillery at all. We have neither food nor wagons. The resistance, or rather the pursuit of the enemy, continues.

Accordingly, the paper even talks about retreating from Chur or immediately to Italy. On 7 October, Suvorov reported to Archduke Charles from Panix that he had learned of Korsakov's defeat in the Muota Valley (Muotatal). Molitor occupied the narrows on the Klöntalersee:

[...] however, we drove the enemy out of the indicated defiles and pushed him to Mollis and Näffels, where we were on 1 October.

Meanwhile, General of the Infantry Andrei Rosenberg pushed the French out of the Muotatal.

In these stubborn battles, however, we used up all our ammunition and were therefore forced to avoid new battles. This even caused me to give up the union with General Jelačić via Mollis and Wallenstadt, since this could only be carried out through new battles [...]

Suvorov apparently had to advance towards Lake Zurich, contrary to what Brigadier General François Louis Dedon-Duclos believed was no longer even considered. In identical letters on 9 October, Suvorov reported to the kings of Naples and Sardinia that the French attacked Rosenberg,

at the same time he [meaning: Suvorov himself] under General Derfelden's command, defeated General Molitor near Glaris. [...] In this way I opened the direct route to Zurich, where I suspected Korsakov's corps; but since I learned that it had been forced to change its position by superior enemy forces, I directed myself to Graubünden [...].

The letter concludes with the words:

In this way I have now come very close to my main goal and have gained the opportunity: to operate with united forces against the enemy, so I hope to soon inform Your Majesty about the full implementation of the plan prescribed to me.

The letters show how Suvorov felt about the truth. To the Archduke he described Korsakov's defeat as a mere change of position. In his letter to the kings, he pushed back the date, on which news of the battle at Zurich arrived, by three days. But above all he made the failed advance to Näfels and the occupation of Glarus without a fight as victories, in which later authors followed him.

In the description of 1 October, which is a report from Suvorov to Paul I (14 October), the crucial hours of the battle are missing. It only says:

[...] early in the morning the enemy was disturbed by rifle fire from the patrols sent forward, and immediately retaliated with a powerful rifle volley. Thereupon the vanguard, after uniting with the first detachment of General Yakov Povalo-Shveikovsky's troops, advanced again to the battle. Despite his resistance and although he made good use of the impassable terrain and the reinforcements, the enemy was pushed back [...] The battle lasted until 10 o'clock in the evening when Major General Prince Bagration dropped outposts as night fell and set up the camp.

The fact that Suvorov only described the beginning and the end of the day supports the assumption that he spent it in bed. However, he seems to have recognized the danger of the enemy. The day of the battle coincided with Paul I's 45th birthday together. In another version of the report, Suvorov wrote that on

the solemn day of the most joyful birth of Your Imperial Majesty [...] Massena was defeated, and on the other side, the enemy suffered a continuous defeat for almost 24 hours at Lake Seruta (Seerüti) [!]

This demonstrates the devotion and loyalty of the subjects to their most gracious sovereigns.

=== According to Archduke Charles ===
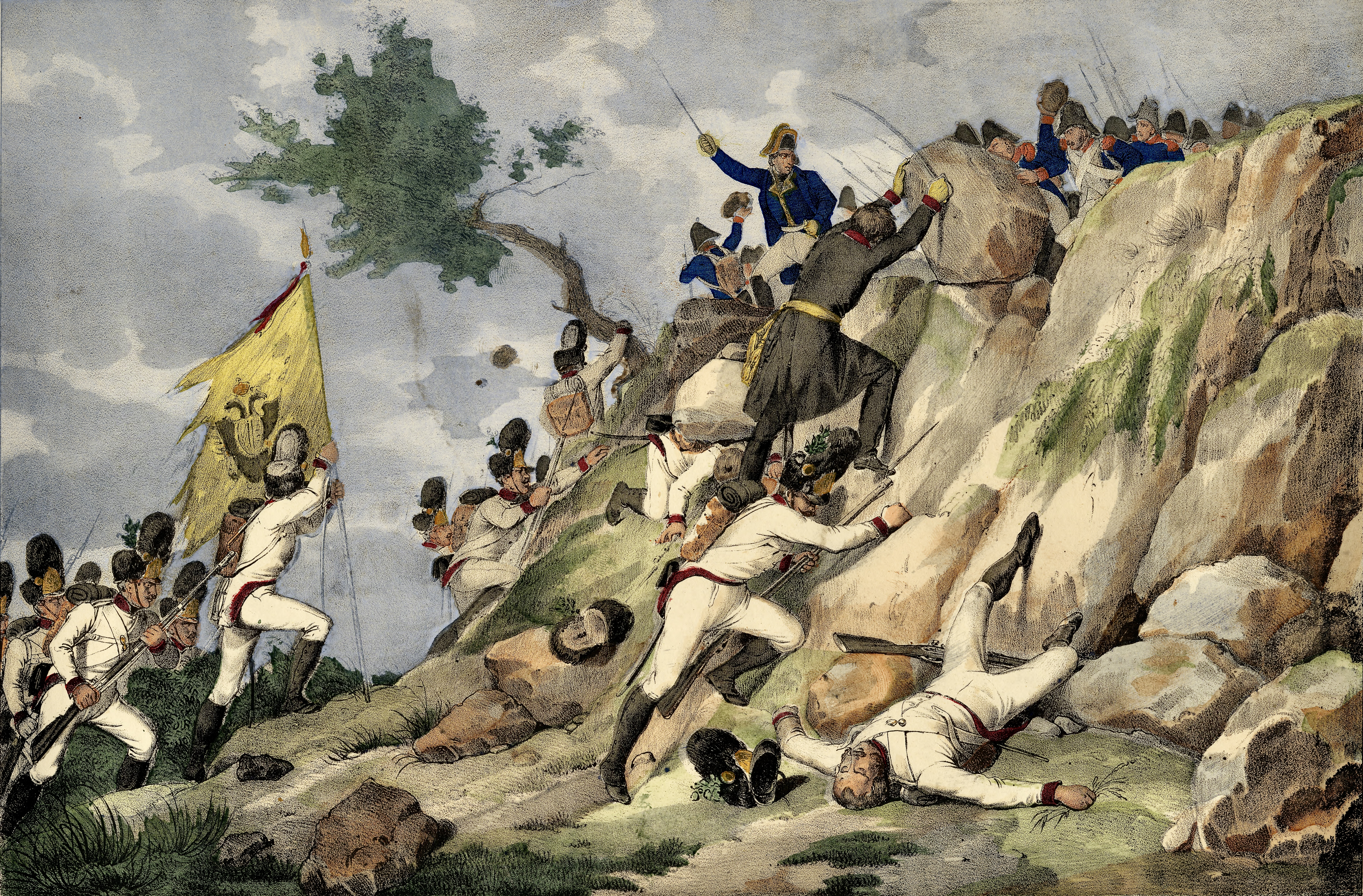
The French repel the Austrian attack up the hill at Klöntalersee

Archduke Charles, Duke of Teschen, wrote in his Geschichte des Feldzugs von 1799 in Deutschland und in der Schweiz, 'History of the 1799 Campaign in Germany and Switzerland':

Side columns climbed the mountains during the night and appeared in the rear of the French on 1 October. Molitor had to give way: but, attacked with disorder by the Austrians and Russians, he did not lose his composure; stood up again and turned away the boldest of those pursuing him. Then he crossed the Linth at Nets-Thal; set the bridge on fire; defended it until it collapsed, and finally took positions near Näffels and Mollis. The allies wanted to take possession of the latter place and with it the Wesen road. They laboriously built a footbridge over the Linth; put 1 battalion over it, and drove the French out of Mollis: but could not hold on there, as Division General Honoré Gazan brought the rest of his troops from the lower Linth to support Molitor.

=== According to Jomini ===
Under the title 'Beautiful Defense of Molitor in the Klöntal and in Näfels', the Vaudois military theorist Antoine-Henri Jomini, who served the Helvetic Republic, France and most recently as a full general in Russia, wrote:

Suvorov's first division, which had joined Auffenberg's brigade, finished the clearing of the Klöntal and threw the French back on the Linth. Calm in the midst of the danger that beset him, and conscious of the importance and danger of his position, Molitor put up the most skillful resistance, giving up only foot by foot of ground, burning down the bridge at Netstal and retreating behind that at Näfels.

Jomini continued:

Suvorov's advance guard followed the French to Näfels, where Prince Bagration attacked them on 1 October. Perhaps never before had they shown more fortitude and bravery: assured of Gazan's support, Molitor forgot ten days of fatigue, privation and dogged fighting [...] The position was conquered and retaken. The outnumbered Republicans fought bitterly to buy time for Gazan's division to arrive from Schänis; In this battle, the 2nd Helvetic Half Brigade, electrified by the memories that the name Näfels awakened in it, covered itself in glory alongside the French. After Gazan finally left Weesen, he forced the Russians to retreat to Glarus.

=== According to Clausewitz ===
The reports of the Archduke, Jomini and Molitor were summarized by the military scientist, Major General Carl von Clausewitz, who served not only in his homeland Prussia but also in Russia, as follows:

On 1 October the allies attacked General Molitor again and forced him to retreat first behind the Netsthal bridge and then on both sides of the Linth to Näfels and Mollis. But this retreat took place under the most stubborn resistance, and although the Russians continually attacked the French with bayonets and, as Molitor himself says in his report, were often among his people, he still did not lose any of his guns and managed to hold out against Bagration, who pursued him, until the evening, at Nefels and Mollis. Whereupon Gazan rushed in with a pair of battalions to support Molitor and forced Bagration to give up the already conquered villages of Näfels and Mollis.

=== According to Milyutin ===
The best Russian representation of the battle can be found in a work that military historian Dmitry Milyutin wrote in 1852 – История войны России с Францией в царствование Императора Павла I в 1799 году, 'The history of Russia's war with France during the reign of Emperor Paul I in 1799' – on behalf of Emperor Nicholas I and which the author Dr. O. Hartmann (1892) later commented on with some praise and criticism. Hartmann observes that other informants (except Milyutin) are too brief in their presentations. Milyutin's work is an adaptation of Molitor's report, garnished with (alleged) heroic deeds of the head of a musketeer regiment, Major General Nikolai Kamensky.

The later Russian War Minister Milyutin describes the fighting at Lake Klöntal much more dramatically than the French general:

In the heat of the battle, many slipped on the rocks and fell backwards into the depths. The narrow road between the foot of the heights and the shore of the lake was covered with Russian and French corpses.

The diary of Grenadier Captain Nikolai Gryazev [ru], published in 2013, the story of its origins "until today is unclear", only mentions piles of dead Russians. Conversely, only there is talk of a bayonet attack on a withdrawing column, in which the "worthless blood of the French" poured in streams over the valley.

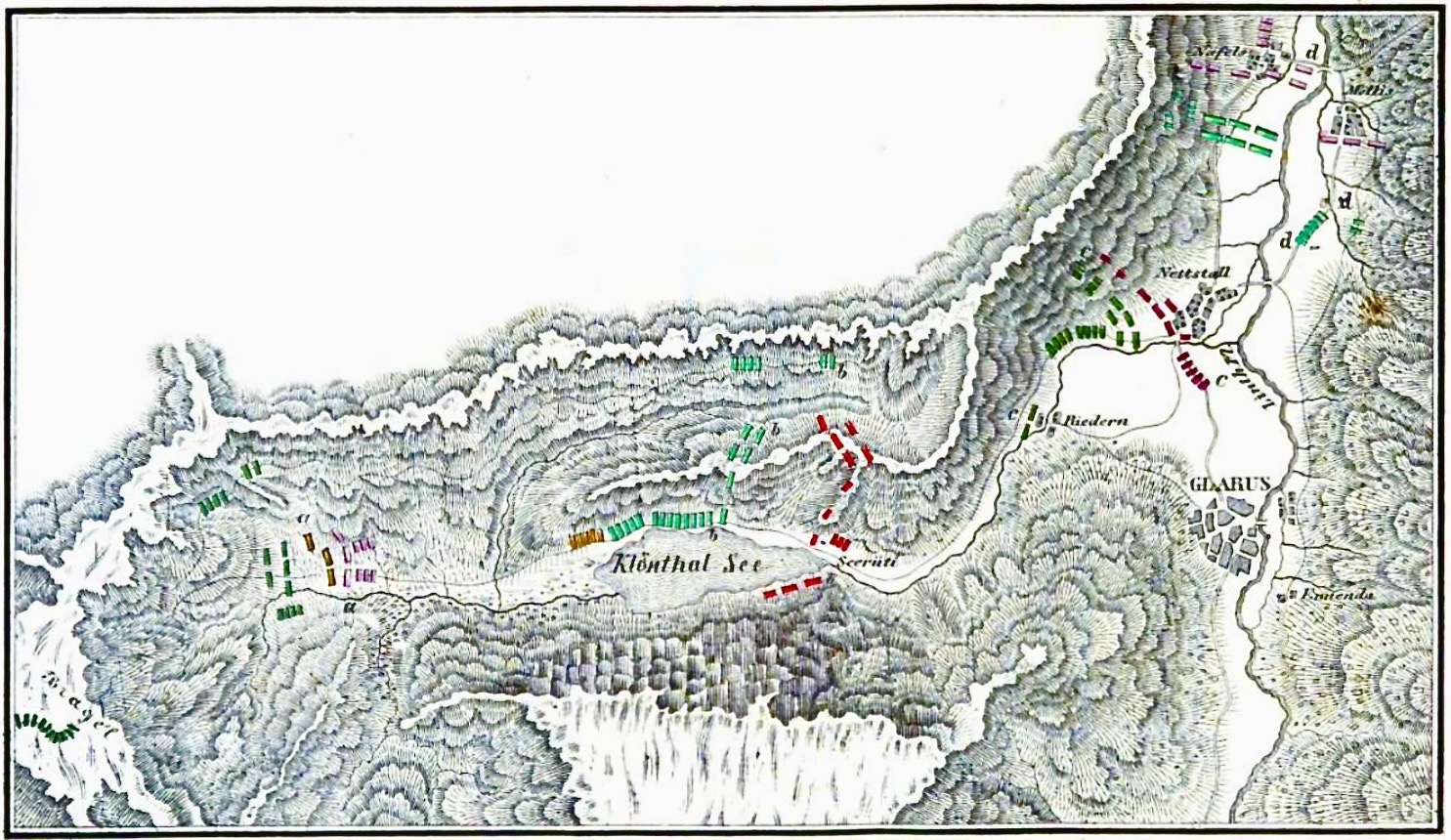
Fights for the Klöntal and near Näfels. By Dmitry Milyutin.

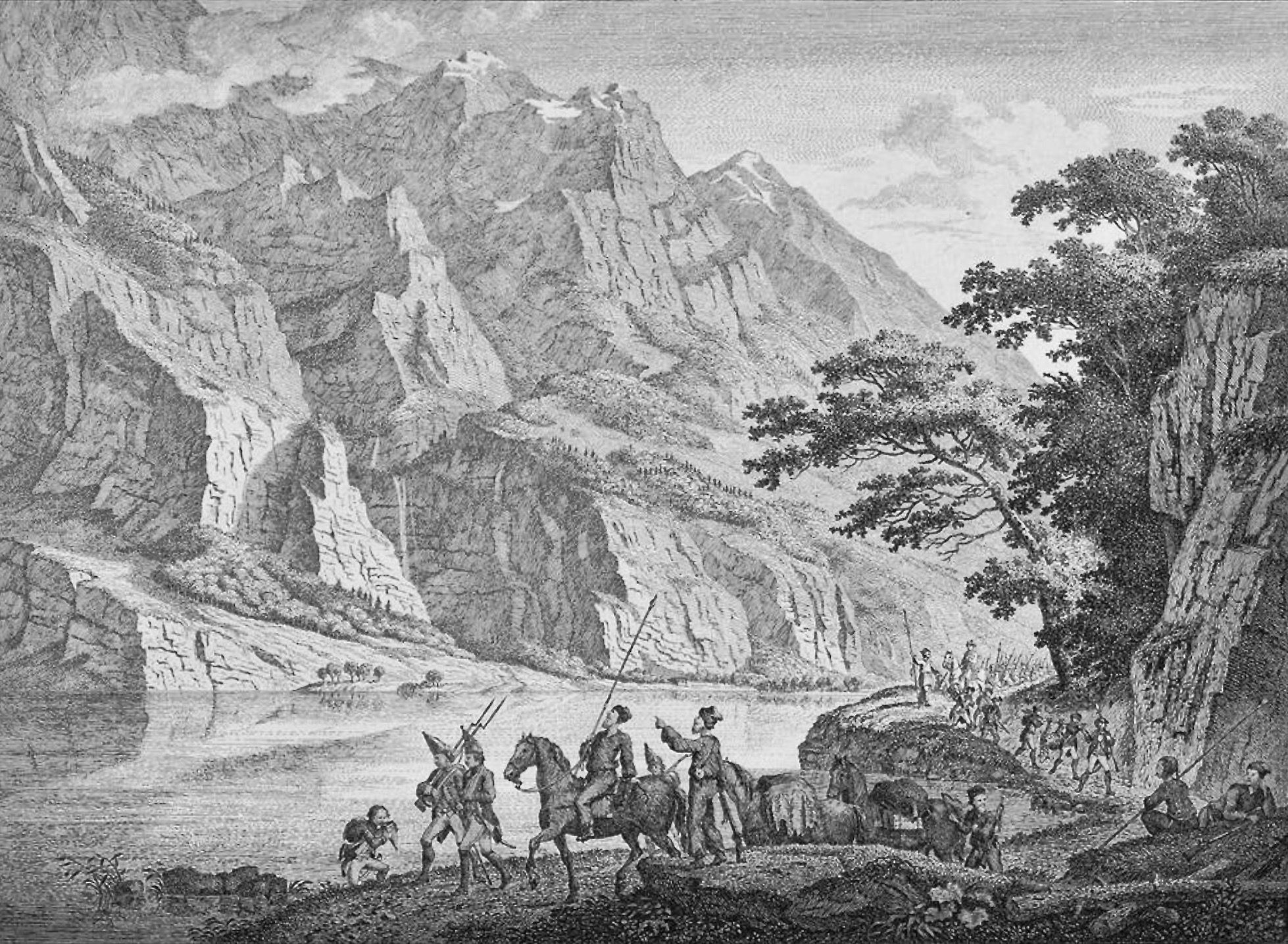
A belittling depiction of Russian grenadiers and Cossacks at Lake Klöntal

The following episode described by Milyutin corresponds to the quoted report of a Swiss eyewitness:

A small French detachment had taken up a position between Glarus and Schwanden to observe Lincken's Austrian column. To secure the retreat of this detachment, Molitor burned the bridge near Riedern and took a position behind the village of Netstall. He stayed here with the greatest persistence until the troops from Glarus united with him.

The Netstal bridge was blown up in both Milyutin and Molitor's authorities. The French then took up an advantageous position south of Näfels, "with the right flank leaning against the mountains and the left leaning against the Linth." A dense Tirailleur chain was spread out "behind fences, in canals and ditches". The cannons fired at the road. Gryazev's diary shows that the enemy used the remnants of the local Letzi as breastwork—probably in accordance with the facts. According to Milyutin, before the construction of the bridge mentioned by Molitor, the Cossacks crossed the Linth by swimming, as French combat swimmers had done when Soult crossed the bridge near Bilten on 25 September. In contrast, in the painting of the battle from Molitor's possession, a Cossack on horseback is trying to reach the other shore. According to Milyutin, the arrival of Gazan's advance guard gave the enemy a numerical advantage. He further wrote:

The French troops, which were on the Linth's right bank, were also reinforced by a Helvetic half-brigade, pushed Kamensky's battalion out of the village of Mollis again, crossed the river on the bridge and attacked the Russian troops, which had occupied Näfels, on the flank.

Milyutin had Molitor's six counterattacks end in Näfels and not in Netstal. In Gryazev's diary, he boasts that he saved the Russians along with Kamensky, "a hero who has hardly appeared in the war so far" (Is the entry in a different handwriting?) – through a nighttime raid.

== Russian retreat ==
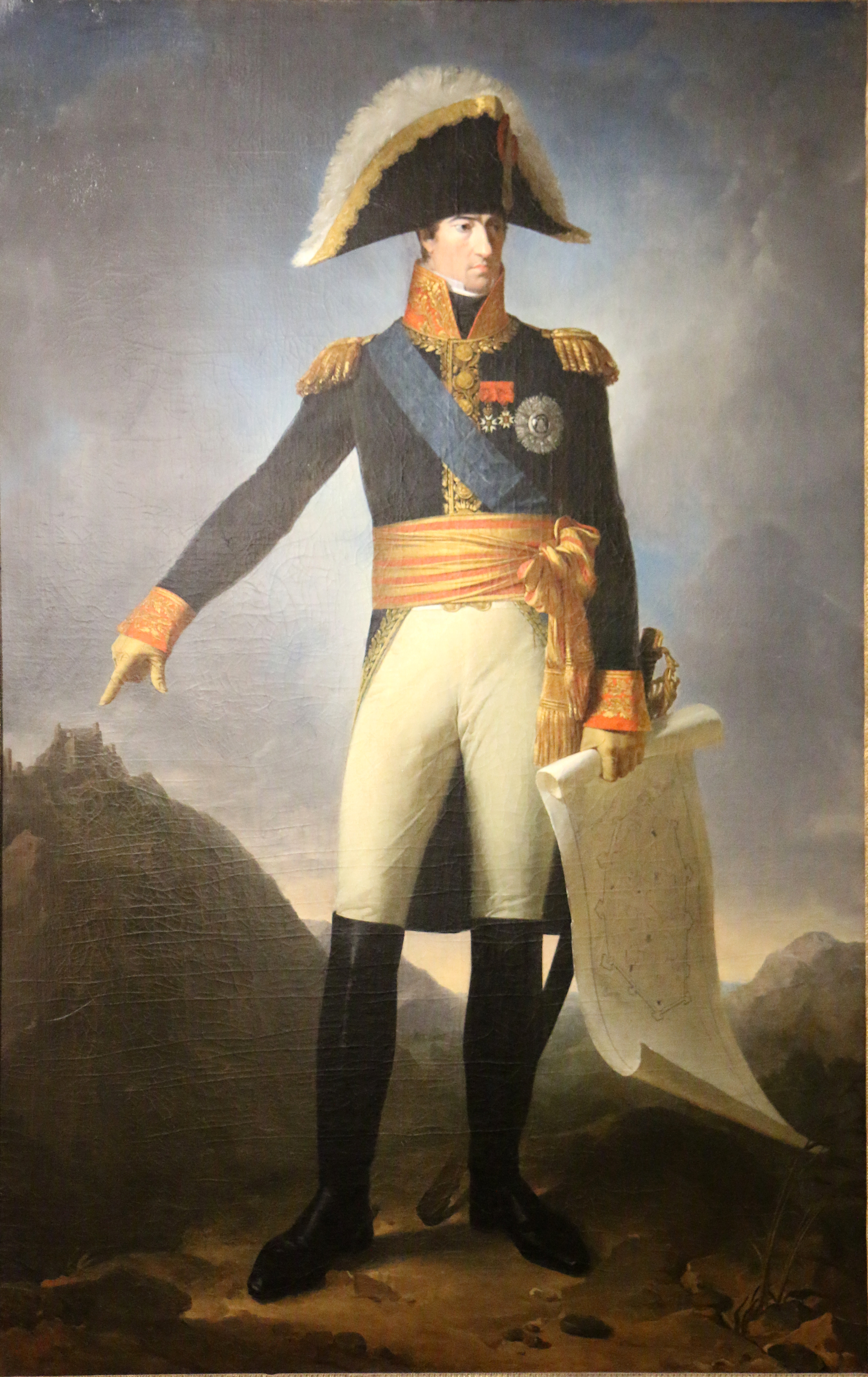
Gazan as Lieutenant General

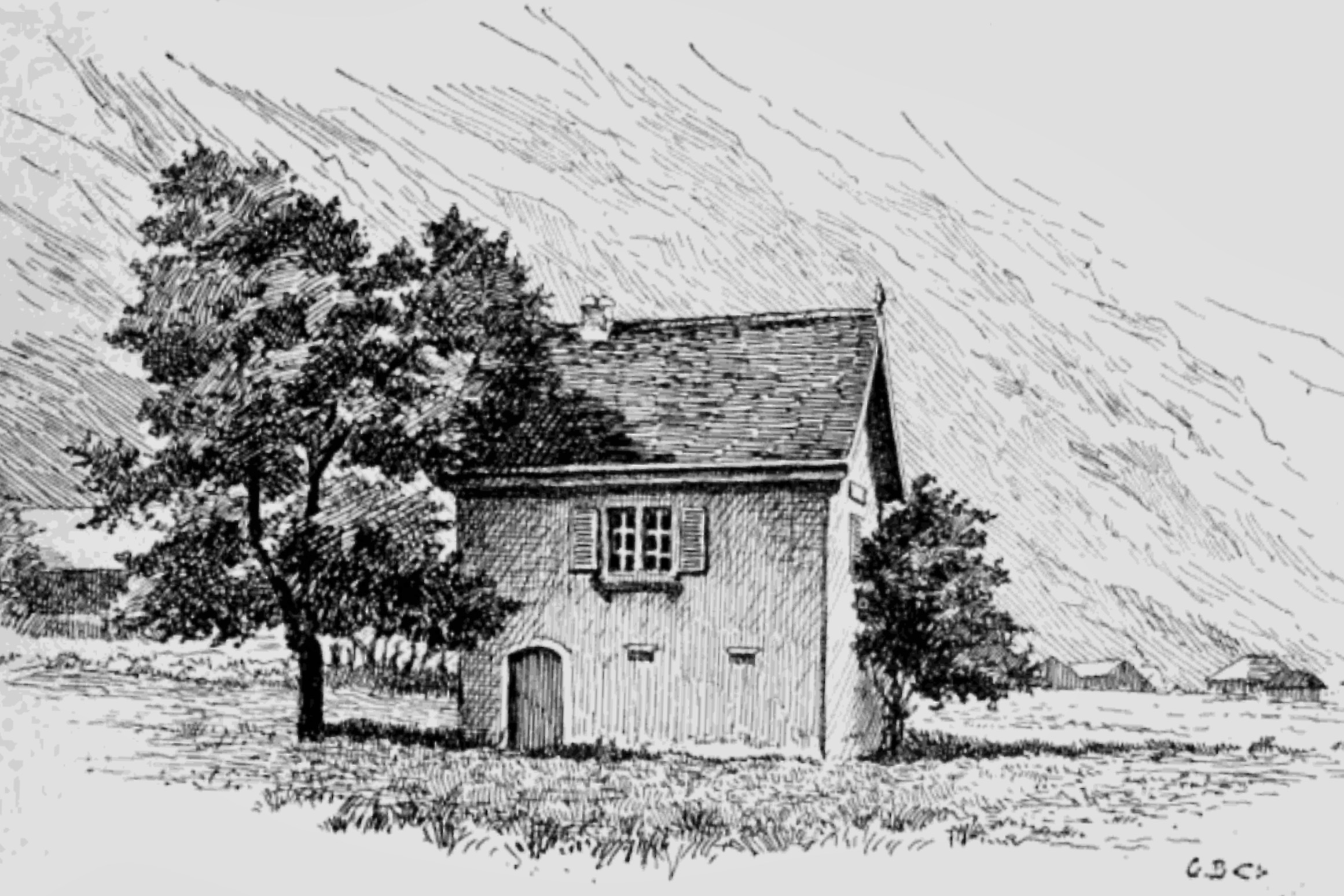
Suvorov House near Glarus

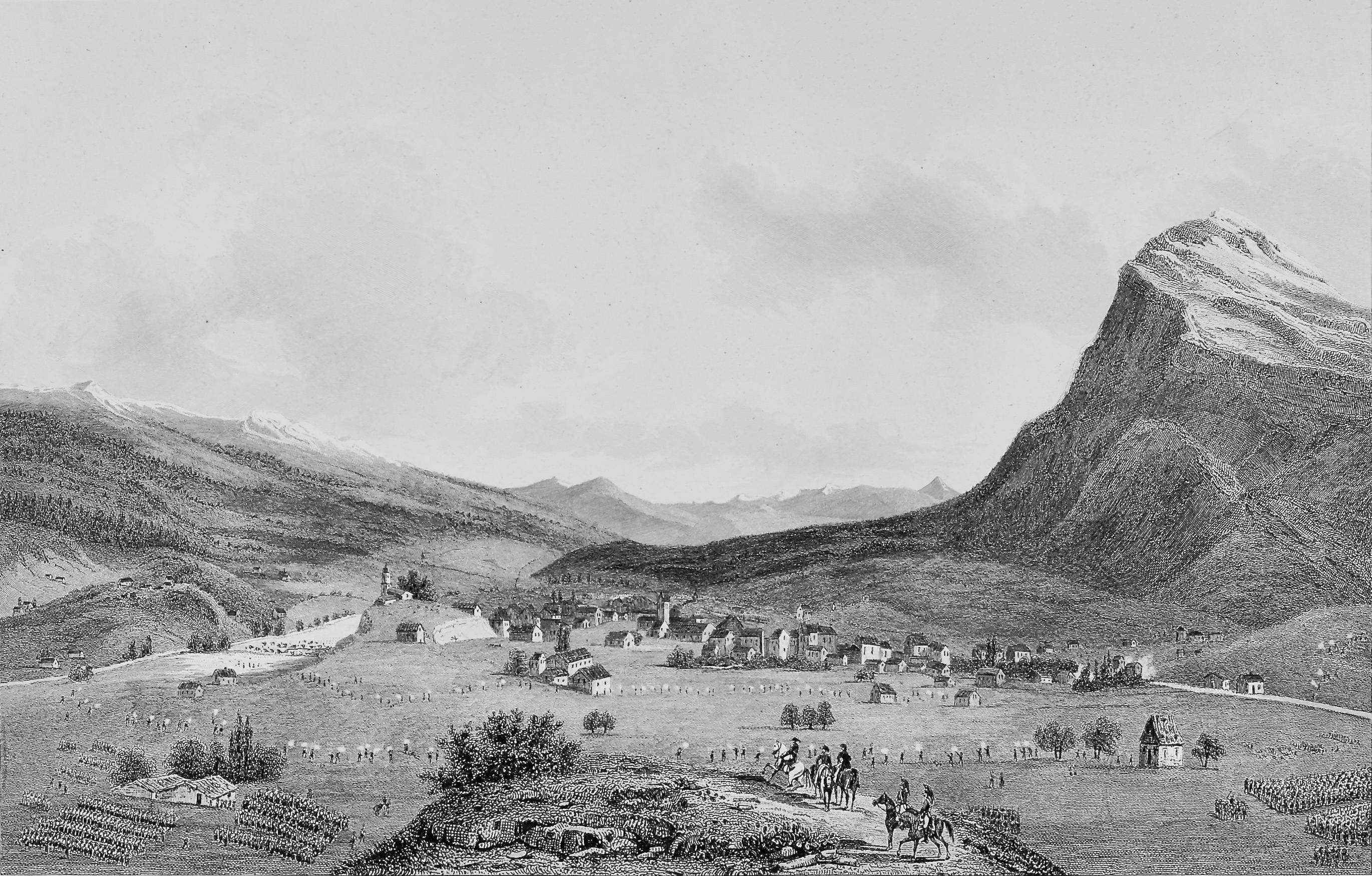
Withdrawal of the Russians from Glarus: Tirailleur chains; in the foreground the advancing French

In order not to be cut off from Rosenberg, Suvorov moved into a camp south of Netstal after the Battle of Glarus. His headquarters were in Glarus; from October 1 to 4—in the Suworowhäuschen (Landstrasse 97); last night—in the aforementioned Haus in der Wiese. As a precaution, Soult made arrangements for a possible retreat back to Lake Zurich, but the Russians made no further attempt to break through.

After Suvorov had called on Molitor to surrender on 29 September in order not to be encircled, this fate now threatened him: While Masséna was preparing to deal with the remnants of Korsakov's corps, the Bavarian contingent, and Condé's Armée des Émigrés on the Thur, Molitor's brigade and Gazan's division were to attack from the north under the command of Soult, whom he kept close to him, Molitor's brigade and Gazan's division were to attack Field Marshal in Glarus from the north, Brigadier General Louis Henri Loison from the south, and Brigadier General Édouard Mortier with two demi-brigades from the Klöntal (Klön Valley). Loison reached Luchsingen from the Klausenpass on 1 October with a battalion from Lecourbe's division.

The day after the Battle of Glarus/Näfels, the Russians held a war council at which 8 out of 10 generals advocated retreat to the Surselva. Above all, according to his adjutant Colonel Komarovsky, this was done by the 20-year-old Grand Prince Konstantin, who took part in Suvorov's campaign as a volunteer. The Russian colonel Paul Tiesenhausen remembered:

Standing in this valley, we could clearly see how the French columns from both sides were hurrying towards the mountain crest to reach Glarus [or the entrance to the Sernftal] before us. To avoid this danger, a further attack on Waasen [Weesen] had to be avoided and we had to hurry to reach the town [Schwanden?] before the enemy, because otherwise we ran the risk of being surrounded by them, of having every way out of this pocket cut off and perhaps of being destroyed by our side in a desperate fight due to the overwhelming superiority of numbers. It was probably the most critical moment for us in this campaign, which everyone felt to the core. It was here, too, that the venerable old field marshal, sensing the full danger that threatened us, grabbed his gray hair and exclaimed to those around him: 'Never say of a man before his death that he has always been happy' [...]

According to Gryazev's diary, it was assumed that Suvorov had already decided in the Muota Valley to leave "this miserable Switzerland" by the shortest route. The momentum of the battle then led to the advance to Näfels "against his and our will". The unexpected attacks by the French on Rosenberg in the Muotatal would have resulted in a delay of two days in the withdrawal.

Clausewitz attributed it to Suvorov's "hatred of the Austrians" that "like a stubborn Tartar-Khan with his horde, he suddenly diverted and rode home."

The early onset of winter made crossing the 2407m high Panixer Pass hell. Auffenberg, who had to pass it first, had advised against retreating this way because the soldiers were not only "completely without ammunition, money, bread", but also "for the most part without shoes".

Masséna reported to the Directory in Paris (at the same time he mentioned nothing about the victory at Näfels):

Since General Suvorov was informed of my plan and of the movements of Generals Loison and Mortier and was exhausted by the bloody battles that he had fought from Bellinzona to Glarus he had to deliver without ceasing, the country could neither provide him with food nor provide him with any help and he had already had to leave behind most of his luggage, his mules and his ammunition, and had to throw some of his artillery into the lakes, he wanted to take advantage of the only way out that remained to him, [...] to withdraw via Schwanden into the valley of Engi and to Graubünden, hitting those of his wounded who still had the least strength and left us in Muotathal, Glarus and all the surrounding villages more than 2,000 of them who were no longer able to walk.

== "Battle of two worlds" ==
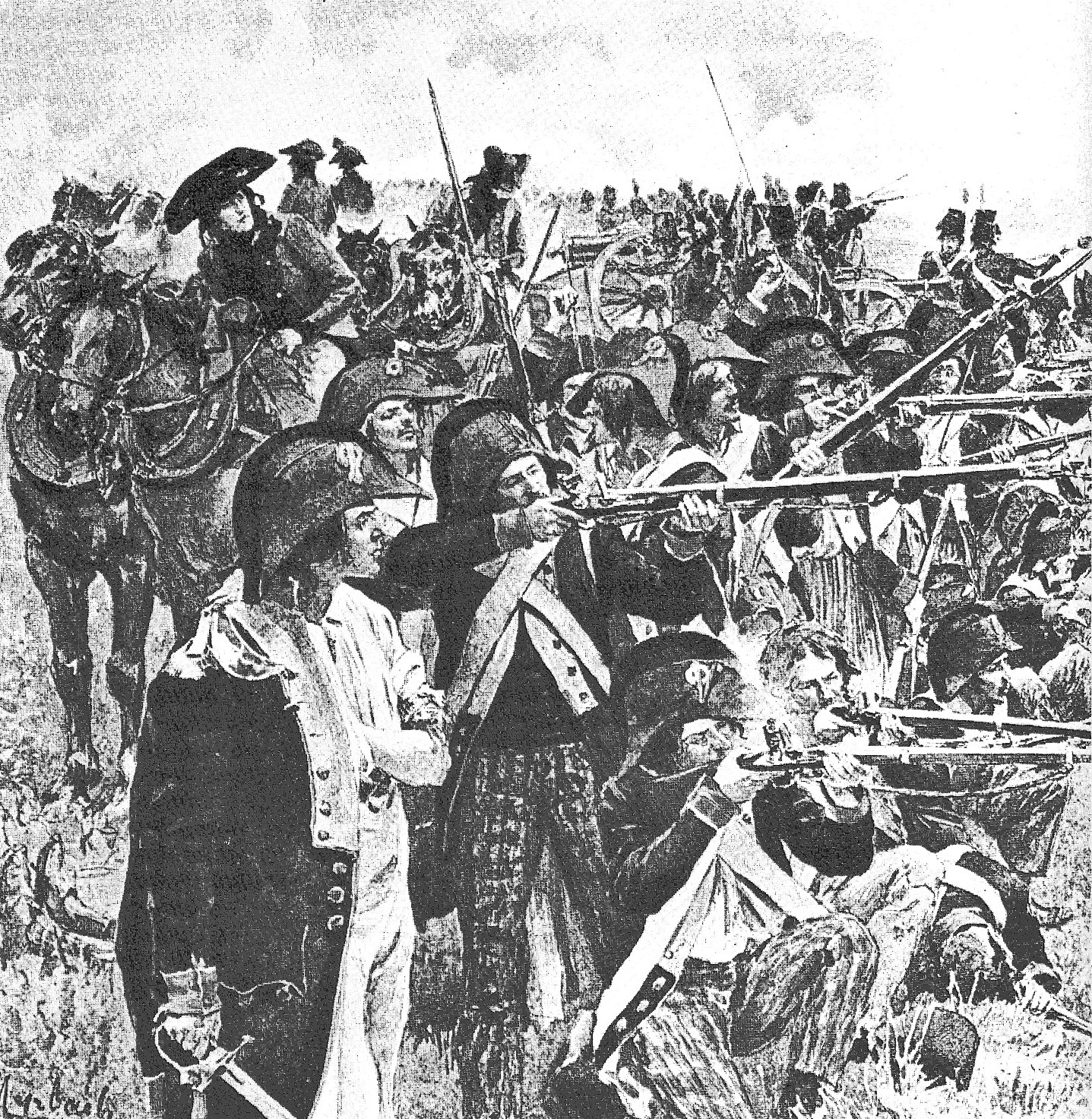
Republicans' trump cards: voluntariness and equality

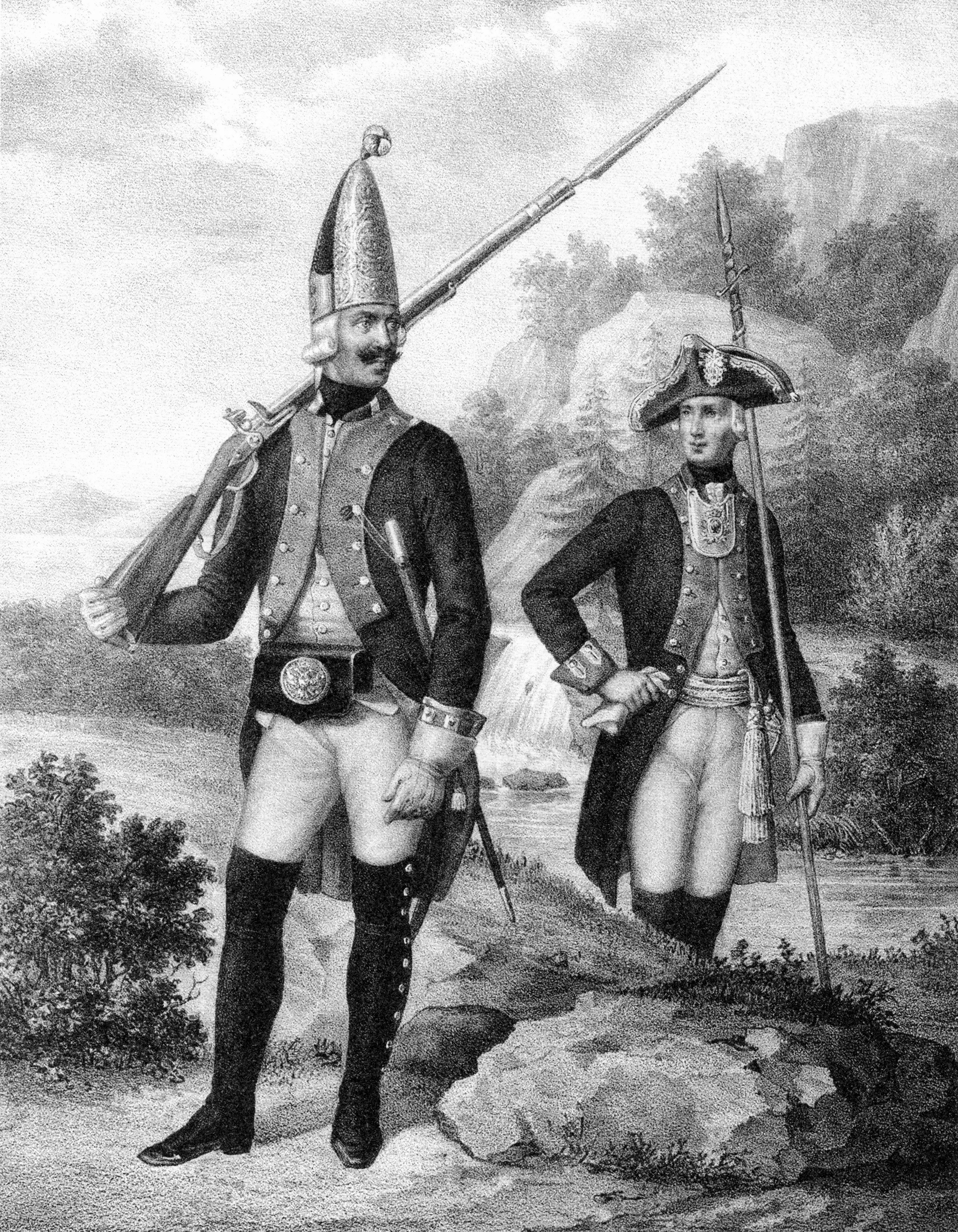
"Stiff puppet creatures": Russian grenadier NCO and Officer

In the French revolutionary armies people addressed each other as "citizens". The soldiers were volunteers, no one could become an officer without war experience. The Imperial Russian Army faced extremely unequal castes; it was reorganized to be modeled on the outdated Prussian Army thanks to Emperor Paul I, which Suvorov opposed.

In a report for the French, Tadeusz Kościuszko wrote about the Russians: "They are machines that only move on the orders of their officers." The principle is to always attack first. When the soldiers are allowed to advance on the enemy, they are given plenty of brandy to encourage them to fight; "then they attack with courage and a kind of fury, and would rather be killed than retreat. The only way to shake them is to kill many of their officers. Then the fear of being cut down one by one takes hold of them and causes them to seek salvation in flight." The officers are also mostly brave, but "very few have education or even minimal military knowledge; there are many lowlifes, fops and daredevils among them; in general they are all cruel and barbaric". Poland's national hero (who died in Solothurn in 1817) concluded: "In short, the superior knowledge of the French generals, the incomparable bravery of the Republican soldier are the best guarantors of the victory."

Wilhelm Meyer described the two armies in the Second Battle of Zurich. As per him, the majority of the French soldiers were very young, while the Russians were 25 to 40 years old. Most French generals were "at their strongest, some of them only in their early manhood" and had "quick orientation, correct sense of proportion, skill in the use of various types of weapons". According to Meyer, the French were always happy. They were trained "joking and playing, as it were". "The scattered style of fencing" – the tirailleuring – "had become second nature to the lively, active, skilful Frenchman." They would have climbed the steepest valley edges and mountains and fell into the flanks of their enemy operating along the roads "with uncommon ease". The Russians, on the other hand, according to Meyer, "were forcibly trained into stiff puppet creatures". Under Suvorov they primarily practiced the bayonet attack. Their line infantry were not trained in tirailleuring. An "immoderate cargo train" made Suvorov's army cumbersome.

There were cases when Russian soldiers did not know how to shoot a musket, but at the same time they were brave enough to carry out bayonet attacks. As Suvorov himself claimed, "the bullet is a mad thing; only the bayonet knows what it is about" or (according to another interpretation) "the bullet is a fool, the bayonet is a fine chap". According to British Lt. Col. William Stewart, who took part in the Second Battle of Zurich, "I have never met such incorrigible fools in battle, from general to ensign", the Russians suffered losses "beyond any proportion I could have imagined had I not witnessed them myself," because they were "courageous soldiers, unconcerned with their lives, ready to be led to anything, but completely ignorant of the use of their musket as a firearm." Also the later Russian-service general Carlo Giuseppe Trinchieri di Venanzone [it], who was a lieutenant during Suvorov's Swiss campaign, reported "that the Russian infantry were brave beyond expression and excelled in bayonet charges on the plain, but at that time they did not know how to fire a rifle shot."

The smoothbore, flintlock muzzle-loading rifles fired cartridges that contained the gunpowder and the bullet in a paper case. The French Musket Model 1777 (caliber 18 mm) was more precise than the Russian one. According to Meyer, there were accidents with the Russians because they loaded extremely quickly, but their powder was "of extremely poor quality". They had bayonets almost twice as long as the French. In addition, their officers also wore the halberd-like spontoon, which had long since been abolished in France, and their NCOs a "short rifle" similar to spontoon. The Cossacks sometimes stabbed the wounded to death with their lances, "but they were not heroes in front of the enemy".

Suvorov only had 25 one-and-a-half-pounder cannon from Piedmont, as well as light Austrian cannons (small-caliber). These did not achieve the same effect as Molitor's field gun of the Gribeauval system, especially if these were loaded with grapeshot.

The French infantryman could be recognized by his dark blue coat, the Russian by his dark green coat. Neither of them were yet wearing shakos, which were supposed to protect against saber blows, but rather black felt hats that were opened up. The French grenadiers had red horsehair bushes on them. (Bear skin hats [de], according to Meyer, were only seen at parades.) The headgear of the Russian grenadiers was high, pointed tin caps.

In contrast to the Red Swiss which the mediation government provided to Napoleon, the soldiers of the Demi-brigades auxiliaires helvétiques au solde de la République Française wore blue coats like the French infantrymen. They came from all parts of the country. However, according to the published lists, only three officers from the canton of Linth served in the 2nd Half Brigade: Battalion Commander Friedrich Spälti von Mollis, Captain Heinrich Spälti von Netstal, and Lieutenant Samuel Zybach von Niederurnen. In the other Helvetic half-brigades, there were 21, and in the standing troops of the Helvetic Republic, there were eight.

The caricaturist David Hess, a witness to the 2nd Battle of Zurich, claimed that the French behaved better in Switzerland than the Russians, whom he called "the most savage and stupid people in Europe" after being horrified by their treatment of prisoners, and claimed that "priests encouraged them in this". Hess is contradicted by a statement to the Helvetic Directory, issued by Government Commissioner [de] J. Theiler after Suvorov's retreat, which stated that "Russian discipline and their treatment of the city of Glarus, in particular, were unexpectedly good and generous, so that essentially only the peasants suffered irreparable damage to their livestock in the Alps and forage in the valleys." Two caricatures by Hess show that the French also behaved differently when quartered in the city and in the countryside.

About the attack on the Gotthard Pass, where the Russians faced fewer than 1,000 French, reports Gryazev's diary: "As for the enemy prisoners, we had none in this battle: bayonet relieved us of the unnecessary trouble of carrying them with us, especially since there were no Austrians here with us, and apart from them none of us took on this menial duty."

== Death toll ==
According to Suvorov's Austrian lieutenant colonel Franz Weyrother, around 7,000 men were "held inactive" by 2,000 Frenchmen at Näfels. Molitor wrote of the victory of 3,000 French over 15,000 Russians. Jean B. F. Koch reduced the number of Russians to 6,000. This figure was taken over by the presumptive editor of Gryazev's diary. Rudolf v. Reding-Biberegg's statement claims that Bagration, initially, only had 2,400 Austrians and 1,760 Russian grenadiers and Jäger, but then "probably" received reinforcements from Shveikovsky's division.

According to Clausewitz, Suvorov had 10,000 men at his disposal on 1 October, but he only used some of them. According to Louis Hennequin, the total strength of his army from 1 September to the beginning of October was 706 officers and 20,579 soldiers; it was reduced to 575 officers and 15,479 soldiers. Before his withdrawal from Glarus (4 October), around 10 battalions or 6,000–7,000 men from Gazan's division confronted him. These could have been supported by 3 other battalions of the same army unit stationed in Schänis. The other generals subordinate to Soult were too far away: Mortier in the Muotatal, Jean Baptiste Brunet and Jean-Baptiste Drouet d'Erlon in Einsiedeln, Anne de Laval in Lichtensteig.

The painting in Molitor's possession shows a murderous fight in which the opponents interlock with each other. The French general estimated his own losses at 140 killed and 400 wounded, including all battalion chiefs of his 84th Demi-brigade and many officers, and the Russian losses at 400 killed, 1,700 wounded and 200 prisoners. Gaston Bodart estimated that both parties together lost 3,300 men through even death or wounding. For comparison: for the battles near Zurich, the same author mentions "bloody losses" of 3,500 and 10,000 men, respectively, for Schänis and Muotatal of 2,000 and 1,500 men, respectively. According to Steven T. Ross, 36% of the soldiers engaged at Näfels suffered fatal or non-fatal injuries, compared to slightly less than 7% on average for all battles between 1792 and 1802. The battles in which the people of Glarus supported the Austrians from May to August 1799, as well as the battle at Wollerau the year before, were, against this background, insignificant skirmishes.

According to Molitor, the 2nd Helvetic Half Brigade lost 8 officers and 40 soldiers at the Näfels bridge, but according to their commander, Colonel Johannes Tobler from Ermatingen, a total of 75 out of 300 men, without the fallen captain Hans Pfander von Belp and 8 wounded officers. Albert Maag and Markus Feldmann estimated the Swiss' losses at 20 officers and 97 soldiers.

Even the two commanders were not spared: Bagration suffered a "grapeshot contusion" on his thigh in the Klöntal. And a wound opened in Molitor during the battle, which resulted from a bullet through the thigh in 1795.

According to Government Commissioner Theiler, the Russians brought around 1,200 French prisoners from the Muotatal to Glarus and left behind 2,600 wounded, prisoners and dead. Of the slightly wounded Russians, 800–900 are said to have crossed the Panixer Pass and 400–500 were taken prisoner.

According to Hennequin, when Suvorov arrived in Chur, he had barely 14,000 men left (including 10,000 infantry). During the 16 days in Switzerland he had lost around 6,000 men, over a third of them at Näfels.

== Result ==
The outcome of the Battle of Glarus was ambiguous:

- Netstal is a Russian victory, and Näfels is a French one. Suvorov's vanguard under Bagration was eventually stopped, but Suvorov's immediate target was Glarus.
- Old and modern Russian sources claim Russian victory/success at Glarus.
- Gaston Bodart, bolding "Näfels" in the name of the battle and naming only Bagration as the commander of the Allies, claims a French victory.
- The main goal of the Russians was to secure a safe exit from Switzerland (at the time of the battle), and accordingly, to take Glarus, and this was accomplished.
  It is noted that the Russians captured Netstal and temporarily Näfels, which allowed the main troops to occupy Glarus. Bagration retreated only after that, repelling the French attacks towards Netstal.

=== Judgments ===
Masséna wrote to Molitor on 31 October: "[...] it will not be forgotten that you with your only brigade resisted the Austro-Russians for several days, that you beat them, that you took prisoners from them, that you with tenacity and cold blood defended important positions for the army and that in this way you prepared the defeat of Suvorov. Therefore, today receive the expression of the lively satisfaction of the government for your actions, which it could not overlook and which it knew how to assess correctly."

Clausewitz reasoned: "Thus Molitor with his 4 or 5 battalions fought on the 25th and 26th against Jelačić, on the 28th and 29th against Linken, on the 30th against Auffenberg and on October 1st against Bagration, and against all of them with admirable success, so that this multiplication of a single brigade, this stubborn resistance to an ever new enemy, must be considered one of the most beautiful deeds of the campaign."

Based on Jomini, Suvorov failed to link up with Linken's division before its retreat to Graubünden and to win over the remnants of Hotze's successor, Field Marshal Lieutenant Franz Petrasch. To achieve this, according to Jomini, he would have had to drive Molitor's brigade out of Glarus with a strong advance guard on 27 September and, on the 28th, break through Toggenburg and Sargans with the main body of the army at Mollis and Weesen.

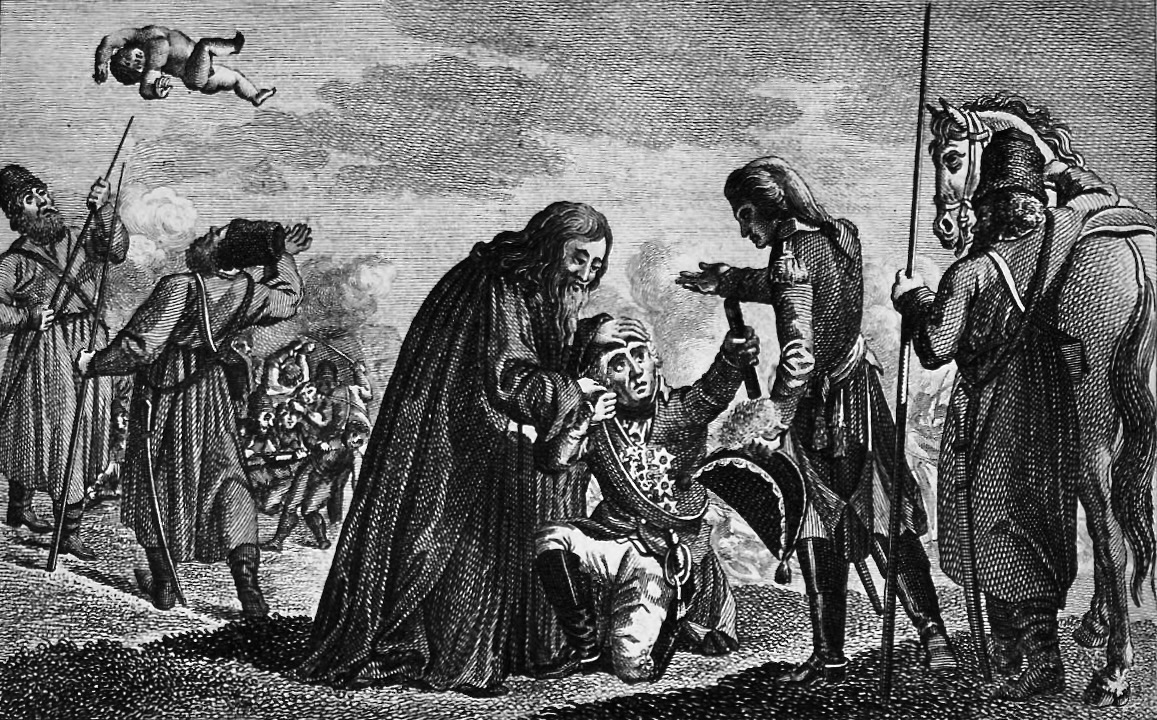
German caricature: atrocity scene with Cossacks, Suvorov as penitent

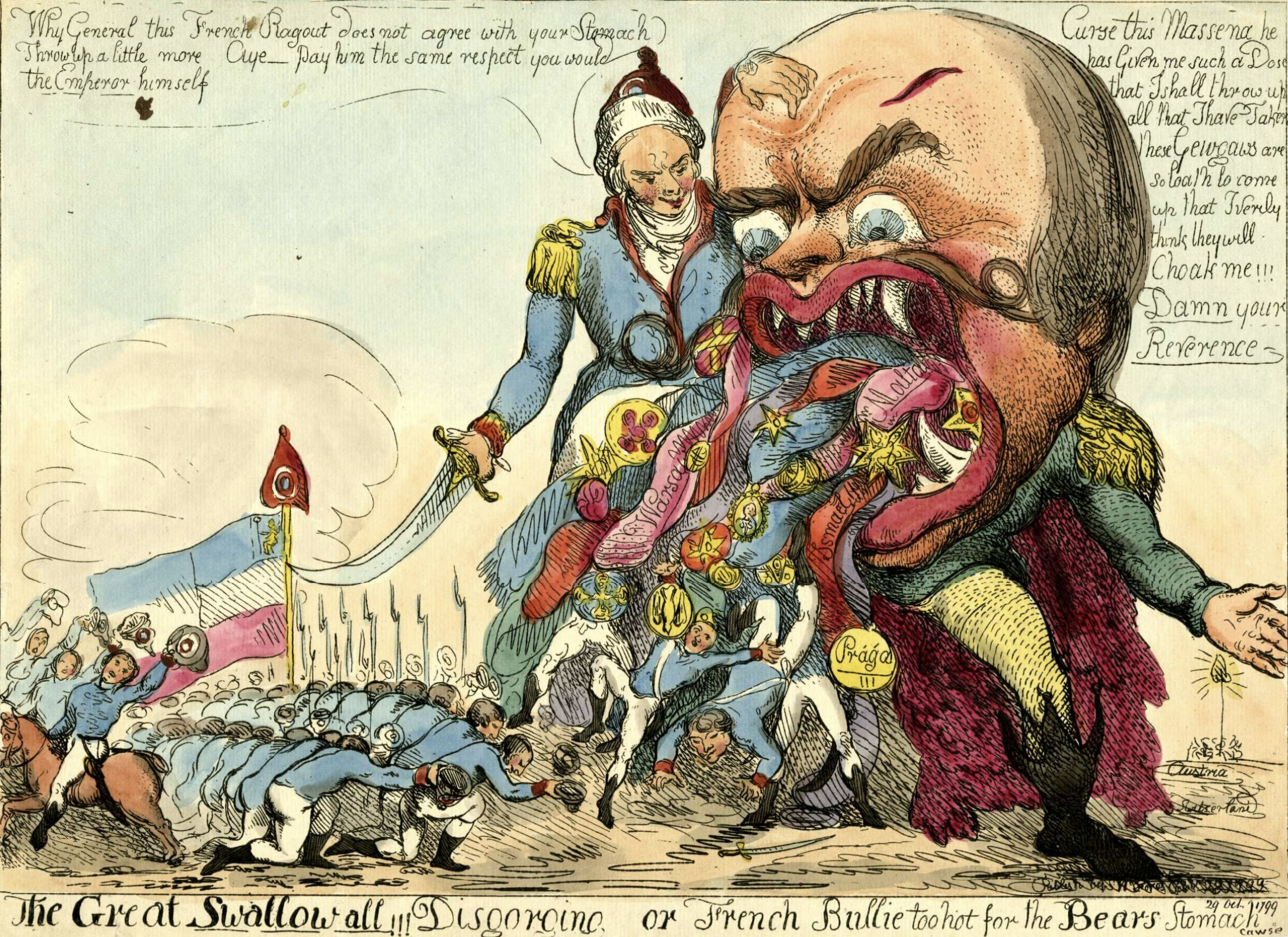
Caricature of an oppositional British: Masséna defeats "cannibal Suvorov." By John Cawse.

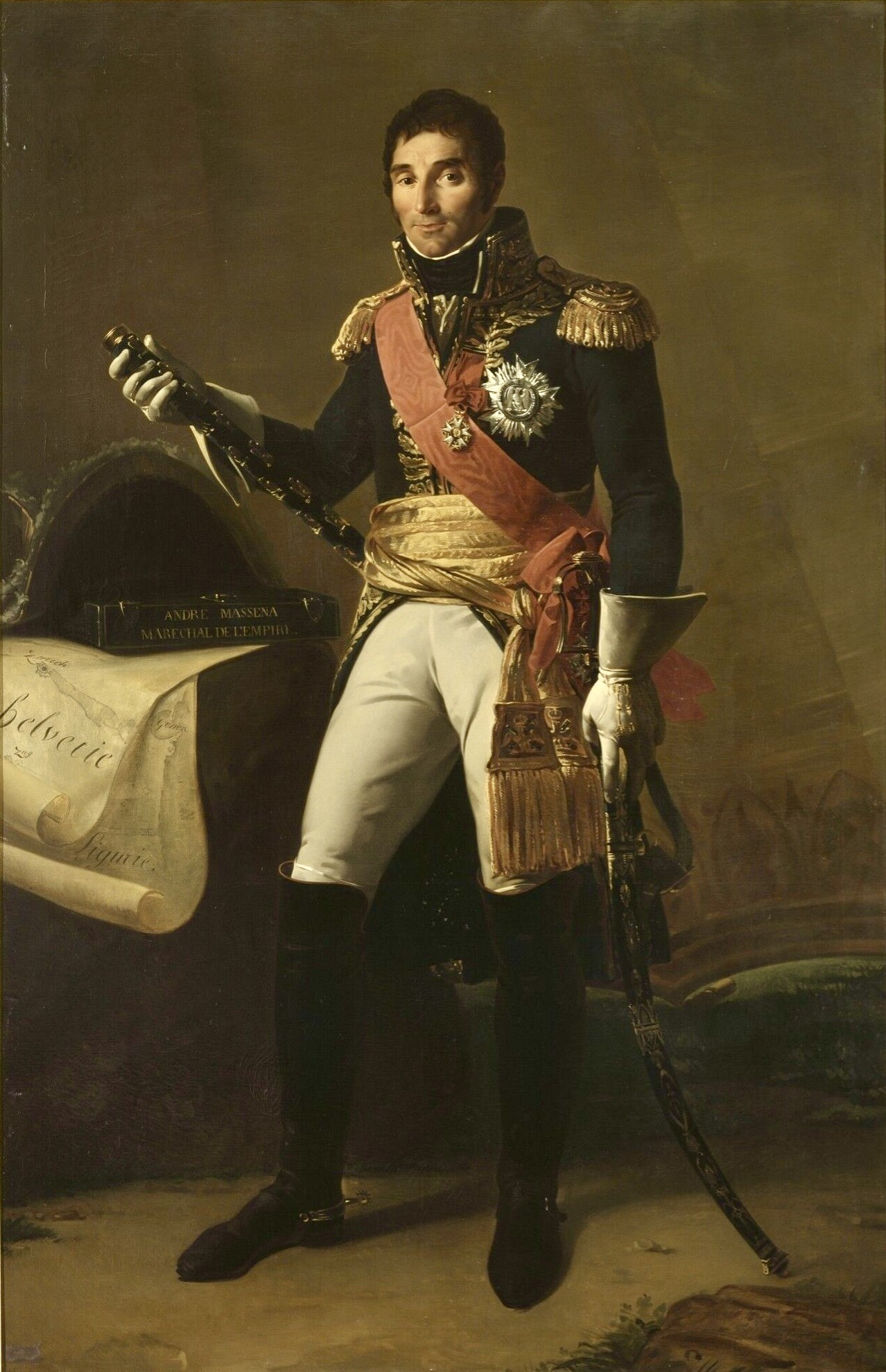
Masséna as Marshal of the Empire

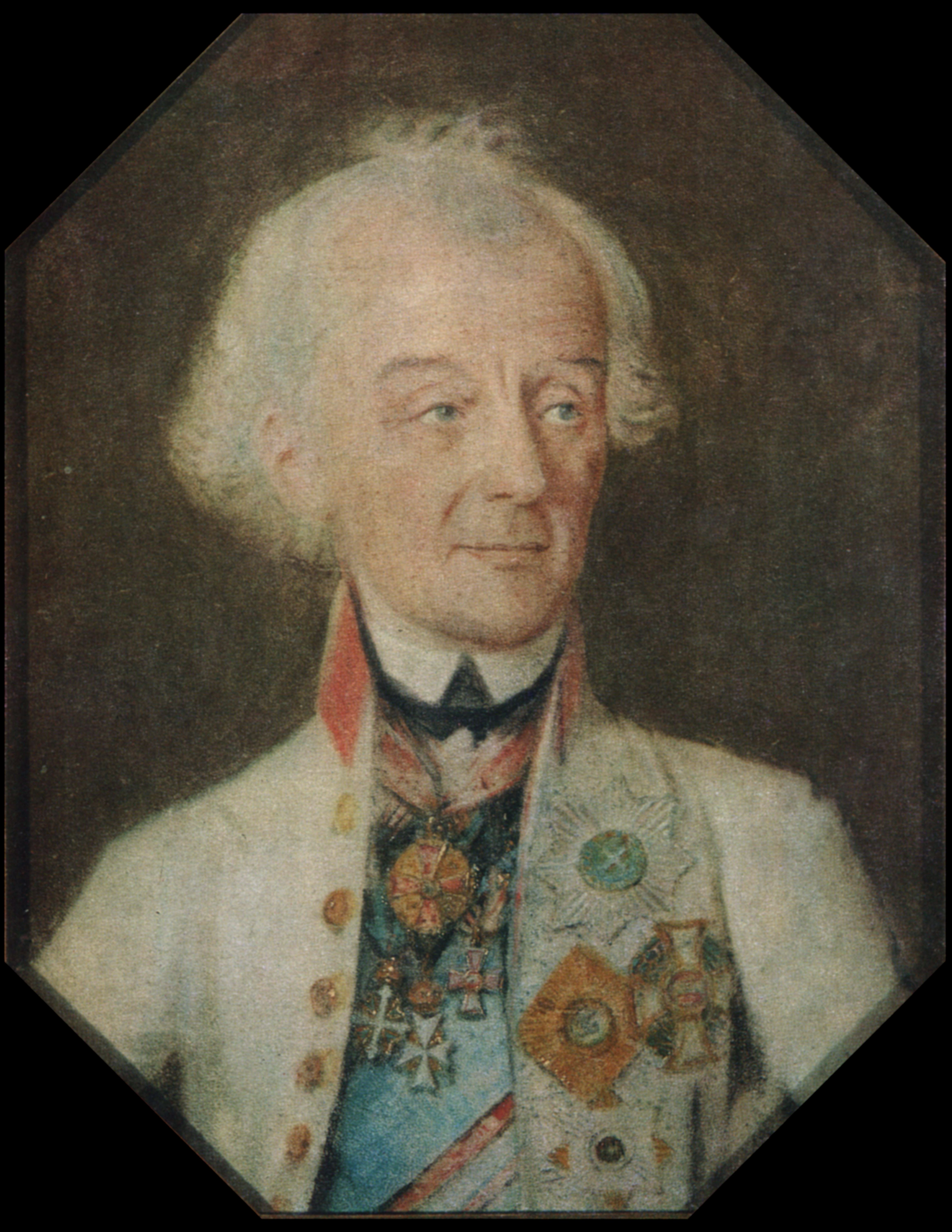
Suvorov as Generalissimus

Suvorov's British backers were devastating in their judgment of the field marshal: William Wickham, Under Secretary of State and Envoy in Switzerland, saw the Russians on 11 October in Feldkirch; "every soldier loaded with the plunder of the poor inhabitants of Uri and Glarus by whom they had been received as friends and saviors". Everyone calls the French way of imposing contributions [de] on the country a mercy compared to the plundering that Suvorov tolerated. On October 17, Wickham wrote to Foreign Minister Grenville that Suvorov's habit of eating an early lunch and then sleeping late was incompatible with the conduct of military operation, and in fact, the Russian had never visited a post or scouted a position as head of the Army of Italy. After the British envoy in Vienna, Lord Minto, made the acquaintance of Suvorov in Prague, he reported to Wickham on December: "Instead of a big one General and great man I find an ignorant, scheming charlatan who, by the way, is completely crazy [...]" Minto even wrote to his wife on 3 January 1800 that Suvorov was the worst madman who ever walked around free. He owes all his success in Italy to the Austrian officers on his staff (a worthy example of whom is Johann Chasteler), as only a few Russian staff officers took part in the 1799 campaign. The Austrian military formed the majority of his army; in the Battle of the Trebbia, as the best victory of the campaign, however, the majority of Suvorov's troops were Russians, who played the main role in this victory.

According to a nephew of the Russian-service lieutenant general Charles de Vioménil, who was initially slated to head the Army of Italy, Suvorov played the madman because he wanted to be original in every way. To earn the love of his soldiers, he forgave them everything, so there has never been an army with less discipline and more excess.

Weyrother, responsible for the defeats at Rivoli, Hohenlinden and Austerlitz, judged that Suvorov did not have to wait for Andrei Rosenberg and the pack animals to arrive, since "Glarus provided unexpectedly good and better meat, potatoes and bread than they earned." Rather, "this unexpectedly good hospitality may have been the innocent cause of the delay, which was in every respect so disadvantageous and disgraceful". "General timidity, supported by Grand Princely cowardice," overruled the field marshal, "who until then alone recognized the reasons that called for the offensive march to Walenstadt." Suvorov should not have brought forward the "completely improper" argument about the lack of ammunition, "since he so extols the advantages of the naked rifle". Weyrother called the Grand Duke Konstantin Pavlovich (who was educated by a member of the Swiss Directorate, Frédéric-César de La Harpe) and his entourage people "whose brains were as empty of military knowledge as their chins were of hair, even though the feathered hat made them a general".

Auffenberg wrote in connection with the battle: "FM ended here. Suvorov, his victorious career, could no longer be persuaded to make an attack, no matter how advantageous [...] and, after leaving behind all the wounded, all his artillery and ammunition, he retreated over the Panix Mountain to Graubünden, during which a few 100 men froze to death, and almost all of his cavalry forces were destroyed."

The Suvorov literature does not even describe the defeat at Näfels as a battle. So Christopher Duffy, entitled "The Breakout from the Klöntal and the Check at Näfels" created the false impression that the final result was one to one, as it may seem to some [?].

Fred Heer wrote without ifs and buts: "The fact that the Russian campaign in Switzerland became a fiasco cannot be blamed on Suvorov." Alexander Statiev, on the other hand, judged: "Suvorov did not expect problems in the Alps because he was convinced that he could easily sweep away the small French garrisons stationed on its path. However, due to inexperience in mountain warfare, Suvorov's corps had to contend with enormous strategic, tactical and logistics challenges, lost half of its troop strength and was unable to achieve its objectives." Conclusion of the Russo-Canadian military scientist: "Although all previous battles in the Swiss campaign ended in Russian victories, the failure to break out of the Alps at Näfels was a strategic defeat that destroyed all of these victories because it was the final nail in the coffin of the strategic plan, which required the cooperation of the allied forces in Switzerland."

== Emergency in Glarus ==
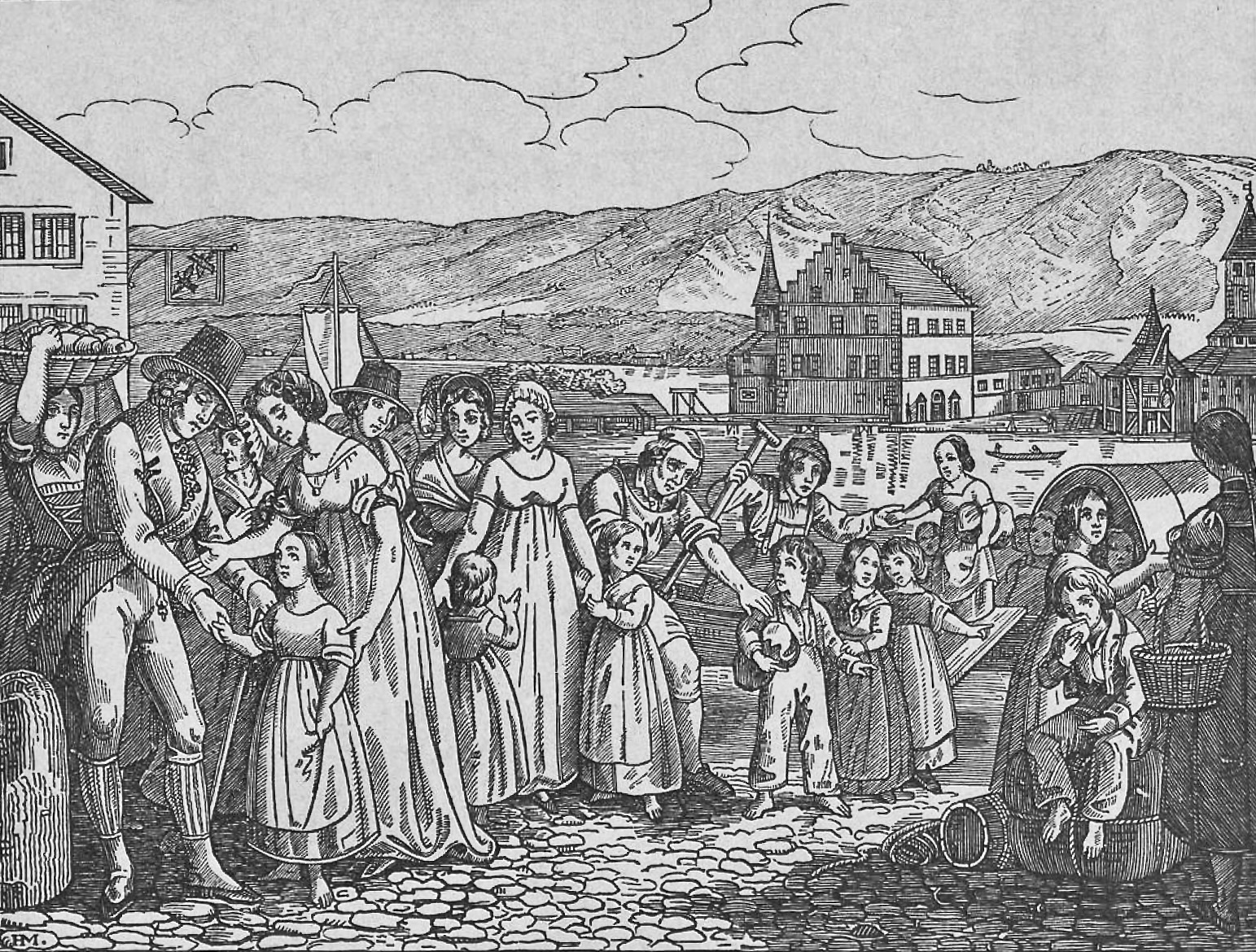
Idealized Glarus children in Zurich

The 21-year-old Maurice-François Dupin [fr], grandson of Maurice de Saxe and father of the writer George Sand, provided Molitor with courier services as chasseur à cheval. He wrote to his mother about the Canton of Glarus: "You can hear the roar of the torrents that fall from the rocks, the whistle of the wind in the forests. But no more shepherds' songs, no more mooing of the flocks. The wooden houses had been hastily abandoned. Everything had fled from our sight. The residents had retreated into the interior of the mountains with their cattle. No living creature in the villages. This canton presented the picture of the saddest desert."

After Suvorov's withdrawal, the interim Government Commissioner Johann Peter Zwicky ordered that every community in the Glarus and Schwanden districts "should immediately remove and have holed up the dead horses lying in their farms and other animals left in the open fields and on the roads". Since knacker was a "dishonest profession" [de], he declared in a further decree that this did not apply to the "so necessary assistance in the removal of these animals that would otherwise contaminate everything".

The first Swiss census of 1798 recorded 22,809 inhabitants in the districts mentioned. The Neues Helvetische Tagblatt reported from Glarus: "For 14 days, 60,000 men have passed through the land where neither grain nor wine grows, all food has been used up, and the hay has also run out, so that almost all of them become dairy cattle have to sell or slaughter."

Netstal wrote to the Swiss Directorate: "When they moved in, the Russians plundered quite a bit; a house was also burned down and we had to maintain over 1,200 horses for 4 days. We lost most of the hay from both powers and because of bad weather the troops in the camp also needed a lot more than the hay, wood, potatoes, fences and stables that were damaged at best; many Frankish (French) soldiers also indulged in excess." General Molitor ordered that Mollis and Näfels had to take over Netstal's share of the deliveries of hay, wood, etc. The Netstal municipality's behavior towards the French troops was "respectable and republican". It has already delivered a lot and suffered more than the others, although her "lucky circumstances" are not the best.

On the initiative of the new 24-year-old Government Commissioner Niklaus Heer, brother of the late Joachim Heer, the pastors in Glarus and Ennenda called for money, food, household goods, clothes and other necessities of life for "the small, poor community Riederen" to donate—a "love tax" that brought in a fairly significant amount of money and goods.

In a "Call from the suffering humanity in the Canton of Linth to the compassionate Swiss" in the Wochenblatt für den Kanton Linth it says about the Glarus land: "[...] these valleys, which used to be so rich in sources of prosperity due to industry and trade all over the world, now lie prostrate [...] and the mountains of them are, as it were, raising their hands up to you for help [...]"

At the beginning of 1800, on the initiative of the Interior Minister of the Helvetic Republic, Albrecht Rengger [de], thousands of children from the cantons Waldstätten, Linth and Säntis, whose families could no longer feed them due to the war were placed with foster parents in other parts of the country, with 1,250 of them came from Glarus. The following description shows the poverty in which the lower classes of the mountain regions must have lived: "The overwhelming majority of the resettled children grew up in poverty and idleness, were rude, ignorant, illiterate, unclean, hostile to industry, often thieves, even more often deceitful, malicious and afflicted with other vices."

The later Federal Councilor Joachim Heer, the grandson of the government commissioner of the same name, described the state of the country after the warlike events of the summer and autumn of 1799 as follows: "The state—both the Helvetic Republic and the canton—without any financial resources, the communities exhausted by cruel requisitions; the wealthy sucked dry by an incredible billeting burden; the farmer stripped of livestock and fodder supplies; the poorer class without food and as a result of the complete stagnation of industry, without earnings [...]"

== Variety ==
- In a Abschiedsrede an den General Suwarow, 'Farewell Speech to General Suvorov', H. Zschokke wrote: "When you arrived in Altdorf, you said very modestly: You wanted to become the Redeemer, Deliverer and Savior of Switzerland [...] "You were a savior because you cured the madness of many thousands of Swiss who hoped that you and the imperialists would bring us freedom, order, happiness, and peace. You were a savior because your brave soldiers freed us from our hay, cattle, clothing, and money." He finally made them happy and blessed them "when you rode away again with your sack and knapsack".

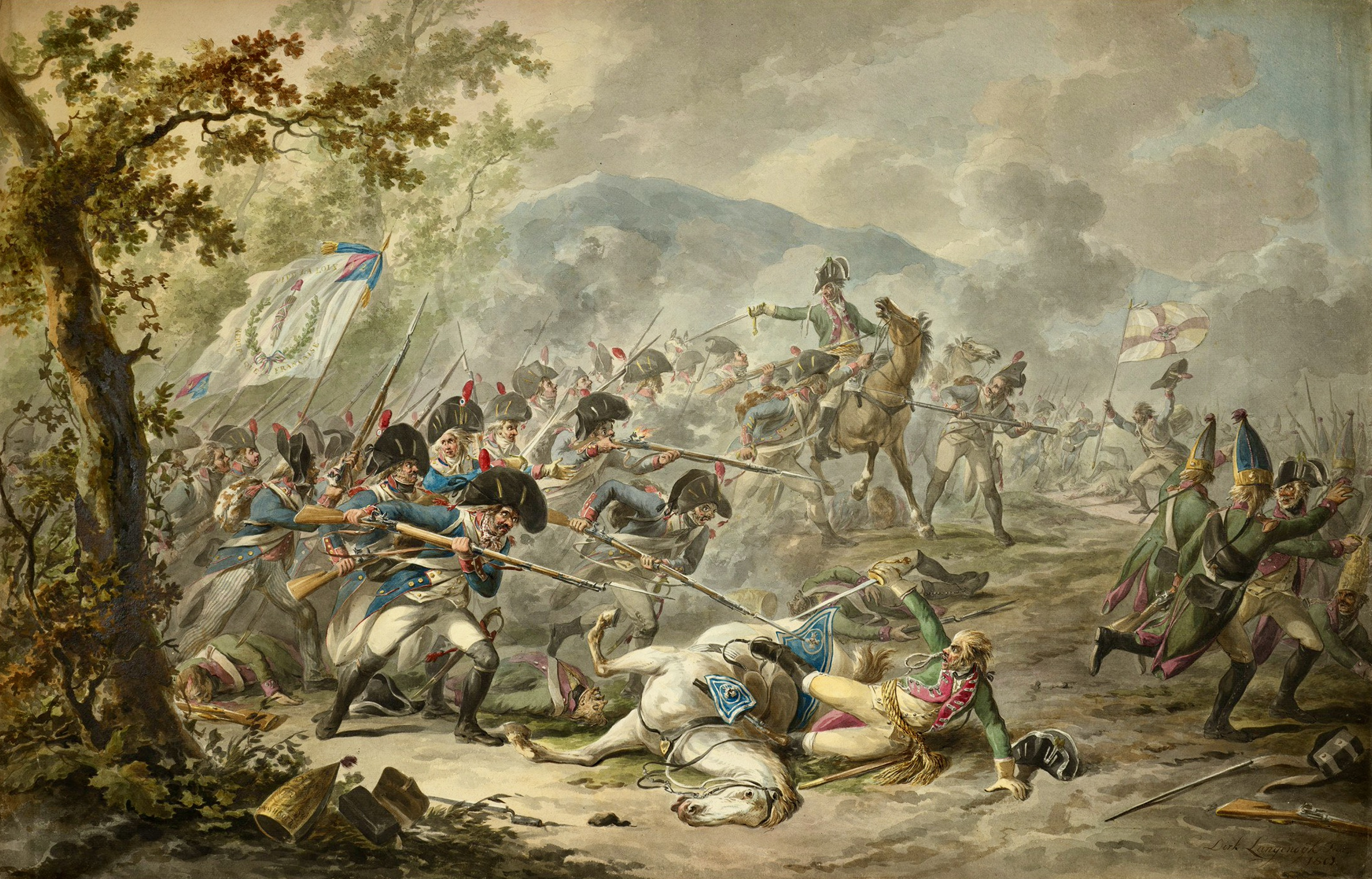
French and Russian grenadiers; capturing General Fersen

- The Anglo-Russian invasion of Holland (Netherlands) also failed. On 19 September 1799, Russian Lieutenant General Johann Hermann von Fersen was captured by the French near Bergen, and on 6 October the coalition suffered another defeat at Castricum. Like the Armée d'Helvétie in 1798, the Armée de Batavie was commanded by General Guillaume Brune.
- Paul I appointed Suvorov generalissimo on 28 October. But he canceled the anti-French coalition. On the return journey to Russia, Suvorov fell ill and fell into disgrace for violating regulations. Four weeks after his return he died on 18 May 1800—"unnoticed by the official Petersburg".
- On 9 November 1799, Bonaparte, returning home from Egypt, seized power in France and declared the Revolution over (Coup of 18 Brumaire). In 1803 he dissolved the Helvetic Republic as Médiateur de la Confédération de Suisse. This and the collapse of his Empire in 1814/15 made it easier for the losers of Näfels to suppress the memory of this decisive battle.
- For the murder of eight Russians in Näfels, 27-year-old Wachtmeister Barthélemy Barbal from Anthe (Wallonia), one of the few foreigners serving in the Helvetic half(demi)-brigades, was promoted to the rank of unterleutnant by the Directory of the Helvetic Republic on 3 January 1800.
- After Paul I had actually sided with France through a policy of armed neutrality, he was murdered on 23 March 1801. Switzerland and the new cantons that emerged from former subject territories owe the fact that they survived the fall of Napoleon to Paul's son and successor Alexander I. (He was also a student of La Harpe.)
- Molitor, who, like Zschokke, had shown understanding for the opponents of the Helvetic Republic, was involved in the suppression of the Spanish Revolution in 1823, for which he received the Marshal's baton.
- There is no monograph about the Battle of Näfels. Hartmann's 1892 criticism of the Russian Suvorov cult was not taken into account by R.-Biberegg, Duffy or Fred Heer, but only mentioned in a footnote or in the bibliography. The Rapport des opérations de la brigade du général Molitor, 'Report of the operations of General Molitor's brigade' Hartmann didn't even know.

== Sources ==
- Egorshina, O.; Petrova, A. (2023). История русской армии [The history of the Russian Army] (in Russian). Moscow: Edition of the Russian Imperial Library. ISBN 978-5-699-42397-2.
- Materialsammlung zu den Vorgängen im Glarnerland während des Jahres 1799. Diverse Abschriften, mehrere Ausgaben des Wochenblattes für den Kanton Linth, der Glarner-Zeitung und des Schweizer-Boten sowie andere gedruckte Schriften. Landesarchiv des Kantons Glarus, PA 2.A 1:4.
- Bulletin officiel du Directoire Helvétique et des autorités du Canton du Léman. Lausanne, 20. Sept. 1799, S. 130 f.; 11. Okt. 1799, S. 264; 13. Okt. 1799, S. 283; 16. Okt. 1799, S. 299; 17. Okt. 1799, S. 307 f. (Digital link).
- Johann Konrad Escher, Paul Usteri (Hrsg.): Neues helvetisches Tagblatt. Bern, 7. Okt. 1799, S. 56; 8. Okt. 1799, S. 68; 14. Okt. 1799, S. 96; 17. Okt. 1799, S. 116; 30. Okt. 1799, S. 203 f. (e-periodica.ch).
- Gazette nationale ou le Moniteur universel. Paris, 15. Okt. 1799, S. 86; 21. Okt. 1799, S. 109; 23. Okt. 1799, S. 117 (Digitalisat).
- Ludwig Ferdinand Huber (Red.): Allgemeine Zeitung. Stuttgart, 26. Okt. 1799, S. 1328 (Digital link).
- AmtsBerichte des Fürsten Suworow über seinen Feldzug in der Schweiz. In: Ludwig Ferdinand Huber (Red.): Allgemeine Zeitung. Stuttgart, 17.–26. Dez. 1799, S. 1553 f., 1562, 1566, 1570, 1574, 1584 f., 1593 f. (Digital link).
- Rapport fait par le général Massena, commandant en chef l'armée du Danube, au directoire exécutif de la république française, sur les opérations de cette armée, du 3 au 18 vendemiaire an 8. In: Gazette nationale ou le Moniteur universel. Paris, 30. Okt.–6. Nov. 1799 (retronews.fr).
- Johann Friedrich Ernst Albrecht: Kakodämon (Suworow) der Schrekliche, Pansalvins (Potjomkins) und Mirandas (Katharinas II.) Donnerkeil, Revisor des Codex der Menschen-Rechte. (Hennings), Pyropolis (Erfurt) 1800 (digitale-sammlungen.de).
- Marcus Freuler: Kurze Geschichte des veränderten Schicksals und kriegrischer Auftritten, welche den alten Kanton Glarus vom Jahr 1798 bis 1801 [!] betraffen. Buchdruckerei Glarus 1800, S. 29–31 (Digital link).
- Heinrich Zschokke: Abschiedsrede an den General Suwarow. In: Der aufrichtige und wohlerfahrene Schweizer-Bote. Luzern, 12. Febr. 1800, S. 77 f. (digitale-sammlungen.de).
- François Louis Dedon-Duclos: Relation détaillée du passage de la Limat, effectué le 3 vendémiaire an 8 [...] Cet ouvrage contient une notice historique de toutes les opérations militaires des armées du Danube et du Rhin [...] Didot jeune, Paris an 9 (1801), S. 125–127 (Digital link).
- Jean Daniel Fridolsheim. In: François Babié, Jacques Grasset Saint-Sauveur: Archives de l'honneur, ou Notices sur la vie militaire [...], 1. Band, Laurens aîné, Paris 1805, S. 137–141 (Digital link).
- Heinrich Zschokke: Historische Denkwürdigkeiten der helvetischen Staatsumwälzung. 3. Band, Steiner, Winterthur 1805, S. 252 f. (Digital link).
- Levi Feldtmann: Poetische Gedanken über die Kriegs-Vorfälle und politischen Veränderungen, welche sich im Kanton Glarus vom Jahr 1798. bis 1803. zugetragen. Ohne Ort [1810], S. 51–60 (Digital link).
- Erzherzog Karl (anonym erschienen): Geschichte des Feldzuges von 1799 in Deutschland und in der Schweiz. 2. Theil, Anton Strauss, Wien 1819, S. 253 f. (Digital link).
- Antoine-Henri Jomini: Histoire critique et militaire des guerres de la Révolution. Nouvelle édition, 12. Band, Campagne de 1799 – deuxième période. Anselin et Pochard, Paris 1822, S. 275–277, 464–466 (Relation Venanzones) (Digital link).
- Johann Samuel von Gruner: Verhältnis der Geognosie zur Kriegs-Wissenschaft, eine Skizze. In: Neue Jarbücher der Berg- und Hüttenkunde. 6. Band, 2. Lieferung, Nürnberg 1826, S. 187–233, hier S. 189, 227, 231 (digitale-sammlungen.de).
- Johannes Wieland: Geschichte der Kriegsbegebenheiten in Helvetien und Rhätien als Handbuch zum Militairunterricht für Schweizeroffiziere aller Waffen. 2. Theil, Schweighauser, Basel 1827, S. 154 f. (Digital link); 2. Aufl., 2. Band, Hugo Richter, Basel 1869, S. 163 f. (Digital link).
- Armée du Danube. Campagne des années VII et VIII (1799) en Suisse. Rapport des opérations de la brigade du général Molitor, détachée dans les cantons de Schweiz et de Glaris (1). In: Le Spectateur militaire; recueil de science, d'art et d'histoire militaires. 11. Band, 57. Lieferung, 6. Jahrgang, Noirot, Paris, 15. Mai 1831, S. 108–132, hier: S. 125–130, 132 (Digital link).
- Carl von Clausewitz: Die Feldzüge von 1799 in Italien und der Schweiz. 2. Theil (Hinterlassene Werke [hrsg. v. Marie von Clausewitz], 6. Band). Ferdinand Dümmler, Berlin 1834, S. 202 f., 206, 209 f., 251 f., 381 (Digital link).
- Georg Fuchs (Hrsg.): Correspondenz des Kais. Russ. Generalissimus, Fürsten Italiisky Grafen Alexander Wassiljewitsch Suworoff-Rimniksky über die Russisch-Oestreichische Kampagne im Jahre 1799. [...] Aus dem Russischen übersetzt von Einem Preussischen Officier. 2. Theil, Carl Heymann, Glogau/Leipzig 1835, S. 204–207, 223 (Digital link).
- Anton von Tillier: Geschichte der helvetischen Republik, von ihrer Gründung im Frühjahr 1798 bis zu ihrer Auflösung im Frühjahr 1803, vorzüglich aus dem helvetischen Archiv und andern noch unbekannten handschriftlichen Quellen. 1. Band, Chr. Fischer, Bern 1843, S. 394 f. (Digital link).
- Jean Baptiste Frédéric Koch: Mémoires de Massena rédigés d'après les documents qu'il a laissés et sur ceux du Dépot de la guerre et du Dépot des fortifications. 3. Band, Paulin et Lechevalier, Paris 1849, S. 388–390 (Digital link).
- Nikolai Alexejewitsch Polewoi: Geschichte des Fürsten Italiiski Grafen Suworoff-Rimnikski, Generallissimus [sic] der russischen Armeen. Übersetzung J. de la Croix, H. Schnakenburg, Riga 1850, S. 295 f. (Digital link).
- Jules Nollet-Fabert: Le maréchal Molitor, 1770–1849. Extrait de la Lorraine militaire, galerie historique. Selbstverlag, Nancy 1851, S. 6–12, 39 f. (gallica.bnf.fr).
- Jean-Joseph Hisely (Hrsg.): Brief eines Verstorbenen, welcher sich den von Hrn. Prof. Monnard herausgegebenen (oder zum Druck beförderten) Denkwürdigkeiten des Generals v. Roverea anreihet. In: Bernhard Rudolf Fetscherin (Red.): Historische Zeitung. Herausgegeben von der schweizerischen geschichtforschenden Gesellschaft. 2. Jahrgang, Jent & Reinert, Bern 1854, Nr. 3 f., S. 19–25, hier S. 23 f. (digitale-sammlungen.de).
- Mémoires du maréchal-général Soult, duc de Dalmatie, publiés par son fils. 2. Teil, 2. Band, Amyot, Paris 1854, S. 321 ff. (gallica.bnf.fr).
- George Sand (Pseudonym von Aurore Dupin): Histoire de ma vie. 2. Band, Michel Lévy frères, Paris 1856, S. 179, 185 f. (gallica.bnf.fr).
- Dmitri Miliutin: Geschichte des Krieges Rußlands mit Frankreich unter der Regierung Kaiser Paul's I. im Jahre 1799. Übersetzung Chr. Schmitt, 4. Band, 6. Theil, Jos. Lindauer, München 1857, Karte Nr. 43 zwischen S. 102 und 103, S. 116–119, 278–281, 284 f. (Digital link).
- Theodor von Bernhardi: Denkwürdigkeiten aus dem Leben des kaiserl. russ. Generals von der Infanterie Carl Friedrich Grafen von Toll. 2. Auflage. 1. Band, Otto Wigand, Leipzig 1865, S. 98 f. (Digital link).
- Eduard Winkelmann (Hrsg.): Suworow's Feldzug in Italien und der Schweiz. Aus den Aufzeichnungen eines Augenzeugen (Paul Tiesenhausen). In: Baltische Monatsschrift. 13. Band, Riga 1866, S. 242–259, hier S. 256–258 (Digital link).
- Johann Jakob Blumer: Der Kanton Glarus in der Revolution vom Jahr 1798. In: Jahrbuch des Historischen Vereins des Kantons Glarus. 3/1867, S. 67–96 (e-periodica.ch).
- Joachim Heer: Der Kanton Glarus unter der Helvetik. In: Jahrbuch des Historischen Vereins des Kantons Glarus. 5/1869, S. 34–88 (2. Zeitraum: 1. Januar bis 20. Mai 1799, e-periodica.ch); 6/1870, S. 13–67 (3. Zeitraum: 20. Mai bis Herbst 1799, e-periodica.ch), hier S. 34–36, 61 f.; 8/1872, S. 28–112 (3. Zeitraum: Herbst 1799 bis August 1802, e-periodica.ch), hier S. 26, 30, 33.
- William Wickham (Hrsg.): The Correspondence of the Right Honourable William Wickham from the Year 1794. Band 2, Richard Bentley, London 1870, S. 258 f., 284 f., 340 (Digital link).
- The Countess of Minto: Life and Letters of Sir Gilbert Elliot First Earl of Minto [...] edited by his Great-niece. Band 3, Longmans, Green, and Co., London 1874, S. 107 (Digital link).
- Heinrich von Sybel: Geschichte der Revolutionszeit von 1789 bis 1800. 5. Band, Ebner & Seubert, Stuttgart 1879, S. 484 (Digital link).
- David Hess: Die Tage des Schreckens. In: Jakob Baechtold (Hrsg.): Joh. Caspar Schweizer. Ein Charakterbild aus dem Zeitalter der französischen Revolution. Wilhelm Hertz, Berlin 1884, S. XLIV–LXIII (Battle of Glarus (1799) at the Internet Archive).
- Wilhelm Meyer: Die Schlacht bei Zürich am 25. und 26. September 1799. F. Schultheß, Zürich 1886, S. 4–23 (e-rara.ch).
- Eduard Haug (Hrsg.): Der Briefwechsel der Brüder J. Georg Müller und Joh. v. Müller. 1. Halbband, J. Huber, Frauenfeld 1891, S. 200, 209 (Digital link).
- Otto Hartmann: Der Antheil der Russen am Feldzug von 1799 in der Schweiz. Ein Beitrag zur Geschichte dieses Feldzugs und zur Kritik seiner Geschichtschreiber. A. Munk, Zürich 1892, S. 150 ff. (Digital link); Rezension: Revue critique d'histoire et de littérature. Paris, 23. April 1894, S. 338 f.(Digital link).
- Rudolf Reding-Biberegg: Der Zug Suworoff's durch die Schweiz, 24. Herbst- bis 10. Weinmonat 1799 (= Der Geschichtsfreund. Mitteilungen des historischen Vereins der fünf Orte Luzern, Ury, Schwyz, Unterwalden und Zug. 50. Band). Hans von Matt, Stans 1895, S. 49, 124–127 (e-periodica.ch).
- Johannes Strickler (Hrsg.): Actensammlung aus der Zeit der Helvetischen Republik|Amtliche Sammlung der Acten aus der Zeit der Helvetischen Republik (1798–1803) [...] Herausgegeben auf Anordnung der Bundesbehörden. 5. Band, Stämpfli & Cie., Bern 1895, S. 68–71 (Digital link).
- Reinhold Günther: Der Feldzug der Division Lecourbe im Schweizerischen Hochgebirge 1799. J. Huber, Frauenfeld 1896, S. 172–175 (Digital link).
- Hermann Hüffer (Hrsg.): Quellen zur Geschichte der Kriege von 1799 und 1800. Aus den Sammlungen des k. und k. Kriegsarchivs, des Haus-, Hof- und Staatsarchivs und des Archivs des Erzherzogs Albrecht in Wien. 1. Band, B. G. Teubner, Leipzig 1900, S. 45–48 (Weyrother), 63 (Auffenberg), 69 (Venanzone), 78, 92–94 (Wickham, Gilbert Elliot-Murray-Kynynmound, 1. Earl of Minto), 143–146 (Kościuszko), 394, 397, 402 f., 406 f., 412 f., 416 (Battle of Glarus (1799) at the Internet Archive).
- Albert Maag: Die Schicksale der Schweizerregimenter in Napoleons I. Feldzug nach Russland 1812. Mit Benützung des Bundesarchivs. 3. Auflage. Ernst Kuhn, Biel 1900 (Battle of Glarus (1799) at the Internet Archive).
- Carl Bleibtreu: Marschall Soult, Napoleons grösster Schüler. Alfred Schall, Berlin 1902, S. 21, 182.
- Édouard Gachot: Histoire militaire de Masséna. La campagne d'Helvétie (1799). Perrin & Cie, Paris 1904, S. 389–409 (Digital link).
- Gaston Bodart (Hrsg.): Militär-historisches Kriegs-Lexikon (1618–1905). C. W. Stern, Wien/Leipzig 1908, S. 344 (Battle of Glarus (1799) at the Internet Archive).
- Arthur Chuquet (Hrsg.): Un portrait inédit de Souvorov. In: Feuilles d'Histoire du XVIIe au XXe siècle. 1. Jahrgang, 1. Band, Paris 1909, S. 258–260 (Digital link).
- Louis Hennequin: Zürich. Masséna en Suisse. Messidor an VII–Brumaire an VIII (Juillet–Octobre 1799). Publié sous la direction de la Section historique de l'État-major de l'armée. Librairie militaire Berger-Levrault, Paris/Nancy 1911, S. 371–379, 531–533 (gallica.bnf.fr).
- Albert Maag, Markus Feldmann: Die 2. helvetische Halbbrigade im Kampf um den Linthübergang bei Näfels. (1. Oktober 1799.) Aus dem noch unveröffentlichten Werke «Der Schweizer Soldat in der Kriegsgeschichte». In: Der «Schweizer Soldat». 3. Jahrgang, Nr. 4, 16. Februar 1928, S. 20–22 (e-periodica.ch).
- Fernando Bernoulli: Die helvetischen Halbbrigaden im Dienste Frankreichs 1798–1805. Diss. phil. I, Universität Bern. Huber & Co., Frauenfeld 1934, S. 74–77 inkl. Planskizze.
- Frieda Gallati: Glarus im Herbst 1799. In: Jahrbuch des Historischen Vereins des Kantons Glarus. 58/1958, S. 45–62, hier S. 54–57 (e-periodica.ch).
- Felicitas Allart-von Nostitz: Der Westfeldzug Suvorovs in der öffentlichen Meinung Englands. (= Veröffentlichungen des Osteuropa-Institutes München. Reihe Geschichte. Band 45). Otto Harrassowitz, Wiesbaden 1976, ISBN 3-447-01701-5 (Digitalisat), S. 69–71.
- Peter Hoffmann: Alexander Suworow. Der unbesiegte Feldherr. Militärverlag der Deutschen Demokratischen Republik, Berlin 1986, ISBN 3-327-00026-3, S. 199.
- Anton Pestalozzi: Briefe an Lord Sheffield. Englische Kriegsberichte aus der Schweiz, Herbst 1799 (= Neujahrsblatt [...] zum Besten der Waisenhäuser. 152. Stück). Beer AG, Zürich 1989, S. 96 f.
- German Studer-Freuler: Chronik der Familie des Balthasar Joseph Tschudi von Ennenda und seiner Frau Maria Magdalena Stählin von Netstal, begonnen am 20. Christmonat 1790, beendet nach 1802. In: Jahrbuch des Historischen Vereins des Kantons Glarus. 76/1996, S. 11–146, hier S. 112 f. (e-periodica.ch).
- Torsten Verhülsdonk, Carl Schulze: Napoleonische Kriege. Einheiten – Uniformen – Ausrüstung. VS-Books, Herne 1996, ISBN 3-932077-00-8, S. 68 f.
- Holger Böning: Der Traum von Freiheit und Gleichheit. Helvetische Revolution und Republik (1798–1803) – Die Schweiz auf dem Weg zur bürgerlichen Demokratie. Orell Füssli, Zürich 1998, ISBN 3-280-02808-6.
- Christopher Duffy: Eagles over the Alps. Suvorov in Italy and Switzerland, 1799. The Emperor's Press, Chicago 1999, ISBN 1-883476-18-6, S. 212 f., 256–260, 262–264.
- Nicole Gotteri: La campagne de Suisse en 1799. «Le choc des géants.» Bernard Giovangeli, Paris 2003, ISBN 2-909034-35-6, S. 160–162.
- Alexander Mikaberidze: «The Lion of the Russian Army:» Life and Military Career of General Prince Peter Bagration 1765–1812. Diss. phil., Florida State University, 2003 (yumpu.com), S. 159–165.
- Beat Glaus: Der Kanton Linth der Helvetik. Historischer Verein des Kantons Schwyz, Schwyz 2005, ISBN 3-033-00438-5.
- Zürich 1799. Eine Stadt erlebt den Krieg. (= Stadtgeschichte und Städtebau in Zürich 7.) Stadt Zürich, 2005, ISBN 3-905384-08-6 (Digitalisat).
- Steven T. Ross: The A to Z of the Wars of the French Revolution. Scarecrow Press, Lanham, Maryland 2010, ISBN 978-1-4616-7238-8, S. 20, 36 (Digital link).
- Boris Bouget: Un débat méconnu au XVIIIe siècle, l'armement des officiers et des bas-officiers d'infanterie. In: Guy Saupin, Éric Schnakenbourg (Hrsg.): Expériences de la guerre, pratiques de la paix. Hommages à Jean-Pierre Bois. Presses universitaires de Rennes 2013, S. 81–96 (books.openedition.org).
- Werner Ort: Heinrich Zschokke (1771–1848). Eine Biografie. Hier + jetzt, Baden 2013, ISBN 978-3-03919-273-1.
- Jürg Stüssi-Lauterburg, Elena M. Tarkhanowa et al. (Hrsg.): Mit Suworow in der Schweiz. Das Tagebuch des Hauptmanns Nikolaj A. Grjazew vom russischen Alpenfeldzug des Jahre 1799 [...]. Merker im Effingerhof, Lenzburg 2013, ISBN 978-3-85648-146-9, S. 162–169 (überarbeitete Aufzeichnungen eines Beteiligten, russisch/deutsch)
- Jürg Stüssi-Lauterburg: Soult gegen Suworow 1799. 205. Neujahrsblatt der Feuerwerker-Gesellschaft (Artillerie-Kollegium) in Zürich auf das Jahr 2014. Beer, Zürich 2013, S. 54 f., 57.
- Andreas Bräm: Glarus Nord (= Die Kunstdenkmäler des Kantons Glarus. Band 2). Gesellschaft für Schweizerische Kunstgeschichte GSK, Bern 2017 (gsk.ch, PDF), S. 153, 165 f.
- Fred Heer: Ungebetene Gäste. Das Glarnerland als Kriegsschauplatz oder: Wie der Krieg in unser Land kam. In: Ungebetene Gäste – das Kriegsjahr 1799. (= Jahrbuch 97. Historischer Verein Kanton Glarus 2017). Küng Druck AG, Näfels 2017, ISBN 978-3-85546-328-2, S. 128–185, hier S. 155–158 (e-periodica.ch).
- Alexander Statiev: The Alpine Campaign of 1799 as a Stepping Stone to a Doctrine of Mountain Warfare. In: Tallinn University Press (Hrsg.): Estonian Yearbook of Military History. 9 (15) 2019, ISSN 2228-0669, S. 29–65, doi:10.22601/SAA.2019.08.02, hier S. 51–54, 64 f. (nicht in Übersetzungen erhältliche russische Literatur).
- Flurin Clalüna, Andrea Spalinger: Die Schweiz, wie sie nie war: Gedankenexperimente zur Geschichte des Landes. In: Neue Zürcher Zeitung. 29. Juli 2023.
- Suvorov, Alexander Vasilyevich (2023) [1806]. Наука побеждать [The Science of Victory]. Эксклюзивная классика (revised ed.). Moscow: AST. ISBN 978-5-17-157345-4.
