= Combats of Schwanden =

War of the Second Coalition combats, 1799

- Part of Suvorov's Swiss campaign in the war of the Second Coalition
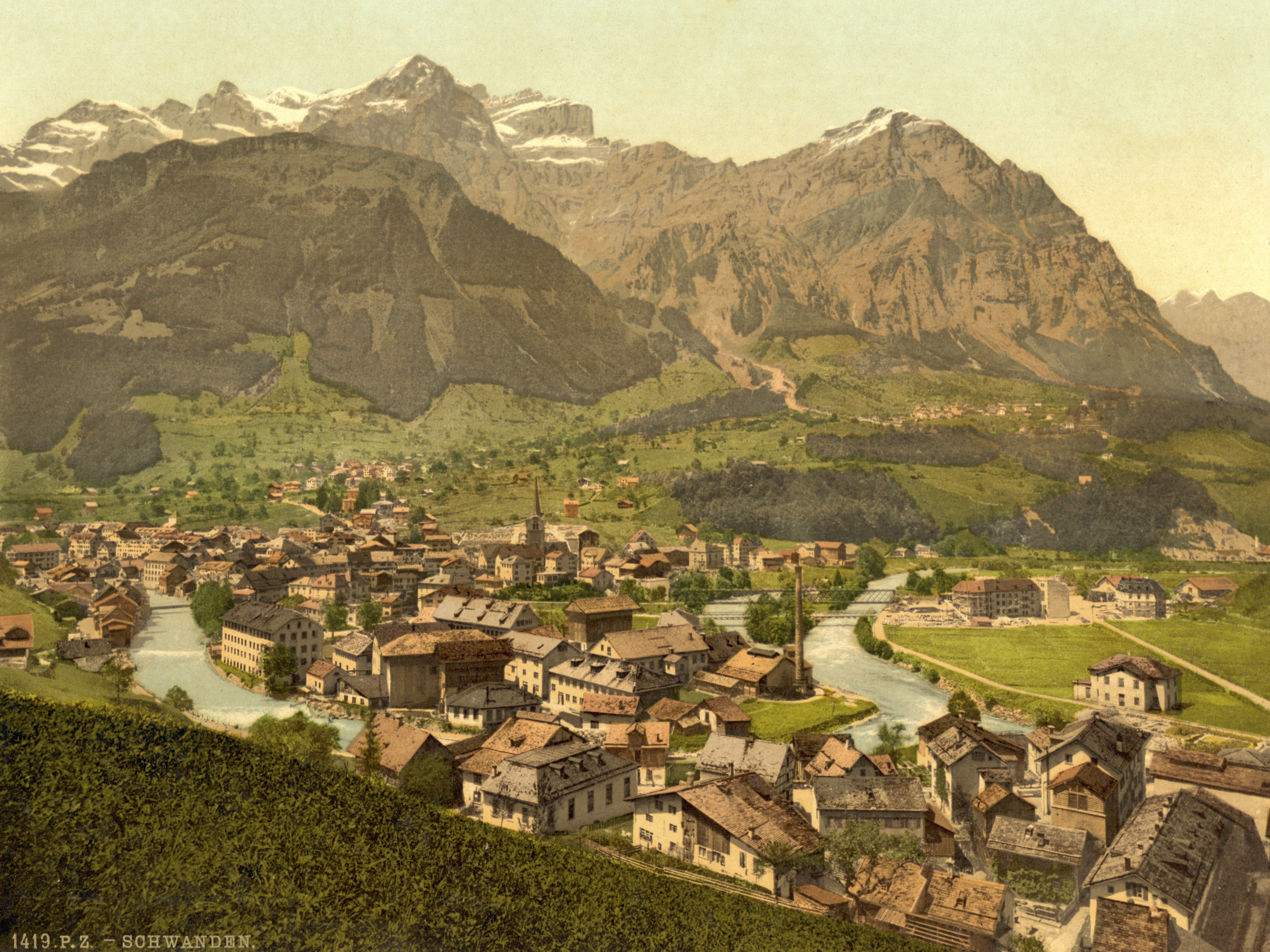
- Schwanden c. 1890–1900
Date	5 October 1799
Location	Schwanden, Canton of Linth, Switzerland
Result	• Russian victory – 1st combat; • French victory – 2nd combat

Belligerents
France	Russia

Commanders and leaders
Honoré Gazan; Gabriel Molitor; André Masséna; Louis Loison	Pyotr Bagration; Giorgio Zuccato

Strength
5,000 (in total)	1,899 men plus 1 regiment

Casualties and losses
Unknown	Unknown

The first combat of Schwanden and the second combat of Schwanden (5 October [O.S. 24 September] 1799) saw a Russian rearguard under the command of Pyotr Bagration, which acted self-determinately and not dependently on the commander-in-chief Suvorov, repelling a French attacks of Gabriel Molitor, who was directed by Honoré Gazan, at Schwanden, with various success, when the French commander-in-chief André Masséna tried to catch up with Suvorov's army. The combats took place during Suvorov's Swiss campaign.

== Action development ==
After their victory at the Muttental, Andrei Rosenberg's troops set out to join the others and arrived on 4 October. Suvorov had only one free way out of Masséna's encirclement, namely up the Sernftal through Engi, Elm and the snowy Ringen-Kopf (Panix) mountain to Ilanz. After giving a necessary orders, Suvorov took action. The troops set out on the night of 4–5 September. Mikhail Miloradovich was in the vanguard, followed by the packs, then the rest of Andrei Rosenberg's troops, and finally Wilhelm Derfelden; Bagration was in the rearguard. Franz von Auffenberg was no longer there; he had set out two days earlier.

=== First combat ===
In the morning, having learned of the Russian retreat, the French immediately set out after them. While the pack train was still being drawn into the gorge, the French launched an attack, severely mauled Sychov Cossacks, and drove them back onto the infantry. Bagration stopped in front of Schwanden and formed a battle line, covering both flanks, since the right was threatened by a French outflanking column, detached in advance. In the center were all four grenadier battalions, on the left on mountain slopes was Miller jaeger regiment under the command of Giorgio Zuccato, on the right were Bagration jaegers on the Linth's right side against Gazan's French battalion of the 44th demi-brigade. Molitor had three his own battalions from the 84th demi-brigade and Édouard Mortier's 3 companies of grenadiers from the 108th who had descended from the Pragel Pass and united with Molitor.

French artillery opened fire; the Russians had no cannons, and they met the French with rifle fire, and then used bayonets all the time. "The unequal battle lasted for several hours;" The French corps, having a total of 5,000 men, assaulted, increasing the frequency of attacks; the Russian rearguard, which did not have 2,000 men in its ranks initially, repelled. Bagration jaegers crossed a ford and swam across the river, occupied the village of Sool on a hill and stopped the outflanking movement. At Bagration's request, Veletsky regiment arrived from the tail, the rearguard went on the offensive, threw back the French towards Mitlödi, took advantage of their confusion, retreated behind Schwanden and took up a new position behind Schwanden on the Linth's right. This action allowed the main column and the entire convoy to pass through the gorge and continue their retreat calmly to Elm, 21.3 kilometres (13.2 mi) from Glarus.

=== Second combat ===
At this time, the French also received reinforcements: the vanguard of a detachment of Louis Loison sent by Masséna from the Schächental through Klausen Pass to help Molitor arrived (the 2nd Battalion of the 38th). In total, including uninvolved troops, Loison had 20 companies of the 76th and 38th. The Russians, according to the French, fought as desperate men, all efforts were broken by Suvorovites. The Russians had to save their last bullets. Trained and educated by Suvorov only to attack, advance, and strike, Bagration's battalions did not limit themselves to holding back the French, went on the attack, boldly threw themselves into French bayonets, and forced the French to retreat. The number of jaegers broke through too far, they were cut off from the rear. Some managed to clear a path with bayonets, others were either captured or thrown back to the river and into the fast flow. After this, Bagration held out for more than 2 hours at Engi. The Russians received a resupply of ammunition during the snowfall, and 200 of their rangers were engaged in hill Matt churchyard, which jutted out into the valley from the east like a ready-made redoubt; from here the Russians could control the entire valley with fire. The French brought in artillery, and at eight o'clock in the evening their infantry stormed the slope, climbed over the wall and entered the church to deal with the sick and wounded Russians lying at the altar's foot. Having withstood in this way in three positions, Bagration was finally forced to retreat in the evening under pressure from Molitor, behind the village of Matt. Bagration provided his advanced troops to Zuccato and other subordinates. Here the French stopped pursuing, but harassed the Russians all night, so that some of the battalions' men remained constantly under arms, the battalions rested in shifts. The simple setback almost turned into something more serious, but Bagration's command was able to unite with Suvorov. After midnight on the 6th (25th O.S.), the Russians set off on their path, which, thanks to the deep snow that had fallen, turned out to be more difficult than all the previous ones.

Thus, Bagration, having won tactical and strategic victories in the first battle, was tactically defeated in the second.

== Sources ==
=== Bibliography ===
- Duffy, Christopher (1999). Eagles Over the Alps: Suvorov in Italy and Switzerland, 1799. Chicago, Illinois: The Emperor's Press. pp. 245–248. ISBN 978-1883476182.
- Milyutin, Dmitry (1853). История войны России с Францией в царствование Императора Павла I в 1799 году [The history of Russia's war with France during the reign of Emperor Paul I in 1799] (in Russian). Vol. 4. Saint Petersburg: Типография штаба военно-учебных заведений. pp. 153–159.
- Petrushevsky, Alexander (1884). "Швейцарская кампания: Муттенталь, Кленталь, Рингенкопф; 1799" [Swiss Campaign: Muttental, Klöntal, Ringenkopf]. Генералиссимус князь Суворов [Generalissimo Prince Suvorov] (in Russian). Vol. 3 (1st ed.). Saint Petersburg: Типография М. М. Стасюлевича. pp. 276–277.
