= Gabriel Jean Joseph Molitor =

Marshal of France (1770–1849)

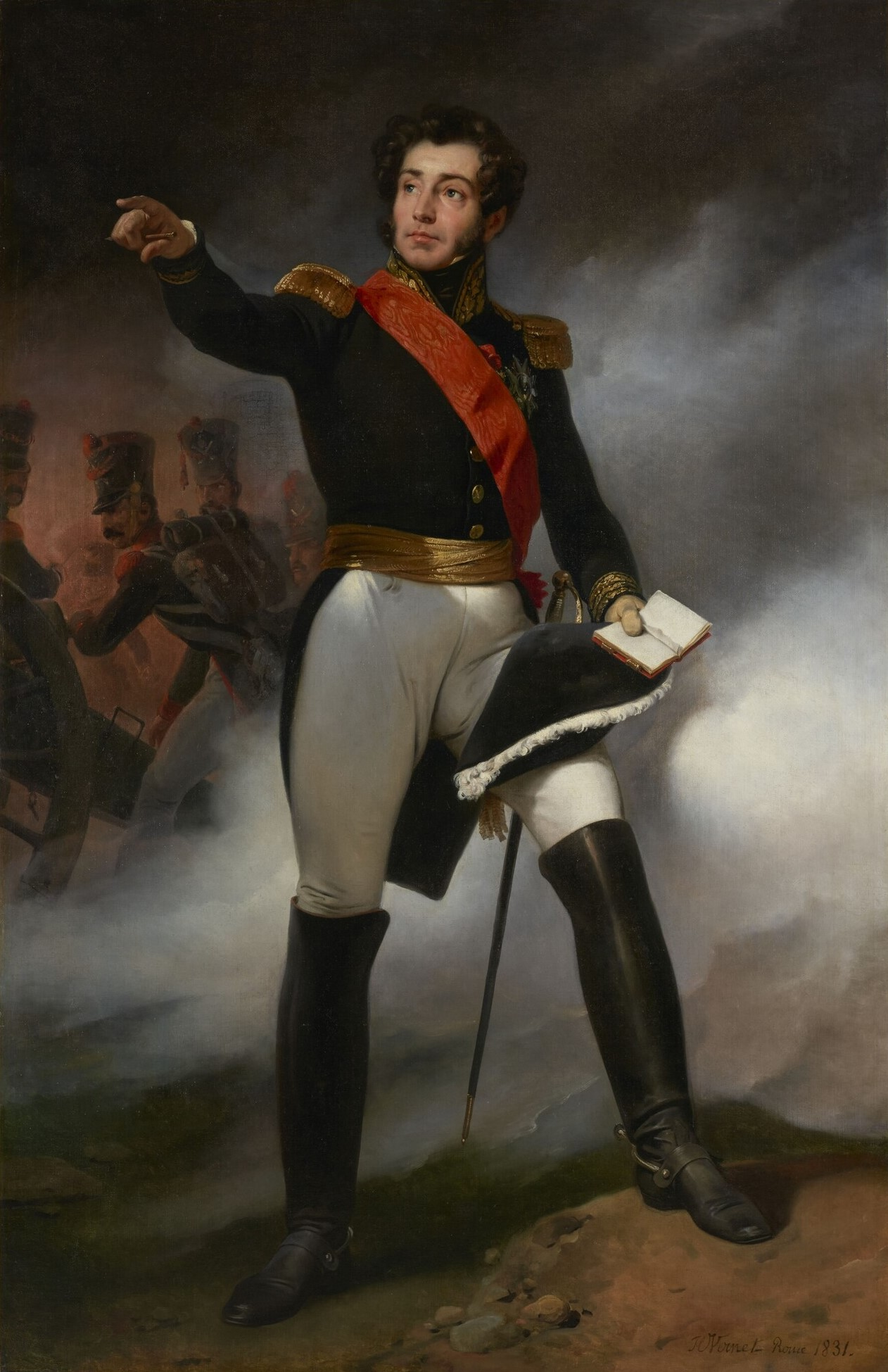
- Portrait by Horace Vernet, 1831
- Born: 7 March 1770; Hayingen, France
- Died: 28 July 1849 (aged 79); Paris, France
- Military career
- Allegiance: Kingdom of France; French First Republic; First French Empire; Kingdom of France (Restoration)
- Branch: Infantry
- Service years: 1789–1827
- Rank: Marshal of France
- Conflicts: Great French War; • Battle of Linth River; • Battle of Klöntal; • Battle of Glarus (1799); • Combats of Schwanden; • Siege of Ragusa (1806); "Hundred Thousand Sons of Saint Louis"; • Siege of Pamplona (1823)
- Awards: Count of the Empire
- Other work: Governor of Les Invalides (1847–1848)

Gabriel-Jean-Joseph Molitor (English: /mɒlɪˈtɔːr/ mo-li-TOR, French: [ɡabʁijɛl ʒɑ̃ ʒozɛf mɔlitoʁ]; 7 March 1770 – 28 July 1849) was a Marshal of France (1823), known for his experience during the Coalition Wars.

Molitor defeated Franjo Jelačić during the encounter at Mollis in 1799. Together with Honoré Gazan, he then managed to stop Alexander Suvorov's vanguard, commanded by Pyotr Bagration, at the combat of Näfels as part of the larger Battle of Glarus (1799). He also forced Dmitry Senyavin to lift the siege of Ragusa (1806). In the course of the "Hundred Thousand Sons of Saint Louis", the French Royal intervention in the Spanish Royalist War, he commanded the initial siege of Pamplona (1823), ultimately successful.

== Biography ==
He was born in Hayingen in Lorraine. Upon the outbreak of the French Revolution, Molitor joined the French revolutionary armies as a captain in a battalion of militia. In 1793 he was given command of a brigade and served under Hoche under whom he fought at Kaiserslautern and Wissembourg. In 1795, Molitor was severely wounded in the Battle of Mainz. In 1799, Molitor was sent to Switzerland where he fought under André Masséna against an Austro-Russian force led by Alexander Suvorov, particularly at the Klöntal, Näfels, and Schwanden. In 1800, he fought in the Army of the Rhine under Moreau.

Molitor was promoted to the rank of général de division in 1801. He was sent with Massena to Italy in 1805, where he served at Vago and Caldiero. In 1806 he took part in the relief of Republic of Ragusa. In 1807, Molitor was transferred to the German theatre of operations, where he served against the Swedes around Stralsund. He was then made governor of Pommern and was granted a comital title by Napoleon. In 1809 he was given command of a division in Massena's IV Corps and he saw action in the battles of Aspern and Wagram. In 1810 he was sent to occupy the cities of the Hanseatic League, from 1811 to 1813 he served in Holland, in the campaign of 1814 he served under MacDonald.

After the abdication of Napoleon, Molitor made his submission to the Bourbons who made him Inspector-General of the infantry. Upon the return of the emperor from Elba, Molitor joined him during the Hundred Days, for which he was stripped of his functions after Napoleon's defeat. In 1818, Molitor was restored to grace.

In 1823 he commanded the II Corps which was sent to Spain as part of the Hundred Thousand Sons of Saint Louis taking part in the initial stages of the Siege of Pamplona. The same year he was made a Marshal of France as well as a Peer. From 1827, he served as secretary to the Chamber of Peers. After the July Revolution, Molitor was allowed to keep all his functions and he later served as Governor of Les Invalides and as Grand Chancellor of the Legion d'Honneur. He died in 1849 in Paris. A statue of Molitor was later erected in Nancy.

== Stradivarius ==
The 1697 Molitor Stradivarius, rumored to have once been owned by Napoleon Bonaparte, belonged to Molitor beginning in 1804. It was sold by Tarisio Auctions in October 2010 for a world record $3.6M.

== See also ==
- Porte Molitor

== Bibliography ==
- Clausewitz, Carl von (2021). The Coalition Crumbles, Napoleon Returns: The 1799 Campaign in Italy and Switzerland, Volume 2. Trans and ed. Nicholas Murray and Christopher Pringle. Lawrence, Kansas: University Press of Kansas. ISBN 978-0-7006-3034-9
- Gilman, D. C.; Peck, H. T.; Colby, F. M., eds. (1905). "Molitor, Gabriel Jean Joseph, Count" . New International Encyclopedia (1st ed.). New York: Dodd, Mead.
