= Battle of Klöntal =

War of the Second Coalition battle, 1799

Battle of the Klöntal
- Part of Suvorov's Swiss campaign in the war of the Second Coalition
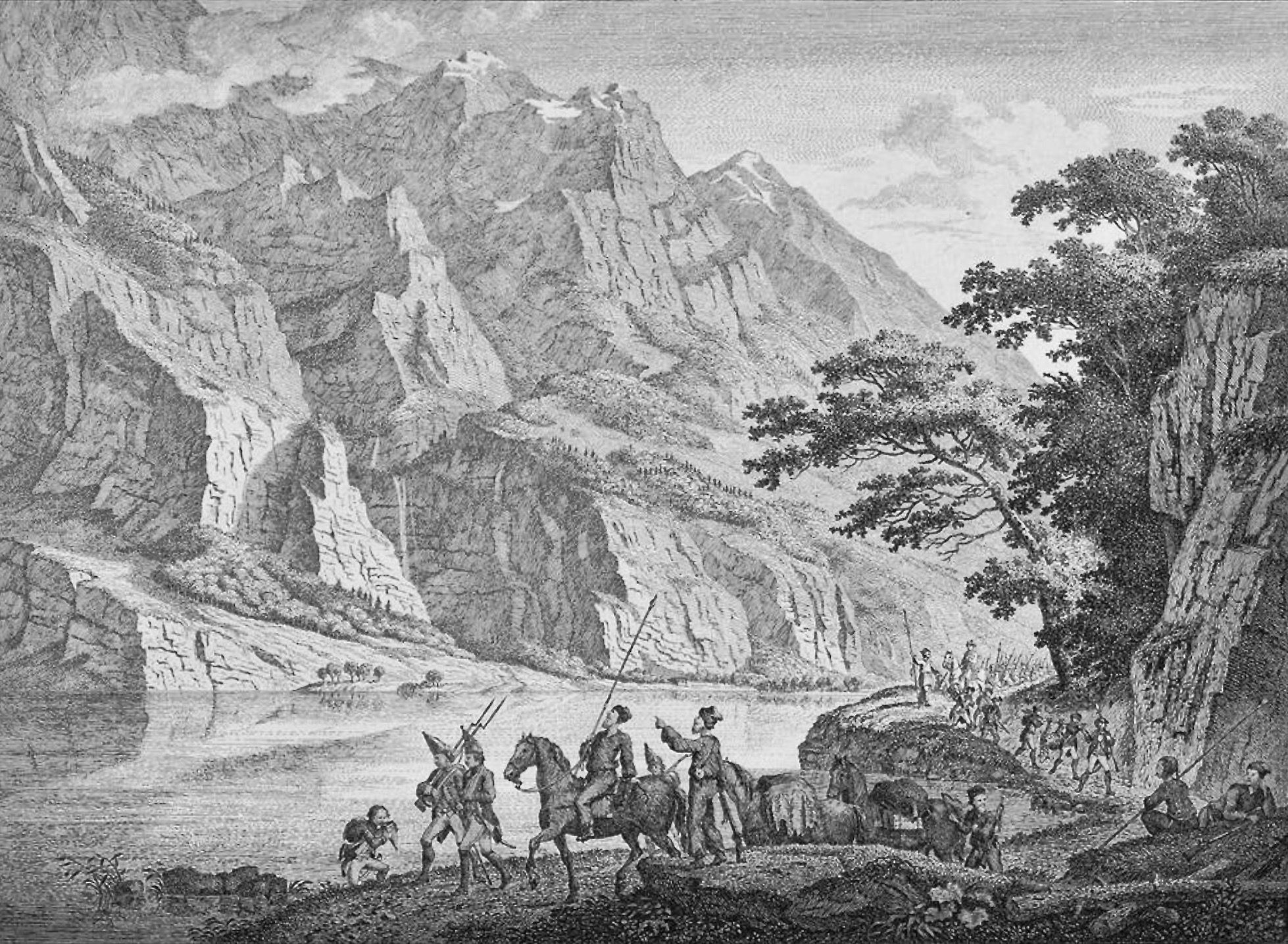
- The Cossacks and Russian regulars over Klöntalersee. Engraved by Ludwig Hess (1799)
Date	30 Sep. to 1 Oct. 1799 (O.S. 19 to 20 Sep. 1799)
Location	at Klöntalersee, Canton of Linth, Helvetic Republic
Result	Coalition victory

Belligerents
Russia; Habsburg monarchy	France

Commanders and leaders
(Russian Empire) Alexander Suvorov (Russian Empire) Pyotr Bagration (WIA) (Russian Empire) Yakov Povalo-Shveikovsky (Russian Empire) Giorgio Zuccato (Russian Empire) Wilhelm Derfelden (Habsburg monarchy) Franz von Auffenberg	(French First Republic) Gabriel Molitor (French First Republic) André Masséna

Strength
~2,100 [in action?] (Note: Comparing the forces brought into the battle on 1 October by Molitor and Bagration, it appears (on the 12 October reports' basis) that Molitor on the evening of the day (respectively, also in the combat of Näfels), not counting artillery and cavalry, but taking into account only 8 battalions standing in the Linth Valley, had a considerable numerical superiority over Bagration's vanguard and Auffenberg's brigade. Bagration's advanced troops of Suvorov (overall): Bagration jaeger regiment — 400 men; Miller jaeger regiment — 370; Lomonosov combined grenadier battalion — 170; Dendrygin combined grenadier battalion — 275; Sanaev combined grenadier battalion — 245; Kalemin combined grenadier battalion — 300; in total — 1,760 (up to 3,000 inclusive of 1 Cossack regiment, as per Milyutin); Auffenberg's brigade — 2,400 (2,000, as per Milyutin); altogether — 4,160 as per Reding-Biberegg.; Povalo-Shveikovsky's division — 3,000; n.b.: The Cossacks' formations did not fight and Austrian brigade was not fully involved.)	~3,800 available for action (Note: French troops of Molitor (took part on 30 Sep – 1 Oct): 3 battalions of the 84th Demi-Brigade — 1,844 men; 3 battalions of the 44th Demi-Brigade — 2,003; The 3rd Battalion of the 36th Demi-Brigade — c. 750 (2,246/3); The 1st Battalion of the 25th Demi-Brigade — c. 900 (273 1/3); in total — 5,497 (as per Reding-Biberegg).; n.b.: The 2nd Battalion of the 44th Demi-Brigade, standing at Weesen, and the 3rd Battalion of the 36th Demi-Brigade, standing at Beglingen, — arrived at Molitor only in the evening, and, on the other hand, the vanguard of Auffenberg and Bagration, in all probability, received reinforcements from Shveikovsky's division (with a total of 4,000). In round numbers, if subtract the approximate strength of the 2nd Battalion and the strength of the 3rd, it will be approx. 3,947, or less by c. 200; arithmetic mean 3,847.) (up to 6,500 [in total?])

Casualties and losses
Unknown	1,000 killed or wounded, 1,000 captured (Note: Molitor's loss on 30 September and 1 October extended (as per information extracted from the 'Atlas of the campaign of the Russian troops of 1799 in Switzerland', compiled by officers of the Russian General Staff under ru:Fyodor Gerhard), to 1,000 killed and 365 captured. The loss of Allied troops was "much less", as Bogdanovich says. Among the wounded were the major generals: Bagration and Gorchakov 2nd.)

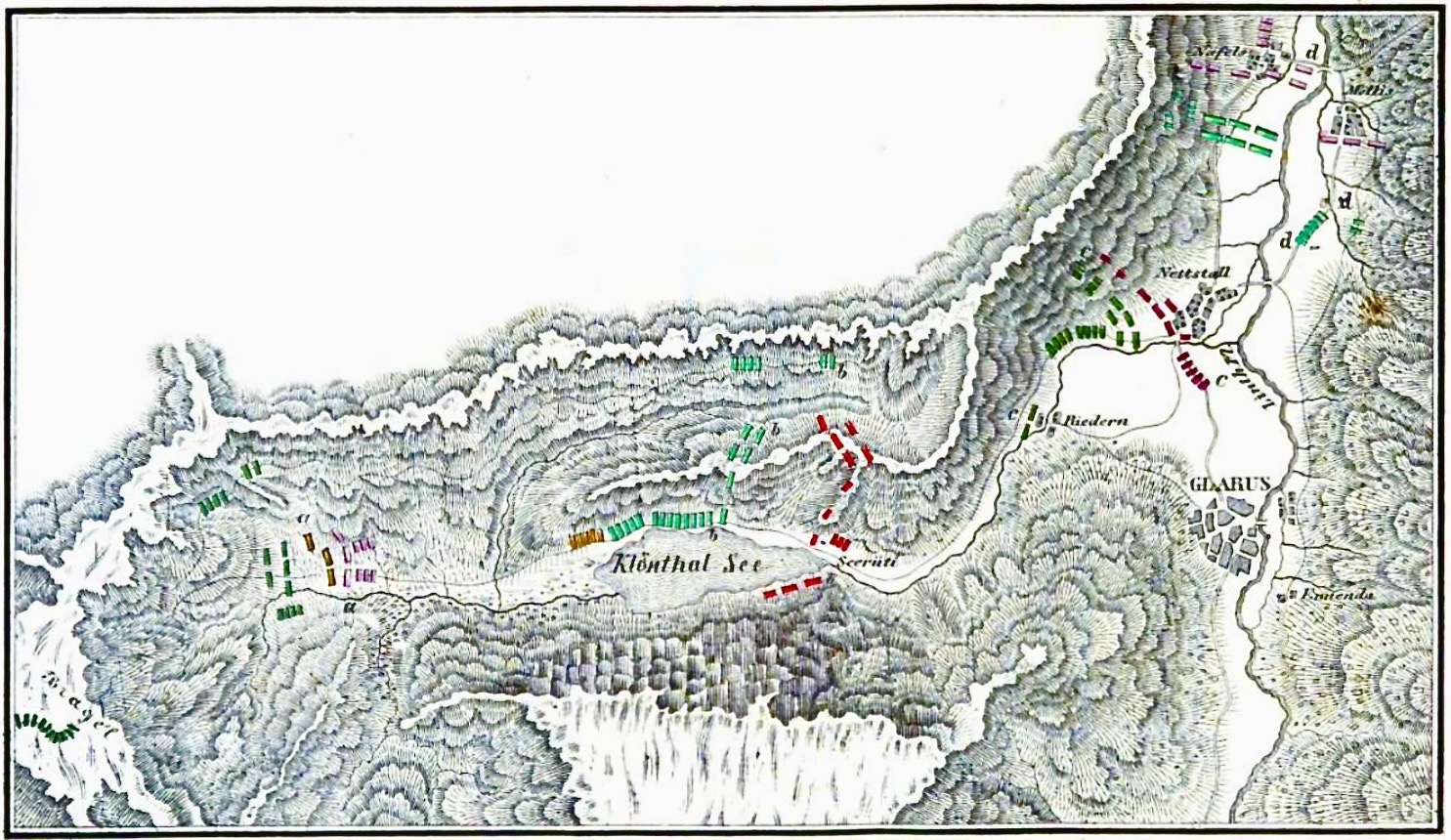
Fights for the Klöntal and near Näfels. By Dmitry Milyutin

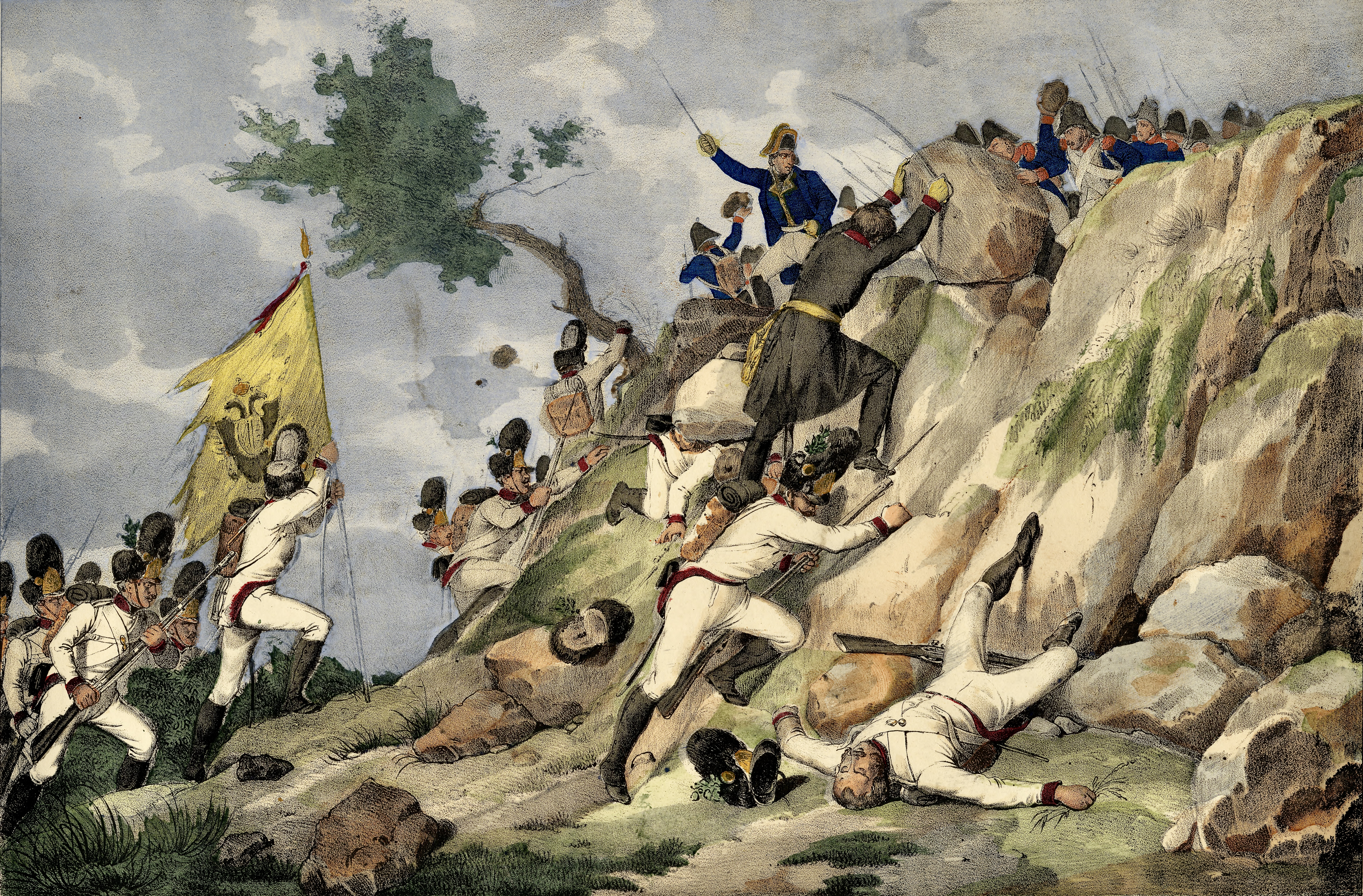
Battle of the Klöntal. The Austrians of Auffenberg

The battle of (the) Klöntal or Claenthal was fought near Lake Klöntal (in the namesake valley) (Note: Klön Valley directly from German) on 30 September – 1 October 1799 during the Revolutionary Wars (Second Coalition, Suvorov's Swiss campaign).

Suvorov came up with 'Napoleonic plans' (Note: This expression means far-reaching plans.) to get out of the difficult strategic situation in which he found himself. Suvorov's operational goal was to reach Glarus through the Klöntal. His Russians and Austrians under Bagration's tactical control, numbering plus or minus 2,100, were pressing against the French frontline troops in rounded numbers 3,800 men, or up to 6,500 in all, under Molitor. Masséna sought to completely surround Suvorov's forces, and as a result, he reinforced Molitor in the process to block Suvorov's escape. The number of Frenchmen who participated in this battle before Masséna's reinforcements arrived is unknown. The battle ended in an Allied victory. In total, the Allies had greater than or equal to 4,160 men, but it was not only those who participated; also, it is not specified that the given French numbers were all involved. One way or another, Suvorov managed to concentrate enough forces in the Klöntal to displace the French troops present there.

Suvorov stopped his advance following the "Glarus" battle (1 October), where the future French Marshal Soult would manage to stop Bagration and his reinforcements, but only around Näfels, which was not Suvorov's operational objective at the time. The capture of Glarus proved to be the limit of Suvorov's availability, and he preferred not to try to advance further.

== Background ==
Having descended into Mutten valley and waiting for the rest of the troops to arrive, Suvorov sent a hundred mounted Cossacks on the morning of the 28th to the right, toward the side of Glarus, to gather some information about Friedrich von Linken. The Cossacks returned with bad news: there was no rumor about Linken, and the Klöntal was occupied by the French. It was no longer a vague rumor, like the one carried in Altdorf: Korsakov and Hotze are smashed and far thrown back, Jellacic (Jelačić) retreated, a strong French corps occupied Glarus, and Masséna pulls together troops to Schwyz.

=== French triumphs ===
The disaster occurred on September 25–26; Korsakov arranged his troops in the worst possible way and not only did not take measures against his enemy's attack, — he was "asking for defeat". Masséna, on the contrary, prepared for battle with prudence, with skill and in deep secrecy; with the same skill and restraint, he made an attack. According to a comment of the 1799 war's historian, Dmitry Milyutin, Masséna's attack on the Limmat had, in its general course, very much in common with Suvorov's passage through the Adda, but at the same time Korsakov did not resemble Moreau at all. The Russians were caught unawares; from complacency, arrogance and carelessness, their leader went to the "other extreme" and completely lost his head. The disorder was incredible, bordering on complete chaos. The right flank, under the command of General Durasov, remained idle during this affair, deceived by the French demonstrations; it wandered at random and only by chance escaped annihilation. The detachment of 5,000 men to assist Hotze, per the general plan of action, was executed only on the attack's eve of Masséna and contributed to the disorder increase; however, it is very doubtful that these troops's presence could change the affair's outcome, — due to the complete actions' fragmentation and the lack of general orders. If to all this add a preponderance of forces on the French side, it becomes clear why Rimsky-Korsakov was subjected to a complete defeat at Zurich and his corps suffered terrible losses. The number of killed, wounded, and prisoners extended to 8,000, including many officers and 3 generals; banners lost 9, guns 26, and the wagon train nearly all.

The outcome could have been even more ruinous if the Russian troops by their selfless bravery and fortitude had not partially compensated for the high command's shortcomings. Masséna himself did them justice in this respect. The Russian troops retreated to the Rhine's right side and encamped near Schaffhausen, destroying bridges behind them. The French pursued them only at first: Masséna was concerned about Suvorov's movement.

Simultaneously with the battle of Zurich, the battle of the Linth was also taking place. At the very beginning, Hotze and his chief of staff were killed; the Austrian troops suffered a complete defeat, losing nearly half of their men killed, wounded and captured. They retreated through St. Gallen to Rheineck and there crossed toward the Rhine's right side, destroying the bridges behind. The victorious French general Soult pursued them very feebly; his attention was also turned to the Linth and the Reuss' upper reaches.

Other separate Austrian detachments, although they avoided the Korsakov and Hotze's deplorable fate, but also completely abandoned Suvorov, Jellacic and Linken, fulfilling the campaign's general plan, moved forward; the first of them, meeting stubborn resistance and then hearing about the disaster at Linth, fell into such a panic that he retreated across the Rhine to Maienfeld. Linken did even worse; being together with Jellacic stronger than the French general Molitor, against whom they both acted, he did not help Jellacic, acted slowly, and only increased by this the French courage and determination. He must have realized how imperative it was for him to move forward and open communication, or at least communication, with Suvorov. In spite of this he, being in the same forces with Molitor, stood against him at Glarus on the 27th and 28th, without making a general attack, and when he learned of the Limmat and Linth events and the retreat of Jellacic, he himself retreated. Meanwhile, on this last day, the 28th, a hundred of Suvorov's Cossacks reached the Klöntal, to open communication with him,—needlessly. Thus Linken without being pursued by anyone withdrew all the way to Ilanz.

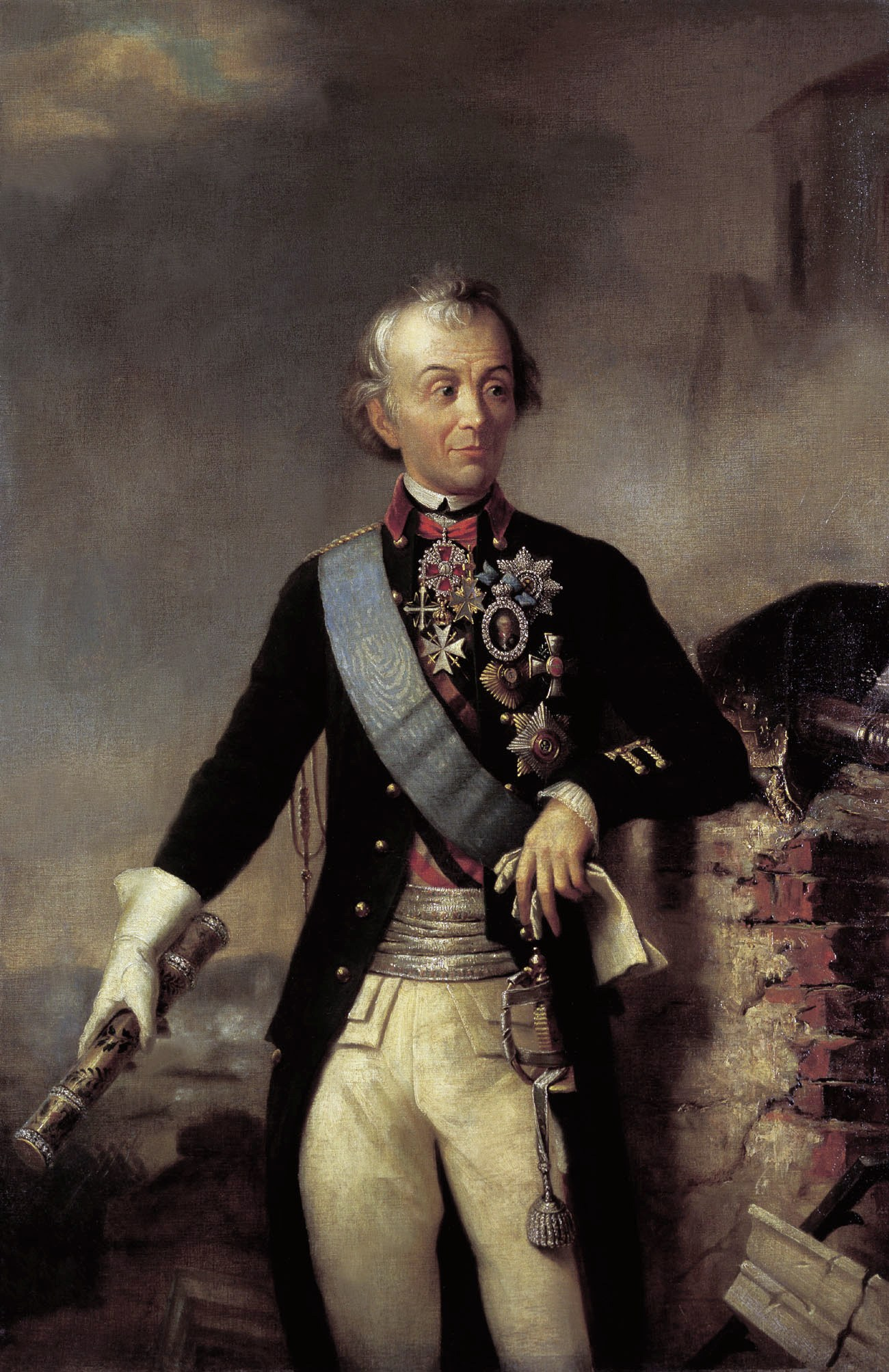
Suvorov with a baton

=== Suvorov's state ===
Alexander Suvorov's situation in the Muottental was desperate. There were no warm clothes, and even the summer clothes looked like shirts, and shoes even worse; there was almost nothing left in people's dry bags; the bundles with provisions were still dragging behind; there were no cannons, except for mountain artillery; charges and cartridges were running out; cavalry horses were dehydrated and emaciated by complete fodderlessness. The feat was so difficult that it required the complete unanimity of everyone, the highest degree of unity between the leader and his subordinates, the rise of moral strength to the last limit. Suvorov ordered a council of war to meet at his house, inviting the Grand Duke and 10 generals; the Austrian General Auffenberg was not summoned. The first to appear at the meeting was Bagration; Suvorov, in full field-marshal's uniform, greatly disturbed and agitated, paced about the room, uttering curt words, the ineptitude of warfare, the art of being beaten, and so on. He paid no attention to Bagration, perhaps even did not notice his arrival at all, so that Bagration thought it more appropriate to go out and appear with the others. Suvorov met them with a bow, closed his eyes, as if gathering his thoughts, and then with fire in his gaze, with an animated face began to speak strongly, vigorously, even solemnly. No one had ever seen him in such a mood. Explaining briefly what happened at the Limmat, at the Linth, and with the rest of the Austrian detachments, Suvorov, not restraining his indignation, recalled all the difficulties in the course of the Italian campaign, which constantly had from Thugut and the Hofkriegsrat.

International historians testify that Suvorov, seeing himself trapped, became so furious that he decided to knock the French out of Schwyz and go to the rear of his enemy's army, and that only the persistent persuasion of several persons kept him from such a desperate intention. Russian sources say the opposite, and one of the campaign participants claimed that Austrian officers of the general staff pointed Suvorov to Schwyz as the best course of action, but he did not agree. It is very probable that Suvorov, on the first impulse, wanted to go to Schwyz.

Suvorov was left against the French in the entire theater of war alone, exhausted, without food, without artillery, and, without any hope for anyone's help. It was not that Suvorov, whom everyone was accustomed to see in battle, on the campaign, in the camp, then formidable, then joking and whimsical, but always looking forward with full confidence in success, and did not allow the thought of failure, much less defeat. Hardly anyone had ever seen tears in his eyes before; no one had ever seen anxiety and excitement on his face in former years, to the extent that. All those present instinctively moved forward to lift Suvorov from the feet of the Grand Duke, but Constantine Pavlovich, himself shaken to the depths of his soul, had already raised the Field Marshal to his feet and, all in tears, embraced him and covered him with kisses. Then all, as if "by prior agreement", glances turned to Wilhelm Derfelden, who enjoyed universal respect for his personal and military qualities in addition to his seniority. Derfelden addressed Suvorov with a heartfelt word, but with brevity, which always brought Suvorov in delight. He said that now everyone knows what has happened, and see what a difficult feat ahead of them, but Suvorov also knows to what extent the troops were devoted to him and with what selflessness he is loved. Therefore, "no matter what troubles ahead, no matter what misfortunes may have fallen, the troops will bear everything, will not shame the Russian name and if they are not to prevail, at least they shall lie down in glory". When Derfelden finished, "all in a voice, with enthusiasm, with passion confirmed his words, swearing by the name of God, and there was no flattery on their tongue, nor deceit in their hearts". Suvorov listened to Derfelden with closed eyes and lowered head; "when there was a heartfelt, fervent cry of those present, he raised the head, looked at everyone with a bright look, thanked and expressed his firm hope that there would be a victory, a double victory,—over the enemy, and over treachery".

Suvorov's disposition of troops instructed Rosenberg's corps to remain in the rearguard and hold their enemy from Schwyz until all the packs had passed over Mount Bragell (now Pragel). Rosenberg was ordered to hold firm, to repel the French with all his strength, but not to pursue them beyond Schwyz. Those who took part in the council of war bowed to Suvorov and went away, carrying in their hearts an unprecedented impression and retaining traces of it in their facial expressions; especially Derfelden and Pyotr Bagration looked angrily and menacingly.

Having ascertained that Suvorov must already be at the Muottental, Masséna ordered some of his troops to concentrate there, and others to reinforce Molitor around Glarus, so as thus to lock up to the Russians these two only exits from the trap into which they had fallen.

== The battle ==
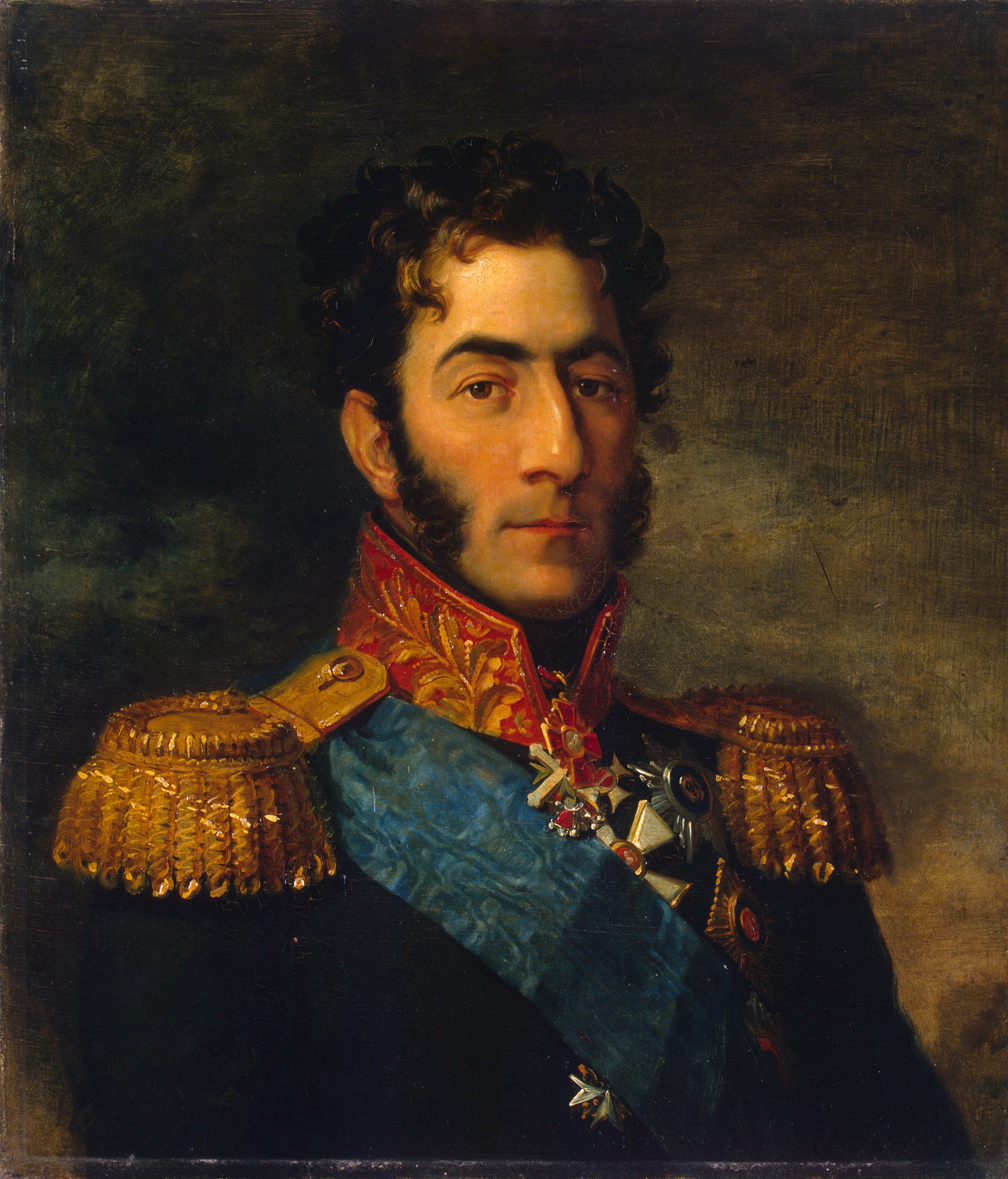
Knyaz Bagration

The troops moved out as Suvorov's disposition had instructed. Auffenberg knocked down the French battalion posts from Mount Bragell, (Note: 2nd Battalion of the 84th Demi-Brigade) descended to the Klöntal and camped for the night before reaching the lake. In the morning Molitor attacked the Austrians when he noticed their detachment was heavily inferior in numbers, (Note: Molitor had 4 battalions on hand.) harassed them, and then made an offer to lay down their arms. Auffenberg entered into negotiations, frightened by the retreat through Bragell and not hoping for quick help from the Russians, but Bagration arrived just in time. The passage through Bragell was easier than through the Rossstock, but the ascent still made the troops very tired, and the Russian column was very much stretched out. Only in the third afternoon hour Bagration descended to the Klöntal, swampy terrain, between the forests, and headed along the road that skirted Lake Klöntal, or Klöntalersee, from the north side. Two battalions advanced along the road, two to the left, one regiment kept still to the left, climbing the mountains to outflank the French, and Bagration himself took the right, so as to threaten the French left flank. Auffenberg, notified of Bagration's approach, broke off negotiations; Molitor, firmly convinced that Masséna would not let Suvorov out of the Muottental, pursued the Austrians hotly, considering them his sure prey. Suddenly Bagration appeared on his left flank, stealthily snuck through the swampy forest, and with a shout of hurrah rushed into the bayonets. The French did not expect a new enemy; met by bayonet attack from the front and from the flank, they went back and although they tried to hold on, shooting back, but Bagration did not let them recover, constantly resuming attacks.

Molitor retreated along the narrow road, strengthened by reinforcements coming up from Glarus. A strong position was taken at the eastern end of the lake, along the steep mountains' crest, with the left flank to Klöntalersee; this position, at a distance from the shore to the foothills, was strengthened by the church's stone fence. The Russians advanced along the same narrow road, where only two men could pass side by side; at times the movement was impeded by huge stones and fallen trees. The Austrian battalion, which was at the head, was met by a volley on leaving the gorge, and fell back; the Russian battalion, which had squeezed forward, rushed to the attack, but was also repulsed. Bagration renewed the attack several times, but without success; in front the attacker was showered with a hail of bullets and canister shots, on the right flank there was a fire from behind the opposite bank rocks. Night was descending; the troops, exhausted by the 21-kilometre (13 mi) passage through the mountain heights, through the snowy ridge, were in great need of rest. Bagration postponed the attack until the next day; only the skirmish continued in spite of the night darkness. At night Povalo's division also came up, having lost many packs on the crossing. The rest was not enviable for the Russians in the close neighborhood with the French: it was ordered to stand in complete silence; fires were allowed only in places hidden from the French by the mountains. The inclement weather continued; large drops of rain interspersed with flakes of snow; impenetrable fog made it impossible to see anything within ten paces. The troops spent the night almost without sleep; Suvorov and the Grand Duke spent the night in a sheep stall.

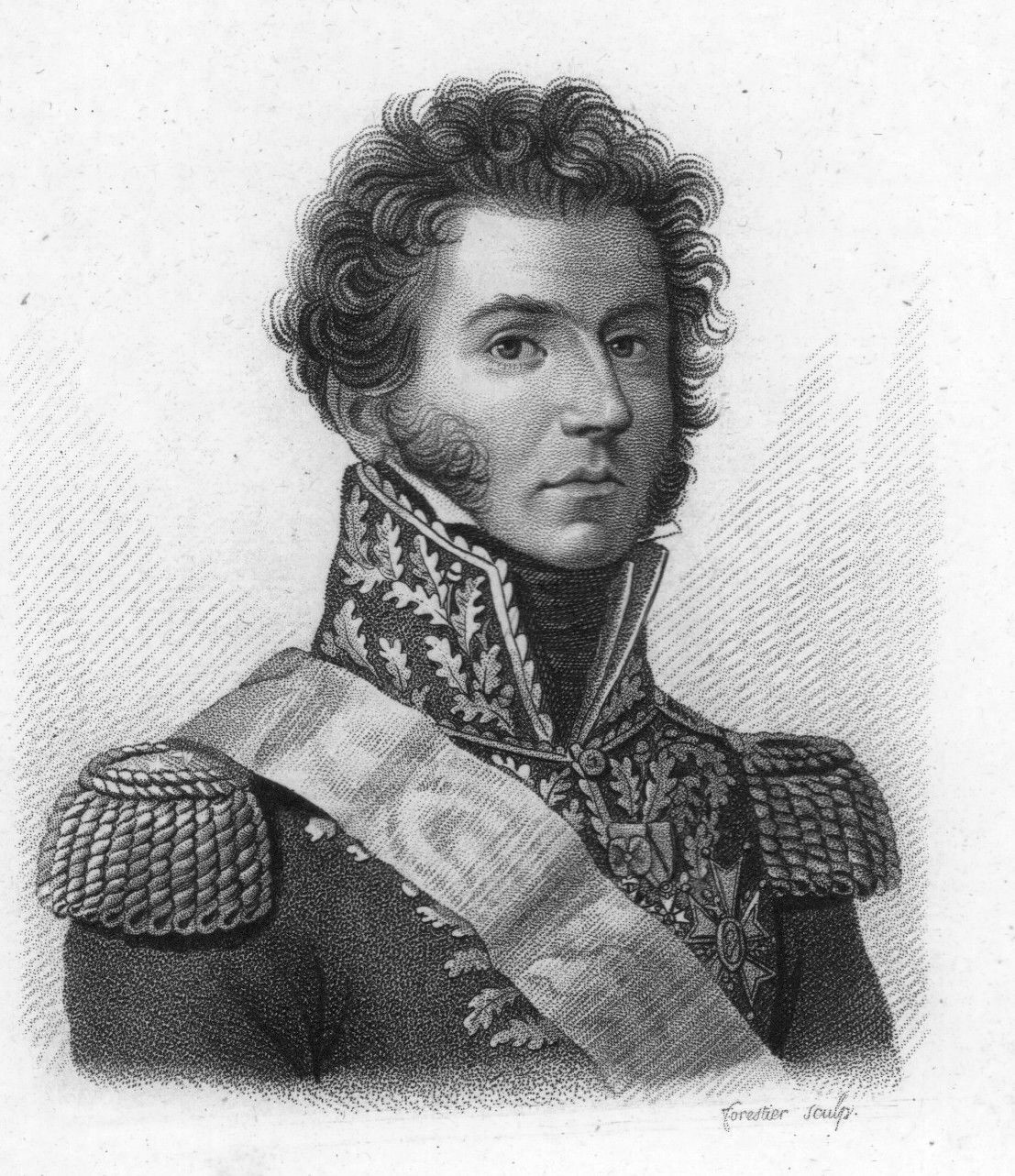
Général de brigade Molitor

The evening attacks failure forced Prince Bagration to take additional measures to ensure success for the morning. Taking advantage of the fog and impenetrable darkness, several battalions climbed the cliffs to the left and positioned themselves on the half-hill, in two lines, very close to the French, and Lieutenant-Colonel Count Zuccato with 2 battalions, 4 Austrian companies and 2 sotnias dismounted Cossacks sneaked further and occupied the almost sheer cliffs commanding the enemy's right flank. The troops were hungry, many men had not seen breadcrumbs for days; they were barefoot and almost naked, but all were eager to meet the French. In the battle result lay their hope for the best, for a way out of the present situation; death was not feared, nor was it thought of. Suvorov appeared in Bagration's detachment, soaked, trembling in his thin cloak; he looked for Bagration and, having found him, began to say that it was necessary to get through the next day to Glarus, that it was necessary to use every effort. Bagration calmed him, saying that "we would be in Glarus by all means" and explained what orders had been made for the morning. Suvorov approved of the measures taken, praised Bagration's firm determination and, escorted by him, returned to his lodging.

About midnight the French, hearing probably a noise on their right flank, sent patrols there to inspect the mountains. The patrols came upon a Russian picket, exchanged a few shots with it, and retreated. This circumstance, however, somewhat alarmed Molitor; not long before daylight he sent another, stronger detachment, still higher up the mountain, probably to take a strongpoint here and secure the flank; but the detachment was too late, the mountain being already in Russian hands. Then the French opened a heavy rifle fire all along the line at once, in spite of the darkness. This served as a signal to the Russian troops occupying the steep downhills; they all rushed forward to the shots, shouting hurrah. Many a man was here thwarted and killed; still more did the French suffer from this terrible, frenzied attack at random, on fire. Derfelden's troops, standing below on the road, also attacked from the front, and instantly drove the French from behind the church wall. Attacked from the front and flank, threatened from the rear, Molitor hastily retreated and was pursued along the narrow mountain road for 6.4 kilometres (4.0 mi), losing not a few men killed, wounded and captured.

== Following operations ==
Bagration would continue on, facing the French at Netstal and Näfels. While half of the Russian troops were thus making their way out of the Mutten valley, the other half remained near Mutten, securing the movement of the former from the rear.

== See also ==
- Battle of Cassano
- First Battle of Marengo
- Battle of the Trebbia
- Battle of Novi
- Battle of the Gotthard Pass
- Battle of Devil's Bridge
- Battle of the Muotatal
- Battle of Näfels

== Sources ==
- Duffy, Christopher (1999). Eagles Over the Alps: Suvorov in Italy and Switzerland, 1799. Chicago, Illinois: The Emperor's Press. pp. 236–241. ISBN 978-1883476182.
- Clodfelter, M. (2017). Warfare and Armed Conflicts: A Statistical Encyclopedia of Casualty and Other Figures, 1492–2015 (4th ed.). Jefferson, North Carolina: McFarland. p. 108. ISBN 978-0-7864-7470-7.
- Petrushevsky, Alexander (1884). "Швейцарская кампания: Муттенталь, Кленталь, Рингенкопф; 1799" [Swiss Campaign: Muttental, Klöntal, Ringenkopf]. Генералиссимус князь Суворов [Generalissimo Prince Suvorov] (in Russian). Vol. 3 (1st ed.). Saint Petersburg: Типография М. М. Стасюлевича. pp. 254–266.
- Milyutin, Dmitry (1853). История войны России с Францией в царствование Императора Павла I в 1799 году [The history of Russia's war with France during the reign of Emperor Paul I in 1799] (in Russian). Vol. 4. St. Petersburg: Типография штаба военно-учебных заведений.
- Bogdanovich, Modest (1846). Походы Суворова в Италии и Швейцарии [The campaigns of Suvorov in Italy and Switzerland]. St. Petersburg: Военная типография. pp. 176–179.
- Reding-Biberegg, Rudolf von (1895). Der Zug Suworoff's durch die Schweiz. 24. Herbst- bis 10. Weinmonat 1799 [The Suvorov's move across Switzerland. 24 September to 10 October 1799]. Zürich: Hans von Matt, Stans.
  - Reding-Biberegg, Rudolf von (1902). Поход Суворова через Швейцарию 24 Сентября – 10 Октября 1799 года [Suvorov’s campaign through Switzerland on September 24 – October 10, 1799]. Translated by Martynov, Yevgeny [in Russian]. St. Petersburg: Т-во Художественной Печати.
- Novitsky, Vasily; Schwarz, Alexei; Apushkin, Vladimir; Schulz, Gustav (1911). Баталион [Battalion]. Sytin Military Encyclopedia (in Russian). Vol. 4: Б – Бомба. Moscow: Типография Т-ва И. Д. Сытина. pp. 411–412.
