= Battle of Linth River =

1799 War of the Second Coalition battle in Switzerland

- Part of the Italian and Swiss expedition during the War of the Second Coalition
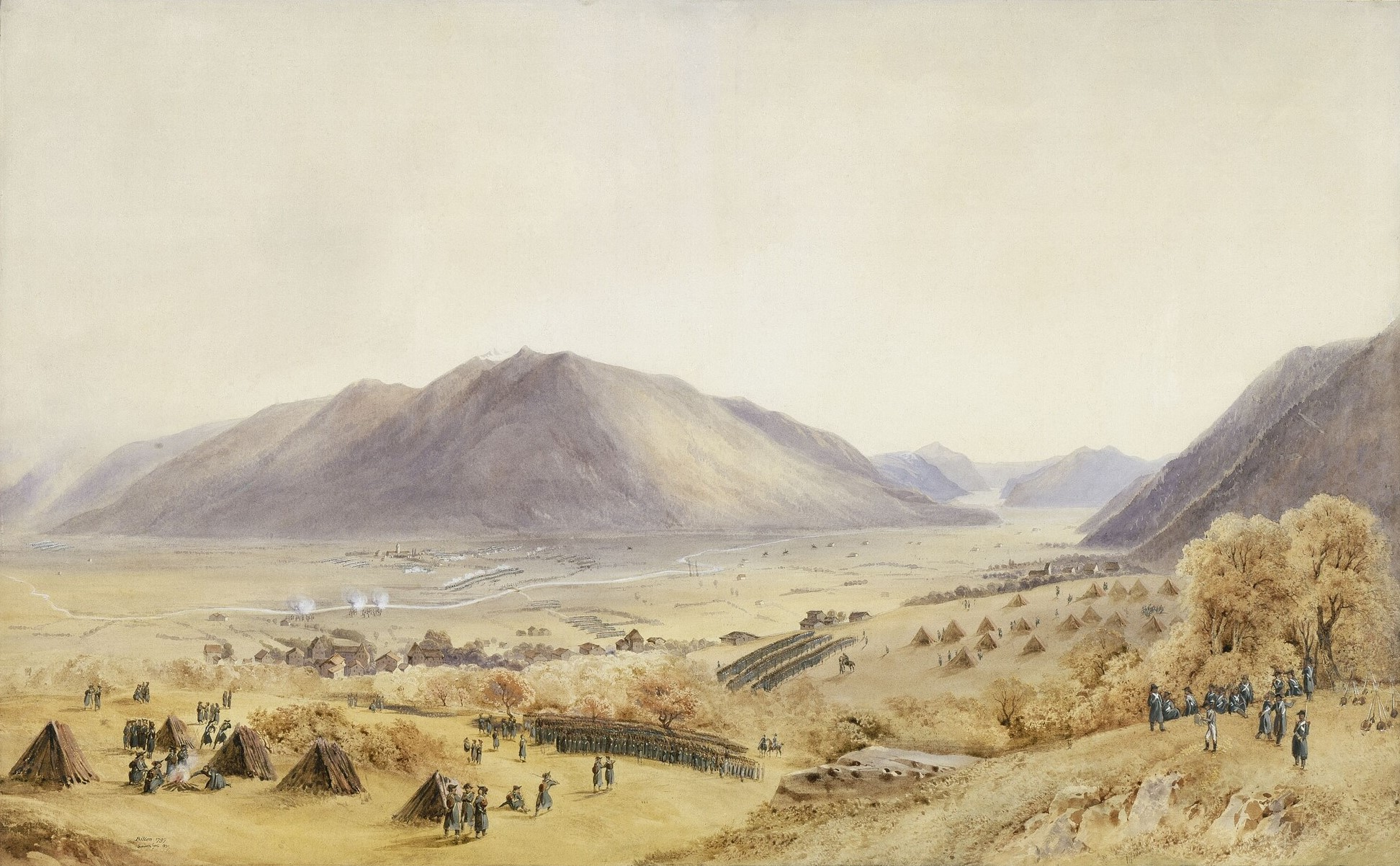
- Crossing of the Linth at Bilten, morning of 25 September 1799 by Siméon Fort, 1837
| Date | 25–26 September 1799 |
| Location | Bilten, Helvetic Republic 47°09′N 9°01′E |
| Result | French victory |

Belligerents
| France | (Holy Roman Empire) Austria (Russia) Russia; Swiss rebels |

Commanders and leaders
| (France) Jean-de-Dieu Soult (France) Gabriel Molitor | (Holy Roman Empire) Friedrich Hotze † (Holy Roman Empire) Franz Petrasch (Holy Roman Empire) Franz von Auffenberg (Holy Roman Empire) Friedrich von Linken (Holy Roman Empire) Franz Jellacic (Russia) Vasily Titov |

Strength
| Total: 14,500: Linth River: 11,500; Mollis: 3,000 | Total: 19,000: Linth River: 10,000; Mollis: 9,000 (in total) (Note: Scattered detachments of Jellacic, Linken and Auffenberg) |

Casualties and losses
| Total: 1,100: Linth River: 600; Mollis: 500 | Total: 6,500, 32 guns, 4 flags: Linth River: 5,000, 25 guns; Mollis: 1,500, 7 guns |

The Battle of (the) Linth River (25–26 September 1799) saw a French division under General of Division Jean-de-Dieu Soult face a force of Austrian, Imperial Russian, and Swiss rebel soldiers led by Feldmarschall-Leutnant Friedrich Freiherr von Hotze in Switzerland. Soult carefully planned and his troops carried out a successful assault crossing of the Linth River between Lake Zurich and the Walensee. Hotze's death early in the action disorganized the Allied defenders who were defeated and forced to retreat, abandoning supplies accumulated for Field Marshal Alexander Suvorov's approaching army. On the same day, General of Division André Masséna's French Army of Helvetia defeated Lieutenant General Alexander Korsakov's Russian army in the Second Battle of Zurich and Brigadier General Gabriel Jean Joseph Molitor's French brigade turned back another Austrian force near Mollis. Both Korsakov's Russians and Hotze's survivors, led by Feldmarschall-Leutnant Franz Petrasch withdrew north of the Rhine River.

These defeats were the result of a mismanaged Allied strategy that planned to unite the forces of Korsakov and Hotze with Suvorov's Russian army coming north from Italy. In accordance with the strategy, Feldzeugmeister Archduke Charles, Duke of Teschen's powerful Austrian army had marched from Zürich to southern Germany a few weeks before. Masséna and Soult won their victories in the narrow time window between Charles' departure and Suvorov's arrival. On 24 September, Suvorov's Russians captured the Gotthard Pass and marched into Switzerland. However, with Korsakov and Petrasch driven out of the country, Masséna turned his full attention upon Suvorov's army, setting the stage for an epic alpine campaign.

== Background ==
=== Allied strategy ===
In the summer of 1799, Allied strategists made what proved to be a gigantic strategic blunder. William Grenville, 1st Baron Grenville was the British Secretary of State for Foreign and Commonwealth Affairs under Prime Minister William Pitt the Younger. Grenville drew up a plan whereby Korsakov with 45,000 Russians would be joined in Switzerland by Suvorov with 20,000 Russians marching north from Italy. Suvorov would take command of the combined army and drive Masséna's French army from western Switzerland. In the second phase, Suvorov would thrust into Franche-Comté, an area of France defended by only a few frontier fortresses. Meanwhile, Archduke Charles would move north into Germany, leaving 18,000 Austrians under Hotze to cooperate with the Russians. Charles and 60,000 troops would strike across the lower Rhine from southern Germany into France. On the North Sea coast, an Anglo-Russian army would invade the Batavian Republic, a satellite of France. The plan was sent on 8 June to Emperor Paul I of Russia, who gave it his blessing. Emperor Francis and his foreign minister Johann Amadeus von Thugut approved the plan because it came to them via Emperor Paul and it was a good excuse to get Suvorov out of Italy. Fractures were appearing in the alliance as Russia and Austria were beginning to become suspicious of one another's aims.

On 7 August 1799, when the scheme was divulged to Archduke Charles, that general voiced his worries about the Russians, "I don't know how they will manage, especially if we take ourselves off any distance". Korsakov was shocked when the plan was revealed to him on 12 August. The Russian noted that his army's strength was 28,000 present under arms rather than the 45,000 assumed by the strategists. British agent William Wickham, who hoped to raise 20,000 pro-Allied Swiss troops, was disappointed that only 2,000 were recruited. The Army of Condé, made up of 6,000 French Royalists, was marching from Russia but would not arrive in southern Germany until 1 October. This situation was made worse because Hotze underestimated Massena's strength at 60,000 French and Swiss troops. In fact there were 76,000 altogether.

On 15 August 1799, Suvorov and the Austro-Russian army won the Battle of Novi in northwestern Italy. The Russian commander in chief wanted to pursue the beaten French army and chase it from Italy, but the Austrians put him off. In response to the loss of the Gotthard Pass, Suvorov sent Feldzeugmeister Paul Kray and 10,000 troops marching north on 18 August. Finally, on 25 August Suvorov received a letter from Emperor Francis stating that he must take his army into Switzerland. The Russian general asked for a two-month delay, but the Austrian emperor required that Suvorov march at once. Thugut also insisted that Charles take his army out of Switzerland immediately. In the end, the Allied strategy failed because of bad timing. Charles left Switzerland too early and Suvorov arrived in Switzerland too late. This left Korsakov and Hotze in a dangerous position to face Masséna's French army.

=== Operations ===
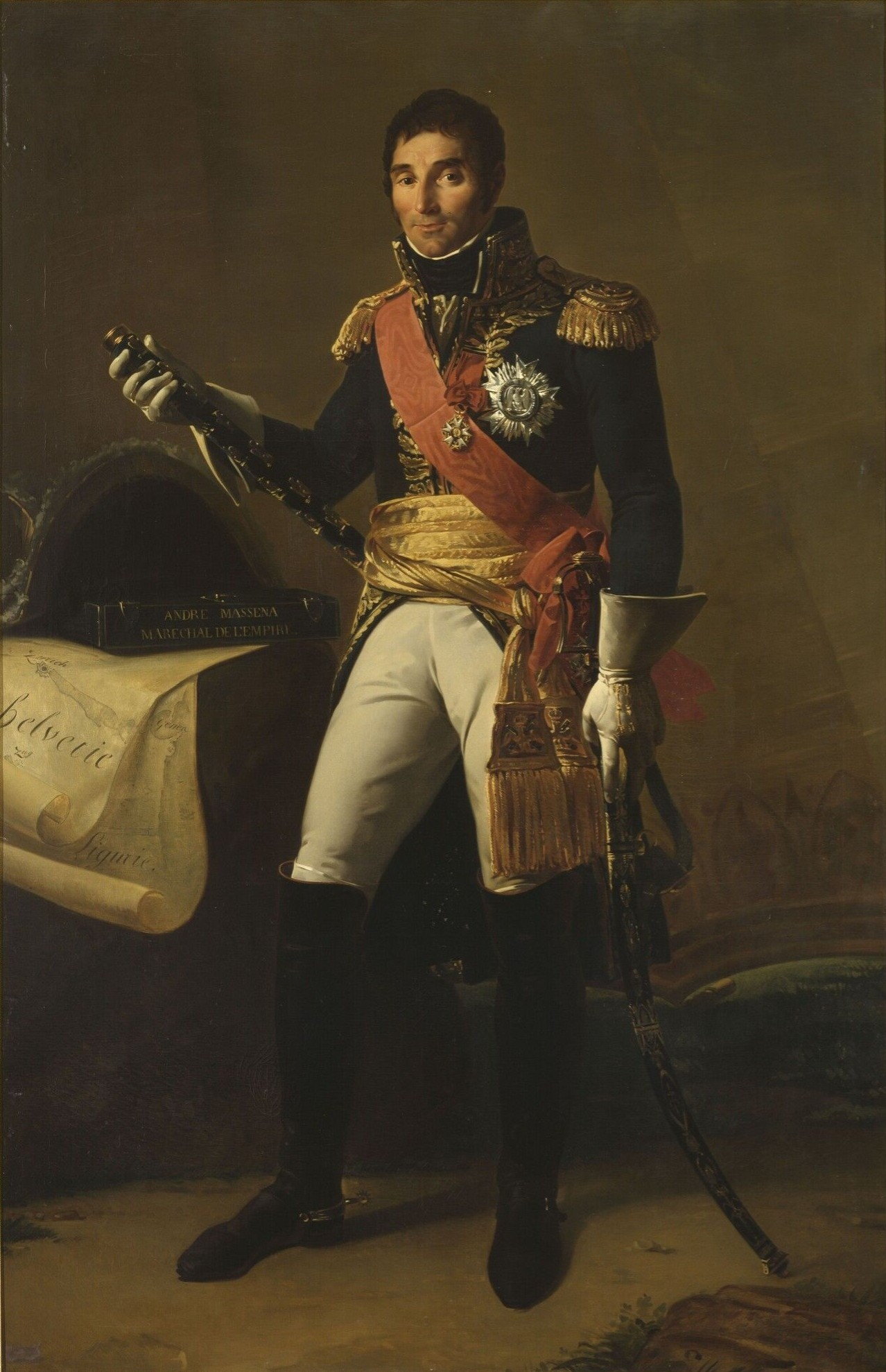
André Masséna

After the departure of Archduke Charles' army, the Allied troops in Switzerland were positioned as follows. Korsakov's 26,000-man Russian army held the line of the Limmat and Aare Rivers from Zürich northwest to the Rhine River. The northern shore of Lake Zurich was defended by 2,500 Austrian soldiers and Swiss rebels under Feldmarschall-Leutnant Duke Alexander of Württemberg, 2,000 Russians, and a small squadron of vessels under Colonel James Ernest Williams. Of the 18,000 soldiers under his command, Hotze personally led the 8,000 troops holding the Linth between Lake Zurich on the west and the Walensee on the east. The remaining 10,000 Austrians belonged to Feldmarschall-Leutnant Friedrich von Linkin's division. Of these, General-major Franz Jellacic commanded 4,500 troops at Sargans while Linkin controlled the 5,500 soldiers in the Vorderrhein valley. General-major Franz Xaver von Auffenberg 2,000-man brigade was detailed to cooperate with Suvorov while Linkin personally directed General-major Joseph Anton von Simbschen's 3,500-strong brigade. Colonel Gottfried von Strauch's 4,570 Austrians were also directed to support Suvorov. Strauch's brigade was not part of Hotze's command; instead he reported to Feldmarschall-Leutnant Karl Joseph Hadik von Futak from the Army of Italy.

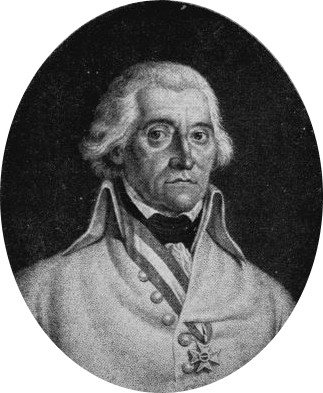
Friedrich von Hotze

Masséna's Army of Helvetia included divisions under Generals of Division Soult, Joseph Chabran, Louis Klein, Jean Thomas Guillaume Lorge, Claude Lecourbe, Louis Marie Turreau, Philippe Romain Ménard, Louis-Antoine Choin de Montchoisy, and Generals of Brigade Édouard Mortier and Jean Joseph Amable Humbert. The main body under Massena numbered 34,000 in the divisions of Klein, Lorge, Ménard, Mortier, and Humbert. The main body faced Korsakov from Zürich down the Limmat and Aare Rivers to the Rhine. Chabran's 9,700 troops guarded the Rhine west to Basel. Turreau's 9,600 men occupied the Canton of Valais to the far southwest and Montchoisy's 2,500 troops garrisoned places in the rear. Lecourbe had 11,800 soldiers in his division. General of Brigade Charles-Étienne Gudin guarded the Gotthard Pass and General of Brigade Louis Henri Loison held the upper Reuss River valley. Soult's 12,700 men faced Hotze along the Linth between Lake Zurich and the Walensee. General of Brigade Gabriel Jean Joseph Molitor's troops were on Soult's right defending the upper Linth. Molitor's brigade belonged to Lecourbe's division, though it was well to the east of Gudin and Loison. Molitor's brigade numbered 2,599 men.

The line held by Soult and Molitor formed a vulnerable salient in the French defenses. This would be attacked by Linkin whose Austrians would move north across the mountains from the Vorderrhein into the Sernftal to support Hotze. Jellacic would march west along the south shore of the Walensee to outflank the French positions on the Linth. Helped by Jellacic's turning movement, Hotze would break through the French positions on the Linth and advance up the west shore of Lake Zurich. Once Hotze's forces arrived near Zurich, Korsakov would attack Masséna's main body. Suvorov selected the Gotthard Pass as his entry point into Switzerland, though it was too rough for wheeled vehicles. He was assisted by Auffenberg's brigade which would march from Disentis to Amsteg in the upper Reuss valley. Suvorov's main column was equipped with 25 Piedmontese 2-pounder mountain cannons. The rest of Suvorov's artillery was sent across the Splügen Pass.

Masséna learned from a spy that Korsakov planned to attack him on 26 September 1799. Therefore, he made up his mind to assault Korsakov's position at Zurich a day earlier. The French commander in chief had no clue that Suvorov was advancing from Italy into Switzerland. At 5:00 am on 25 September, the Second Battle of Zurich began with an assault crossing of the Limmat at Dietikon. Korsakov was completely outgeneraled and the Russians ended the day within the walls of Zürich. The next day, Korsakov's army broke out and marched north to Eglisau on the Rhine, losing its wagon train and much of its artillery. Lecourbe's troops had already been defeated by Suvorov on 24 September in the Battle of the Gotthard Pass.

== Battle ==
=== Linth River ===
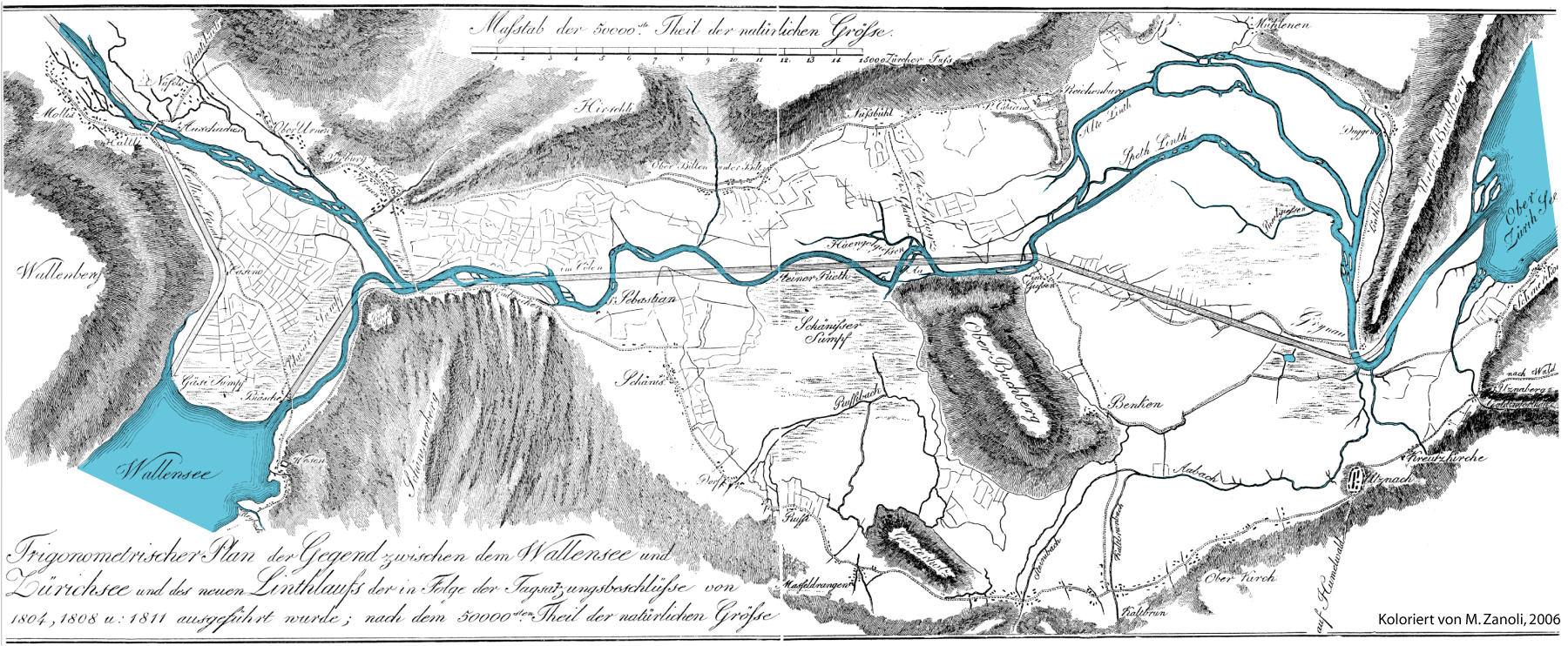
Map shows the Linth River before it was channelized in 1811, with Lake Zurich (R) and the Walensee (L). Northeast is down.

Soult's two brigades were led by Generals of Brigade Joseph Antoine Marie Mainoni and Anne Gilbert de Laval. Mainoni directed the 36th and 44th Line Infantry Demi-brigades while Laval commanded the 25th Light Infantry and 94th Line Infantry. The 10th Horse Chasseurs comprised the division's cavalry. Molitor's brigade consisted of the 84th Line Infantry. Hotze's subordinates were Petrasch who defended the Linth between Uznach and Weesen and Alexander of Württemberg who held the north shore of Lake Zurich. Petrasch's Austrian division included three battalions each of Infantry Regiments Gemmingen Nr. 21, Bender Nr. 41, and Stain Nr. 50, two battalions of Infantry Regiment Nr. 60, and 10 squadrons of the Széckler Grenz Hussar Regiment Nr. 11. Württemberg directed six squadrons of Waldeck Dragoon Regiment Nr. 7, and the Rovéréa and Bachmann Swiss battalions. Williams commanded 19 vessels armed with 13 guns and manned by 211 crewmen. At Rapperswil on Lake Zurich were two Russian battalions of the Razumovsky Infantry Regiment under General-major Vasily Titov.

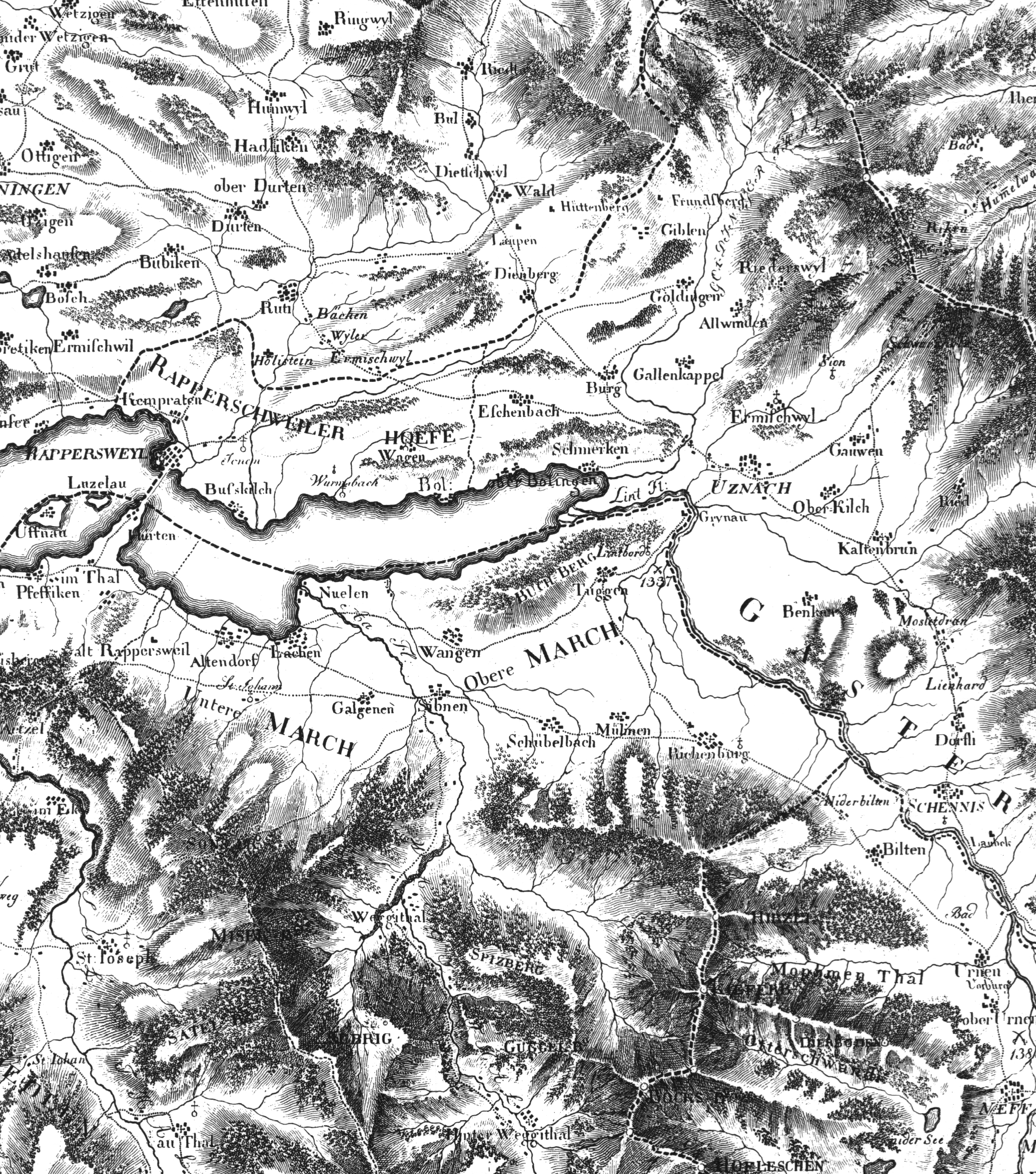
1796 map shows eastern Lake Zurich and the Linth River. Grynau is where the Linth sharply bends near Lake Zurich. Bilten and Schänis are to the lower right.

The Linth had two fords near Bilten and Schänis and bridges at Grynau Castle and the Tuilerie (brickworks). For ten days prior to his attack, Soult dressed himself in the uniform of a private soldier and spent one hour on sentry duty at a different forward post, carefully observing the Austrian positions. While the Austrians fired upon any soldiers who approached the banks of the Linth, they left sentries alone. On 22 September, Adjutant General Jean-Pierre Dellard of the 36th Line approached Soult and told him that he suspected a battle was imminent. He presented a plan to employ swimmers in advance of an assault crossing and Soult adopted it. Soult planned to cross at Bilten, preceded by Dellard's swimmers and at Grynau. Soult also commandeered some boats that he hoped might challenge Williams' small squadron. An artillery battery was built opposite Rapperswil in order to limit the Austrian squadron's movements on Lake Zurich.

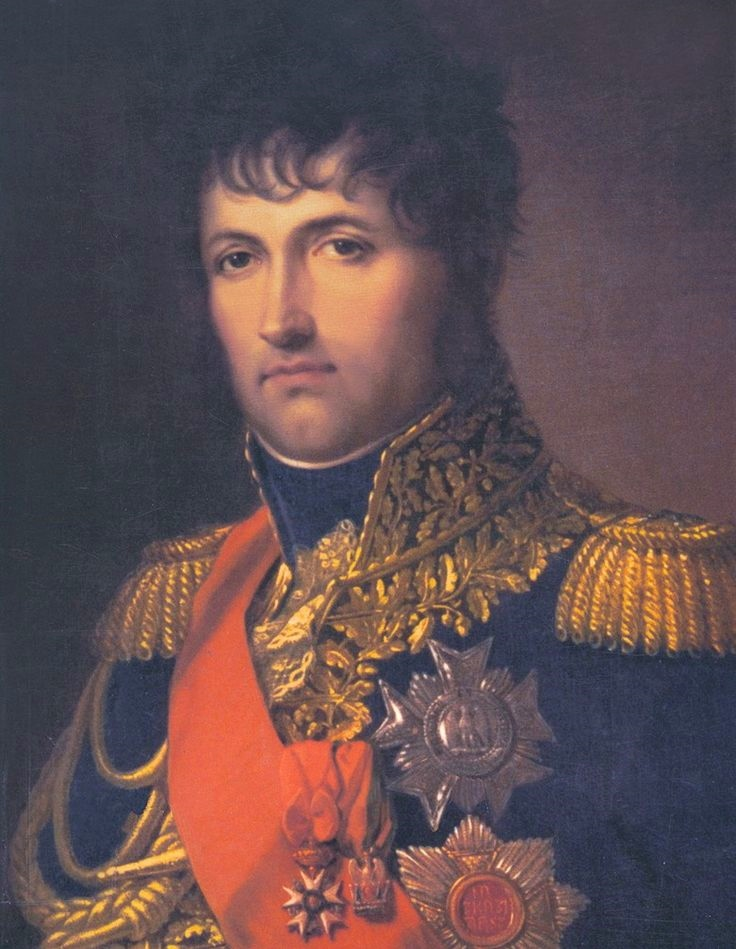
Jean-de-Dieu Soult

On the night of 24 September, 2,000 soldiers brought up fascines which were used to create a 300 yards (274 m) long path through the marsh at Bilten. The path was then covered by wooden beams so that bridging materials could be brought up. That night Dellard and 150 swimmers approached the river, wearing only their shirts and with their breeches tied around their ankles. At 2:30 am they slipped into the Linth. Each man had a pistol and cartridges tied to his head with a handkerchief, a lance tied to his left shoulder, and a saber in his mouth. There were also ten drummers and four buglers. Some men turned back and a few men drowned, including one drummer whose drum filled with water and dragged him down. Some Austrian sentries were dispatched with sabers and the group splashed through the march to rout a nearby outpost. Dellard gave the signal for the boats to cross the river then led his party to attack an Austrian camp, with musicians drumming and trumpeting, and the others firing their pistols. Some Swiss or Alsatians dressed in Austrian uniform went ahead, shouting in German, "Save yourselves. We are betrayed". Behind them, the French surged across the river in boats and rafts.

A thick fog assisted Soult's attack which was also successful at Grynau Castle. The boats were used to ferry some soldiers across Lake Zurich to Schmerikon. Hotze was awakened at 4:00 am by cannon fire. He rode from his headquarters at Kaltbrunn to Schänis where he found his troops defending themselves stoutly. Hearing of trouble at Weesen, he turned toward the Walensee to investigate. On the way, Hotze rode into two French battalions in a forest and was shot dead, together with his chief of staff, Colonel Plunket. Petrasch took over the command but he brought up reinforcements too slowly. By the time they arrived, the French artillery was across the river and repulsed the Austrian counterattacks. Hard fighting went on until a final Austrian attack collapsed, with many of the soldiers captured. Meanwhile, Soult's improvised fleet attacked Rapperswil. Petrasch ordered the Russians and the Swiss to retreat to St. Gallen while withdrawing the Austrians first to Lichtensteig and then Rheineck. At St. Gallen, the Russians headed for northwest to Konstanz while the Swiss marched northeast to Rheineck at the southeast end of Lake Constance.

Part of Petrasch's division was trapped at Weesen and compelled to surrender. Soult claimed to have captured 3,500 men, 25 guns, four colors, and Williams' flotilla. At Rapperswil, the French also seized a magazine of supplies intended for Suvorov's army. Another source gave French losses as 1,100 killed, wounded, and missing. The Allies lost 3,500 prisoners, 20 guns, 33 ammunition limbers, and the color of the 2nd Battalion of the Bender Regiment. The Russians reported 195 killed and 39 missing.

=== Mollis and Glarus ===
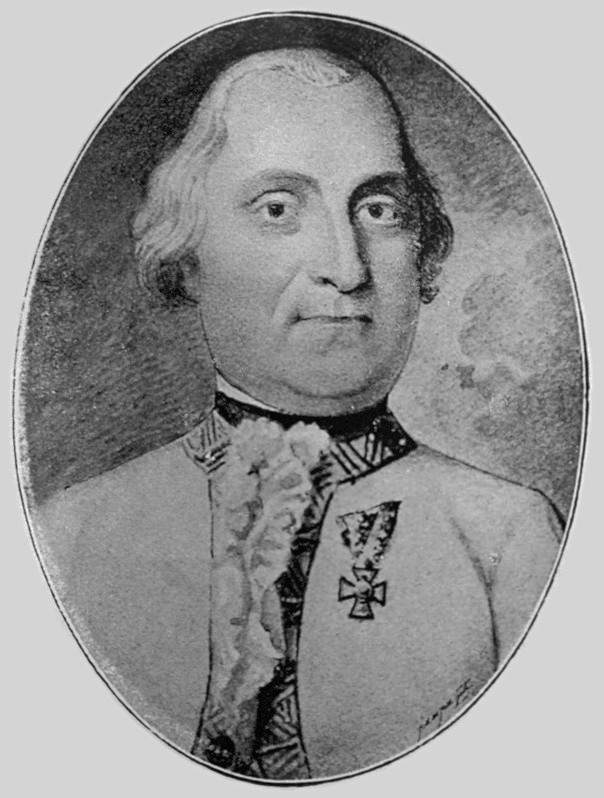
Franz Jellacic

On 24 September, Jellacic marched from Sargans northwest to the Walensee and then west along its south shore to Mollis. He attacked Molitor's brigade the next day. This was the same day as Soult and Hotze were fighting on the lower Linth. Jellacic arrived in Soult's right rear, but was unable to dislodge Molitor's defenders in their positions along the upper Linth. In addition to three battalions of the 84th Line, Molitor's force included three battalions of the 76th Line. Jellacic commanded one battalion of the Kaiser Infantry Regiment Nr. 1, two battalions of the Kaunitz Infantry Nr. 20, the Strozzi Light Battalion Nr. 1, the 2nd, 3rd, and 4th Battalions of the Peterwardeiner Grenz Regiment Nr. 9, the 1st Battalion of the Broder Grenz Nr. 7, and three squadrons of the Modena Dragoon Regiment Nr. 5. Molitor counterattacked on 26 September after learning of Soult's victory. Jellacic began to retreat at 2:00 pm to Walenstadt on the western end of the Walensee. Jellacic soon withdrew to Maienfeld in the Rhine valley. He lost 500 men captured. Other French and Austrian casualties are not known.

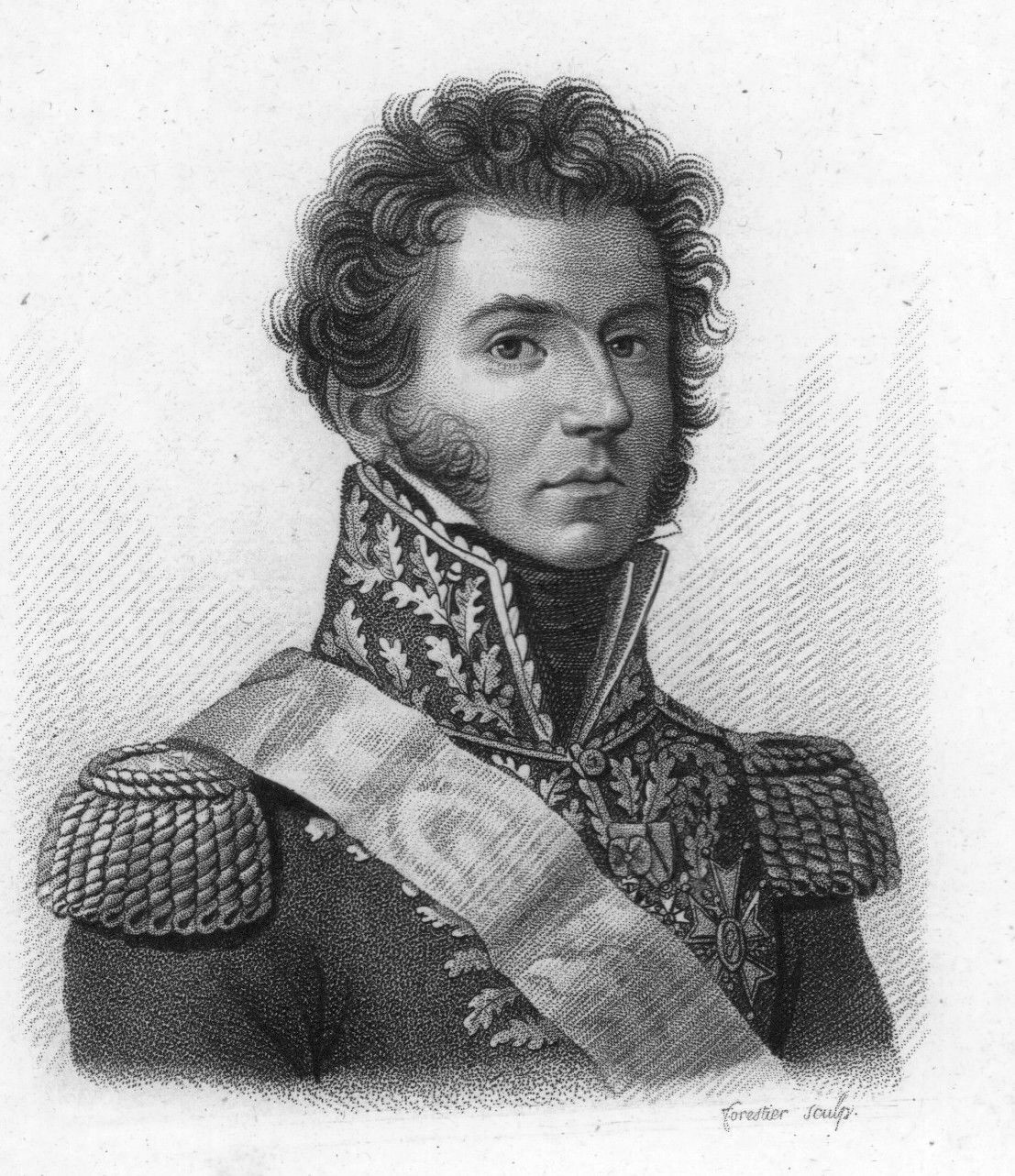
Gabriel Molitor

Linkin's force crossed the Panix, Segnas, and Kisten Passes on 25 September. When his troops descended into the Sernftal, they surprised two battalions of the 76th Line Infantry. Linkin scored a coup when 1,300 French soldiers surrendered in a body at Wichlen. According to another source, the number of captured French soldiers was 900, though it notes that both the 1st and 2nd Battalions of the 76th lost their colors. Simbschen's brigade, under Linkin, was made up of two battalions of the Kaiser Infantry Regiment Nr. 1, and one battalion each of the Kaunitz Infantry Nr. 20, Infantry Nr. 62, and Peterwardeiner Grenz Nr. 9. On 26 September Linkin's force seized Schwanden and pushed back the 3rd Battalion of the 84th Line beyond Glarus. Soult sent the 1st and 3rd Battalions of the 44th Line to Molitor as reinforcements.

Molitor attacked on 27 September but was repulsed. Linkin counterattacked later in the day but was unable to capture Glarus. The next day Linkin received a misleading message from an Austrian officer that Suvorov was heading west toward Schwyz. On 29 September, Molitor attacked with five battalions, but the Austrians were holding their ground when a message arrived for Linkin at mid-morning. Possibly from a double agent, it falsely stated that the Muotatal was in French hands. Since he had not heard from Hotze or Suvorov, Linkin ordered a retreat and his troops retraced their steps up the Sernftal and over the mountains to the Rhine valley. The French captured 300 Austrians. Ironically, Molitor was unable to pursue because he received a report of an enemy column coming over the Pragel Pass into his rear. It was Auffenberg's brigade which was the advance guard of Suvorov's army. Molitor's troops hurried off to fight Auffenberg.

On 26 September, Masséna read Lecourbe's report that Suvorov's army captured Gotthard Pass and would soon be at Altdorf. He sent Mortier's division marching south to Schwyz and ordered Soult's division to block the Linth valley near Schänis. The French were now in a position to trap Suvorov's army between Schwyz and Glarus.

== Commentary ==
Historian Ramsay Weston Phipps harshly criticized Korsakov and Petrasch for their rapid and lengthy retreat after the battles at Zürich and the Linth River. He noted that the two forces were badly defeated, but that it was important that they try to hold "each inch of ground" because their leaders knew Suvorov was approaching. Phipps wrote that they could have taken up a number of defensive positions between Lake Zurich and the Rhine. As it was, Massena only pursued Korsakov with 250 cavalry and two cannons. The Army of Condé was available and so were 5,400 Austrians under Friedrich Joseph, Count of Nauendorf. Phipps thought that Jellacic and Linken showed "slackness" by abandoning their operations too easily. He compared them with Molitor, who showed great "tenacity".
