= Giorgio Giovanni Zuccato =

Russian Italian general

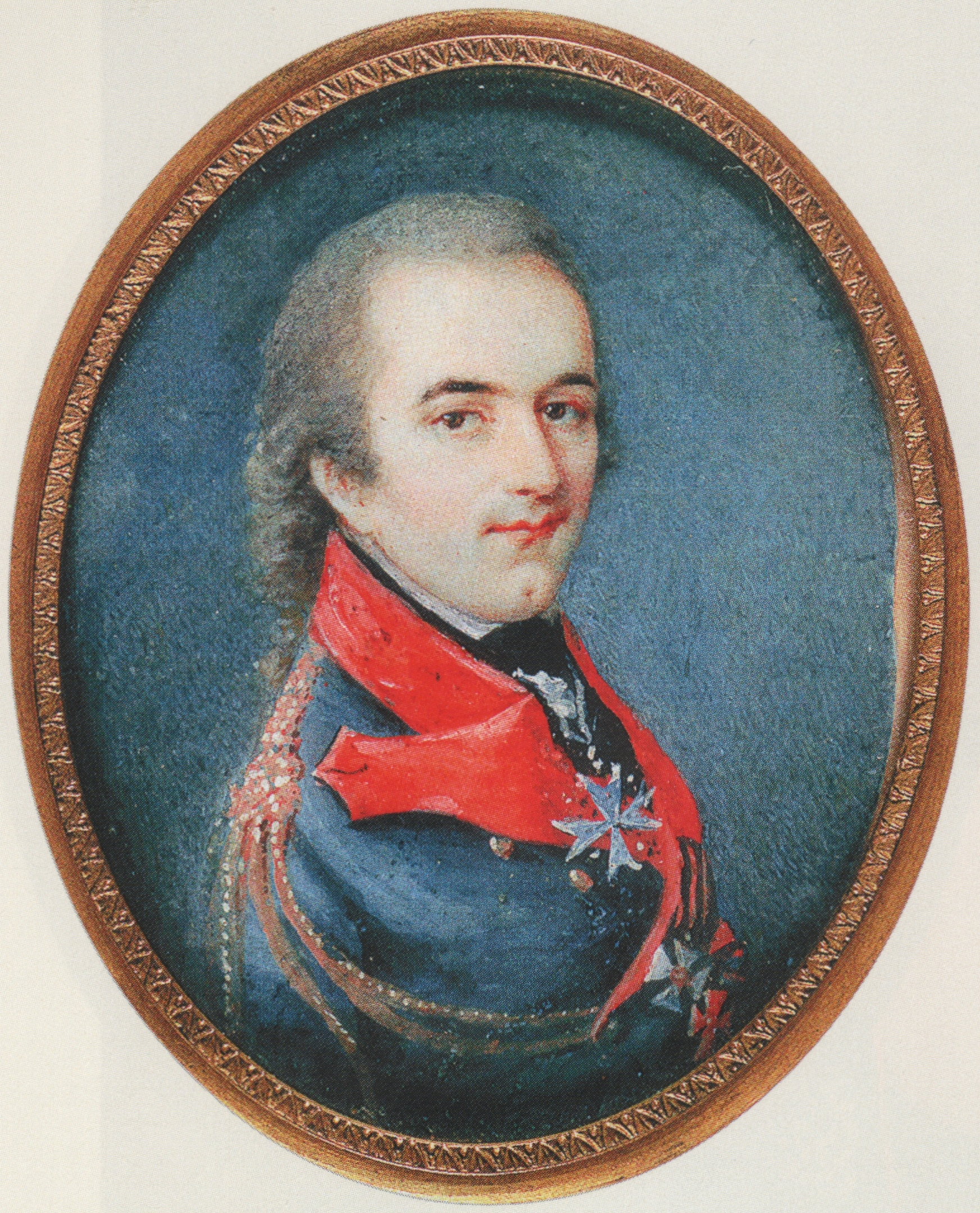

Giorgio Giovanni Zuccato (in Russian: Егор Гаврилович Цукато/Yegor Gavrilovich Zuccato; 27 September 1761 in Parenzo – 25 August 1810 in Gogoșu) was a naturalized Russian Italian general, in the service of the Russian Imperial Army during the French Revolutionary Wars, particularly distinguished under the orders of the general Alexander Suvorov during the campaigns in Italy and Switzerland in 1799. In June 1810 Count Nikolay Kamensky entrusted him with the task of helping the anti-Turkish revolt in Serbia led by Karađorđe Petrović, which he did brilliantly starting from 5 June of the same year, conquering the redoubts of Dudu and Brza Palanka, he besieged Kladovo and Prahovo, and conquered Brza Palanka by opening a corridor of direct communication between Little Wallachia and Serbia, and for this, he was awarded the Order of St. Anne first-class (14 July).

== Biography ==
He was born in Parenzo, then an integral part of the Republic of Venice, on 24 September 1761, into a family belonging to the Venetian nobility, son (Note: La coppia ebbe altri sette figli, e inoltre nella casa convivevano anche il fratello di Gabriele, Giovanni, sacerdote, e una cameriera.) of Gabriele and Elisabetta Morelli. At the age of four, he was entrusted to his mother's brother, Carlo Morelli (1730–1792), councilor of the joint counties of Gorizia and Gradisca, and therefore a subject of the Empress Maria Theresa of Austria.

In 1772 Carlo Morelli was commissioned to accompany two of the sons of the Coronini counts to Stuttgart, to enroll them in the Carlsschule, a military academy founded two years earlier by the Grand Duke Carl II Eugen, Duke of Württemberg. On the trip, he also took his nephew with him, although he had no intention of enrolling him in the school, and he introduced himself with the three young men to the duke who specifically asked Morelli to enroll his nephew in the military school as well. The duke took him in favor by authorizing him to boast the title of duke and appointing his page of the court. He distinguished himself during his studies, (Note: La coppia ebbe altri sette figli, e inoltre nella casa convivevano anche il fratello di Gabriele, Giovanni, sacerdote, e una cameriera.) obtaining numerous awards, and being promoted to lieutenant in 1778. On 1 March 1783, at the end of the Academy, he became lieutenant of the Hunters' Corps, and on 30 July 1787, lieutenant of the foot guard.

With the outbreak of the Russian-Turkish war of 1787, he decided to move to Russia, entering the following year in the service of Empress Catherine II with the rank of major. In 1788, assigned to one of the most prestigious regiments of the Russian imperial army, the Chuguev regiment, he participated in the siege of Ochakov, where he was decorated with the 4th class Order of St. George. He then fought during the Russian-Swedish war of 1788–1790, under the command of Karl Heinrich von Nassau-Siegen, and after the capture of Tighina in November 1789, he was sent by Count Potemkin to announce it to the Austrian Emperor Joseph II. He then distinguished himself in the naval battle of Rochensalm (28 June 1790) in command of a floating gunboat, the Empress in 1791 gave him a golden sword and promotion to lieutenant colonel, backdated to 1787, assigning him to service to the 1st Marine Infantry Regiment. After the signing of the Treaty of Värälä, he was transferred to the personal court of Colonel-General Semyon Zorich, in Shklow in Belarus, and met them and married the general's niece, Aleksandra Petrovna Vojnova. The couple had four children, Nikolai Yegorovich, Giorgio, Julia Yegorovna, and Aleksandra Yegorovna.

Put to rest on 29 November 1792, Zuccato was transferred to the medal regiment of horse grenadiers on 1 October 1794, taking part in the Polish campaign where he distinguished himself during the assault on the fortified suburb of Praga, in Warsaw, located on the right bank of the Vistula. For this fact, he was awarded the Order of St. Vladimir of the fourth class. In September 1794, during a diplomatic mission, he presented his homages to the King of Prussia Frederick II, who after taking the suburb of Praga awarded him the Order Pour le Mérite. On 24 February 1797, he was put to rest, returning on 8 March 1799 to follow the army corps of General Andrey Grigoryevich Rosenberg during the Italian campaign launched by General Alexander Suvorov. After the occupation of Turin (5 May), he was transferred to the army corps of General Pyotr Ivanovich Bagration distinguishing himself in the occupation of Pinerolo, and then took part in the battle of the Trebbia (19 June). In July he was instructed by Suvorov to travel to Tuscany and the territories of the Papal State to organize the popular militias and train them in the use of the bayonet, nominally placed under the orders of the cavalry general Wilhelm Derfelden. On July 16 he arrived in Florence, and the next day in Acquapendente, where he found a good number of armed nobles, ecclesiastics, and peasants, organizing his own militia. Defeated a French formation, on 25 July he arrived in Arezzo, and two days later in Magione. On July 18 he again defeated the French, and three days later occupied Perugia. He then ceded command of the militia to the Austrian ensign Carl Schneider baron von Arno. Suvorov carried out the task personally reported it to Tsar Paul I. After the battle of Novi, and the subsequent surrender of Tortona, Suvorov transferred the army to Switzerland to support the operations of General Aleksandr Mikhailovich Rimsky-Korsakov. In Switzerland, Zuccato distinguished himself during the conquest of the Gotthard pass (24 September) and then on the mountains near Lake Klöntal (1 October), as well as participating at Schwanden (5 October). On October 30 of the same year, he was promoted to major general, skipping the rank of colonel, with the seniority assigned to him from November 26, 1798.

On 7 March 1800, he was again discharged, but already on 8 November he was reinstated in active service and appointed councilor at the War College, a position he held until 3 August 1808, when he was again recalled to active service. In 1809, during the new Russo-Turkish war he obtained the command of a military detachment in Little Wallachia, distinguishing himself against the Turks near Rassevat (4 September), 8 January 1810, and was decorated with the Order of St. George of the third class.

In June 1810, Count Nikolay Kamensky entrusted him with the task of helping the anti-Turkish revolt in Serbia led by Karađorđe Petrović. He left Craiova on 5 June and crossed the Danube on the 16th of the same month, reuniting with the Serbs. In the following months, the Russians and Serbs stormed the redoubts of Dudu and Brza Palanka, besieged Kladovo and Prahovo. In particular, for the taking of Brza Palanka, extremely important, because it opened a corridor of direct communication between Little Wallachia and Serbia, he was awarded the first-class Order of St. Anne. On July 20 and August 2, he again defeated the Turks at Praov. He died suddenly in Gogoșu on 25 August 1810, a victim of a grenade explosion thrown by Turks.

== Honors ==
Russian honors:

- 1st class Knight of the Order of Saint Anna – ribbon for ordinary uniform 1st class Knight of the Order of Saint Anna – 1810;
- 4th class Knight of the Order of Saint George – ribbon for ordinary uniform 4th class Knight of the Order of Saint George – 14 April 1789;
- Knight of the 3rd class of the Order of St. George – ribbon for ordinary uniform Knight of the 3rd class of the Order of St. George;
- 4th class Knight of the Order of Saint Vladimir – ribbon for ordinary uniform 4th class Knight of the Order of Saint Vladimir – 1794;
- Golden Weapon for Bravery – ribbon for ordinary uniform Golden Sword of Courage.

Foreign honors:

- Knight of the Order Pour le Mérite – ribbon for ordinary uniform Knight of the Order Pour le Mérite – 2.

== See also ==
- French Revolutionary Wars
- Alexander Suvorov
