= Siege of Ragusa (1806) =

Battle during the Napoleonic Wars

- Part of the Second Archipelago Expedition during the Napoleonic Wars
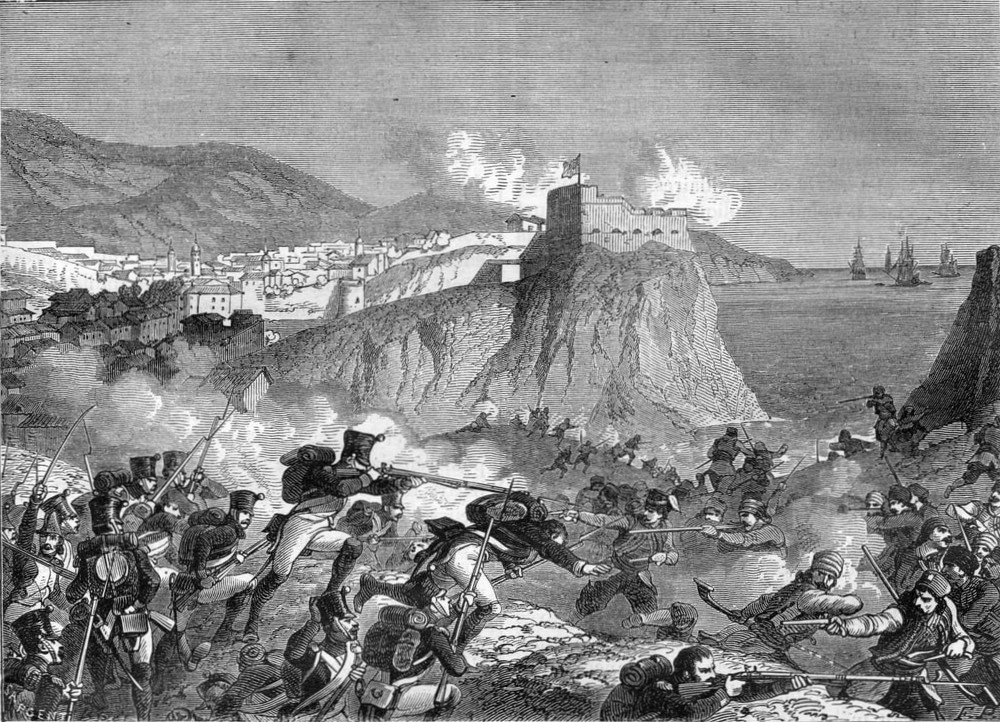
- Siege of Ragusa (illustration by H. F. Philippoteaux, c. 1870)
Date	27 May – 1 October 1806
Location	Republic of Ragusa (inclusive of the city of Ragusa, which is present-day Dubrovnik, Croatia)
Result	French victory

Belligerents
France; • Ragusa	Russia; Montenegro

Commanders and leaders
(First French Empire) Auguste de Marmont (First French Empire) Jacques Lauriston (Note: in Dubrovnik) (First French Empire) Gabriel Molitor	(Russian Empire) Dmitry Senyavin (Prince-Bishopric of Montenegro) Petar I Petrović-Njegoš

Units involved
Unknown	(Russian Empire) Imperial Russian Navy; (Russian Empire) Vitebsk Musketeers; (Russian Empire) 13th Jaeger Regiment

Strength
1,000–1,500 French (regulars) in Dubrovnik (Note: Estimates: • 1,000; • 1,500); 3,000 regulars and 4,000 Ragusians on Mount Bargart (Note: For some reason, Srđ is mentioned in Bronevsky's chronicles as Bargart.) (under Lauriston), plus 16 cannon 3,000 of Molitor's reinforcement per Senyavin, total: 12,000 regulars 3,000 Ragusians	2,300–3,000 Russian regulars (Note: Estimates: • 2,300; • 3,000); 5,000 Montenegrins approx. 7,000 maritimes (Note: 12,000 Montenegrins and other maritimes.); Russian fleet, total: 10 ships of the line 5 frigates 6 corvettes 6 brigs 12 gunboats

Casualties and losses
Unknown	Greater casualties than France

The siege of Ragusa took place in 1806 during the Napoleonic Wars (the War of the Third Coalition in a certain period).

After French occupied the maritime republic of Ragusa, Russian and allied forces under the leadership of Vice Admiral Dmitry Senyavin laid siege to it for months. The Russian allies included Montenegrins, commanded by the Orthodox bishop of Montenegro, Petar I Petrović-Njegoš. Divisional general Auguste de Marmont was the "ruler" and supreme commander in the republic. The siege saw several stormings/engagements at local strongholds with varying results, but it all eventually resulted in the Russian alliance abandoning the siege attempt when French General G. Molitor appeared in the rear and thus saved the republic. Molitor, under the command of Jean-de-Dieu Soult, once managed to hold back the onslaught of Generalissimo Alexander Suvorov-Rymniksky at Näfels during the battle of Glarus; now he received the glory of being the victor over Admiral Dmitry Senyavin.

During the siege, Senyavin and French General Jacques Lauriston, who commanded in the city of Ragusa (now Dubrovnik), conducted extensive correspondence and even met in person.
