= Ferdinand-Isaac de Rovéréa =

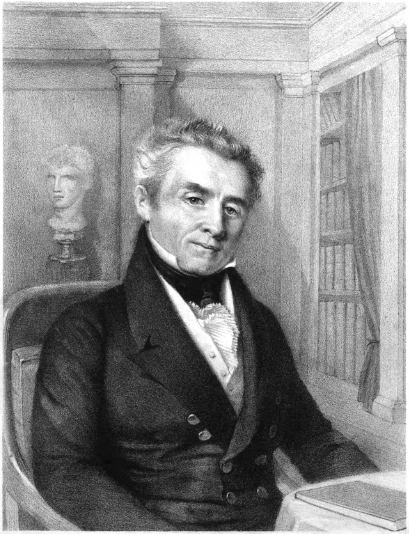
Portrait of Ferdinand-Isaac de Rovéréa. Lithography by E. Schultess

Colonel Ferdinand-Isaac de Rovéréa (French pronunciation: [fɛʁdinɑ̃ izak də ʁɔveʁea]; Vevey, 10 February 1763 -- Baveno, 8 August 1829) was a Swiss military officer and counter-revolutionary, who fought in French and British service during the French Revolutionary Wars.

== Biography ==
After serving in Erlachts' Swiss with the French army, Rovéréa enrolled in the service of the canton of Bern.

In February 1798, Rovéréa constituted a 600-man strong "Faithful Legion" (Légion fidèle) to defend Bern against Revolutionary influence from France. On 5 March, French troops invaded Switzerland, capturing the city of Bern, and Rovéréa gave battle near Nidau; he surrendered three days later in Thielle.

The next year, Rovéréa was exiled to Germany, where he constituted a 14-company regiment fighting with the British, comprising two chasseur companies. They took part in several battles, sustaining heavy casualties.

Rovéréa returned to Switzerland in 1801, and became one of the leaders of the Aristocratic Party of Vaud. He eventually came to terms with the independence of Vaud from Bern.
