= Honoré Théodore Maxime Gazan de la Peyrière =

French general (1765–1845)

Theodore-Maxime Gazan
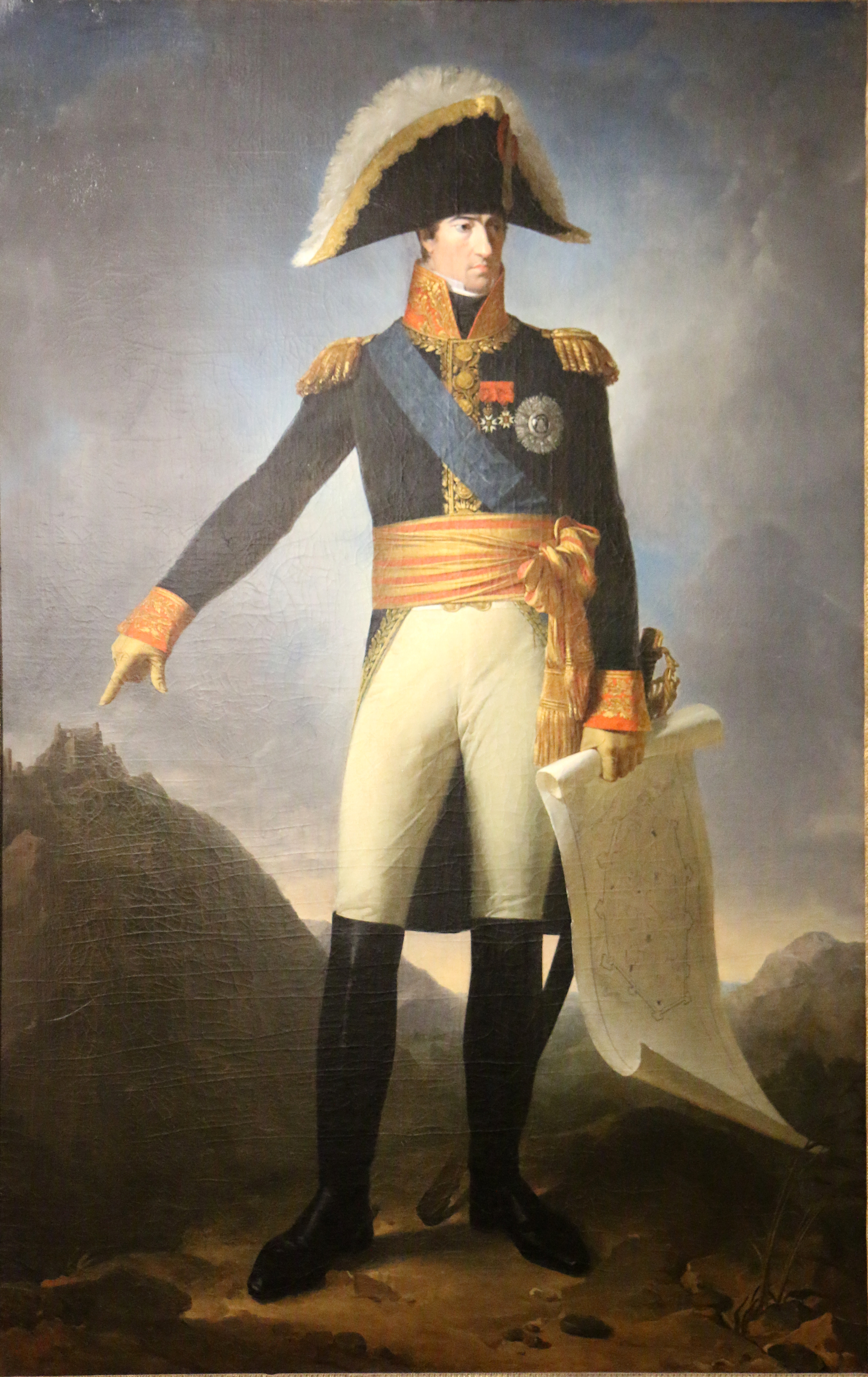
- General of Division Honoré Gazan by Charles Nègre
- Born: 29 October 1765; Grasse, Alpes-Maritimes
- Died: 9 April 1845 (aged 79); Grasse, Alpes-Maritimes
- Military career
- Service years: 1775–1815
- Rank: Lieutenant General
- Conflicts: French Revolutionary Wars; Napoleonic Wars
- Awards: Officer's Grand Cross, Legion of Honor; Peer of France, 1831.

Honoré Théodore Maxime Gazan de la Peyrière (French pronunciation: [ɔnɔʁe teɔdɔʁ maksim ɡazɑ̃ də la peʁjɛʁ]; 29 October 1765 – 9 April 1845) was a French general who fought in the French Revolutionary Wars and the Napoleonic Wars.

Gazan started his military career as a cannonier in the French Coast Guard. He was later appointed to the Royal Life Guards and, upon the beginning of the French Revolution in 1789, he joined the French National Guard. After service in the Upper Rhine valley and the Netherlands, he joined André Masséna in Switzerland in 1799, and fought at the battles of Winterthur, First Zurich, Näfels, and Schwanden. In August 1805, Gazan commanded of a division of the Army that encircled the Austrians in Ulm. On 11 November, under Joseph Mortier, his division provided the advance guard in the advance on Vienna. Mortier over-extended his line of march and Gazan's division was surrounded by Kutuzov's Coalition army; Gazan lost 40 percent of his force in the Battle of Dürenstein. Following the Prussian defeat at the Battle of Jena-Auerstadt, he transferred with Jean Lannes to the Iberian Peninsula. There he participated in the French capture of Zaragoza and in several important actions of the long Peninsular War, including the Battle of Albuera and the Battle of Vitoria.

During the Hundred Days, Gazan eventually joined Napoleon's cause, although he did not have a field command. In 1815, he judged Michel Ney's trial for treason but refused to reach a verdict. He dabbled briefly, and unsuccessfully, in politics in the 1820s. In 1830, he was raised to the French peerage and held a divisional command in Marseille, but by then was an old man, and he retired in 1832. He died in 1845.

== Family and early military career ==
Gazan was born in the small town of Grasse, in the Alpes-Maritimes. His father, a lawyer, sent him to the college of Sorèze, where he received military training. Gazan became a second lieutenant in the Coast Guard cannoniers of Antibes at the age of fifteen. In 1786, he was appointed to the Royal Life Guards, Company Écossaise. Later, he also joined the Freemasons.

== French Revolutionary Wars ==
At the outbreak of the French Revolution in 1789, Gazan returned to Grasse and joined the National Guard. In 1790, he became a captain and, in 1791, a lieutenant colonel of the local volunteer battalion of the Var. In 1792, with the declaration of war with Austria, he was sent to the 27th Regiment. His regiment first served garrison duty in Strasbourg, but in December 1793, participated in the Battle of Wissembourg. In May 1794, Gazan became a battalion commander of the new 54th Demi-Brigade. On 4 July, he routed the Prussians in Kuppenheim by ordering his drummers to beat a charge, convincing the Prussians that they were outnumbered. He was promoted to brigade colonel on 11 July and led his troops to victory against the Prussians at Trippstadt.

In 1796, he joined the Army of the Rhine, under the command of Jean Victor Moreau. This was his first campaign and he was promoted to brigadier general in recognition of his outstanding achievements at the Battle of Ettlingen. Gazan was wounded on 22 November 1796 and taken to hospital in Strasbourg for his recovery, where he met Marie Madeleine Reiss; after their marriage, she frequently accompanied him on his campaigns and they had several children.

=== Swiss campaign ===
On 4 April 1799, his superior and friend André Masséna transferred him to the Army of the Danube, at that time located in the northeastern Swiss Plateau. There, he took command of a weak (under-manned) brigade at the small town of Winterthur, in northern Switzerland. On 26 May, Michel Ney, the newly appointed general of division, took command of the forward line protecting the main French force at Zürich. The following day, Friedrich, Baron von Hotze, arrived with close to 8,000 battle-hardened and experienced Austrian border troops, including the 12th Infantry Manfredini, a battalion of Hungarian grenadiers, and six squadrons of the Waldeck Dragoons. In the ensuing clash, Ney ordered Gazan's under-manned brigade to the center, where it was soon overwhelmed. In retreat, they safely crossed a bridge spanning a small river, the Töss, but the cavalry guarding the bridge was itself forced back. After stationing his batteries on a slight incline, to protect the retreat from the Austrians, the injured Ney handed command to Gazan, who organized and conducted the successful retreat.

A few days later, at the First Battle of Zürich (4 June 1799), the Austrian force overpowered the French lines. As part of the V. Division of the Army of the Danube, Gazan again commanded the rear guard after Massena's force disengaged from Archduke Charles' army and withdrew across the Limmat river. Later that year, he faced a combined Austrian and Russian force at the Second Battle of Zürich (27 September). His division repulsed Russian outposts at the Limmat river. He subsequently participated in the wild pursuit of the Austrians, resulting in a decisive French victory. He was promoted to division commander and continued in the campaign against Coalition troops in Switzerland.

In 1800, Gazan accompanied the Masséna's Army of Italy, as a general of division in the Corps of Jean-de-Dieu Soult. The 1st Division included the Grenadiers Piedmontais, the 30th Legne (light infantry), and portions of the 2nd, 3rd, and 78th Regiments Ligne (line infantry), totaling approximately 4,500 men. While Soult's Corps campaigned in central northern Italy, Masséna was besieged in Genoa by an Austrian army of 24,000 and a British naval squadron. Soult moved his Corps to the east to relieve Genoa. As part of Soult's Corps, Gazan participated in the battle at Bocchetta Pass (9 April), where he commanded the right wing, and again at the battle of Sassello (10 April). In both clashes, his division was outnumbered nearly three to one took heavy casualties French had heavy casualties. Later in the month, he participated in the clash at Voltri (18 April 1800). To relieve Masséna at Genoa, Soult organized several assaults on strong Austrian positions around the city. At Montecreto (13 May 1800), Gazan's division and the first column of Soult's main force (approximately 5,000 men), attacked a stronger Austrian position of 7,000, under command of Prince Hohenzollern. Soult was taken prisoner, General of Brigade Joseph Perrin was killed, and the cavalry commander, Jean-Joseph Gauthier, was badly wounded. The defeat could be seen from the ramparts at Genoa and caused the French garrison's morale to plummet; many units were already near mutiny and food was scarce. Gazan, who had been wounded, took his troops to Lozano and joined Louis Gabriel Suchet. There he commanded a division of the Army of Italy and fought in a French victory at the battle in Pozzolo (25 December) against the Austrians. He was appointed commander of the First Subdivision of the 27th Military Division in Piedmont. After the peace in 1801, Gazan returned home, but shortly after his return, received a new assignment as commander of a brigade in northern Italy, where he stayed until the declaration of the First French Empire in 1804.

== Service during the Napoleonic Wars ==
=== Dürrenstein and Jena ===
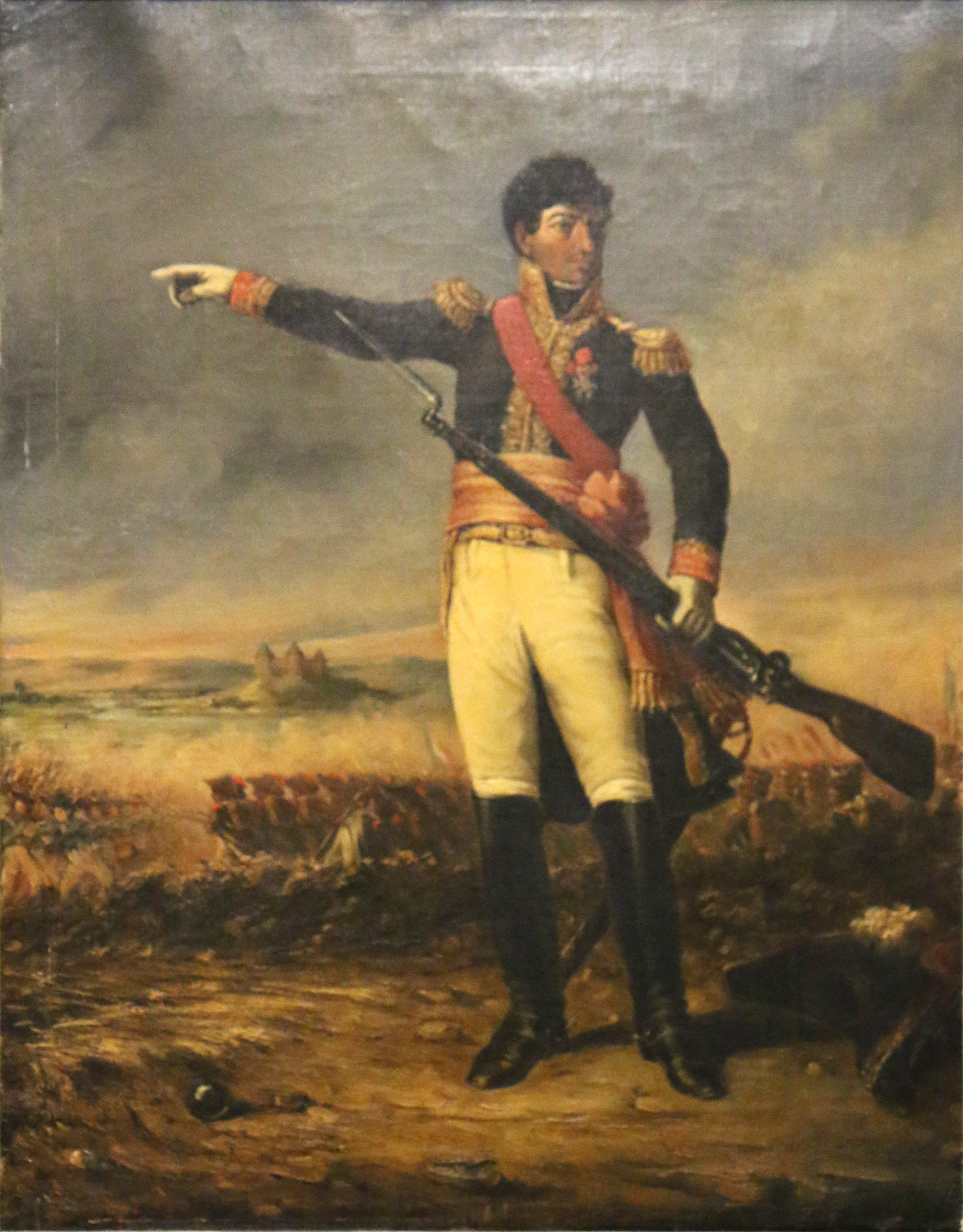
General Gazan at the battle of Dürenstein, 11 November 1805, by Charles Nègre.

In the War of the Third Coalition, Gazan initially was assigned as a division commander of Napoleon's Grande Armée in Lille, in preparation for the planned invasion of England; he remained there until the idea was abandoned. In August 1805, Gazan commanded of a division of the army that encircled Austrians in Ulm. On 11 November, under Marshal Mortier, his division provided the advance guard in the march against Kutuzov's army. As they advanced through a narrow Danube canyon, the division was isolated from the main force, near Dürenstein. By the small village on the Danube, famous as the prison of Richard the Lionhearted at the end of the twelfth century, he and his division were trapped in a narrow canyon, attacked by a Russian force at his rear and more Russians at his front. Gazan's division fought desperately for a harrowing day and suffered 40 percent casualties. He and Mortier were finally rescued by the arrival of the VIII. Corps' 1st Division, commanded by Pierre Dupont de l'Étang, but only after the loss of nearly 4,000 men. In addition, 47 officers and 895 men were captured, and he lost five guns, as well as the eagles of the 4th Infantry Regiment, and the eagle and guidon of the 4th Dragoons. As recognition of his conduct in "the immortal Battle of Dürenstein", he received the Officers Grand Cross of the Legion of Honor and the survivors of his division was sent to Vienna to recuperate. When Austria sued for peace, Gazan's division was sent to Würzburg in Bavaria, where it remained until Prussia declared war in October 1806.

Gazan's division fought in the French victory over Prussia at the Battle of Jena-Auerstedt (14 October 1806). At Ostrolenka (16 February 1807), Gazan's troops took three guns and two Russian colors. Otherwise, his troops stayed in their winter quarters. After the new peace treaty, Gazan's troops were sent to Silesia to restore order. In 1808, he was named Comte de la Peyriére.

=== Early Peninsular War ===
In October 1808, now attached to the VI. Corps, Gazan went to Spain with Jean Lannes and arrived at Zaragoza in December. The city was under siege and defended by Spanish under José de Palafox. Lannes ordered an attack on 22 January 1809 to capture the city in street by street fighting; when the French took a block, sappers tunneled under the houses and blew them up, which prevented Spanish street fighters from slipping into houses behind them. The method was effective but painstaking. Gazan's assignment, to take the well-fortified Jesus Convent. Palafox surrendered on 20 February. The VI. Corps occupied northern Aragon afterward.

In July 1810, Gazan's force guarded the valleys of Extremadura, near Alcantara. In September he fought against Spanish general La Romana. In Fary 1811 he crossed the Sierra Morena to guard the supply On 15–21 March, his 2nd Division of the V. Corps besieged and captured the small fortified town of Campo Maior, in eastern Portugal. There they captured 50 guns and the 100-man Portuguese garrison. As General Latour-Maubourg, four squadrons of dragoons and hussars and three battalions of the 100th Light Infantry moved the cannons to Badajoz the following week, a combined force of the 1st and 7th Portuguese Cavalry and the British 13th Light Dragoons, commanded by Brigadier General Robert Ballard Long, charged and scattered the French 26th Dragoons. In the melee, the drivers of the convoy were cut down, but instead of securing the convoy of guns, the British and Portuguese enthusiastically pursued the fleeing infantry for more than 11 kilometers (6.8 mi); meanwhile, the French sallied out of Badajoz, carefully avoiding the fleeing infantry and its pursuers, and recovered all but one of the guns.

At the Battle of Albuera (16 May 1811), the "bloodiest battle of the Peninsular Campaign," Gazan's division was hammered by the British. The force, composed of two brigades of infantry, one of cavalry and 40 guns, were enveloped by the British on three sides. General of Division Girard's 1st Division was also trapped. The fire-fight wrought massive casualties, and the bodies were reportedly stacked three and four men high; the distinction was in 360 French muskets in deep and narrow columns versus 2000 British flintlocks in a double line of infantry. Only a costly mistake by the British commander, Major General Colborne, prevented a worse disaster for the French. Colborne had deployed his infantry in the standard line, two men deep, and had prepared to fire close range volleys into the French flank. Recognizing the opportunity, Latour-Marbourg's 2nd Hussars and First Vistula Lancers (a Polish unit) to attack the British line before the infantry could form its defensive squares. The French cavalry wrought massive casualties on Colborne's brigade. The 3rd (East Kent) Regiment of Foot ("The Buffs") lost 643 of its 754 men at Albuera, most of them in the initial onslaught of French cavalry. The next two regiments in line lost over 500 men combined and Colborne's brigade lost 1,413 out of its 2,166 men. Despite the mounted assault, however, the French 2nd Division suffered high casualties and lost five colors, a significant blow to its morale and pride.) Gazan was wounded in the battle, and returned to Seville, where he was assigned to a staff position during his recovery.

=== Gazan and the 1813 Peninsular War ===
In June 1813, Gazan was appointed commander of the Joseph Bonaparte's Army of the South. Joseph had established a long defensive line on the heights of Puebla, with the Army of Portugal at the left flank, the Army of the center, commanded by Jean-Baptiste Drouet, Comte d'Erlon and the Army of the South, at the southern flank. On 21 June, Generals Rowland Hill and Pablo Morillo moved toward the south end of the valley; Gazan and d'Erlon asked Jean-Baptiste Jourdan for reinforcements, but the Corps' commander was preoccupied with the possibility of an attack at the opposite flank, and sent none. In their own turn, D'Erlon and Gazan could not agree on how to deal with the approaching threat. In the initial stages of battle, the Army of Portugal started to pull back. Realizing that his southern flank would not hold up in the face of Hill and Morillo, Joseph ordered Gazan to withdraw in ordered masses. Hill and Morillo attacked Gazan's forces with such force that Gazan withdrew.

This was Gazan's last field command. Gazan's pre-emptive withdrawal created a gap in French line, exposing D'Erlon's army in the center. D'Erlon held his position as long as he could, but the line collapsed around him. Joseph's planned orderly withdrawal turned into a rout. Gazan abandoned all his artillery. The Allies captured the entire supply convoy, all the baggage and took many prisoners, including Gazan's wife and children, although they later managed to rejoin him. After losing their supply train, the plight of the French army was terrible. Gazan mentioned that general officers and subordinates alike "were reduced to the clothes on their backs and most of them were barefoot," but the rank and file of the army also suffered enormously from hunger, exposure, and disease. When Soult took command of the new Army of the Pyrenees, Gazan became his chief of staff until Napoleon's abdication.

== Napoleon's return and later life ==
During the Hundred Days, Gazan hesitated but eventually joined Napoleon, with little enthusiasm and he did not receive a field command. After the war, Jean-Baptiste Jourdan persuaded Gazan to be part of the Conseil convened on 9 November 1815 to try Michel Ney for treason. Despite his oath of allegiance to the restored monarchy, the loyal Ney had rallied to Napoleon's banner immediately upon his landing in southern France and had led a corps into battle at Waterloo. King Louis XVIII wished to make a point to Napoleon's former marshals and Ney became the focus of his wrath. Gazan's relationship with Ney had begun in the French Revolutionary Wars shortly after Ney's promotion to general of division. At the Battle of Winterthur (1799), he had been one of Ney's first brigade commanders. Although the King's government may have expected the Conseil to find Ney guilty, the members voted 5–2 to declare themselves incapable of reaching a verdict, and deferred the case to the Chamber of Peers.

Some historians maintain that Ney's death penalty resulted from the military court's refusal to act in the case; only the military court could have returned a verdict of "guilty under exceptional circumstances". Such a verdict would have meant Ney's lifelong incarceration, but would not have required his execution. When the military court refused to reach a verdict, Ney's case went to the Chamber of Peers, which was populated by a mix of old and new peers. The old peers might not have been receptive to Ney's predicament; he had been, after all, a highly visible party to Napoleon's success throughout Europe. If some of the new peers were sympathetic to Ney's situation, they may also have been anxious to prove their own loyalty to the new regime. Ney's penalty was a foregone conclusion.

Despite this, or perhaps because of it, Louis XVIII forced Gazan into retirement in Grasse, where the aging general dabbled unsuccessfully in politics. After the 1830 revolution, the new King of the French Louis Philippe made Gazan a peer of France, and he received a command of a military division in Marseille. By this time, he was an old man, and in poor health, and he retired in June 1832. Gazan de la Peyriére died in Grasse on 9 April 1845.

== See also ==
Names inscribed on the Arc de Triomphe, column 16.
