= Franz Xaver von Auffenberg =

Austrian general (1744–1815)

- Born: 1744; Oettingen, Electorate of Bavaria
- Died: 23 December 1815 (aged 70–71)
- Allegiance: Habsburg Monarchy
- Branch: Imperial Army
- Service years: 1766–1807
- Rank: Feldmarschall-Leutnant
- Conflicts: French Revolutionary Wars; Napoleonic Wars

Franz Xaver Freiherr von Auffenberg (1744 – 23 December 1815) was an Austrian general during the French Revolutionary and Napoleonic Wars.

== Biography ==
Von Auffenberg was born in 1744 in Oettingen, in the Electorate of Bavaria. In 1766 he joined the Imperial Army as a Cadet in the Infantry-Regiment No. 45. He served in this unit until 1788 when he became a Captain in a Serbian Freikorps. Two years later he became a Major on the general staff and in 1791 returned to his old regiment. In 1793 he was made a Lieutenant Colonel in the Infantry-Regiment No. 47, becoming its commander and Colonel in 1794.

For him the War of the First Coalition began in 1793 with the Austrian Netherlands campaign. He was promoted major general in February 1797 for his service at the battle of Würzburg and battle of Wetzlar. During the War of the Second Coalition he commanded a corps in the Swiss Graubünden. On 7 March 1799 he was beaten on the Luziensteig by André Masséna and his force and he was captured the following day when he withdrew to Chur. He then fought alongside the Russians at Saint-Gotthard and Klöntal.

He was freed after the Treaty of Lunéville and rejoined the Austrian army, commanding a force of 5,500 men as a Feldmarschallleutnant during the War of the Third Coalition. From 1803 to 1807 he was owner and honorary colonel of the Infantry Regiment No. 37. At Wertingen on 8 October 1805 he was beaten by French troops under Joachim Murat. His defeat there opened the way to Austria's defeat at Ulm and Austerlitz and so he was court martialled in 1805, placed on the inactive list and dismissed from the army in 1807.

== See also ==
- List of lieutenant field marshals of the Holy Roman Empire

== Bibliography ==
- Finke, Edmund (1896). Geschichte des k. u. k. ungarischen Infanterie-Regimentes Nr. 37 Erzherzog Joseph, Band 1 (in German). Vienna, Austria: St. Norbertus Buch- und Kunstdruckerei. p. 664.
- (in German) Moderne Biographien oder kurze Nachrichten von dem Leben und den Thaten der berühmtesten Menschen, welche sich seit dem Anfange der französischen Revolution bis zu dem Wiener Frieden als Regenten, Feldherrn (etc.) ausgezeichnet haben (etc.) von Karl Reichard, Leipzig, Hammer 1811
- Bibliographical Dictionary of all Austrian Generals during the French Revolutionary and Napoleonic Wars, Leopold Kudrna
