= Wilhelm Derfelden =

Russian general of the cavalry

Wilhelm Christoforovich Derfelden
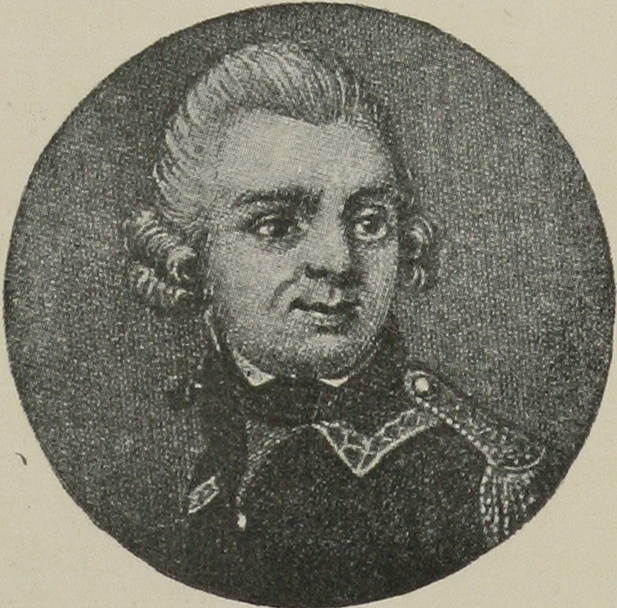
- Born: 1737
- Died: 20 September 1819 (aged 81–82); Kherson, Russia
- Other name: Otto-Wilhelm von Derfelden
- Military career
- Allegiance: (Russia) Russian Empire
- Branch: Cavalry, Infantry
- Service years: 1768–1799
- Rank: General of the Cavalry
- Conflicts: Russo-Turkish War (1768–1774); Russo-Turkish War (1787–1792); Maximeni; Battle of Galatz; Battle of Focsani; Polish–Russian War of 1792; Kamieniec Podolski Castle; Kościuszko Uprising; Pańków; Battle of Chełm; Battle of Praga; War of the Second Coalition; Italy Campaign; Battle of Novi; Switzerland Campaign; Battle of Gotthard Pass; Battle of Klöntal; Battle of Glarus
- Awards: Order of Saint George; Order of Saint Andrew

Otto-Wilhelm von (Note: In German personal names, von is a preposition which approximately means 'of' or 'from' and usually denotes some sort of nobility. While von (always lower case) is part of the family name or territorial designation, not a first or middle name, if the noble is referred to by their last name, use Schiller, Clausewitz or Goethe, not von Schiller, etc.) Derfelden or Wilhelm Christoforovich Derfelden (Russian: Вильгельм Христофорович Дерфельден, romanized: Vil'gel'm Hristoforovič Derfel'den; 1737 – 20 September 1819) was an Imperial Russian General of the Cavalry from a family of Baltic Germans. He fought in the Russo-Turkish War of 1768–1774, Russo-Turkish War of 1787–1792 under Rumyantsev-Zadunaisky, Polish–Russian War of 1792, and Kościuszko Uprising of 1794. In the latter conflict he led troops in the battles of Chełm and Praga. After a period of unemployment, he joined Alexander Suvorov-Rymniksky's army in 1799 as a military mentor to Grand Duke Konstantin Pavlovich of Russia. He subsequently led a corps at Novi, Gotthard Pass, and in Suvorov's Switzerland campaign.

== Biography ==
=== Russo-Turkish wars ===
Suvorov's companion, born in 1733 in Estland and in 1754 entered the Life Guard Horse Regiment as a lieutenant; in 1761 he was promoted to cornet, in 1768 — to cavalry master, and in 1770 transferred to the Tver Carabinier Regiment as colonel, with which he took part in the 1st Turkish War, having proved himself an excellent fighting officer.

Promoted in 1775 to brigadier, in 1777 — to major general, and in 1784 — to lieutenant general, Derfelden with the beginning of the 2nd Turkish War in 1787 received in command of the 4th Division in Rumyantsev's army. In March 1789 Derfelden was entrusted to prevent the concentration of Ottoman forces between the Danube and Prut and to push back the corps of Yakup Pasha on the right bank of the Danube. Derfelden went on a forced march to Birlad and on 27 April at Maximeni decisively defeated Yakub Pasha, taking him prisoner. From Maximeni Derfelden moved towards Galatz, where Ibrahim Pasha with his 20,000-strong corps had taken a well-fortified position. Having reconnoitred it and having made sure that it was impossible to count on the success of a sudden and frontal attack, Derfelden made a flank march, deploying his detachment under the cover of heights perpendicular to the right flank of the Ottoman position. The Turks discovered this manoeuvre only when 3 Russian battalions went on the attack. At their head was Derfelden himself; his horse was killed under him and, falling from it, he badly smashed his face. Seeing the blood on him, the soldiers shouted, "The general is killed." — "No, lads, I am alive, with God onward!" — replied Derfelden, and, rising quickly to his feet, went again at the head of the battalions. Bringing them up to the Turkish artillery battery and noticing a deep ditch, Derfelden ordered them to dismantle the Turkish huts made of planks, and to throw these planks across the ditch, whereby he himself, under the fierce fire of the battery, dragged one large plank and, giving it to the soldiers, said: "Here you guys, forward!". The battery was taken, the redoubt was surrendered after it, and then the main forces of Ibrahim Pasha cleared the position, having lost 1,500 men of lower ranks and officers prisoners, 37 banners/flags and 13 cannons. Derfelden's reward for this victory was the Order of St. George of the 2nd degree.

At Focsani, Derfelden was assigned the task of attacking the Turkish trenches. Bringing his 4 battalions to them without a shot, Defrelden opened heavy fire on them and forced the Turks to clear the trenches and take refuge in the monastery of St. Spyridon, the thick stone walls of which gave them the opportunity to desperately resist. Having destroyed part of the monastery wall with cannonade, Defrelden took the monastery by storm and thus completed the Focsani victory.

=== Russo-Polish wars ===
At the beginning of 1791 Derfelden was forced to leave the army due to illness, and after his recovery he was given the command of the corps in Lithuania, with which he took part in military operations against the Poles and Lithuanians, forcing to surrender the fortress of Kamieniec Podolski. In 1794 campaign in Poland, Derfelden was entrusted by Suvorov with the task of occupying Grodno and, covering the flank and rear of the main army's forces, to distract the Poles. Derfelden took up this task and after occupying Grodno moved to Białystok, and then, according to Suvorov's order, to Warsaw. On the way, at the crossing of the Bug near the village of Pańków, he defeated a detachment of General Mokronowski, who was rushing to the aid of the capital, and, joining Suvorov's troops, took a valiant part in the storming of Praga, for which he was awarded the rank of general-in-chief. Emperor Paul, who favoured Derfelden, summoned him to St. Petersburg (a capital) and appointed him inspector of the cavalry of St. Petersburg and Finland inspections with a re-nomination to general of the cavalry and with the appointment as chief of one of the squadrons of the Horse Guards.

=== Russo-French war ===
In 1797 Derfelden was awarded the Order of St. Andrew, but soon after he was dismissed from the service and re-entered it in 1799, with the commission to accompany Grand Duke Konstantin Pavlovich to Suvorov's Italian army and to have the closest care of him there. Moreover, Derfelden was intended to take the place of Suvorov himself, if the latter "had any misfortune"; Suvorov was offered to replace Derfelden with General Rosenberg, in whose abilities Emperor Paul badly believed. However, Suvorov did not find it possible to do this immediately, although he was very pleased with the arrival of Derfelden, whom he highly appreciated, (It is reported that after the Rymnik victory Suvorov said to those who congratulated him on the brilliant success: "Honour not to me, but to Wilhelm Christoforovich; I am his student, because he defeated the Turks at Maximeni and Galatz showing how to warn the enemy"). When new troops arrived in the theatre of war (Rehbinder's corps), Suvorov subordinated them to Rosenberg, and the latter's corps (more powerful) entrusted to Derfelden, which spun with him to participate in the battle of Novi, and then in the heavy Swiss campaign.

At the famous military council in the Muttental, Derfelden, universally respected for his fighting and personal qualities, had to speak on behalf of all his comrades in response to Suvorov's words. With soulfulness and conciseness, always delighted Suvorov, he said that everyone knows what a difficult feat they will have to do, but he, Suvorov, knows how the troops are devoted to him, and therefore they will bear everything, will not shame the Russian name and if not defeat the enemy, then lay down their bones. Suvorov was touched by Derfelden's speech, and "moral connection between the troops and the leader was bonded and certified for life and death" (A. F. Petrushevsky). For the Swiss campaign Derfelden was awarded the Grand Cross of the Order of St. John of Jerusalem. Returning to Russia, Derfelden retired and died in 1819.
