= Suvorov Crossing the Alps =

Suvorov Crossing the Alps, Suvorov's March across the Alps, and other similar titles may refer to the following works of art, commemorating Suvorov's Swiss campaign.

- Suvorov crossing the Alps, an 1899 painting by Vasily Surikov
- A mosaic on the facade of the Suvorov Museum in Saint Petersburg
