= Maxim Rehbinder =

Russian military commander

Maxim Vasilyevich Rehbinder
- Максимъ Васильевичъ Ребиндеръ (Note: Pre-1918 Russian orthography)
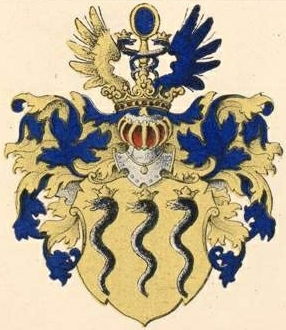
- Coat of Arms of the Rehbinder family
- Born: 1730
- Died: February 22, 1804 (Note: O.S. Feb. 10, 1804)
- Relatives: House of Rehbinder
- Military career
- Allegiance: Russia
- Branch: Imperial Russian Army
- Rank: General-Major
- Conflicts: Russo-Turkish wars; Sheikh Mansur Movement; Battle of Jilehoy; War of the Second Coalition; Suvorov's Italian campaign; Battle of Novi; Combat of Gavi; Suvorov's Swiss campaign; Saint-Gotthard; Battle of Oberalpsee; Battle of Devil's Bridge; Battle of Muottental

Maxim Vasilyevich (Note: "Vladimirovich" (Russian: Владимирович) occurs in a 2017 biographical dictionary.) Rehbinder (Russian: Максим Васильевич Ребиндер, romanized: Maksim Vasil'yevich Rebinder; 1730 – 22 February 1804) was an associate of Suvorov.

== Biography ==
His dynasty originated in Westphalia. He entered the military service in 1750. During the Russo-Turkish wars, he was in the Azov Musketeer Regiment and became famous for his fearlessness; in 1787, in the rank of colonel, he was in the hostilities behind the Kuban and on 1 October (Note: All dates in the text are in New Style) 1787 was the first to reach the enemy camp; Sheikh Mansur, having lost many troops, was forced to retreat, and the Russian troops in less than two weeks, cleared from the rebellious Tatars the whole country from the mouth of the Laba River up the Kuban to the snowy mountains. Through this campaign Rehbinder gained a loud fame and was awarded the rank of major-general. Then he participated in Suvorov's Italian campaign, took part in the battle of Novi (15 August 1799) and on 17 August was in the combat of Gavi, — a hot and successful for the Russians rearguard action against the French. At the time of Suvorov's entry into Switzerland Rehbinder marched at the head of Andrei Rosenberg's column, sent to bypass Gudin, occupying the mountain Saint-Gotthard; he attacked his enemy, who ran to his reserve, located in the Reuss Valley. Rehbinder descended from the mountains with all possible quiet and lined up below for battle. After a successful descent the Russian troops, with a cry of Hurrah! went to the bayonets. The French at first stood firm, but were forced to retreat step by step and left 5 cannon on the battlefield. September 25, he participated in Suvorov's attack on the terrible cramp of Devil's Bridge. Suvorov, persons whom he loved, respected, valued,—usually called not by family name, but by first name. Such persons were not many, and among them belonged Rehbinder. When the Russian troops' reaching Altdorf, Suvorov decided to turn toward Mutten valley and from there to Graubünden. The leaders of the advanced vanguard were appointed M. A. Miloradovich and M. V. Rehbinder. Suvorov, appointing them to this dangerous place, exclaimed: "Mikhailo, you in front — facing the enemy, and to you, Maksim, — glory!".

On 30 September, when they had to descend into Mutten valley under the bullets of his enemies' soldiers, Rehbinder went around the troops, animated them and ordered: "beat the enemy and beat bravely, together and briskly; shoot aptly, their raids on the bayonet!". Rehbinder with his regiment was ahead of Miloradovich's regiment. In this battle there were many killed both on the Russian side and on the French, but the Russians captured up to 2,000 men and got 5 cannon.

Rehbinder was very caring of his soldiers. Thus, in Glarus Russian troops arrived in a terrible situation, and Rehbinder went around his soldiers in hessians without soles: gray-haired, almost 70-year-old man, not having rested himself, hurried to inspect his troops, congratulate them on their arrival and say comfort. For this caring attitude, the soldiers loved their chief and said:

"Rehbinder is a father, not a chief, a brave of the brave, a strongman, a lion, he will not chicken out!".

== Sources ==
- Polovtsov, Alexander (1910). Russian Biographical Dictionary. Vol. 15: Притвиц – Рейс. St. Petersburg: Типография Императорской Академии Наук. pp. 526, 527–528.
- Arsenyev, Konstantin; Petrushevsky, Fedor (1899). Brockhaus and Efron Encyclopedic Dictionary (in Russian). Vol. 51: Рабочая книжка – Резолюция. Friedrich A. Brockhaus (Leipzig), Ilya A. Efron (St. Petersburg). p. 414.
- Leer, G. A. [in Russian] (1893). Энциклопедия военных и морских наук [Encyclopedia of Military and Marine Sciences] (in Russian). Vol. 6. St. Petersburg: Типография В. Безобразова и Комп. pp. 266–267.
- Bogdanovich, Modest (1856). Военный энциклопедический лексикон [Military encyclopedic lexicon]. Vol. 11 (2nd ed.). St. Petersburg: Типография Главного Штаба Его Императорского Величества По Военно-Учебным Заведениям. pp. 109–111.
- Ребиндер Максим Владимирович // Биографический словарь. Высшие чины Российской Империи (22.10.1721 – 2.03.1917) / Comp. by E. L. Potemkin. – Moscow, 2017. – Vol. III: Р–Я. – p. 21.
