= Battle of Jilehoy =

Battle of the Urup River
- Part of Anapa campaign (1787), Sheikh Mansur movement, and Russo-Circassian War
Date	21–22 September, 1787
Location	Urup River, Circassia
Result	Russian victory

Belligerents
Russian Empire	Sheikh Mansur movement; Circassians; Abazins; Nogais

Commanders and leaders
(Russian Empire) Maxim Rebinder (Russian Empire) General Palakin (Russian Empire) General Radyev	Sheikh Mansur

Strength
18,000	10,000–11,000

Casualties and losses
Unknown	Heavy

The Battle of the Urup River, also known as the Battle of Jilehoy, was a confrontation between Russian troops led by General Maxim Rebinder and Circassian, Abazin and Nogai fighters led by Sheikh Mansur. Although victorious at first, after the arrival of Russian reinforcements, Mansur and his fighters were forced to retreat.

== Battle ==
The Russians decided to make a grand attack in 1787. This resulted in the Battle of Jilehoy. At first, the Russians were losing, but they won after additional forces arrived. After winning the battle, the Russian army raided the Abaza, Besleney, Chemguy and Hatuqay regions and burned near a hundred villages. In 1788, the Russians besieged the Bighurqale (Anapa) castle, but failed.
