= Combat of Gavi (1799) =

1799 battle of the Second Coalition war

- Part of the Italian campaigns during the war of the Second Coalition
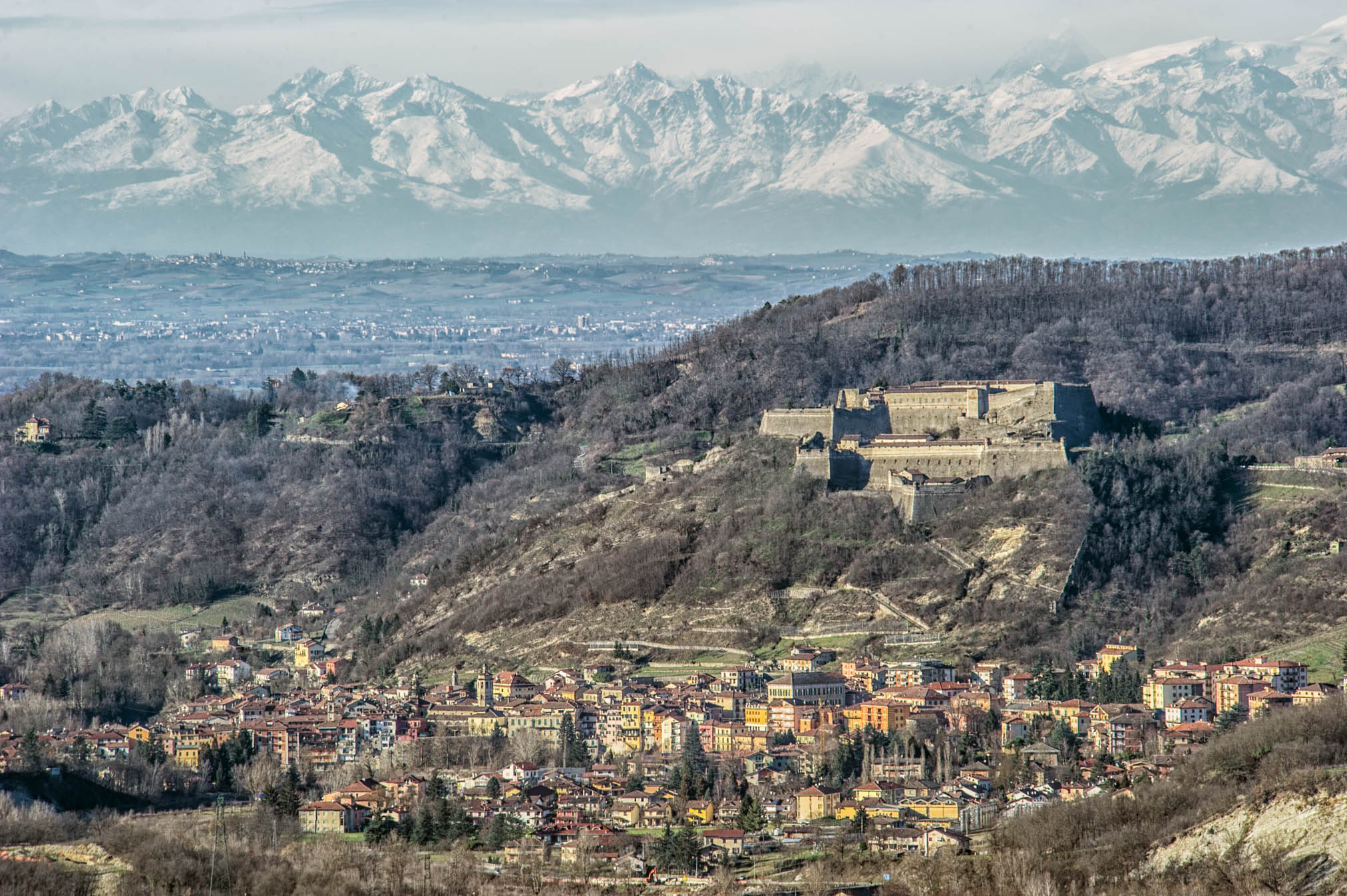
- Gavi – panorama
Date	17 August 1799
Location	Gavi, Piedmont, Northern Italy
Result	Russian victory (Note: Tactical success)

Belligerents
Russian Empire	(French First Republic) French Republic

Commanders and leaders
(Russian Empire) Andrei Rosenberg (Russian Empire) Maxim Rehbinder	

Casualties and losses
5 killed, 17 wounded	Heavy, incl. 130 captured

The combat of Gavi was fought to no strategic avail on the morning of 17 August (O.S. 6 Aug.) 1799 during the Second Coalition war, in pursuit of the defeated French army after the battle of Novi. The combat included Rosenberg's Russian vanguard, under Rehbinder's command. In the combat, the Russians managed to push the French back towards Gavi.

== Action development ==
Before reaching Gavi, Kashkin's Russian jaegers overtook the French rearguard in a strong position between two mountains. Following the jaegers, Rehbinder advanced his regiment and Foertsch's battalion. After a brief skirmish, the Russians struck at bayonets and drove the French from their position and chased them without giving them a rest. Several hundred Republicans lay down on the spot; up to 130 were captured by the Russians. On the Russian side the loss did not exceed 5 killed and 17 wounded.

But here the Russian vanguard received orders to halt, and to send some light troops after the French. The French rearguard held out at Gavi.

== Sources ==
- Milyutin, Dmitry (1852). История войны России с Францией в царствование Императора Павла I в 1799 году [The history of Russia's war with France during the reign of Emperor Paul I in 1799] (in Russian). Vol. III. St. Petersburg: Типография штаба военно-учебных заведений. p. 75.
- Orlov, Nikolay Aleksandrovich (1892). Разбор военных действий Суворова в Италии в 1799 году [Analysis of Suvorov's military actions in Italy in 1799] (in Russian). St. Petersburg: Тип. Тренке и Фюсно. p. 308. ISBN 9785998994289.
