= Battle of Muottental =

War of the Second Coalition battle, 1799

Battle of the Muottental
- Part of Suvorov's Swiss campaign in the War of the Second Coalition
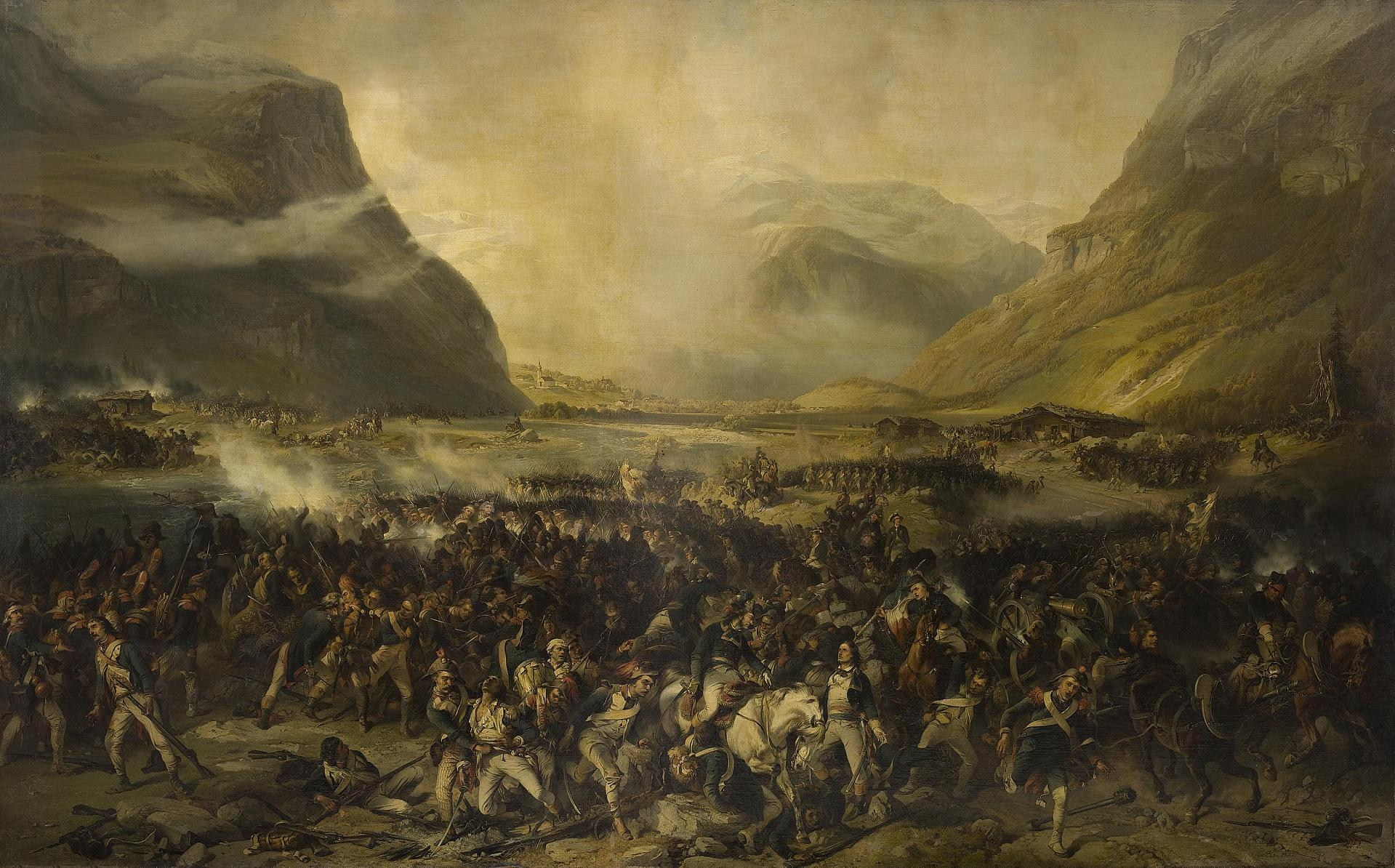
- Battle at Mutten Valley by Alexander Kotzebue
Date	30 September – 1 October 1799 (O.S. — 19–20 September)
Location	Muottental/Muotta, Canton of Waldstätten, Helvetic Republic 46°58′28″N 8°45′32″E
Result	Russian victory

Belligerents
France	Russia

Commanders and leaders
André Masséna; Jean-de-Dieu Soult (Note: Not directly involved. Fought at Glarus.); Édouard Mortier	Alexander Suvorov; Andrei Rosenberg; Ivan Sabaneev (WIA); Maxim Rehbinder; Mikhail Veletsky; Mikhail Miloradovich

Strength
10,000–15,000 (Note: According to the Russian similar to Clodfelter estimate (15,000), — Bogdanovich's, — 15,000 to 16,000. Gaston Bodart, noting only October 1, gave a figure of 9,000 French. On September 30, during the intensified reconnaissance of the French, Rehbinder's advance guard was not quickly supported by Rosenberg; it was said that the reason for this was Rosenberg's personal dislike of Rehbinder. 11,064+ in total, considering the losses on 25–26 September at Zurich and on 30 September in the Muottental (per Reding-Biberegg). Probably 9,000–10,000 were on site.): ~8,000 on the 1st day (Note: 8,500 as per Reding-Biberegg)	7,000 at the end (Note: 8–9,000 in total (inclusive of uninvolved reserves), given the losses at the St. Gotthard, on the marches, and stragglers (per Reding-Biberegg). 7,000 towards the end of battle, if deduct the wastage since the campaign's start, Tyrtov's regiment and other elements of Förster's division which were still descending from Hürital region.) (regulars and Cossacks): 4,000 on the 1st day (Note: See prelude to the battle 5,500 as per Reding-Biberegg)

Casualties and losses
2,700 to 3,000 (Note: The French losses on 1 October (the battle went on for two days) were very considerable. Jomini defines them: 5 cannons, 1,000 captured, 1,000 killed and wounded. Rosenberg in his report to Suvorov, sent immediately after the battle, says that the Russians captured 1 general, 2 colonels, 10 officers and more than 1,000 non-commissioned officers and privates, as well as captured 5 cannons; killed and the overall death toll — 1 general and more than 6,000 (!) French. Suvorov reported to Emperor Paul that the French lost: killed and wounded 3,000, drowned 500, blown off the rocks 200, prisoners — 1 general (Suvorov mistakenly calls it Lecourbe, in fact it was the head of the 108th Demi-Brigade Lacourt), 1 battalion commander, 10 officers and 1,200 lower ranks. In the monastery's minutes says: "the Russians brought many prisoners, namely, one general, his adjutant, one battalion commander with an adjutant, several captains and lieutenants, a total of 10 officers and about 1,500–1,600 lower ranks". Russian historian Petrushevsky stated that the losses should be looked for in the range of 3 to 4,000 men.); 1 howitzer, 5 cannons	~1,000–1,100 (Note: Losses are down to 500 if counting only the 1st of October — as per Bodart. The loss of the Russians on 1 October should have been considerably less than the French. In Mortier's report to Soult, more than 500 Russian men were killed on 30 September and 1 October. On the 1 October evening, with the help of local residents, the wounded were picked up and placed in the monastery and peasant yards. The monastery itself, which was not particularly spacious, housed: 2 French and 11 Russian officers, 50 French and 342 Russian soldiers. Milyutin notes that Rosenberg left around 600 wounded at the Muottental. The monastery minutes state that the Russians themselves determined their wounded at 500–600 men.)

The Battle of (the) Muottental (Note: Russian: Сражение в Мутенской долине, German: Schlacht im Muotatal; also known as the battle of (the) Muttental, Muottatal, Muotatal, Muotathal, Muota/Mutten/Muotta/Muotten valley or Muotta/Muota river.) was fought in 1799, on 30 September and 1 October, during the Second Coalition war as part of Suvorov's Swiss campaign. The Russian troops of Rosenberg's rearguard, ordered by Suvorov, stood in the choke point of Muottental (a narrow valley, also referred to as the Muttental), now Muotatal, covering the march of the main force, and were attacked by a larger French army under the overall command of Masséna. French troops were more than double that of the Russian forces, according to some statements. It ended in a decisive Russian victory.

The Russians' numerical inferiority was compensated by the battlefield that Suvorov had chosen: the Muottental was narrow enough that the French were unable to fully deploy their forces; while at the point of engagement there was high ground on both flanks (which was steep and heavily wooded on the right), as well as a pronounced bend in the Muota and the bushy-banked Rambach stream transversely that were ahead of the defenders and disadvantageous for the attackers. This allowed Rosenberg, having discovered and occupied the said point of engagement, to take a favorable disposition for his troops, with skirmishers ahead of all other troops, Cossack cavalry on each flank, able to dismount, and line infantry in the center, whilst another line of infantry was held in reserve to support any section in case of a breakthrough. Masséna's French were unable to outflank these forces and, accordingly, could not effectively use their superiority in numbers. The Russian historian Petrushevsky praised Rosenberg's conduct in this battle, noting that the general had chosen an "excellent disposition" and personally rode in the front ranks of his troops. The Muottental battle has analogies with the famous ancient Battle of Thermopylae.

== Prelude to the battle ==
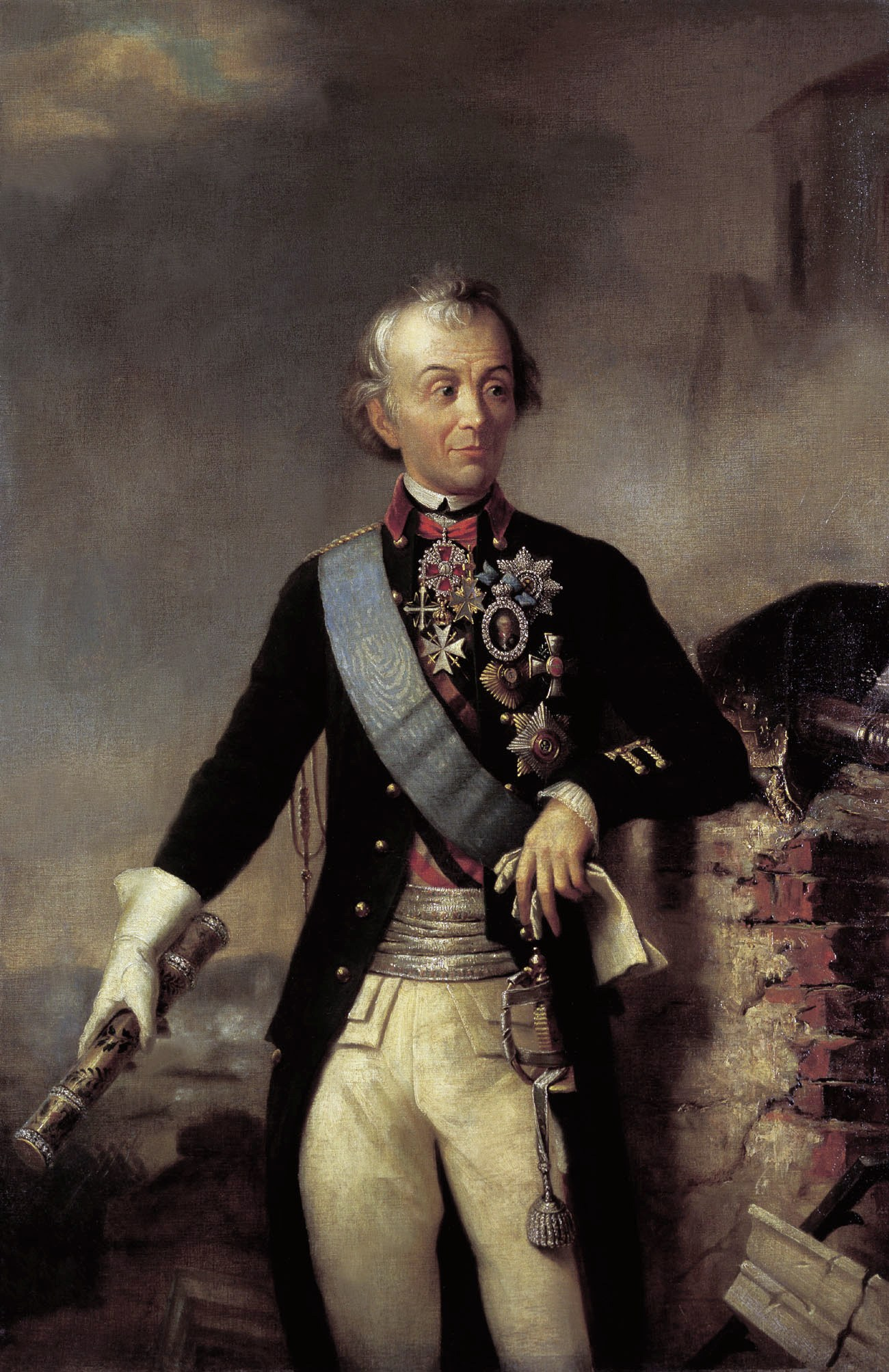
Suvorov with a baton of field marshal

Suvorov's disposition of troops instructed Rosenberg's corps to remain in the rearguard and hold the enemy from Schwyz until all the packs had passed over Mount Bragell (now Pragel). Rosenberg was ordered to hold firm, to repel the French with all his strength, but not to pursue them beyond Schwyz.

While half of the Russian troops were thus making their way out of the Muottental, the other half remained near Mutten (now Muotathal), securing the movement of the former from the rear. Rosenberg's main force was encamped near the village, the vanguard was in front of the Franciscan monastery, and the advanced posts were still a kilometre a half ahead. In all there were 4,000 men in formation, counting also the dismounted Cossacks; three regiments of the rearguard were still on their way through the Rossstock ridge, as the packs were still being pulled along the mountain path. The French in Schwyz were twice as strong and were waiting for new reinforcements; Masséna arrived from Altorf on the 30th and gave all the orders himself. He did not know and could not know where exactly the small Russian army was; the day before he could only ascertain that the Russians had left Altorf for the Muottental. Masséna decided to make a reconnaissance without delay and to base his further course of action on the information obtained.

== Battle ==
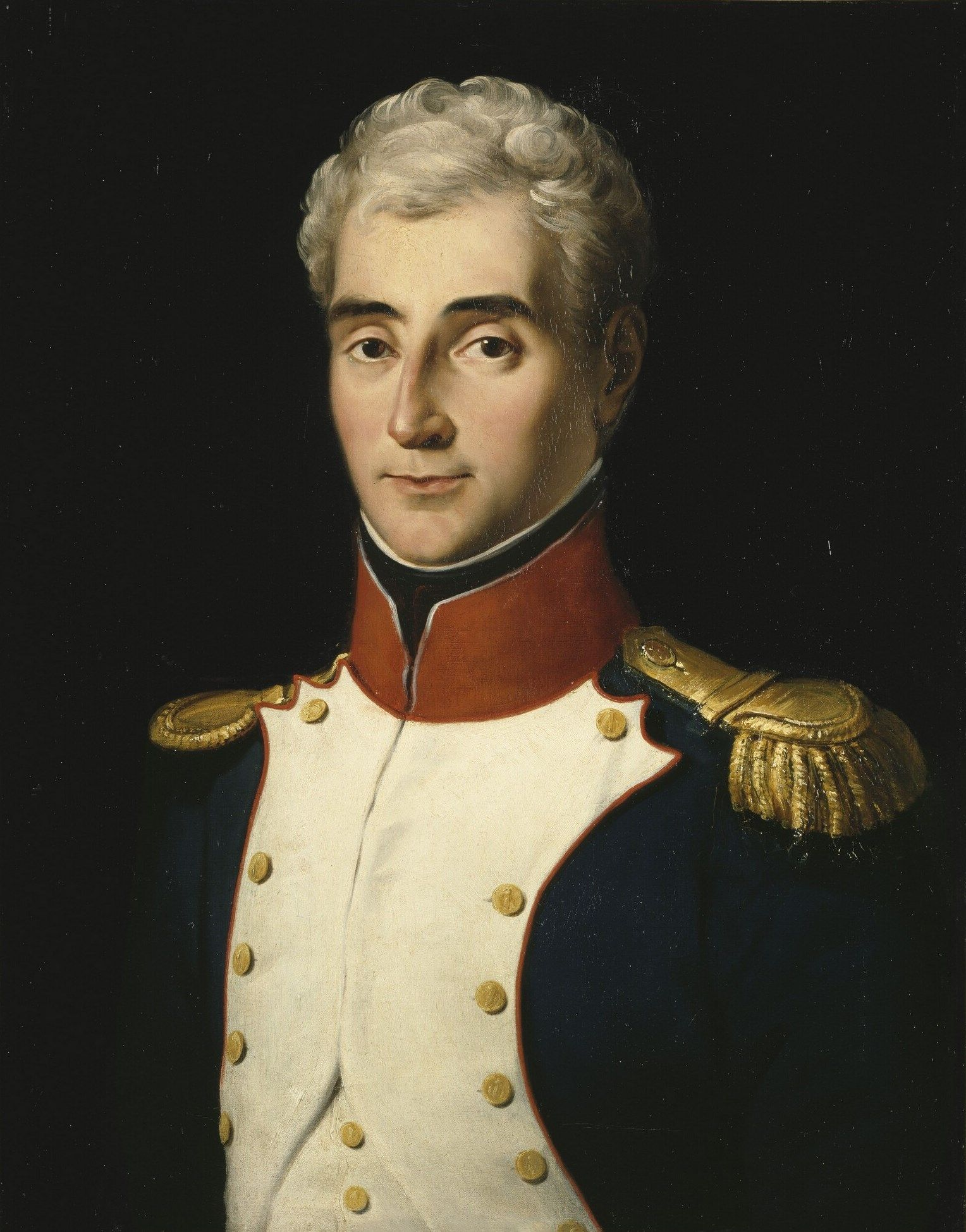
Général de division Masséna

=== 30 September ===
Suvorov chose to deploy Rosenberg's small force for defense in the Muottental valley, it is surrounded by mountains, which is convenient to defend with his lesser than French forces, as Masséna would not be able to effectively use a flanking movement because of the highland area bordering both flanks. How tactically well Rosenberg would position the troops on the field depended on him. As mentioned, Rosenberg was given instructions not to pursue the French beyond Schwyz in case of success and use all available forces.

About 2 o'clock in the afternoon the French columns of Brigadier General Éduard Mortier's 108th Demi-Brigade, preceded by a dense chain of chasseurs, appeared in front of the Russian advance troops consisting of jaeger battalion (which belonged to the Kashkin jaeger regiment) and Cossack sotnia – both were brought by Major Ivan Sabaneev – and drove them back. Mortier's division was coordinated by General Jean-de-Dieu Soult. Sabaneev’s units joined Rosenberg's vanguard of Lieutenant General Maxim Rehbinder (while Sabaneev himself was badly wounded). The van, consisting of Rehbinder's own musketeer regiment, a further battalion of Kashkin jaegers, and Pozdneev and Kurnakov dismounted Cossack regiments, several times went into bayonet combat, but each time was repulsed and lost one cannon, however, seized it again and also captured a French howitzer. Two hours later, reinforcements from Rosenberg's main forces appeared and together with the vanguard attacked the French, who retreated and, threatened on both flanks by two dismounted Cossack regiments, retreated all the way to Schwyz with a significant loss. The purpose of the intensified reconnaissance was achieved: Masséna could determine approximately the Russian forces remaining at Mutten, and made sure that Suvorov with most of his troops had moved on. The Russians believed, as it often happens, that they had repelled a real attack, and in the report of Rosenberg and then Suvorov, the meeting with the French on the 30th took on the meaning of a persistent cause and a victory over a strong enemy, which in reality happened only on the next day.

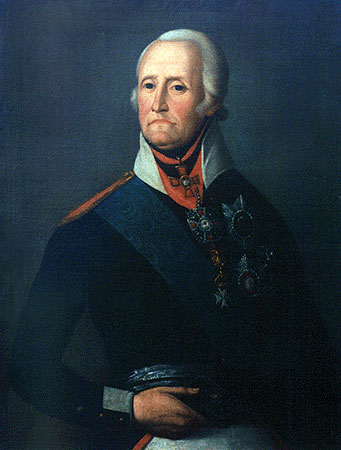
General of the Infantry Rosenberg

=== 1 October ===
By nightfall, the rest of the packs that had travelled from the Schächental over the Rossstock ridge had arrived in Mutten, followed by the rearguard, which also descended from the pass. Thus Rosenberg's forces increased to about 7,000 men, but Masséna also received reinforcements, so that in Schwyz no less than 10,000 men were concentrated. The night and morning passed quietly; the Russians did not expect another attack at all, under the influence of yesterday's affair, taken as a victory. Meanwhile a decisive blow was being prepared. Three French columns with artillery and chasseurs appeared on both sides of the river, and made a vigorous and determined attack; chains of chasseurs stretched behind their flanks, occupying the mountains' slopes. The advanced posts of the Russians retreated, the vanguard was ordered to draw back without making a serious engagement; this it executed, only at times giving the French chain a repulse by sudden blows, and from the chain of Russian light infantry (jaegers) the brave men beleaguered the enemy's raiders with their bayonets. The service of the posts and van was now effectively under Major General Mikhail Veletsky. In the meantime Rosenberg had moved his main forces a few hundred paces forward and stretched them out in two lines across the valley, while the retreating vanguard was ordered, on approaching the first line, to give out to the right and left and to withdraw rapidly to the flanks. The manoeuvre was executed quite well, and the French columns suddenly found themselves in front of a formidable formation occupying the entire width of the valley. Miloradovich regiment was dispersed along the front in skirmish order, while Kashkin jaeger and Rehbinder regiment formed the first line behind. The Don Cossacks extended the two flanks to the heights on either side: Major General Semyon Kurnakov's 2 regiments on the right and Denisov Cossacks on the left. The second line composed of Mansurov and Foertsch infantry regiments covered by mountain guns. The French artillery under Mortier opened fire, the French infantry began to deploy in line, continuing the attack with drumming and music; Denisov Cossacks were suffering losses from gunshots but stood their position. The Russian first line, having let the French come within rifle-shot, gave a volley and at once, with a shout of ура (ura; hurrah; hurray), rushed into the attack. Based on the Russian eyewitness Yakov Starkov^{[ru]} the stunned French did not go either backwards or forwards for about a minute, and then opened rapid fire with rifles and cannon. Rosenberg brought second line forward. The power of the more numerous French guns against the Russian 2-pounders made itself felt, but that Russian onslaught was done with might and main. Russian third attack was aided by Veletsky musketeers from the reserve and worked their way around to the French flanks unnoticed by Mortier in the smoke.

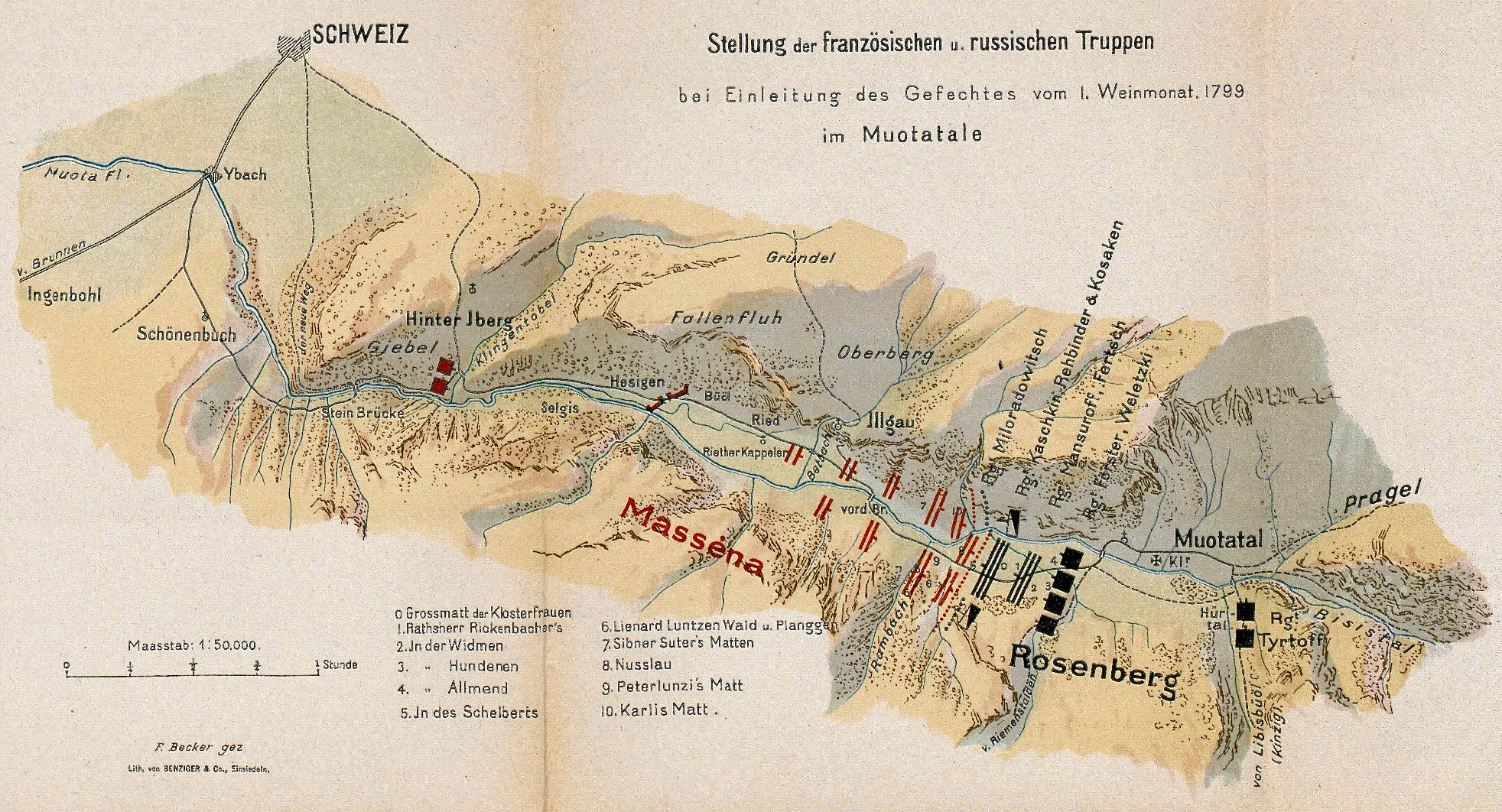
F. Becker & Rudolf von Reding-Biberegg, Battle in the Muotatal on 1 October 1799

The French were stunned, and began to pause, falter, and in some places open a rapid fire; but the Russian battalions were approaching so swiftly and formidably that not a moment could be lost. The hesitation did not last long: the centre of the French trembled; the 108th began a staged retreat by companies without waiting for a blow; the flank columns, weaker in numbers, followed suit—67th began to disintegrate. The Russians continued the advance furiously, and reached such a degree of excitement that some battalions of the second line outpaced the first in order to reach the French. Canister shots allowed the French to disengage for a valuable moments, while party of the 1st dragoons covered Mortier's exposed left. An overturned caisson blocked the road by which the French artillery was retreating; in the sickening turmoil they had no time to clear it in time, and 5 cannons fell to the Russians. An eyewitness says that it is difficult to imagine what panic the French were in; they lost all presence of mind and fled without looking back in mortal terror. The tactical reversal turned into a massacre. Their rearguard stopped to fight back at the gorge's mouth, in a very strong position, reinforced in advance by fortifications, but attacked from the front and outflanked from the flank, did not stand and fled. On the bridge across the Muotta river (now Muota), where the fugitives were piled up, the rearguard again tried to stop the stormy pursuit, but again without any success, and paid here with two more cannons, which were immediately turned against the fugitives and escorted their crowds with French cannonballs. The difficulty of the pursuit was for the Russians only to catch up with the fugitives, for which they lacked strength, as the flight was so hurried and disorderly. Where the French could be overtaken, they were cut down and stabbed almost unmercifully; the prisoners of war surrendered in "droves". The head of the 108th Demi-Brigade Adjutant General Nicolas Lacourt, a senior staff officer of Mortier, was captured by Denisov. In his old age, Suvorov confused him with Claude Lecourbe in a letter to Paul. The following controversial episode also occurred. Sergeant Makhotin with his comrades reached the French officer and dragged him off his horse, nearly capturing. Another French officer rushed to the aid from behind, and Makhotin had to let go back, but Makhotin found that he was still holding one of officer's epaulettes. He put it in his knapsack and later presented to Suvorov. The Russians imagined that it belonged to Masséna himself, but it probably belonged to his aide-de-camp Honoré Reille, who was almost captured. This defeat was so complete, and the French were so disordered, that they began to organise themselves only behind Schwyz, and the Russian troops stopped their pursuit only at the exit from the gorge; the advanced detachments reached Schwyz and Brunnen, occupying the latter.

== Summation ==
Thus battle ended, which constitutes a tactical victory for Russian army. Rosenberg's corps fulfilled its objective on the 1st of October and not only fulfilled its difficult task successfully, but did more than Suvorov himself had expected. The whole course of this battle involving heavy casualties was as if it took place in the presence and under the direction of Suvorov; the troops fought with an intense fighting. LTG Rehbinder and MG Miloradovich were the acting heroes of the day; unnoticed, as if disappearing in the presence of other Suvorov's associates, Rosenberg proved his right to a place in their fellow commanders. Rosenberg did not enjoy the same affection of the troops as the others, he was a general of a special category and school, and was disliked by Suvorov; but historical records suggest some criticisms against him are unverified. Rosenberg behaved impeccably: took an excellent disposition, travelled along the troop front, encouraged his soldiers, ordered not to waste time on an empty firefight, and fight in Suvorov's way, using the bayonet. There is a contemporary record, claiming that 1 October reconciled Suvorov with Rosenberg and corrected their mutual relations.

The French suffered huge losses here, the exact total of which is difficult to determine because of the variability of information, but it must be sought between the limits of 3–4,000 men. More than 1,000 prisoners alone were taken, including a general and 15 officers. The loss of the Russians is nowhere shown; from the course of the affair it is evident that it must be incomparably lower than that of the French. The villagers and Cossacks all night and next morning picked up the wounded, carried them to a large stone house at Mutten, and dug graves for the dead. The cannons taken from the French were riveted and buried in the ground. The Frenchmen who had been killed had not a few things to eat: vodka and wine in small flat jars, cheese, bread, breadcrumbs, etc.; few of them had no money or valuables; all this, of course, had been robbed by the Russians. Besides, not far from Schwyz, in the woods, the Cossacks found several sacks of rice, cheese, sausages, and other supplies, — probably the sutlers' supplies, abandoned in the hasty flight. The vanguard, having thus obtained the booty, obtained a hot meal the same evening by cooking a stew of various foods in water-bearing canteens.

Rosenberg set out in the morning, and although the French chased him across the Muottental to Mount Bragell, they could not catch up even with the rearguard. Beaten Masséna left a few battalions in the Muottental, and the rest of his troops took a circuitous route through Einsiedeln to join Gabriel Molitor. Subsequently, in 1807, talking to a Russian general, Masséna remembered Suvorov, praised his military abilities and said that he would never forgive him for the crossing won by him in Switzerland.

== See also ==
- Battle of Cassano
- First Battle of Marengo
- Battle of the Trebbia
- Battle of Novi
- Battle of the Gotthard Pass
- Battle of Devil's Bridge
- Battle of the Klöntal
- Battle of Näfels

== Sources ==
- Clodfelter, M. (2017). Warfare and Armed Conflicts: A Statistical Encyclopedia of Casualty and Other Figures, 1492-2015 (4th ed.). Jefferson, North Carolina: McFarland. ISBN 978-0-7864-7470-7.
- Duffy, Christopher (1999). Eagles Over the Alps: Suvorov in Italy and Switzerland, 1799. Chicago, Illinois: The Emperor's Press. ISBN 978-1883476182.
- Broughton, Tony (June 2001). "French Infantry Regiments and the Colonels who Led Them: 1791 to 1815. 31st - 40th Regiments". napoleon-series.org. The Napoleon Series.
- Bodart, Gaston (1908). Militär-historisches Kriegs-Lexikon (1618-1905). Vienna and Leipzig: C. W. Stern.
- Reding-Biberegg, Rudolf von (1895). Der Zug Suworoff's durch die Schweiz. 24. Herbst- bis 10. Weinmonat 1799 [The Suvorov's move across Switzerland. 24 September to 10 October 1799]. Zürich: Hans von Matt, Stans.
  - Reding-Biberegg, Rudolf von (1902). Поход Суворова через Швейцарию 24 Сентября – 10 Октября 1799 года [Suvorov’s campaign through Switzerland on September 24 – October 10, 1799]. Translated by Martynov, Yevgeny [in Russian]. St. Petersburg: Т-во Художественной Печати.
- Hartmann, Otto (1892). Der Antheil der Russen am Feldzug von 1799 in der Schweiz. Ein Betrag zur Geschichte dieses Feldzugs und zur Kritik seiner Geschichtschreiber [The participation of the Russians in the 1799 campaign in Switzerland. A contribution to the history of this campaign and the criticism of its historians]. Zürich: A. Munk.
- Hüffer, Hermann (1900). "Die Schlacht an der Suworow-Brücke im Muotathal am 1. Oktober 1799 und der Generaladjutant Lacour" [The Battle of the Suvorov Bridge in Muotathal on 1 October 1799 and the Adjutant General Lacour]. Mitteilungen des Instituts für Österreichische Geschichtsforschung. 21. Innsbruck: Verlag der Wagner'schen Universitäts-Buchhandlung: 338–343.
- Petrushevsky, Alexander (1884). "Швейцарская кампания: Муттенталь, Кленталь, Рингенкопф; 1799" [Swiss Campaign: Muttental, Klöntal, Ringenkopf]. Генералиссимус князь Суворов [Generalissimo Prince Suvorov] (in Russian). Vol. 3 (1st ed.). Saint Petersburg: Типография М. М. Стасюлевича. pp. 262–271.
- Rostunov, Ivan I. (1989). Генералиссимус Александр Васильевич Суворов: Жизнь и полководческая деятельность [Generalissimo Alexander Suvorov: Life and military activity]. Moscow: Voenizdat. ISBN 5-203-00046-8.
- Bogdanovich, Modest (1846). "Движение Суворова к Гларусу" [Suvorov's move to Glarus]. Походы Суворова в Италии и Швейцарии [The campaigns of Suvorov in Italy and Switzerland]. St. Petersburg: Военная типография.
- Starkov, Yakov (1847). Рассказы старого воина о Суворове [Stories of an old warrior about Suvorov]. Moscow: Университетская типография.
- Mathiez, Albert; Lefebvre, Georges (1992). La rivoluzione francese. Vol. 2. Giulio Einaudi.

Preceded by Second Battle of Zurich	French Revolution: Revolutionary campaigns Battle of Muottental (1799)	Succeeded by Battle of Alkmaar (1799)
