= Andrei Rosenberg =

Russian general of the infantry

Andrei Grigoryevich Rosenberg
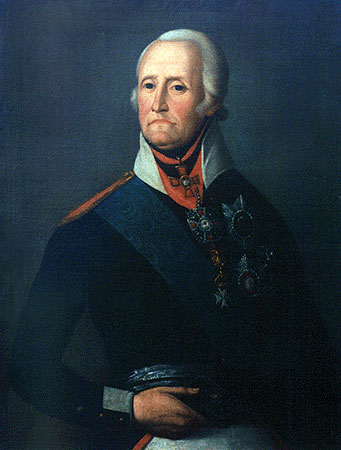
- Born: 1739; Courland Governorate
- Died: 7 September 1813 (aged 73–74) (Note: Old Style 25 Aug. 1813); Eldership of Chyornoye, 32 km from Kamenets-Podolsky
- Other names: Andrey Grigorevich; Diederich Arend von
- Military career
- Allegiance: Russian Empire; Imperial Russian Army
- Branch: The Infantry
- Service years: 1753–1805
- Rank: General
- Known for: Military governorship of Smolensk.
- Conflicts: Treelist: Seven Years' War; Battle of Gross-Jägersdorf; Battle of Paltzig (WIA); Russo-Turkish War (1768–74); Orlov Revolt; Siege of Modon (Note: The unsuccessful 1770 siege of an Ottoman castle (Methoni's) by Russo-Greek landing troops of Major Prince Pyotr Petrovich Dolgorukov and by Russian naval detachment of Captain Samuil Karlovich Greig, which lasted from April 20 to May 4.); Battle of Chesma; War of the Bar Confederation; War of the Second Coalition; Suvorov's Italian campaign; Battle of the Adda River; Combat of Lecco; Combat of Verderio; Battle of Bassignana; Battle of Trebbia; Combat of Gavi; Suvorov's Swiss campaign; Battle of Gotthard Pass; Battle of Oberalpsee; Battle of Muottental
- Awards: Order of Saint John of Jerusalem (Russia) (Note: For the battle of the Trebbia.); Order of Saint Andrew

Diederich Arend von (Note: In German personal names, von is a preposition which approximately means 'of' or 'from' and usually denotes some sort of nobility. While von (always lower case) is part of the family name or territorial designation, not a first or middle name, if the noble is referred to by their last name, use Schiller, Clausewitz or Goethe, not von Schiller, etc.) Rosenberg or Andrei Grigoryevich Rosenberg (Russian: Андре́й Григо́рьевич Ро́зенберг, romanized: Andréy Grigór'yevič Rózenberg; 1739 – 7 September 1813 (Note: Old Style 25 Aug. 1813)) was an Imperial Russian general who led troops against Ottoman Turkey, the Polish–Lithuanian Commonwealth and Republican France. During the War of the Second Coalition he capably led an army corps under the famous Alexander Suvorov at Cassano, Bassignana and the Trebbia. In addition, his advance guard fought at Gavi when pursuing retreating French troops after the Battle of Novi. During Suvorov's Swiss campaign, Rosenberg's column took the Oberalp Pass around Lake Oberalpsee; while in independent tactical command, he and his rearguard badly defeated a French force under André Masséna in the Battle of the Muotatal (Muottental/Muttental) on 30 September – 1 October 1799.

== Biography ==
=== Early service ===
In 1739, Rosenberg was born into a family belonging to the Baltic nobility. He joined the Imperial Russian army and fought against the Kingdom of Prussia in the Seven Years' War and Ottoman Turkey in the Russo-Turkish War of 1768–74, including participation in the naval battle of Chesma, the ravaging of that city, and the capture of its artillery batteries. He also led troops against the Poles during the War of the Bar Confederation in 1778–9.

=== Italy and Switzerland ===
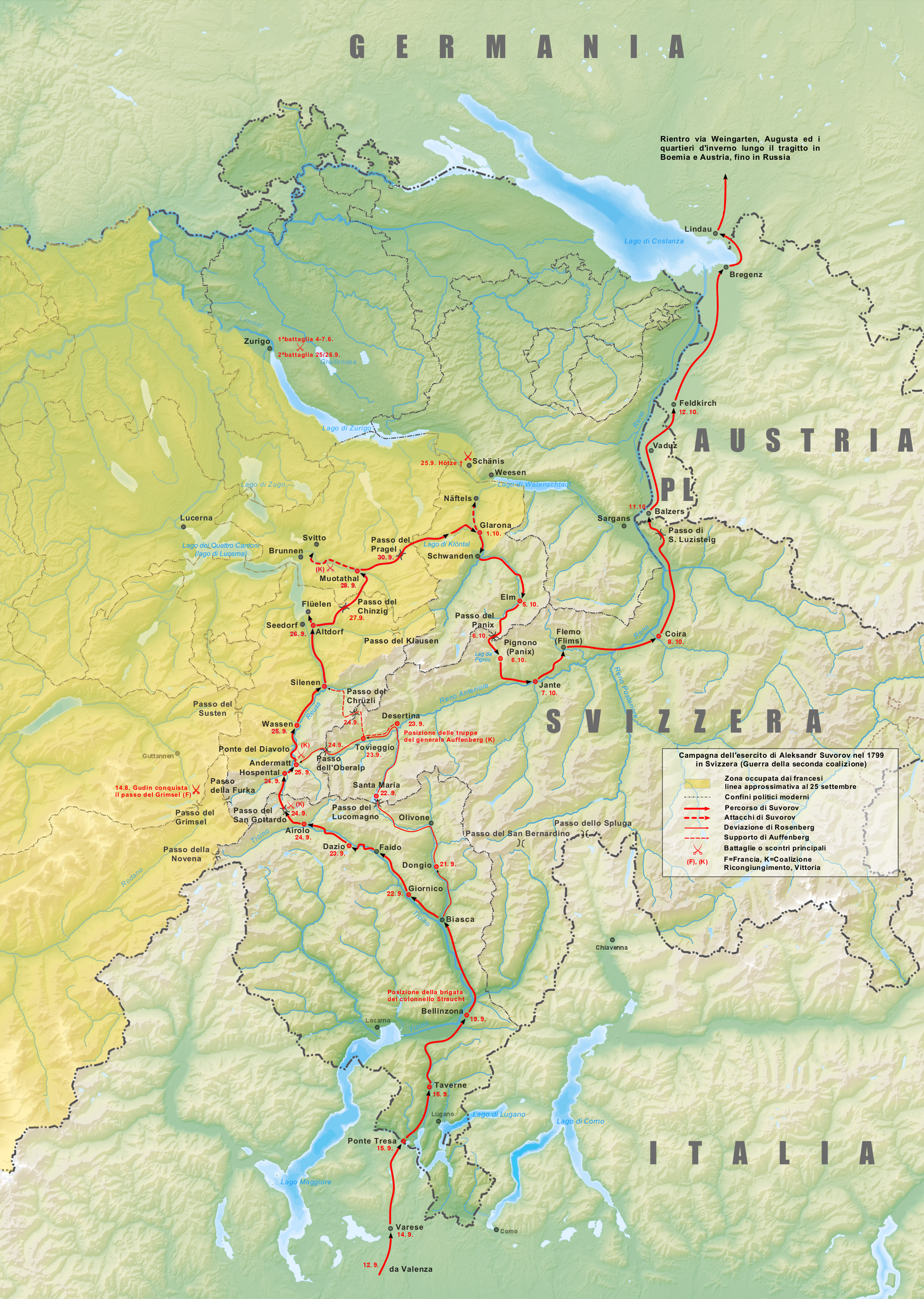
Suvorov's Swiss campaign; Rosenberg's column is a solid thin line

In 1798 Rosenberg was assigned to lead the first echelon of the Russian army sent to assist Habsburg Austria in Italy during the War of the Second Coalition. During his corps' passage across Habsburg territory, Rosenberg kept strict discipline among his soldiers while ensuring that his hosts kept up their end of the bargain with regard to providing his men with food and living quarters. Rosenberg was remembered as being highly professional and concerned with the welfare of his men, but aloof in his dealings with the rank and file. In his first meeting with the new army commander he did not make a good impression on Alexander Suvorov. Nevertheless, he was reassigned to lead the second echelon when Wilhelm Derfelden assumed command of Rosenberg's original corps.

Suvorov learnt that the Archduke Charles, who was with Rimsky-Korsakov in Switzerland, came out of Switzerland, leaving Korsakov alone against Masséna's French army. This news is very concerned Suvorov for the fate of Rimsky-Korsakov's detachment and forced to hurry toward Switzerland, to the upper Reuss, he intended to go to the rear of Masséna's army, about which he notified Rimsky-Korsakov. Rosenberg's troops marched in an advanced column, opening the way for the rest of the troops. Steep ascents and descents slowed down the movement; and, it was pouring rain. The troops made their first overnight stay, from 22 to 23 September, on a snowy ridge, in a cold stormy night, at an altitude of 8,000 feet, without kindling to build bivouac fires; the packs all fell behind. At dawn on the 23rd Rosenberg first climbed the steep ascent to the snowy ridge, then descended into the gorge of the Reuss, and along it reached Disentis, where he saw a spacious valley; the troops, continuing on their way, arrived at the lodging by midnight, having travelled in three days about 80 km; there were almost no stragglers: those who were exhausted were supported by their comrades. On the 24th of September Rosenberg had to go to the Urseren or Andermatt and on the way to attack the French, who stood in the Urner Loch position under the command of Gudin. The position from Italy's side was unavailable: there was a narrow path leading to it, barely suitable for packs, on a steep, winding slope, crossed more than once by mountain streams. Having taken a detour, Rosenberg began to appear in the French rear and thereby induced them to leave the position occupied by him, on which Suvorov also led the attack. Fog and night darkness favoured the French retreat. Rosenberg, not knowing the terrain, stopped in the Urseren, where he arrived at 7 o'clock in the evening. At dawn on 25 September went on to the Devil's Bridge, also occupied by the French. It was necessary to descend into the Reuss River's gorge, to cross the turbulent stream, waist-deep in water, then to climb up to the left bank's mountain heights and to appear in the French rear. After a long battle the troops reached Altdorf, where Lecourbe held a position. Rosenberg's troops lined up in battle order, soon knocked out the French and occupied Altdorf on the 26th of September, where they found a lot of supplies of all kinds, which were very useful for them.

=== Later years ===
When Suvorov's Swiss campaign was over, Rosenberg was awarded the Order of St. Andrew the First-Called on 9 November 1799. Soon there was a spat between Emperor Paul I with his ally,—and he ordered Suvorov to return with his army to the fatherland. The army went on a return march, in Kraków; in March 1800, Field Marshal Suvorov said goodbye to it and handed over command of it to the senior man after him — Rosenberg, who brought the army to its homeland. Emperor Paul appointed Rosenberg (20 June 1800) military governor of Kamenets-Podolsky, troop inspector of the Dnieper Inspection and chief of the Vladimir Musketeer Regiment. In 1803, on 23 October, Alexander I entrusted him with the Kherson Governorate management, appointing him military governor of Kherson and inspector of the Crimean Infantry, — but not for long: in 1805, Rosenberg asked for dismissal from service due to ill health and on 25 March was dismissed with retention of all the salaries he was receiving. He died on 7 September 1813 in the old town of Chyornoye, 32 km from Kamenets-Podolsky, granted to him by the Emperor Paul for 50 years. Rosenberg was not married.

== Sources ==
- Duffy, Christopher (1999). Eagles Over the Alps: Suvarov in Italy and Switzerland, 1799. Chicago, Ill.: The Emperor's Press. ISBN 1-883476-18-6.
- Smith, Digby (1998). The Napoleonic Wars Data Book. London: Greenhill. ISBN 1-85367-276-9.
- Polovtsov, Alexander (1913). Russian Biographical Dictionary (in Russian). Vol. 16: Рейтерн—Рольцберг. Saint Petersburg: Типография Императорской Академии Наук. pp. 354–359.
- Bodart, Gaston (1908). Militär-historisches Kriegs-Lexikon (1618-1905) (in German). Vienna & Leipzig: C. W. Stern.
