= Suvorov crossing the Alps =

1899 painting by Russian artist Vasily Surikov

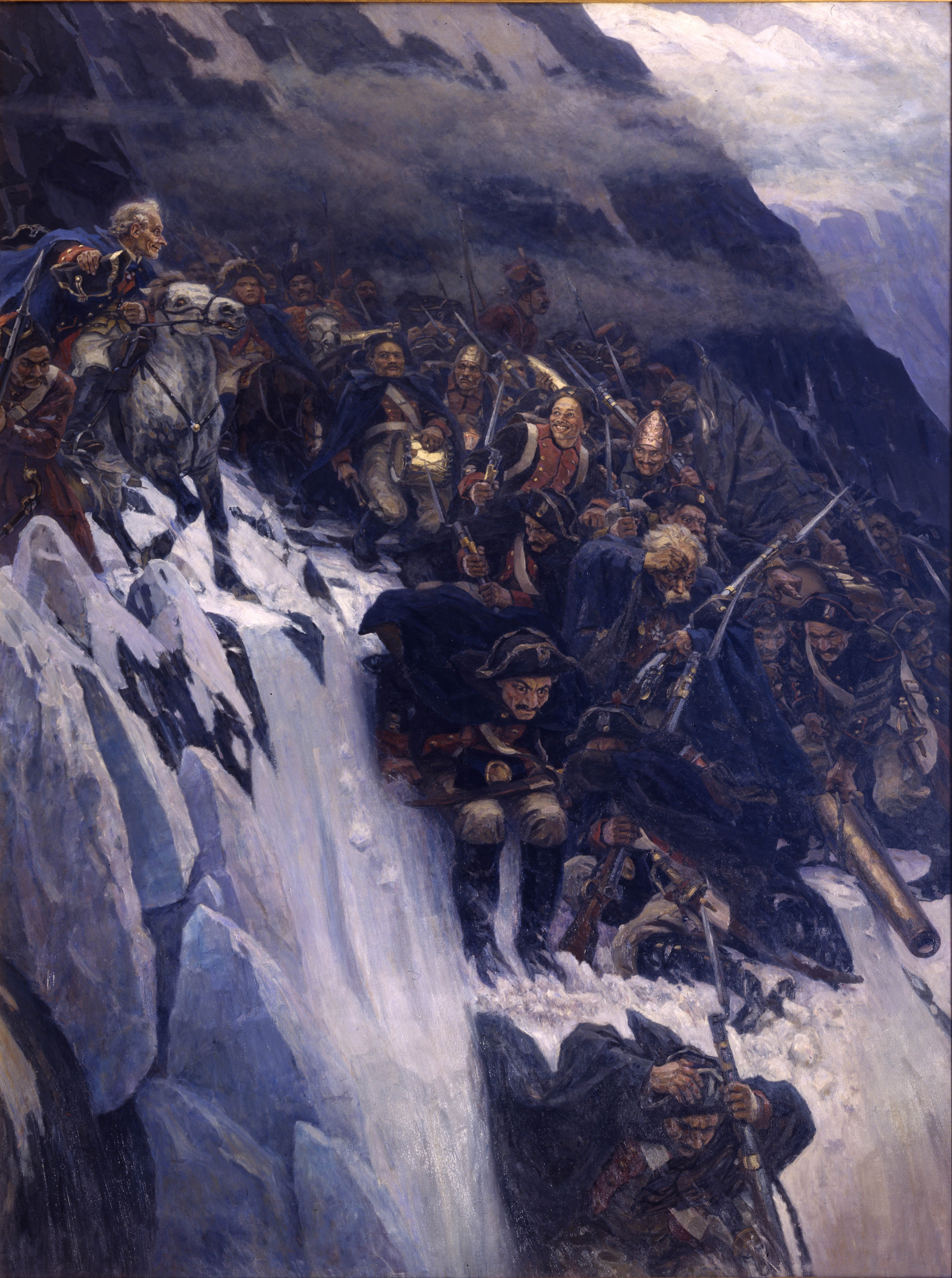
- Artist: Vasily Surikov
- Year: 1899
- Medium: Oil on canvas
- Dimensions: 495 cm × 373 cm (195 in × 147 in)
- Location: Russian Museum, Saint-Petersburg

Suvorov crossing the Alps (Russian: Переход Суворова через Альпы) is an 1899 painting by Vasily Surikov, painted to commemorate the centenary of General Alexander Suvorov's Swiss campaign.

== Composition ==
The painting depicts the final stages of Suvorov's Swiss campaign, when his army was withdrawing to Germany. The painting shows soldiers making a difficult and potentially life-threatening leap while calm and smiling because they believe in their commander.

== History ==
Surikov conceived of the painting in 1895. In order to depict it in more detail, he went to Switzerland. The painting is in a vertical format, unusual for Surikov. It was completed in 1899, in time for the centennial of the campaign. The painting was bought by Nicholas II for 25,000 rubles.
