= Suvorov's Swiss campaign =

Alexander Suvorov's 1799 campaign in Switzerland

- Part of the Italian and Swiss expedition (War of the Second Coalition)
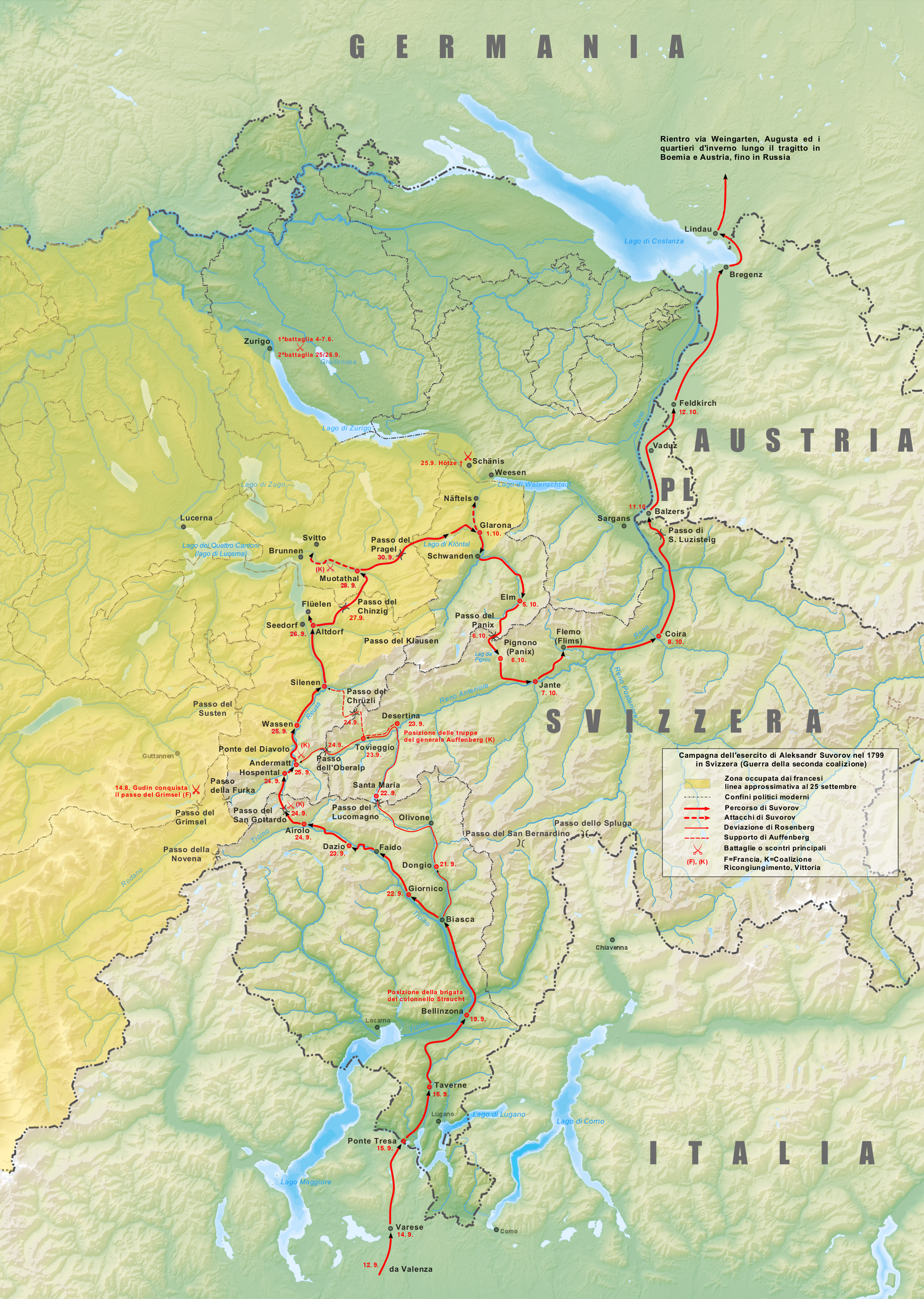
- The Swiss campaign route of Alexander Suvorov, 1799
Date	September 11 – October 7, 1799
Location	Helvetic Republic (modern Switzerland)
Result	Victory of the French First Republic; Suvorov escaped the encirclement; Russia pulls out of the Second Coalition

Belligerents
Russia; Holy Roman Empire (Habsburg monarchy)	France; Helvetic Republic

Commanders and leaders
(Russian Empire) Alexander Suvorov (main commander) Pyotr Bagration; Andrei Rosenberg; Franz von Auffenberg	(French First Republic) André Masséna (main commander) Claude Lecourbe; Gabriel Molitor; Jean-de-Dieu Soult

Strength
27,000	77,000

Casualties and losses
1,600 killed 3,500 wounded	Unknown

Suvorov's Swiss campaign took place on Swiss territory between September and October 1799 during the War of the Second Coalition. Russo-Austrian troops, who had already repeatedly defeated the French in Italy between April and August, crossed St. Gotthard under the command of Field Marshal Alexander Vasilyevich Suvorov-Rymniksky, with orders to march against General André Masséna to drive him out of the Helvetic Republic. The campaign was an instance of mountain warfare.

After the important victories of the previous months during the campaign in Italy, Suvorov had remained in control of the situation in the northern part of the Peninsula and a final defeat of the French seemed imminent with the Russian general determined to march even to France, but the divisions and rivalries of the coalesced powers would soon favor the resurgence of the revolutionary armies: fearing that Russia's influence would become too great, the Allies, also leveraging Tsar Paul I's ambitions to present himself as the liberator of Switzerland, succeeded in getting Russian troops to halt their operations in Italy and be redeployed to the Confederation, leaving the initiative in the Peninsula to the Austrians. Suvorov was then ordered to head north with his army and march across St. Gotthard to join the Russian troops that had just been led across the Limmat by General Alexander Mikhailovich Rimsky-Korsakov.

Marshal Suvorov took St. Gotthard after fierce battles and then marched laboriously along the Reuss River valley, constantly opposed by General Claude Lecourbe. When he reached Altdorf he was forced to detour northeast through the mountains, as the French firmly controlled Lake Lucerne and the passes to the west. General Masséna then sent the divisions of Generals Honoré Gazan and Édouard Mortier, coordinated by General Jean-de-Dieu Soult, to block the Russian advance between Schwyz and Glarus; Suvorov then headed for the Linth, having achieved some success (Note: See also: Battle of Klöntal, Battle of Muottental) and captured Glarus, one of the main goals; although his soldiers under Bagration's tactical control came to a stalemate at Näfels against General Gabriel Molitor's soldiers. The village of Näfels changed hands up to six times.

Marshal Suvorov's situation, isolated in the mountains, with scarce supplies and opposed on all fronts by French troops, became increasingly difficult; after learning of the defeat of Generals Korsakov and Hotze in the Second Battle of Zurich and the Battle of Linth River, he had no choice but to attempt to retreat eastward for the purpose of rescuing the remnants of his now heavily strained army. The retreat of the Russians was very difficult and cost new heavy losses, while all artillery was lost; finally, via the Panix Pass, the Russians reached the Rhine at Glion (or Ilanz) on October 7 and then continued on to Vorarlberg, where they joined General Korsakov's survivors. Suvorov was recalled to St. Petersburg, where he again fell out of favor with the tsarist court: Paul I refused to receive him in audience and, injured and ill, the elderly general died after a few weeks in the capital on May 18, 1800. Masséna would later confess that he would exchange all his victories for Suvorov's passage of the Alps.

== Political and military background ==
Between the end of April and mid-August 1799, Field Marshal Aleksandr Vasilyevich Suvorov had routed French revolutionary troops in northern Italy, caused the collapse of the sister republics in the Peninsula, and taken de facto control of Lombardy and Piedmont. Thanks to his brilliant victories, he had received from the tsar the title of "Prince of Italy" (Knjaz Italijski - Russian: Князь Италийский, hence the nickname Italiskij, "the Italic") and was now close to finally crushing the last French resistance in Piedmont and then invading the Ligurian Riviera; Suvorov had also declared himself ready to even march to Paris as he had promised General Jean Mathieu Philibert Sérurier before releasing him (Note: Suvorov had defeated Sérurier's troops in April 1799 during the previous campaign in Italy, taking him prisoner along with his entire division. Sérurier was freed after he promised not to fight the Russians again during that campaign, and in taking leave of him, Suvorov reportedly told him, "See you in Paris!".).

The divisions and rivalries among the coalesced powers, Kingdom of Great Britain, Holy Roman Empire, and Russian Empire, however, did not allow them to take advantage of the victories in Italy, favoring instead soon the recovery of the forces of the First French Republic: the British were afraid that Russian influence in Italy would become too great and that Tsarist power would overlook the Mediterranean ports dangerously (Note: Paul I aspired to secure a military presence in the Kingdom of Naples to guard Malta, have an alternative base to those on the Black Sea for a future expedition against Constantinople and support and arm against Selim III and the Greeks, who were claiming freedom and autonomy from the Ottoman Empire.); the Austrians saw the Russian successes and the Tsar's meddling as a real threat to their supremacy in northern Italy, to the extent that they preferred to lose Russian military support in Piedmont rather than the political advantage that would come to them at the peace table, when they would present themselves as the sole occupants of the Savoy state from which, moreover, they could easily enter France alone with their own army. The British government, worried that Republican France might use the powerful Dutch fleet to threaten the British Isles directly, had then prepared new war plans that included redeploying the Russian army to Switzerland to facilitate the landing of an Anglo-Russian coalition in the Batavian Republic.

Although in theory Suvorov answered directly to the tsar, the Austrian court council and Chancellor Thugut ordered him to abandon Italy and move toward Switzerland, where his army was to join a second Russian contingent under the command of General Aleksandr Mikhailovich Rimsky-Korsakov, arriving with 30,000 men from Galicia. General Michael von Melas's Austrian army was to garrison Piedmont and seize Cuneo; at the same time Archduke Charles was to move from Switzerland to Germany along the Rhine so that Austria would also have a chance to oust the Elector of Bavaria Maximilian I.

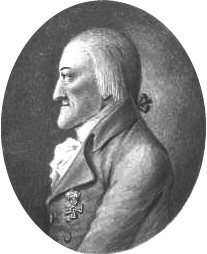
J. A. F. de Paula, baron of Thugut

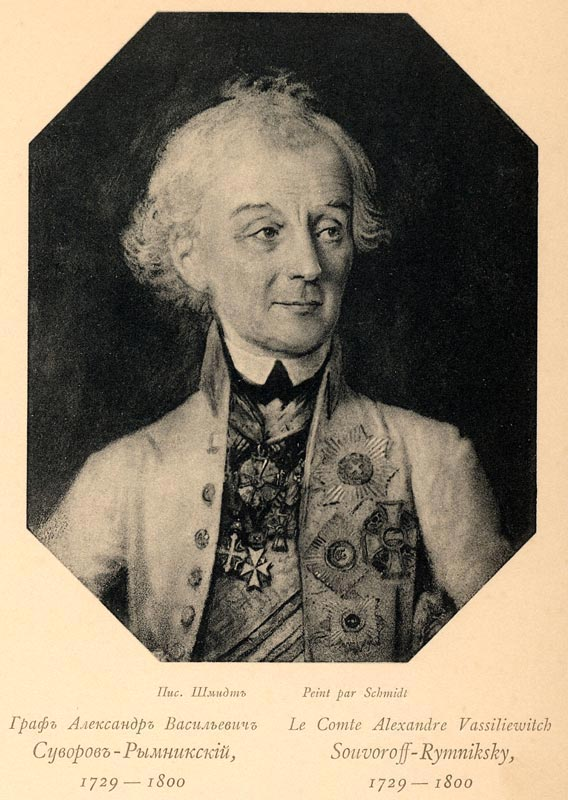
Portrait of Suvorov, 1799

Suvorov would have liked Archduke Charles to await his arrival before moving, so as to give Korsakov ease in organizing himself and resisting the overwhelming French forces, but the archduke was an all too faithful executor of the orders of the courtly council and immediately left the strong position in Zurich: the French quickly occupied it and Korsakov was doomed to certain defeat. Suvorov's remonstrances were futile:

The position in Zurich, which was to be defended by 60000 Austrians, had been abandoned to 20000 Russians (...)

— Letter to Archduke Charles - from the Summary of Suvorov's Campaign in Switzerland by Count Vénanson

Suvorov's last holdouts, who had called Chancellor Thugut "out of his mind" for the strategy imposed, were swept away on August 25 by a letter from the Austrian emperor, peremptorily ordering him to abandon plans to attack the French in Genoa and immediately cross the Alps to launch an offensive against France from Switzerland. Beyond the decisions of what Carl von Clausewitz later termed a "narrow-minded policy" on the part of the British and Austrians, aimed simply at avoiding an inconvenient Russian presence in Italy and the Mediterranean and meeting special needs, modern historiography has seen clear military advantages in these plans.

After the Austrian cession of Belgium to France by the Treaty of Campo Formio in 1797, and the vast German territory separating them, the two ancient rival powers had but the Italian battlefields to come into direct contact and confront each other militarily; to secure strategic control of them it was necessary to secure dominance of the Alpine ranges: Austria possessed a large part of the Alpine chain, and from Tyrol could bring down numerous battalions unhindered into the extensive plains washed by the Po; in contrast, France did not initially have this obvious and coveted advantage. The major obstacle was Switzerland, which stretched from the Tyrolean Alps to the borders of France, and prevented access from the Alps for much of the range: it was therefore of paramount interest to the French Republic, if it wished to continue the war with Austria, to retain possession of the Swiss Plateau obtained in February 1798 with the invasion led by General Guillaume Marie-Anne Brune.

This provided the revolutionaries with two strategic outlets: one allowed them to bypass the Black Forest and easily sweep into the upper Danube, and the other to descend through the Alpine passes of Valais and reach northern Italy directly; once war broke out again, it therefore became of enormous tactical and strategic importance for the Austrians to drive the French out of Switzerland. For their part, the British considered Switzerland to be the ideal territory from which to launch an invasion of France, and finally, the Austrians were in any case more concerned about the French troops concentrated along the Rhine than about the surviving troops in Italy: by switching to a more prudent defensive tactic in the north of the Peninsula, the Austrians still secured its dominance and could free up forces to deploy in Germany.

== The Russian army in the Alps ==
=== The march to Switzerland ===
Suvorov on the march to the Gotthard Pass

On September 4, Suvorov informed the tsar that he was about to move to Switzerland, not failing to lament how from the beginning of the campaign the Austrians had been consistently reluctant to support him, slow to respond to his orders and utterly inefficient in meeting his demands for supplies and ammunition. He did not fail to emphasize how the Allies purposely delayed supplies with the intent of forcing him to leave Italy. He wrote among other things:

(...) in spite of our great victories and achievements, they have always limited themselves to writing me only letters of disappointment and full of blame or requests to give advance notice of all military actions. (...) [Nevertheless I am] about to embark on this laborious march to Switzerland.

— Suvorov to Tsar Paul - Documents of Suvorov, September 4, 1799, IV pp. 299-300

Suvorov marched on September 11, immediately after the capture of Tortona, sending baggage, equipment and heavy artillery via Como and Verona to arrive in Switzerland near Chur in the Grisons, and from the Tyrol to Feldkirch, while he with about 27,000 men, including nearly 16,000 infantrymen and more than 3,500 Cossacks, took the Varese route to move toward Bellinzona. On September 15, the Russian vanguard under the command of Pyotr Ivanovich Bagration entered Swiss territory near Ponte Tresa, and after a few days the main army assembled at Taverne in Ticino; Suvorov, who had expected to find supplies there for the following week's march via a caravan of 1,500 mules previously requested from the Austrians, found that the Austrians had sent nothing.

The initial astonishment was succeeded by outrage and then anger: before a contrite General Weyrother, an Austrian liaison officer, he explicitly accused Melas and the Viennese court of having hatched a treason "which the tsar will know how to punish." The senior general wrote an angry letter to Emperor Francis II expressing outrage and lamenting how Austrian inefficiency had nullified the tactical advantage of his rapid march to Switzerland. By this time, however, the damage was done: only six hundred and fifty mules arrived, which was absolutely insufficient, and Suvorov, at Prince Konstantin's suggestion, decided to use the horses of the Cossacks to transport sufficient provisions and ammunition for the next eight days (Note: Other sources report that the idea actually came from Colonel Strauch, who had noted in reports how of the three thousand horses available to the Cossacks no more than five hundred could be used on the passes, leaving the others available for pack; Weyrother attributes it to Suvorov, praising his steadfastness in resisting the grievances of the men deprived of their horses; the Russian general in his letters to the tsar, however, gave credit to the prince, perhaps to curry favor with him.). The Ticinese relate that officers who had horses and carriages available for their personal use had to, according to the Russian commander's orders, surrender the former as beasts of burden and abandon the carriages. The greatest examples were set by Prince Constantine, who sent his three carriages back to Como, and Suvorov himself, who, although in his sixties, abandoned his litter and decided to march on foot as well. In the four days of waiting before they could finally move, the Russian troops were summarily instructed in mountain warfare tactics, with which they were totally unfamiliar.

=== The assault on the Gotthard Pass and the arrival at Lake Lucerne ===
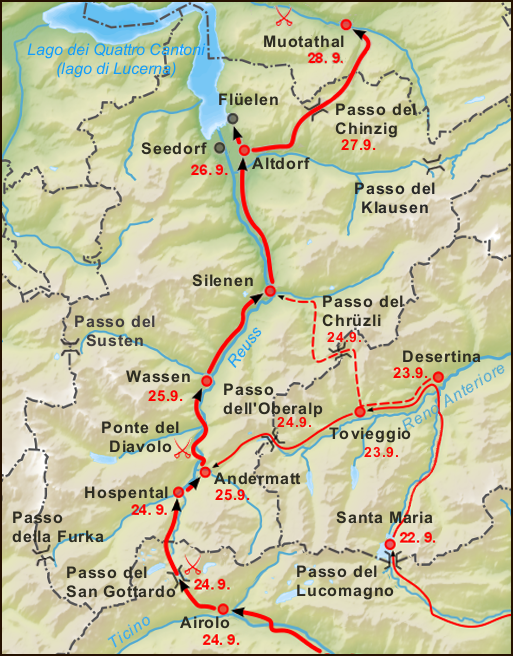
Suvorov's route from Airolo to Muotathal

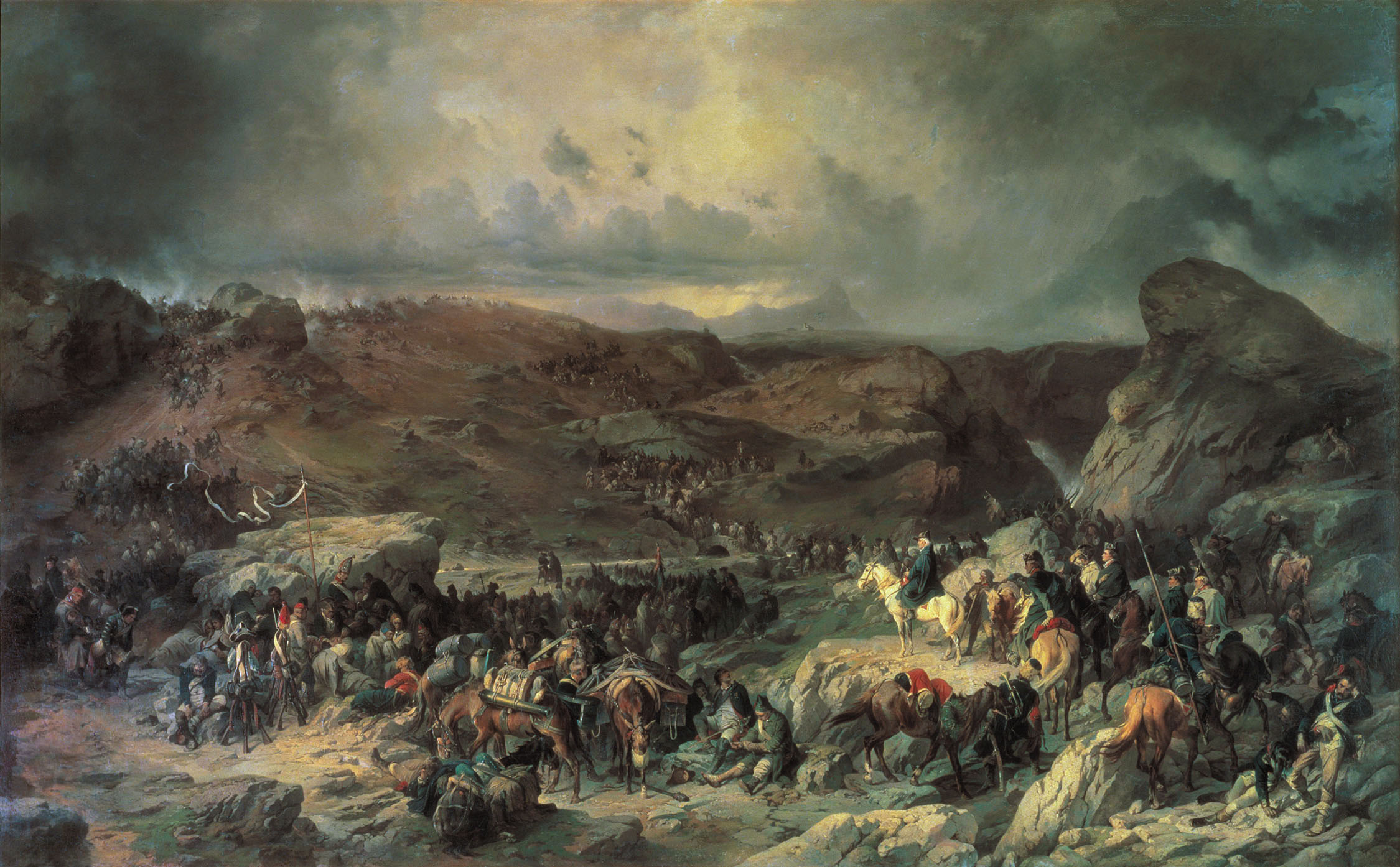
Suvorov crossing the Gotthard Pass, painting by Alexander Kotzebue

On September 21, Suvorov ordered the advance. The march proceeded slowly, slowed by heavy rains, fog, and mountainous terrain. Nevertheless, that evening the entire army was already encamped between Sant'Antonino and Bellinzona, in another day's march passed through Biasca, and on the evening of the 22nd reached Giornico, where the Allied General Staff spent the night. The weather continued to be harsh and, on the night of September 23, a blizzard of rain and snow plagued the army, which was reinforced at Faido by an Austrian regiment under the command of Colonel Gottfried Strauch.

Suvorov then set out to cross the Gotthard by the 25th with the intention of reuniting with Korsakov at Lucerne on Sept. 27; but on the 24th, at Airolo, a French battalion belonging to General Claude Lecourbe's division and commanded by Brigadier General Charles-Étienne Gudin de La Sablonnière halted the march of the Russians, who left six hundred dead on the ground before they were able to penetrate late in the evening into the Val Tremola, with Suvorov remaining in the front line all along.

On the morning of the 25th, the general resumed his march toward Andermatt, while the French had retreated behind the "Buca d'Uri" (a tunnel in the Schöllenen Gorge, on the north side of the Gotthard Pass in the Urseren valley) partially demolishing the Devil's Bridge (a stone crossing in Uri near Andermatt). Here another Lecourbe contingent, under the orders this time of Louis Henri Loison, laid an ambush that cost the lives of more than nine hundred Russians before they managed to repair the bridge by makeshift means and cross to the other side, under constant enemy artillery and musket fire, finally forcing the French to retreat.

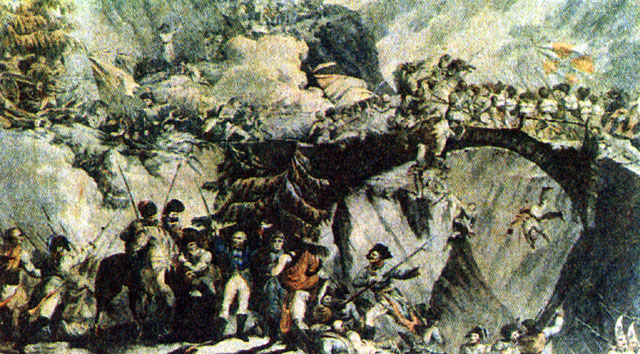
Suvorov crossing the Devil's Bridge

In contrast to the Russians, Lecourbe's troops were highly specialized in mountain warfare to the extent that they "marched even where chamois hunters would give up," "used to sleeping in the snow and under the stars, bitten by the wind, on the rags they used as uniforms," and venturing "without [alpine] guides on paths over sheer chasms." They would be a constant thorn in the side of the Allied troops.

Continuing to move to the right along the Reuss valley, Suvorov nonetheless seized the Gotthard Pass by repelling General Lecourbe, and on the evening of September 26 his troops reached Altdorf near the southern end of Lake Lucerne. For the Russian general, the bulk of the effort was accomplished; cheerful and optimistic, he wrote in his own hand, on a dispatch addressed to Austrian General Friedrich von Hotze, a rhyming note in German that has remained famous:

So we have with sabers and bayonets
– Saved Switzerland from their ruin.

— Suvorov to Hotze

The general was unaware, however, that in those same hours General Masséna, who had concentrated as many as 77,000 men under his orders, was routing Korsakov's forces in the Second Battle of Zurich, inflicting heavy losses on him and forcing him to beat a retreat to Winterthur and beyond to Schaffhausen, while on the Linth the troops of General Jean-de-Dieu Soult defeated the Austrian troops of General von Hotze, who was killed early in the clash.

=== The crossing of Chinzig ===
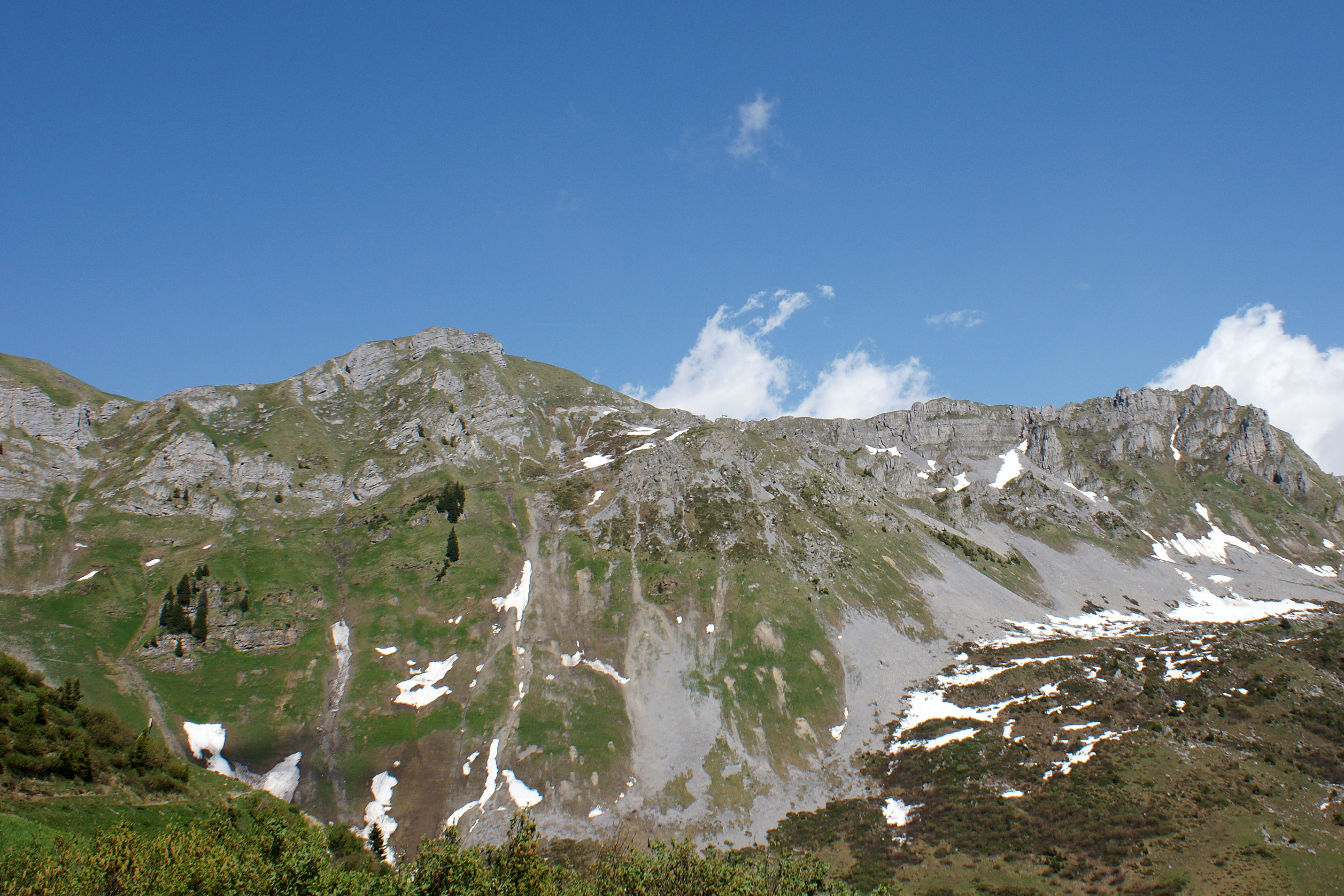
The Kinzig Pass

On Lake Lucerne, the French stood firmly on the left bank of the Reuss near Seedorf, closing off the Russians from reaching the eponymous town via the Surenen Pass, while the lake itself, patrolled by a small flotilla, appeared to be under full French control, making a crossing by the Russians impossible.

Suvorov's troops were at their wits' end: marching over rocks had worn out the soldiers' inadequate footwear, of which many were now even deprived, uniforms were often in tatters, rifles and bayonets were rusting from the constant dampness, and the men were starving for lack of adequate supplies. Suvorov was still unaware of Korsakov's defeat, but in the absence of news he preferred not to stop at Altdorf to let his exhausted army rest, which he directed instead, as early as the early hours of September 27, toward the Chinzig Pass, counting on bypassing the French by reaching Schwyz from the village of Muotathal. The plan was to climb, starting from an altitude of about 500 m, up to 2,070 m along a precipitous path carved into the rock and almost invisible under the first snowfall.

Lecourbe immediately informed General Masséna of the Russians' detour, and the latter, who had previously planned to attack Suvorov in the Reuss valley, was forced to change strategy: he therefore sent General Mortier to occupy Muotathal with 9,000 men and General Gazan to march with about 10,000 men on Weesen and Schänis, to close off the Linth valley from the north, while he himself concentrated the bulk of his troops at Schwyz.

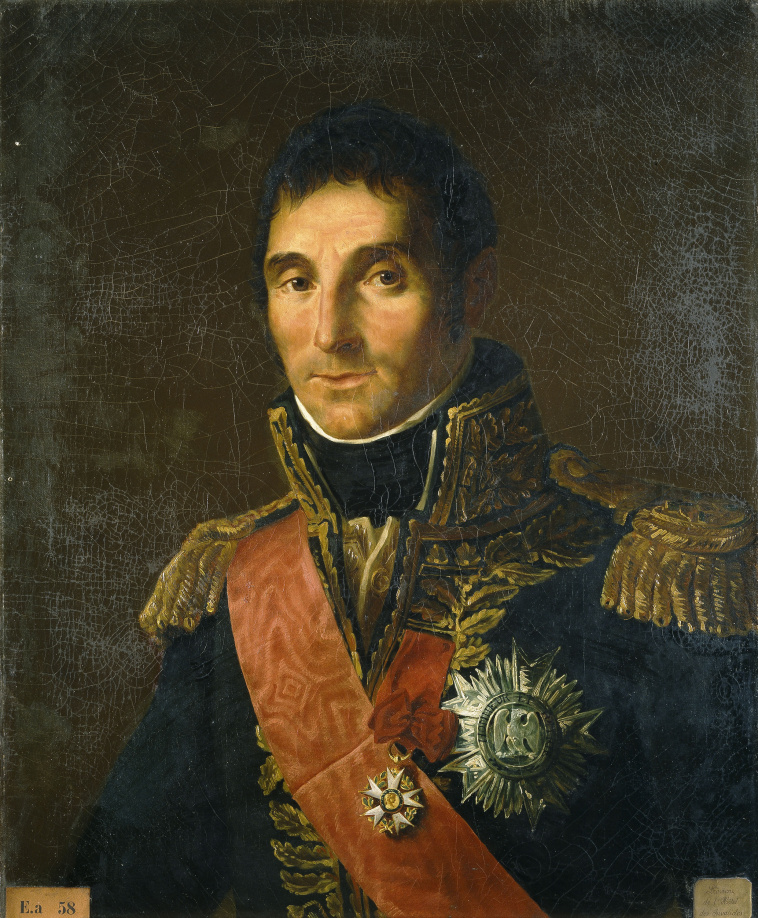
General André Masséna, commander of the French army in Switzerland

As soon as they reached Muotathal, Suvorov's 18,000 exhausted men, without supplies and ammunition and surrounded by impassable mountains in freezing cold, faced a French army far superior in numbers and equipment. On September 29, still uncertain about the fate of Korsakov and Hotze (Note: In fact, the news had already leaked out through the interrogation of some French prisoners, but they were not believed.), Suvorov called a council of war with his general staff to decide what to do. During the council the Russian commander showed himself extremely resolute not to surrender, blamed the Austrian allies for all the hardships they were forced to suffer, and proposed what appeared to him to be the only possible solution:

To go back is dishonorable. I have never retreated. Advancing to Schwyz is impossible: Massena commands more than 60,000 men and our troops do not reach 20,000. We are short of supplies, ammunition and artillery.... We cannot expect help from anyone. We are on the edge of the precipice! All we have left is to rely on Almighty God and the courage and spirit of sacrifice of my troops! We are Russians! God is with us!

— Suvorov to his general staff, September 29, 1799

After Suvorov's impassioned speeches to raise the morale of his subordinates, the war council decided to abandon the plan to head for Schwyz and instead to move eastward again, over the Muotathal Pass to the Pragel Pass and then through the Klöntal Pass, to rejoin General Linken at Glarus and, if possible, to aim then for Sargans by skirting the Walensee to the south. Bagration and Franz Xaver von Auffenberg were positioned in the vanguard; Andrey Rosenberg's troops, placed in the rear, were ordered to protect the army from attacks that might come from the west, from Schwyz across the Muotathal, while the main force marched east through the Pragel Pass.

From original Russian records later found by the French in Muotathal, the precise numerical strength of the Russian army on September 30, 1799, is known: 66 staff officers, 493 troop officers, 1,172 non-commissioned officers, 403 musicians, and 16,584 troopers were counted; of the latter, 410 were reported sick, 216 were limping and 21 under arrest, only 85 men had deserted; in ten days the Russian army had lost about 3,000 soldiers and now had food rations for only five days, but these already meager supplies would have to be rationed to last at least ten.

=== The march to Glarus ===
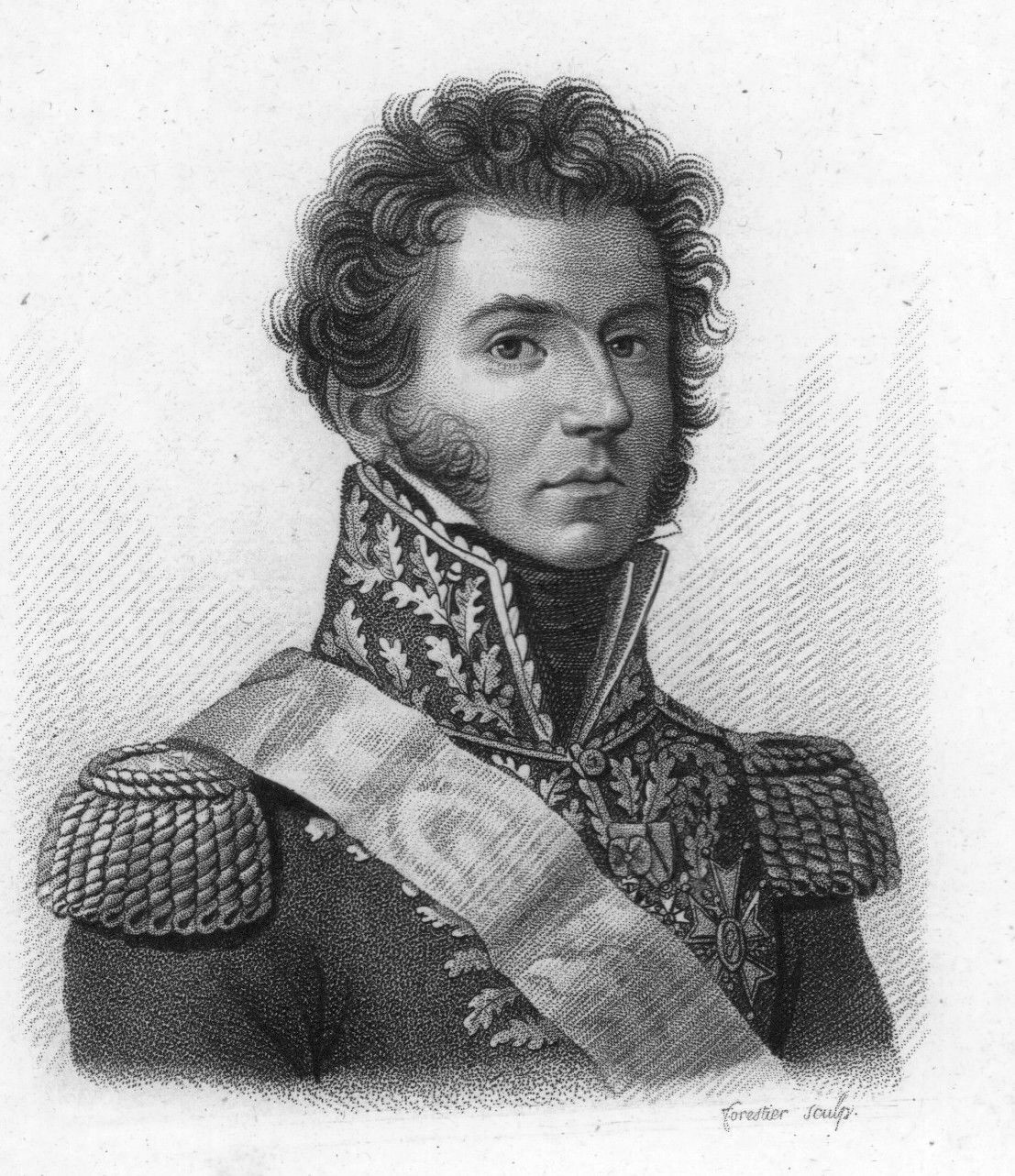
General Gabriel Jean Molitor

Despite the strenuous marches and the sustained fights, the army moved immediately. Auffenberg's troops advanced first, followed by Bagration's troops. As soon as they reached the Pragel Pass, there was a clash between the former and Molitor's French who prevented them from passing. Arriving in the afternoon, Bagration, who was "outraged to see the Austrians retreat before a handful of men," turned the tide of the battle by driving the French back and offering them a chance to surrender. He was unaware that Auffenberg had already sent a similar ultimatum to Molitor and that the latter had refused by responding disdainfully:

Tell your commander that his proposal is reckless. Is he thus unaware that his rendezvous with Korsakov and Hotze is cancelled? I have defeated myself Jelačić and Lincken who are now pinned down in Glarus. Marshal Suvorov is surrounded on all sides. He will be the one forced to surrender!

— Molitor to Auffenberg and Bagration

Suvorov did not have time to realize the seriousness of the news when Bagration's troops resumed the assault against the French, who, after dark, were forced to retreat to Klöntalersee, where many in the flight drowned but where the French general also had a chance to reorganize and better arrange his troops to face his opponents.

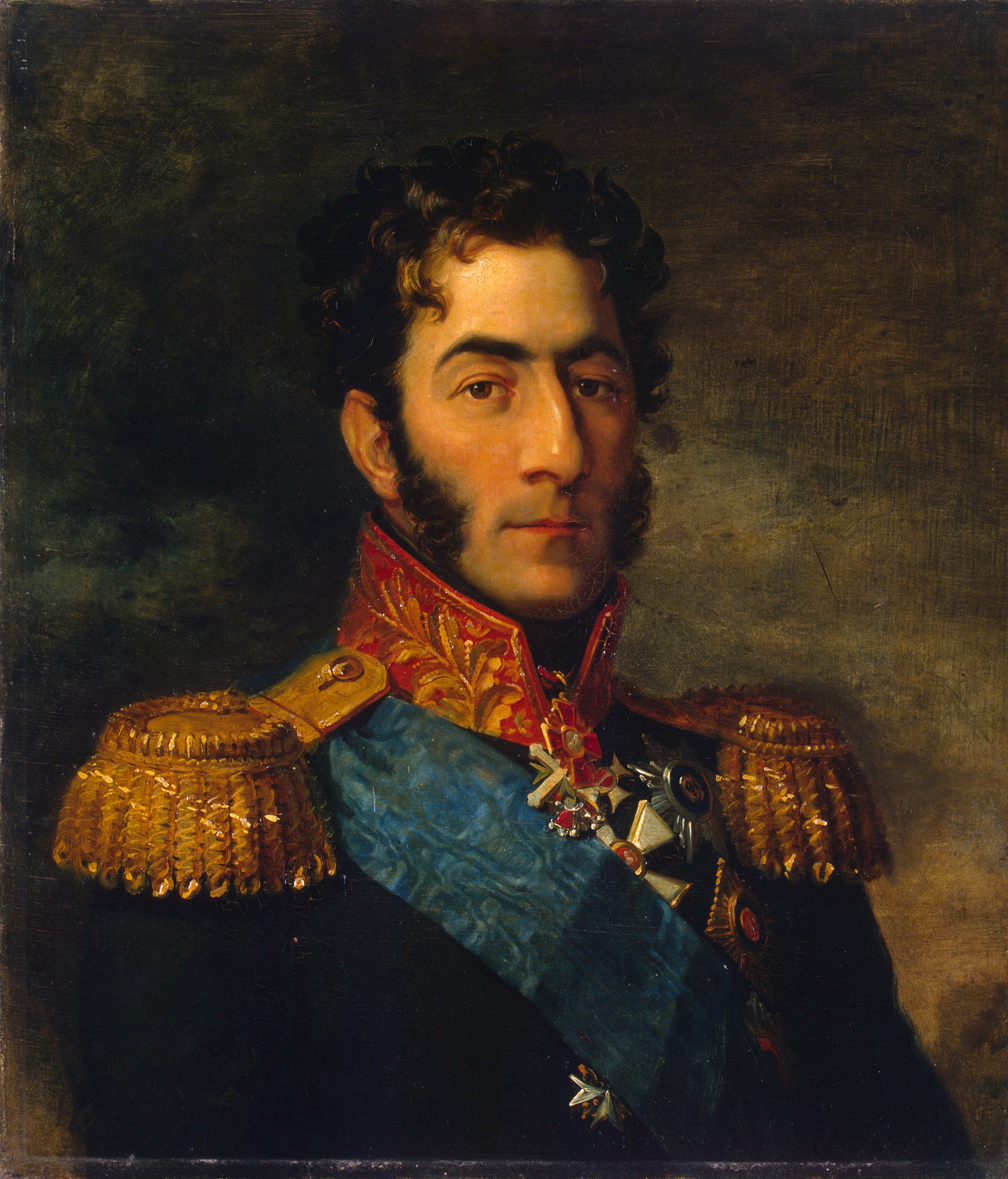
Portrait of General Pyotr Ivanovich Bagration

Bagration led his battalions in four desperate assaults against the French artillery, which was well placed on the road and on the rocks overlooking it, and suffered very heavy losses; meanwhile the weather worsened, sleet began to fall, and the Russians retreated for the night, which they spent freezing as they were forbidden to light fires, and once again suffered from starvation. Bagration, though suffering from a thigh wound, reorganized his troops under the cover of darkness and continued to encourage them:

We must wait and the Lord will come to our rescue; we will spend the night in Glarus. As soon as I order it, you must attack immediately!

— Bagration to his troops

The clash resumed on the morning of October 1 with Bagration's charge, which launched an attack, led by Lieutenant Colonel Giorgio Giovanni Zuccato, using two battalions, four Austrian companies and about 200 dismounted Cossacks in order to occupy some cliffs overlooking, almost precipitously, the enemy's right flank. From there the Russian troops, discovered by some French patrols, exposed to enemy fire, went on the attack by assaulting the French troops with bayonets, while further down Derfelden's troops attacked the enemy in front forcing him to retreat further. Molitor, after a fierce but brief resistance, preferred to withdraw his troops to the nearby hills to reorganize along the course of the Linth, setting up a series of defense lines between Netstal, Näfels and Mollis in the northern part of the canton of Glarus, destroying the bridge at Netstal and retaining control of the remaining communication routes between Näfels and Mollis. This allowed them to effectively control both sides of the river.

In the early afternoon of the same day Bagration received reinforcements and launched the charge with twelve battalions against the French positions at Netstal. However, the French still resisted by fortifying themselves in the village and managed to destroy the bridges over the Linth shortly before the Russians took it over.

Meanwhile, there was also fighting in the rearguard, where Rosenberg, who commanded a total of 11,000 men, was attacked by Masséna. Suvorov ordered the Russian general to hold out at all costs while Bagration fought to clear the road to the east from the French. The French were determined not to allow the Russians to leave the valley: Lecourbe's divisions closed the road to them from behind along the Reuss by cutting the supply lines; Masséna recalled some of Mortier's divisions from Zurich to position them at Altdorf and part of Soult's divisions at Weesen to block the Linth Valley exit. Despite the efforts of the French, the Russians repelled all the assaults by counterattacking with bayonets. The battle was particularly bloody on the stone bridge across the Muota River, since then called Suworow-brücke ("Suvorov Bridge"), and from which several Frenchmen plunged into the waters because of the crush. On the evening of October 1, the French retreated toward Schwyz pressed by the Cossacks.

At the same time Bagration reestablished a bridge at Netstal and, organizing his forces into two columns, marched along both banks of the Linth toward Näfels, which was held firmly by Molitor with three battalions and four cannons and whose positions were protected on the right flank by cliffs and on the left by the river. Although Bagration succeeded in pushing the French back out of the town, the attack on the enemy's main positions failed, giving the French an opportunity to receive reinforcements from the Swiss militia and counterattack to retake the town with troops stationed at Mollis. On this occasion Molitor harangued the Swiss by recalling a historic victory they had achieved centuries earlier in the same places against the Austrian oppressor:

Do not forget, my comrades, that on April 9, 1388, your ancestors, animated by a yearning for freedom, brought back to these places a memorable victory over the Austrians, who had poured into the valley plundering Nettstal, Näfels and Mollis (...), killing 2,500, capturing 11 banners and losing only 53 men. My comrades! Emulate those brave men! Free your country from the foreign hordes!

— Molitor to the Swiss militia

However, Bagration tenaciously returned to assault the village on several occasions held back first by the Swiss and then finally stopped by the arrival of Gazan's troops after Näfels had changed hands several times in the same day. At 9 p.m., after sixteen hours of hard fighting, Suvorov ordered Bagration to disengage the moment the village was occupied by Russia, leaving the French on their initial positions. Both sides shouted victory, but in reality the day had ended in almost nothing — the Russians arrived near Glarus but the French closed off all avenues of approach to them toward Zurich — apart from showing the skill and valor of both commanders. According to the prominent Russian biographer of Suvorov Alexander Petrushevsky, at the withdrawal of the Russian troops Gazan moved all his forces to the attack and himself led the grenadiers into bayonet combat; but the French were repulsed, and Bagration's troops retreated quietly towards Netstal.

Bagration's vanguard spent the night of October 1 to 2 around Glarus, but it was not until October 4 that the entire army could assemble there, and on the same day Suvorov convened a new council of war.

== The retreat ==
=== The March to Panix ===
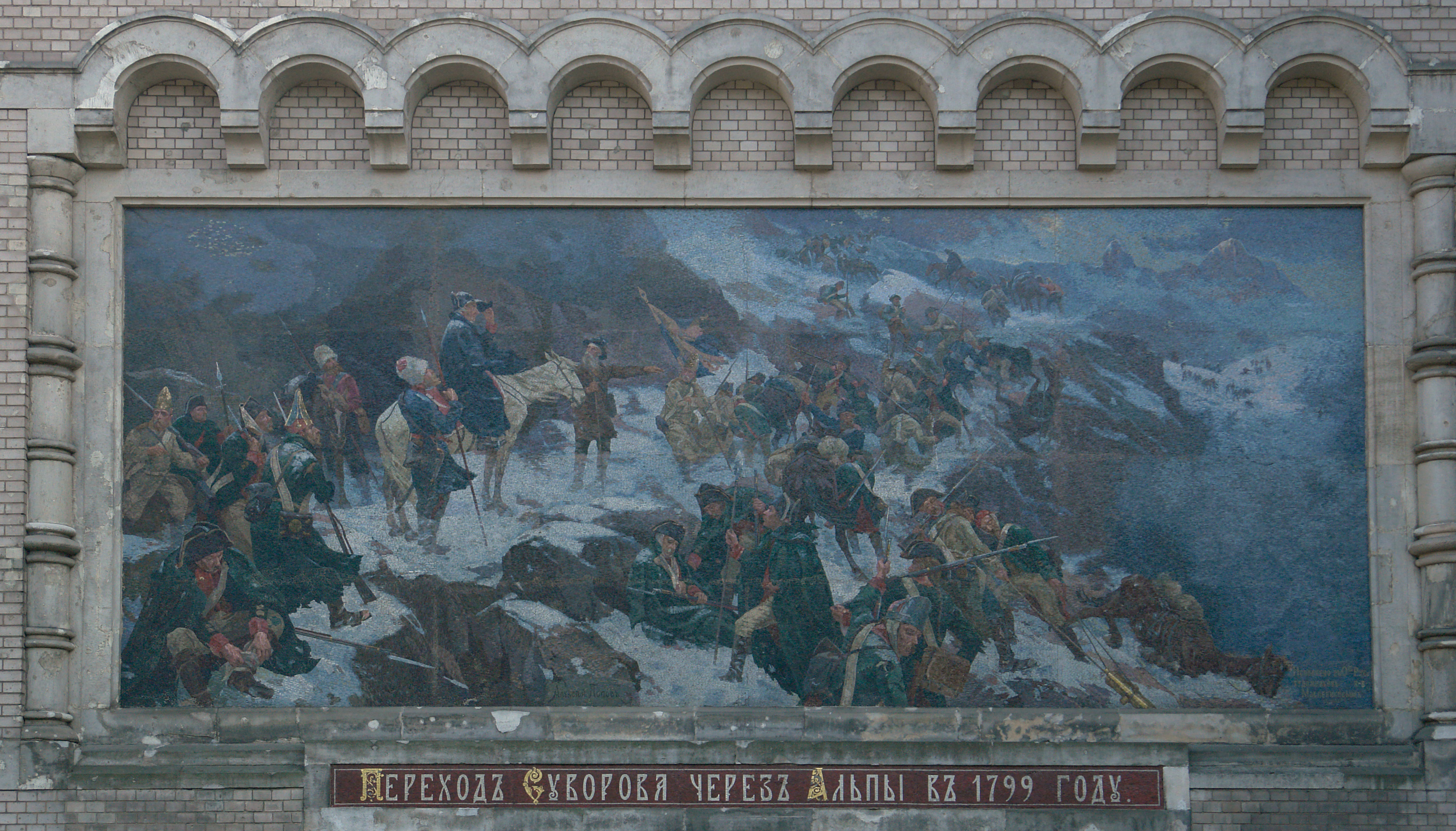
Suvorov's crossing of the Alps, 1904 mosaic on the exterior wall of the Suvorov Museum in St. Petersburg

Suvorov wanted to stick to the original plan and thus break through the French positions at Näfels, go along the Lake Walenstadt and march to Weesen to rejoin the other Austrian troops in Switzerland. Austrian officers supported this strategy, convinced that it was the best way to reach Sargans and the military warehouses there so as to resupply the army, now at the end of its strength and also lacking ammunition as well as supplies. But Prince Konstantin and senior Russian officers objected, convinced that the only way to rejoin the Allies was to outflank the French forces by heading south to Schwanden, then up through Elm and over the Panix Pass to reach and cross the Anterior Rhine valley to Maienfeld, south of Liechtenstein. In the end, eight of the ten generals on the general staff approved the "Russian proposal." Opting for such a decision, i.e., a march along a route devoid of enemy troops, did not suit the Russian field marshal's temperament, but his assent perhaps provides an idea of what must have been, even in his eyes, the poor conditions in which his men, who, despite the extreme sacrifices he constantly demanded, used to call him "little father," were living. The Austrian General Auffenberg, although his troops had been engaged in far less fighting than the Russian troops, had written in his report of October 1 that his brigade was now completely without ammunition, money, bread and largely without boots.

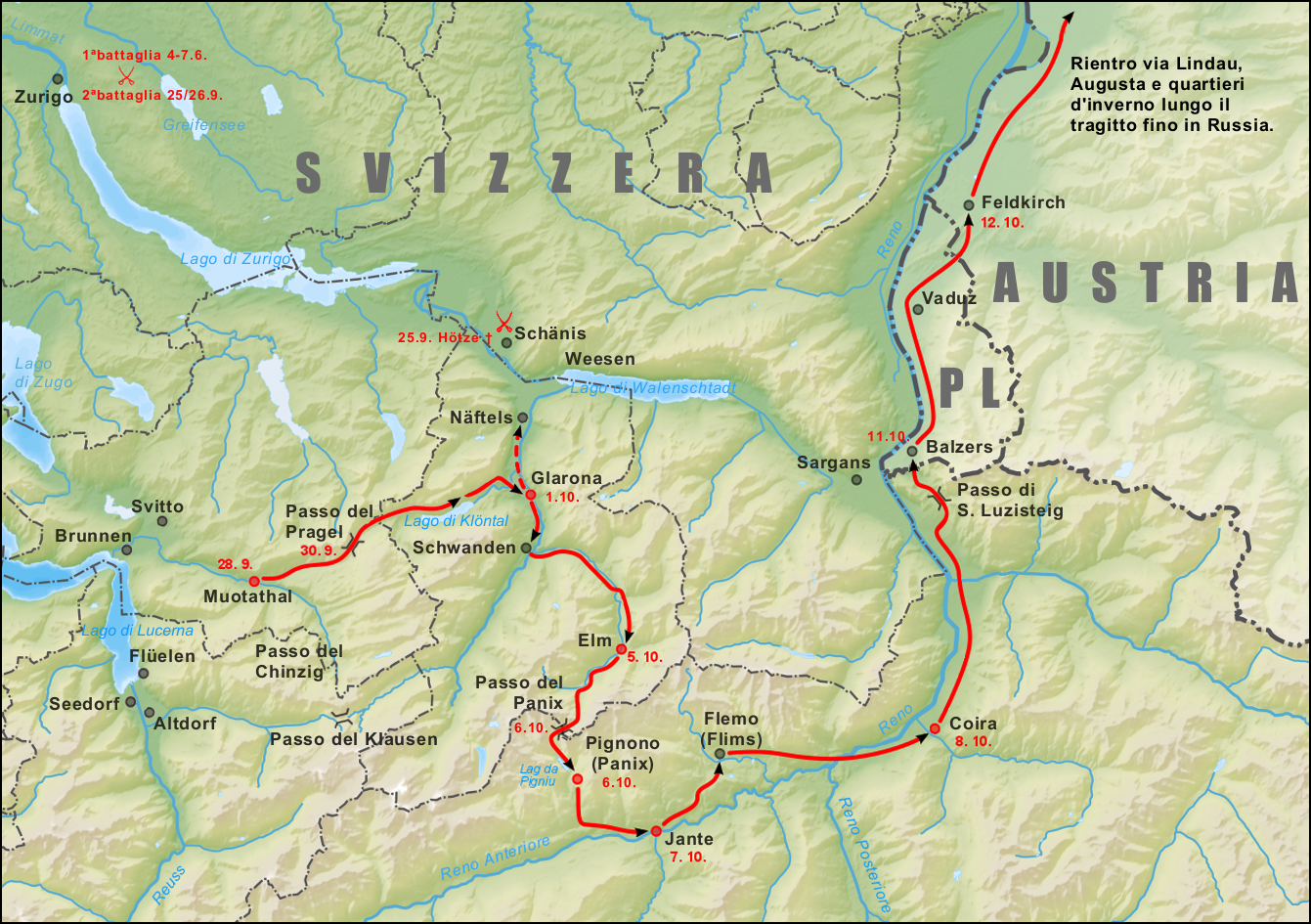
Route followed by Suvorov's troops from Muotathal to the winter quarters in Bavaria

On the night of October 4–5, under snow mixed with freezing rain, the march south toward Panix began. This time Bagration was left in the rear guard with his 1,800 surviving men of whom, he later recalled, only 250 were able to fight. The first to move was General Miloradovich, followed by General Otto Wilhelm Hristoforovich Derfelden and Rosenberg's troops. Suvorov was forced to abandon about 1,300 seriously wounded and ill men to the French, commending their fate to the humanity of the enemy in a letter left on purpose for Masséna to take care of them. The conditions of the march would be even worse than before. The Mother Superior of the Mutten convent, where Suvorov's staff had spent the night, testified, "It was pathetic to see how these people were forced to march so hard and barefoot across the Pragel, under a heavy rain mixed with snow. Only the general (adjutant) had his horse, everyone else was left behind."

As soon as they became aware of the Russian retreat, the French took the initiative to try to encircle Suvorov and cut off his escape route: Loison moved toward Schwanden; Mortier from Pragel toward Glarus to blockade the valley; General Gazan sent a brigade from Mollis toward Sool (south of Glarus) and three more from Netstal in pursuit of Bagration. On the morning of October 5 Gazan's 10th Hunter Regiment attacked Bagration's Cossacks forcing him to slow his march while the arrival of French artillery forced him to stop and deploy along the narrow valley and, being short of ammunition, to order three desperate bayonet assaults. During the day Bagration's rearguard had to sustain about 20 attacks to hold back the enemy and save the entire army from certain defeat.

On the night of the 5th and 6th the army camped near Elm, in the cold, without food and subjected to constant attacks by the French. At 2:00 a.m. Suvorov preferred to move while the French continued to pound Bagration's troops who managed to hold them back but suffered continuous losses. The freezing night march cost the lives of several soldiers and about two hundred were missing captured by the French. As soon as the Russians took the Panix route, the French broke off their pursuit. Bagration was able to tally the losses, which he found amounted to about eight hundred men taken prisoners, four cannons, a treasure chest containing twenty thousand francs, which the French commander Lenard later distributed to his battalion, and numerous horses and mules; he had, however, managed to protect the army's rear.

=== Crossing the Panix Pass and arriving in Chur ===
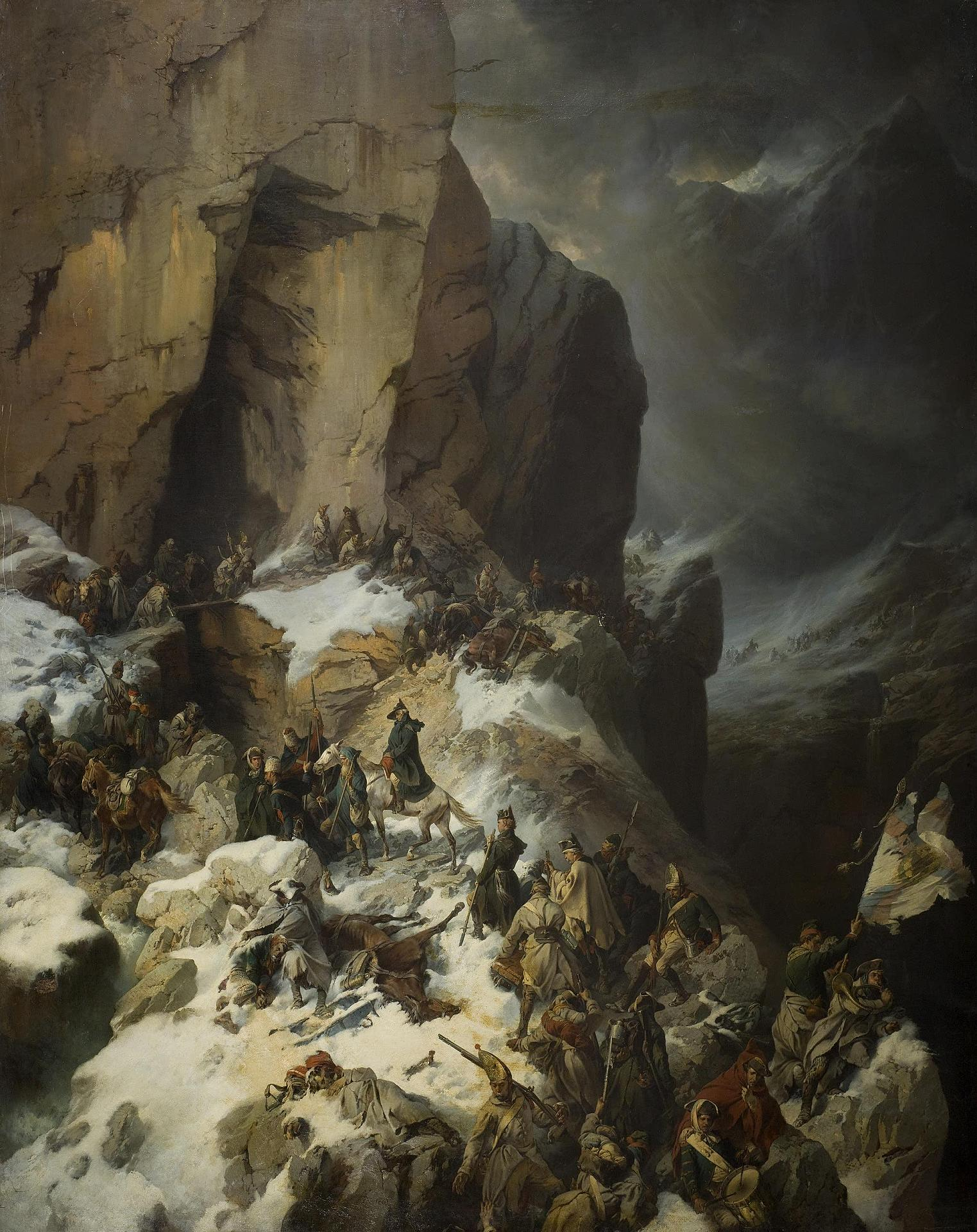
Suvorov crossing the Panix Pass, painting by Alexander Kotzebue

On October 6, the Russians began the climb to Panix, at an altitude of 2,407 m. All artillery had to be abandoned and, climbing with snow above the knee on the narrow, winding paths over precipices, three hundred mules were also lost. Édouard Gachot in his 1904 book Histoire militaire de Masséna: La campagne d'Helvétie (1799), extracted from the memoirs of surviving officers and from reports from the Russian war archives, describes at length and in great detail the enormous hardships and drama suffered by the Russian army during the crossing. The grueling march was carried out almost continuously, even at night, and cost the lives of those who, exhausted, sick or wounded, were no longer able to stand on the narrow path, made invisible by snow and slippery by ice. Several men abandoned backpacks and rifles along the way, and the weakest simply allowed themselves to die by falling asleep.

According to sources, Suvorov shared with his men all the hardships of the exhausting march and kept constantly cheering them on, picking up those who abandoned their weapons or only complained, and, although badly dressed, in order to show his endurance and try to extract the last energies from his exhausted troops he repeatedly refused the mantle offered to him by his orderly. He climbed on foot together with the soldiers to the top of the pass where, on the advice of Grand Duke Konstantin, he made use of the wood from the spears of the Cossacks to light a fire and prepare tea for the troops; on the way down, the Russian captain Grjasew later recounted admiringly in his diary, "He was sitting on a Cossack horse, and I saw him trying to free himself from the hands of two horsemen at his side who were trying to support him on the march and lead his horse (. ..) He kept saying, 'Leave me, leave me, I must go alone.'" To the generals surrounding him he said:

Do you hear how they praise me? These are the same men who also praised me like this in Turkey and Poland.

— Suvorov

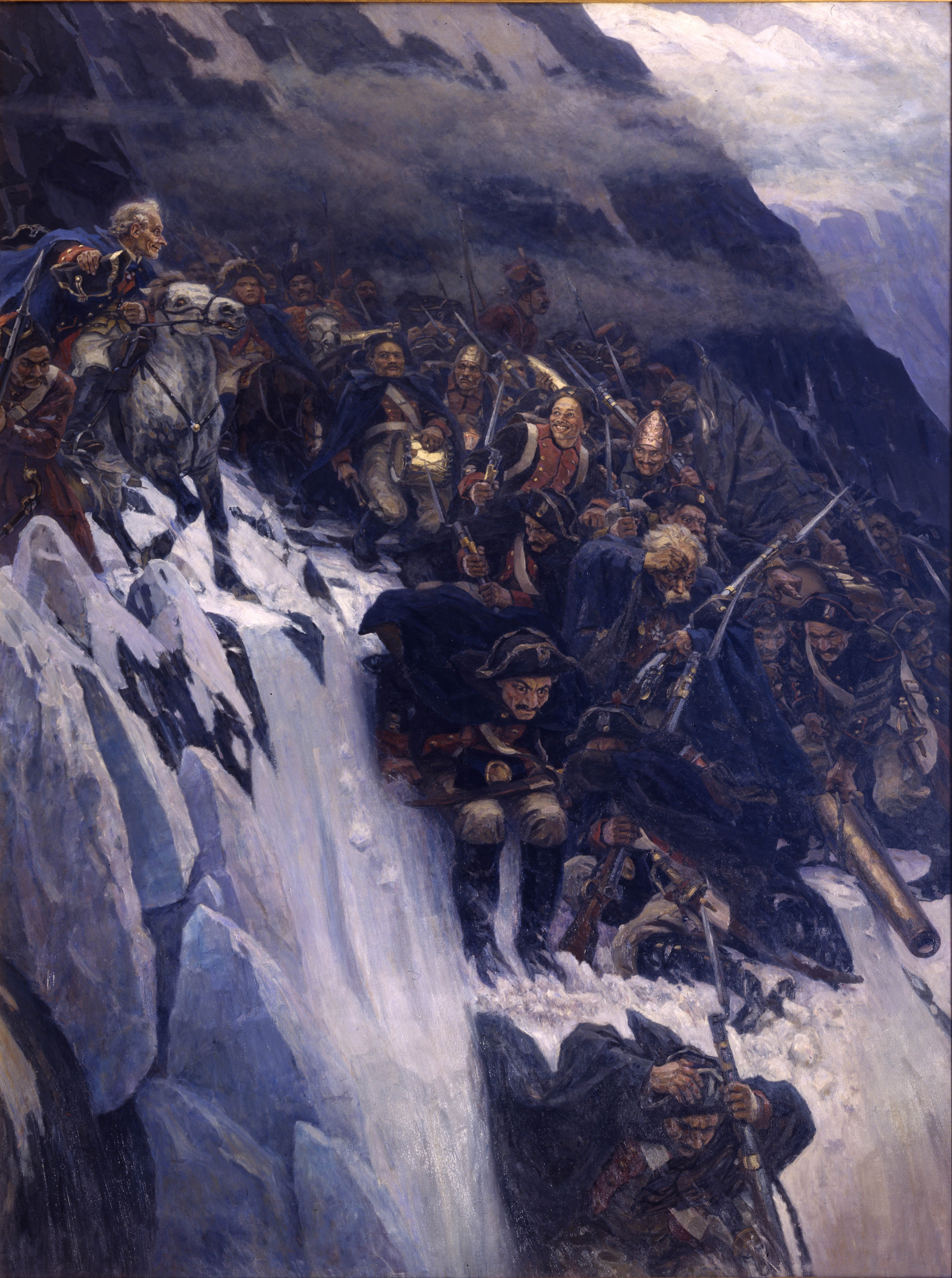
Suvorov crossing the Alps, 1899 by Vasily Surikov

As soon as the vanguard reached the pass's ridge, it was hit by a very violent blizzard of hail and frozen snow that prevented the scouts from getting their bearings, causing them to risk falling into cliffs and precipices. Before finding a smooth way down thanks to the intervention of local people, several groups dispersed in the search. On October 7, the Russians arrived at the first Pigniu chalets and after a brief bivouac were able to begin their descent to Ilanz and safety. Here, Suvorov, finally feeling that he was no longer hunted, rested his men for another night and on the 9th moved toward the Rhine and then toward Chur where he arrived on October 10, also taking with him 1,400 French prisoners. He was left with 14,000 men and of these only 10,000 barely able to march and fight, the rest were consumed by fevers or blinded by inflammation of the eyes; the sotnias were reduced to a mere twenty or so cavalrymen disputing four or five surviving horses and badly in shape; the artillery was all lost, a third of the troop had lost their weapons and those that remained were rusted and unserviceable; the bayonets blunted and the uniforms were unrecognizable.

Each infantry regiment was reorganized into a battalion, the cavalry regiments into the same number of squadrons, and, equipped with a convoy of five hundred beasts of burden, the army headed through Balzers, Vaduz and Feldkirch to Altenstadt. On October 22 Tsar Paul withdrew from the coalition and recalled Suvorov, who by then publicly accused the Austrians of betraying him. On October 25, the forces of Suvorov, Korsakov, and the Prince of Condé gathered at Landau and began small marches back to winter quarters in Bohemia, where they arrived in January 1800, finally concluding the Swiss campaign.

== Reasons for the defeat ==
After just under a month of grueling marches and sixteen days of fighting, Suvorov had lost over 5,000 men, of whom 1,600 people were killed and more than 3,500 were wounded; the infantry suffered 28,4 percent losses. The Russians retained most of their army, and the French controlled Switzerland exactly as they did before the campaign began (Note: News had already reached Chur on October 10 that the French had reoccupied the Gotthard and were advancing further into the Rhine valley. Soult theoretically had from Disentis/Mustér the road paved to the temporary Russo-Austrian quarterings as well.). As early as October 22, Tsar Paul I, in his letter to Emperor Francis II officially announcing Russia's exit from the coalition, focused the main reasons for the Russian defeat on the removal of Archduke Charles from Switzerland before the reunification of Suvorov's army with Korsakov's had been completed:

"Your Majesty must already be aware of the consequences that resulted with the removal from Switzerland of the army under the command of Archduke Charles, which was done in opposition to all the reasons for which it was to remain there until the conjunction of the Field Marshal Prince Italysky with Lieutenant-General Rimsky Korsakoff had been carried out. (...)"

— (Paul I to Francis II, October 22, 1799)

Indeed, in the first days of August, Archduke Charles had already received at his quartering in Kloten, north of Zurich, a letter from Francis II informing him of the coalition's new strategies and ordering him to leave Switzerland. However, the same letter probably did not reach Suvorov until August 25 or 27, so he was still convinced that he had to continue his campaign in Italy when, at least twenty days in advance, the archduke had already begun preparations to move. On September 2, when he decided to obey following the order received directly from the tsar, Suvorov still thought he could coordinate his maneuver with Archduke Charles. Informed at last that the latter had already left the country, he was deeply disconcerted by "the disastrous news about Archduke Charles's retreat from Switzerland." Between September 15 and 20, after the vain wait in Taverne for the mules with the supplies needed for the march to Switzerland, he now explicitly accused Melas and the Austrians of cowardice and of having plotted treason against him.

Although it was immediately clear that the campaign in Switzerland had been based more on political and diplomatic calculations by the Austrians than on proper strategic assessments, or rather against the military decisions that Suvorov had already made, it cannot but be blamed on the Russian general for at least underestimating the difficulties of the campaign entrusted to him. Probably his sometimes too impulsive and impetuous temperament, despite his age, led him to an overly optimistic assessment of environmental conditions, the strength and capacity of the opposing troops on the Alpine passes, and his men's chances. To give an idea of Suvorov's spirit in the days immediately preceding the campaign, it is sufficient to report two exemplary episodes. To the Austrian General Weyrother, who summarized to him the plans for the attack on the St. Gotthard complete with a hypothesis of retreat, he ordered, "Cross out the word retreat!"; to a courier from Korsakov, who asked him what the new orders were, he simply replied with the words, "Defeat the French!".

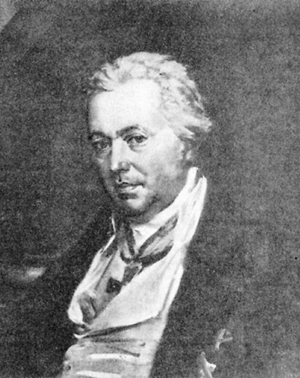
General Alexander Korsakov

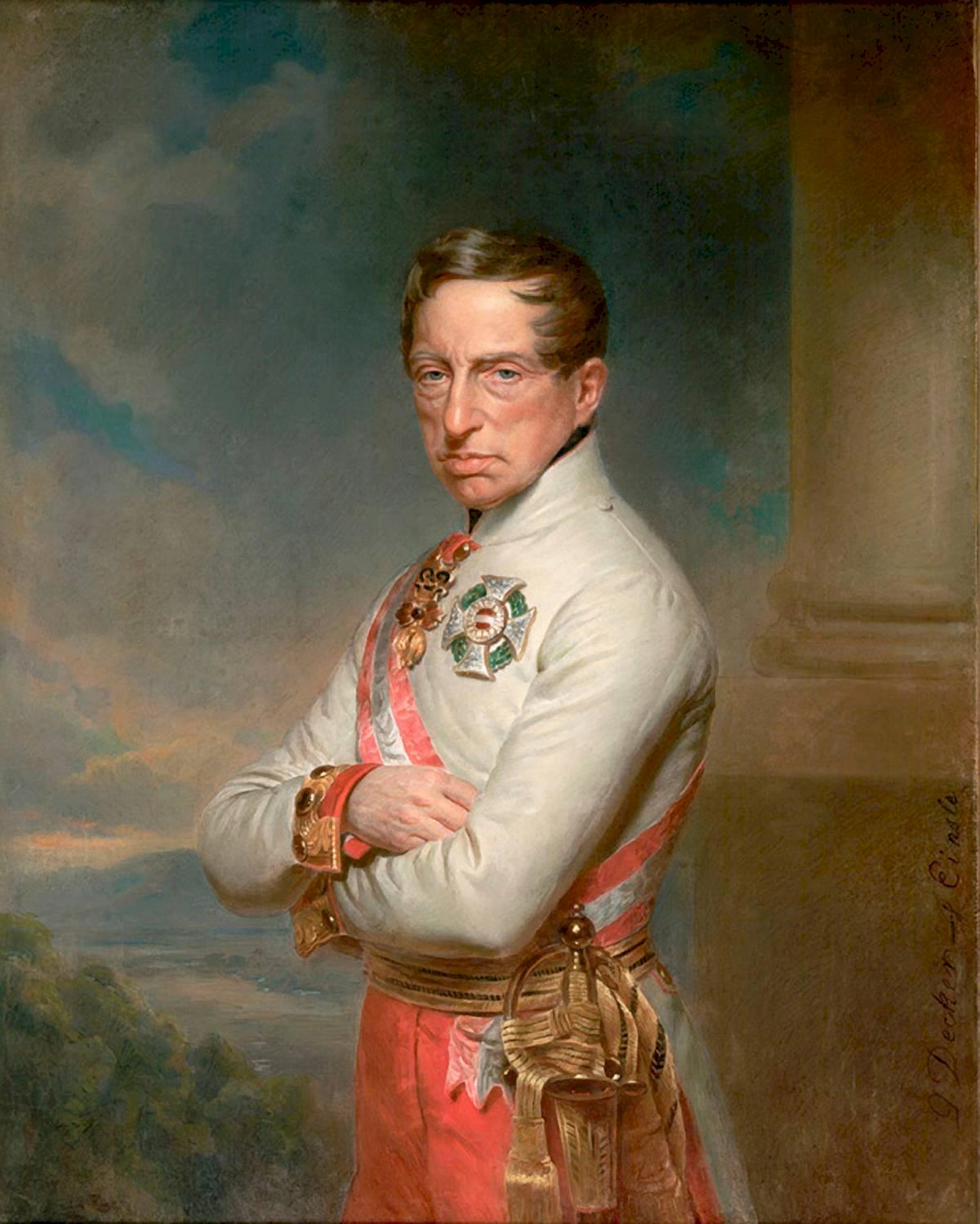
Archduke Charles of Habsburg-Teschen

On September 20 Suvorov had approved General Hotze's operational proposal to join him, moving from the St. Gotthard by forced marches on narrow mountain routes along the Reuss valley, to bypass Masséna from Schwyz and liberate Lucerne. The success of this plan would certainly have enormous consequences for the operational situation in Switzerland, but the successful outcome depended on the simultaneous success of a whole series of actions to be carried out in coordination and the correctness of all initial assessments. It was, for example, necessary that the offensive action of Korsakov's and Hotze's troops on the Linth-Limmat take place simultaneously with Suvorov's arrival at least in Schwyz. The failure of even one of the planned actions or unforeseen changes in environmental, logistical or tactical conditions could have resulted in the failure of the entire operation. And that was what precisely happened and on which all subsequent criticism of the old general focused: the Russians had to wait four days for Austrian supplies, which arrived late and proved insufficient; weather and environmental conditions were almost always unfavorable when not prohibitive; his decision to march along the Reuss did not take into account the resilience of the French troops, who on the one hand harshly contested every inch of territory forcing him in several battles into fierce fighting that further slowed him down, and on the other hand constantly threatened his supply line, for which he was totally dependent on the Austrians, interrupting it often even with attacks from reduced forces. Finally, Masséna proved to be a brilliant and capable commander who routed Korsakov and Hotze's troops in Zurich while Suvorov was still on Lake Lucerne, undecided what to do, and then left the coalition troops no choice but to retreat to the mountains and then evacuate Switzerland.

His greatest detractors later proved to be precisely Archduke Charles, to whose premature retreat Suvorov ascribed most of the campaign's failure, and General Korsakov, whose immediate defeat suffered at Masséna's hands nevertheless thwarted any vague hopes of possible success. Archduke Charles severely criticized the campaign plan from the standpoint of supplies and logistical support:

An inadequately prepared start of the whole maneuver, starting from uncertain assumptions that gave no guarantees even for the case of a retreat.

— Archduke Charles

In his memoirs Korsakov blamed Suvorov for the exaggerated efforts required of his men and went so far as to place sole responsibility for the failure of the campaign on him:

Daily routes were provided for Marshal Suvorov's and General Hotze's troops so that, even without the slightest enemy resistance, they could not have been traversed.

— Korsakov's memoirs

Moreover, he added that even in the event that Suvorov had eventually reached Schwyz, the fate of the battle could not have changed since he would not have been able to supply him, finding himself in a dire situation.

It was then probably the testimony of Korsakov, who had preceded the elderly commander to St. Petersburg by immediately putting Suvorov in a bad light at the tsarist court by pointing him out as the only person responsible for the defeat, that prompted Paul I to welcome him coldly and not give the newly appointed "generalissimo" and his army the honor of a triumphal entry into the Russian capital as he had previously promised him.

== Legacy of the campaign ==
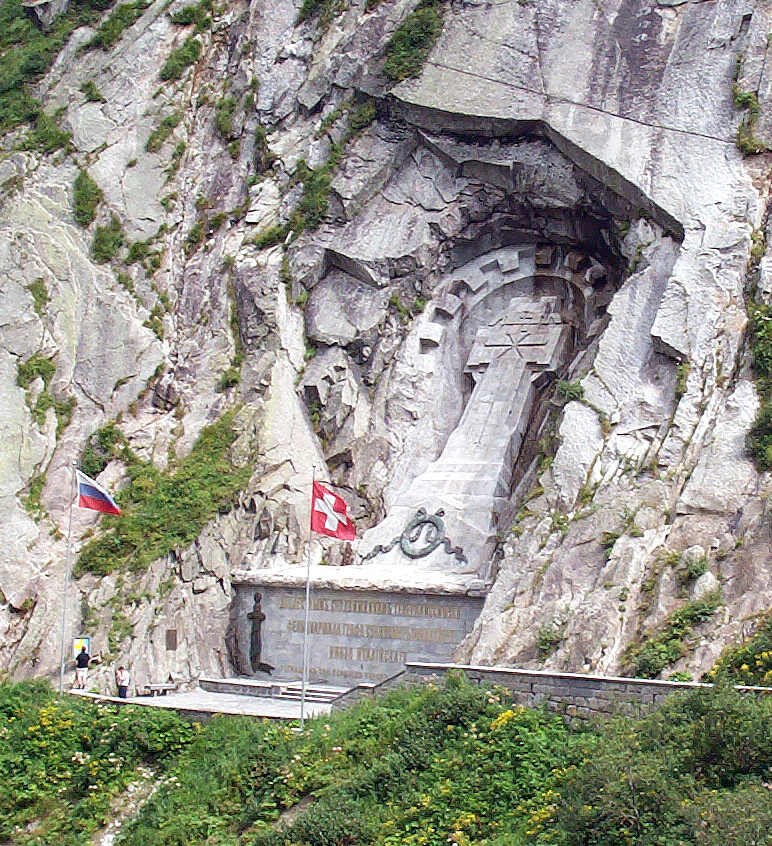
Suvorov monument commemorating the battle at the Schöllenen Gorge on September 25, 1799

Subsequently, in 1807, talking to a Russian general, Masséna remembered Suvorov, praised his military abilities and said that he would never forgive him for crossing accomplished by him in Switzerland.

Despite its obvious failure, the Swiss campaign would nonetheless add new posthumous prestige to Suvorov because of his dramatic and heroic character, especially in Russian culture where he is still regarded as an equal of Xenophon, Hannibal or Julius Caesar: as early as 1801 Tsar Paul I ordered the first of a long series of monuments erected in his honor in his homeland. In Switzerland, where he is remembered as the liberator from French occupation, right by the Devil's Bridge in the Schöllenen Gorge below Andermatt, there has been since 1899 a large and impressive monument carved entirely out of rock dedicated to the feat of the Russian general and his men.

The Swiss campaign was held in high regard by contemporaries and often remembered by historians. Recognizing the desperate situation Suvorov's army had found itself in, the famous Prussian general, writer and military theorist Carl von Clausewitz called the successful retreat "a miracle" a few years later. Friedrich Engels wrote in his 1859 pamphlet "Po und Rhein" ("Po and Rhine") that the crossing of the Panix during the campaign conducted under the leadership of Alexander Suvorov "had been the greatest military undertaking ever among those engaged in crossing the Alpine passes." The British historian General C. Callwell pointed out that the Russian commander, being himself a man of the plain and leading soldiers who had never fought in mountainous conditions, managed to conduct the most outstanding mountain campaign in the history of warfare. According to him, Suvorov's Swiss campaign can find a comparison only if one looks back to the days of Hannibal. "The failure of this campaign," later wrote Russian statesman Dmitry Milyutin, "would have brought Russian troops more honor than the most brilliant of victories."

== See also ==
- Italian and Swiss expedition
- War of the Second Coalition
- Alexander Suvorov
- André Masséna

== Bibliography ==
- AA.VV. (1857). Rettificazioni istoriche dedicate alla Gazzetta Ufficiale di Milano. Florence: Tip. G. Favale e Comp.
- Botta, Carlo (1834) [1824]. Storia d'Italia dal 1789 al 1814 (in ventisette libri). Lugano: Giuseppe Ruggia e C. OCLC 427865342.
- Chandler, David G., ed. (1988). I marescialli di Napoleone. Milan: Rizzoli. ISBN 88-17-33251-8.
- Coppi, Antonio (1824). Annali d'Italia dal 1750. Vol. 2. Stamperia de Romanis.
- Hüffer, Hermann (1905). Der Krieg des Jahres 1799 und die zweite Koalition. Gotha: F.A. Perthes.
- Gachot, Édouard (1904). Histoire militaire de Masséna: la campagne d'Helvétie (1799). Perrin et cie.
- Mathiez, Albert; Lefebvre, Georges (1992). La rivoluzione francese. Einaudi.
- Marie Philippe, Léger comte de Laverne (1809). Histoire du feld-maréchal Souvarof: liée à celle de son temps, avec des considérations sur les principaux événemens politiques et militaires auxquels la Russie a pris part pendant le XVIIIe siècle. Chez Desenne, Lenormant, Au bureau des Annales, de l'impr. d'A. Égron.
- Mikaberidze, Alexander (2003). The lion of the russian army. Florida State University.
- Mikhailovsky-Danilevsky, Alexander; Milyutin, Dmitry (1852). Istoriia voini Rossii s Frantsiei v 1799 godu. St. Petersburg: Tip. Shtaba voenno-uchebnykh zavedenii.
- Aleksandrovič Orlov, Nikolaj (1892). Suvorov: Razbor voennych dějstvij Suvorova v Italii v 1799 godu. St. Petersburg: Trenke i Fjusno.
- Nikolaevna Osipova, Margarita (2005). Velikiĭ russkiĭ reformator feldmarshal: D.A. Mili︠u︡tin. St. Petersburg: Anumi Fortitudo. ISBN 978-5-86090-092-9.
- C. Tucker, Spencer (2009). A Global Chronology of Conflict: From the Ancient World to the Modern Middle East. ABC-CLIO. ISBN 978-1-85109-672-5.
- Rostunov, Ivan I. (1989). Генералиссимус Александр Васильевич Суворов: Жизнь и полководческая деятельность [Generalissimo Alexander Suvorov: Life and military activity]. Moscow: Voenizdat. ISBN 5-203-00046-8.
- Vicari, Francesco (1999). "La campagna di Suvorov attraverso le Alpi svizzere nel 1799" (PDF). Rivista militare della Svizzera italiana. No. 4.
- Rossi, Giulio (1908). "Suwaroff in Svizzera". Corriere del Ticino. No. 9–16. Museo del Malcantone, Curio. Archived from the original on October 18, 2014.
