= Italian and Swiss expedition of 1799 =

Suvorov's 1799 campaigns in Italy and Switzerland

Italian and Swiss expedition
- Part of the War of the Second Coalition
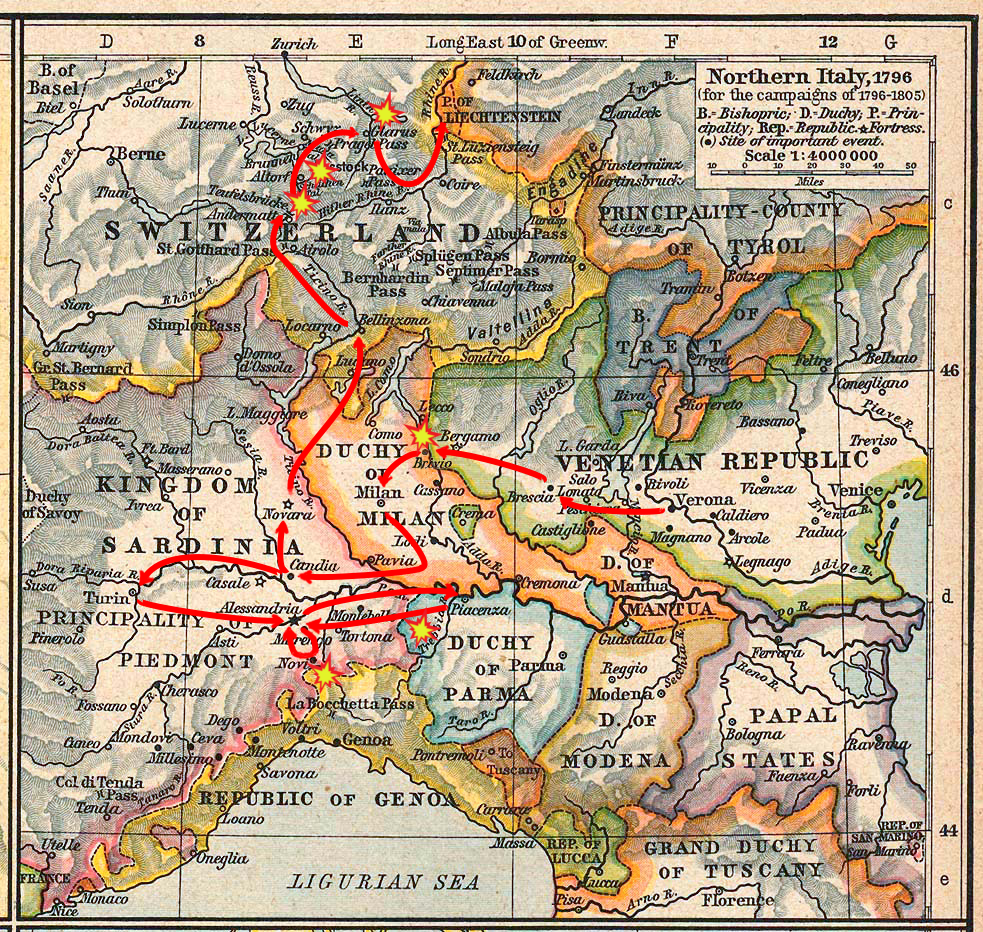
- Map of Suvorov's campaign in Italy and Switzerland
| Date | March – December 1799 |
| Location | Italy, Switzerland, Germany and Austria |
| Result | Russo-Austrian victory in Italy; French victory in Switzerland |

Belligerents
| (French First Republic) French Republic (Note: With Polish Legion); • Piedmontese Republic; • Cisalpine Republic; • Helvetic Republic | Habsburg monarchy (Russian Empire) Russian Empire; Swiss rebels |

Commanders and leaders
| (French First Republic) Barthélemy Joubert † (French First Republic) Jean Moreau (French First Republic) André Masséna (French First Republic) Jean-de-Dieu Soult (French First Republic) Étienne Macdonald (French First Republic) Barthélemy Schérer (French First Republic) Claude Lecourbe (Poland) Jan Dąbrowski | (Russian Empire) Alexander Suvorov (Russian Empire) Alexander Korsakov (Russian Empire) Andrei Rosenberg (Russian Empire) Konstantin Pavlovich (Habsburg monarchy) Michael von Melas (Habsburg monarchy) Friedrich von Hotze † (Habsburg monarchy) Franz Auffenberg (Habsburg monarchy) Paul Kray (Habsburg monarchy) Ferdinand Rovéréa |

Strength
| ? French ? Italians ? Helvetes ? Polish | 178,253 Austrians; 65,000 Russians ? Swiss rebels |

Casualties and losses
| In Italy: Unknown number of killed and wounded, 80,000 captured, 3,000 cannons, 200,000 guns | Unknown |

The Italian and Swiss expedition of 1799 involved two military campaigns undertaken by a combined Austro-Russian army under overall command of the Russian Marshal Alexander Suvorov against French forces in Piedmont, Lombardy, and Emilia (modern Italy) and the Helvetic Republic (present-day Switzerland). The expedition was part of the Italian campaigns of the French Revolutionary Wars in general, and the War of the Second Coalition in particular. It was one of 'two unprecedented Russian interventions in 1799', the other being the Anglo-Russian invasion of Holland (August–November 1799).

== Preparations ==
The expedition was primarily planned by British and Russian politicians and diplomats. Russia would provide troops that Britain would subsidise, and together they sought to encourage Austria to do most of the fighting (as it had about three-fourths of the would-be Second Coalition's land forces), pay for its own troops as well as supply the entire allied army, while maintaining Anglo-Russian strategic control over the campaign including Austria's war effort. Russia and especially Britain distrusted Austria because they were suspicious of the Habsburgs' territorial greed; they hoped to coax Austria into entering war with France out of self-defence and to help restore the pre-Revolutionary order in Europe without Austrian territorial expansion. Moreover, London was still in a bitter dispute with Vienna over a loan convention to pay off Austria's debts to Britain, and so it refused to subsidise the Austrian troops as well, even though the Habsburgs had barely recovered from the War of the First Coalition (1792–1797). According to Paul W. Schroeder (1987), Britain and Russia also 'deliberately fostered and exploited' the rivalry between Prussia and Austria to entice both to join the Second Coalition; Berlin would end up retaining its neutrality.

== Order of battle ==
=== Austrian forces ===
Convergence of French and Austrian armies on Ostrach near the Danube in March 1799

The Habsburg armies comprised some 75% of allied forces in the campaign.

Strength: 148,663 (178,253 when garrisons are included) in August 1799

=== Russian forces ===
65,000 Russian troops participated in the expedition. The Russian expeditionary force consisted of three corps.

- The first corps was that of Russian general Alexander Korsakov; it was originally planned to consist of 45,000 troops which were subsidised by Britain, but in the end it comprised only 24,000 soldiers. Korsakov's corps departed from Brest-Litovsk, marching via Opole, the Moravian Gate, Prague, crossing the Danube west of Regensburg, and entering Switzerland in order to confront a French army near Zürich. Its ultimate objective was to invade France through its weakly defended Alpine border.
- The second corps went from Brest-Litovsk via Kraków and Krems to Vienna – where Suvorov joined the troops and assumed overall command – and then across the Brenner Pass via Brescia to Milan (at 1,650 kilometres from Moscow).
- The third corps commanded by Andrei Rosenberg started in Kamenets-Podolskiy, marched via Lemberg across the Carpathian Mountains to Budapest, and passed Verona on the way to Turin.

=== French forces ===
- Army of the Danube (2 March – 11 December 1799; merged into the Army of the Rhine on 24 November 1799)

Strength: 25,000 troops (March 1799).
Commander: General Jourdan

- Army of Naples (armée de Naples)
- Army of Italy.

Strength: 53,581 (63,657 when garrisons are included) on 23 September 1799
Commanders:
- 12 March – 26 April 1799: General Schérer, as part of his overall command of the Army of Naples
- 27 April – 4 August 1799: General Moreau, as part of his overall command of the Army of Naples
- 5–15 August 1799: General Joubert, commander of both the Army of Italy and the Army of the Alps, killed at the battle of Novi
- 15 August – 20 September 1799: General Moreau
- 21 September – 30 December 1799: General Championnet

- Army of the Alps (created on 27 July 1799, merged into the Army of Italy on 29 August 1799).

Strength: 25,000 troops.
Commander: General Championnet

- Polish Legions

Commander: Jan Henryk Dąbrowski

== Italian campaign ==
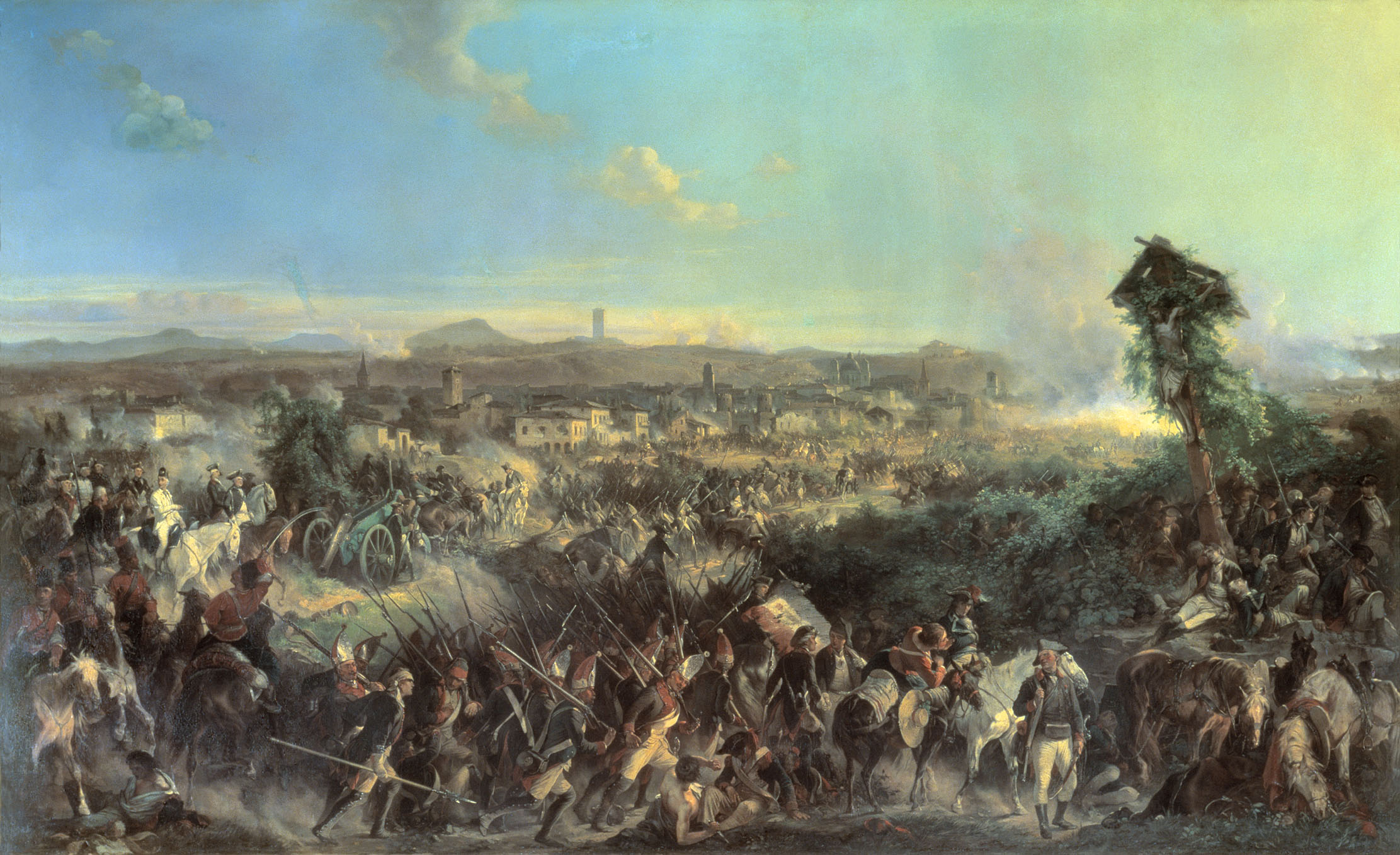
The Battle of Novi, an Alexander Kotzebue painting

Taking command on 19 April, Suvorov moved his army westwards in a rapid march towards the Adda River; covering over 480 kilometres (300 mi) in just eighteen days. On 27 April, he defeated the Army of Italy under Jean Victor Moreau at the Battle of Cassano. Soon afterward, Suvorov wrote to a Russian diplomat: "The Adda is a Rubicon, and we crossed it over the bodies of our enemies." On 29 April he entered Milan. Two weeks later, he moved on to Turin, having defeated Moreau yet again at Marengo.

From Naples, General MacDonald moved north to assist Moreau in June. Trapped between two armies, Suvorov decided to concentrate his whole force against MacDonald, beating the French at the Trebbia River (19 June). Informed of Moreau's approach, Suvorov ordered the Austrians to pursue the withdrawing French Army of Naples as it retreated towards the Riviera, while taking the fortified city of Mantua on 28 July. Moreau did not dare to attack Suvorov because of MacDonald's defeat and pulled back. The remnants of MacDonald's army joined Moreau.

Moreau was relieved of command, to be replaced by Joubert. Pushing through the Bocchetta Pass, Joubert was defeated and killed in battle with Suvorov at Novi (15 August) to the north of Genoa. Years later when Moreau, who was also present at Novi, was asked about Suvorov, he replied: "What can you say of a general so resolute to a superhuman degree, and who would perish himself and let his army perish to the last man rather than retreat a single pace."

Because of the Hofkriegsrat, Suvorov's de facto superior, the Russian general had to deal with sieges and blockades of North-Italian fortresses, instead of his intentions to conduct a lightning campaign: driving the French out of Italy, invading their homeland as quickly as possible. Suvorov was used by the Austrian government to seize Italy for itself. "War is a means in the hands of politicians to achieve state goals. The Austrian government cared little for the interests of Emperor Paul. Austrian statesmen had an extremely myopic understanding of military affairs." Seeking to secure their control of Italy, they thought that capturing fortresses, establishing their own administration, stationing small garrisons everywhere capable of keeping the population in check, and so on, would be enough to realize their dreams. They were mistaken: "with a single wave of Bonaparte's hand in 1800, their entire edifice collapsed," and they lost the conquests secured by Suvorov's victories. "They could not understand that the broad plans of Suvorov, who had a profound understanding of the art of war, aimed at inflicting such blows on the enemy that would shake his power, ensured conquests in the most reliable way, and were therefore very advantageous for the Habsburg Empire." Suvorov's principles contradicted the "cabinet war" waged by the Hofkriegsrat.

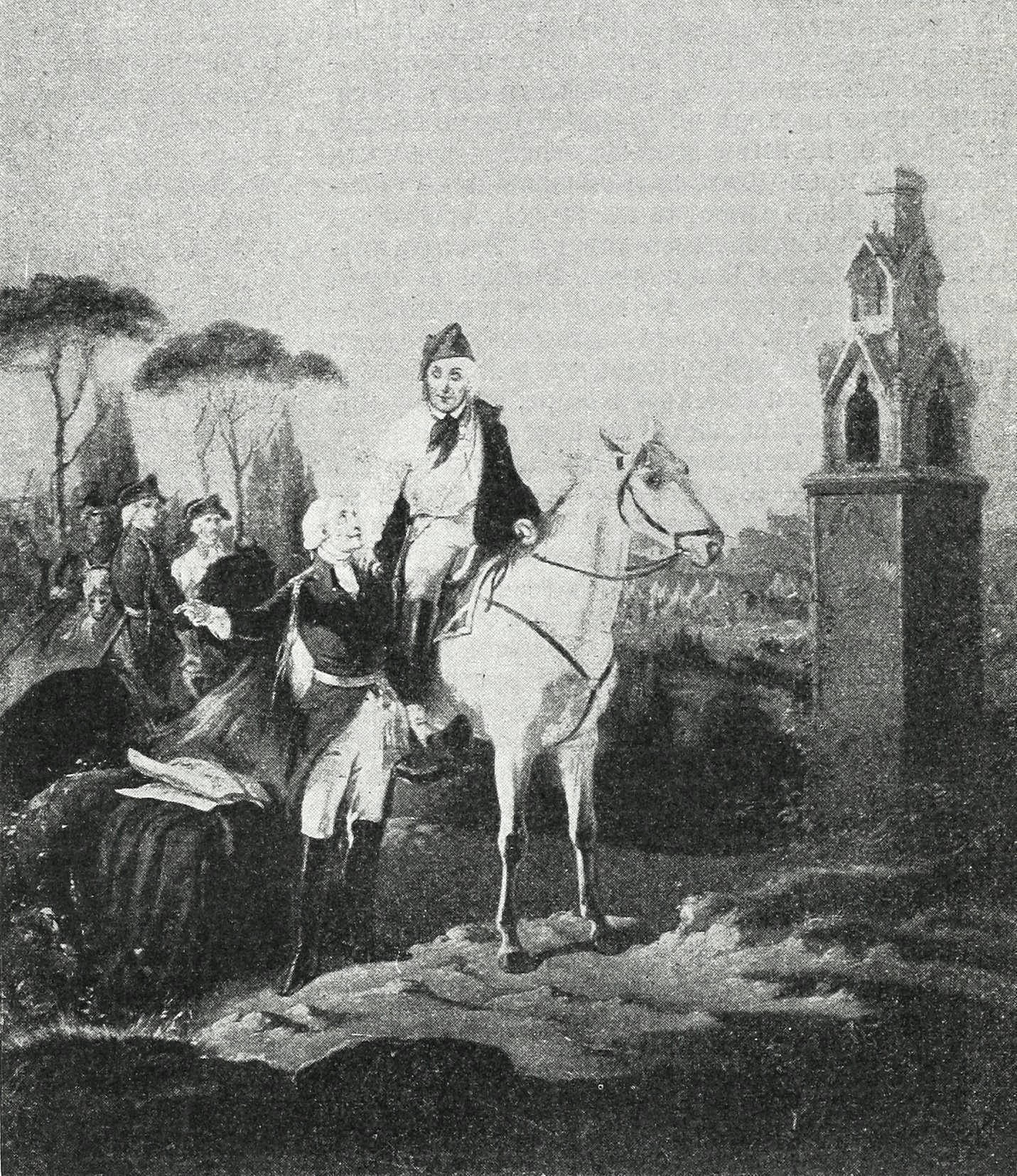
Suvorov in Italy in 1799

== Swiss campaign ==
Battles in southern Germany and northern Switzerland

In 1798, Paul I gave General Korsakov command of an expeditionary force of 30,000 men sent to Germany to join Austria in the fight against the French Republic. At the beginning of 1799, the force was diverted to drive the French out of Switzerland. Leaving Russia in May, Korsakov reached Stockach in 90 days. With 29,463 men, his command then marched to Zürich to join up with the 25,000-man corps of Austrian general Friedrich von Hotze, who had defeated the French army at the Battle of Winterthur on 27 May 1799. It was expected that Suvorov's army would join them from Italy after marching through the Alps, but terrain and enemy action held up Suvorov's advance. In the meantime, Korsakov waited near Zürich in a relaxed state of over-confidence. Taking full advantage of this, the French under André Masséna attacked on 25 September 1799, winning a decisive victory in the Second Battle of Zürich and forcing Korsakov to withdraw rapidly to Schaffhausen, despite almost no pursuit by the French. Suvorov was making his way across the Devil's Bridge that day. Korsakov then took up a position on the east of the Rhine in the Dörflingen Camp between Schaffhausen and Constance, remaining there while Masséna was left free to deal with Suvorov, but suffered a heavy defeat in the Muottental. His left under Condé was driven from Constance on 7 October, on the same day he advanced from Büsingen against Schlatt, but was eventually driven back by Masséna, abandoning his hold on the left bank of the Rhine. He joined Suvorov's survivors at Lindau on 18 October, and was shortly after relieved of command.

== Outcome ==
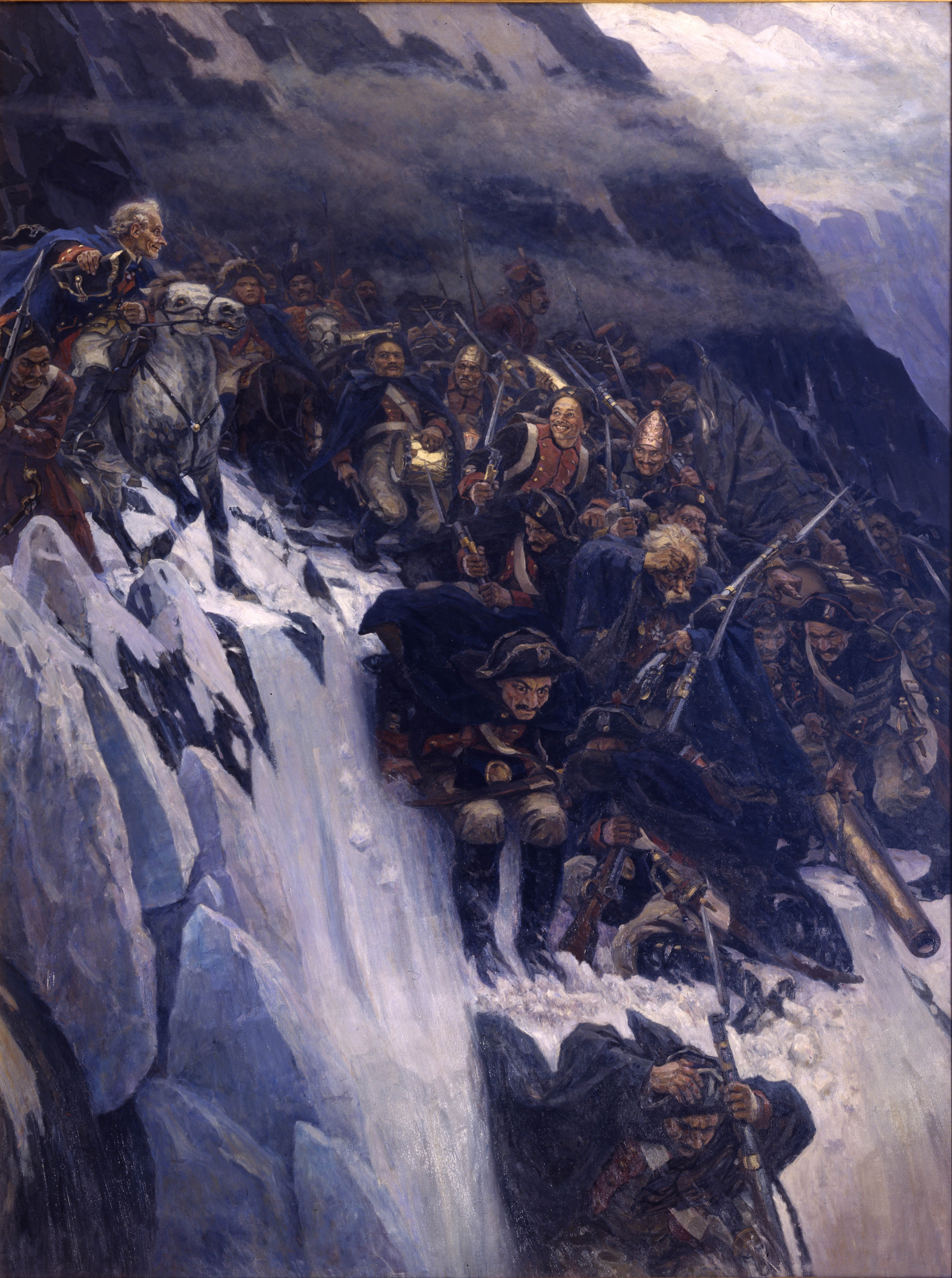
Suvorov crossing the Alps. Heroifying painting by Vasily Surikov (1899).

Suvorov succeeded in rescuing his army 'by a brilliant but costly fighting march across the Alps into eastern Switzerland'. However, the defeat of Korsakov's army at the Second Battle of Zürich proved to be decisive: it destroyed any hopes of invading France and restoring the Bourbon monarchy and, along with the failed Anglo-Russian invasion of Holland and rising tensions with Austria (which escalated during the Austro-Russian occupation of Piedmont), Tsar Paul I became so enraged that he pulled Russia out of the Second Coalition and the Russian troops were withdrawn. The tsar's decision to abandon the Coalition dismayed most Russian leaders.

According to the conventional view amongst historians by the 1980s, Russia's withdrawal in late 1799 was crucial to the eventual collapse of the Second Coalition and the French final victory in March 1802. However, Schroeder (1987) argued that '[t]he chances for an Austro-British victory were little worse without Russia than with it considering that Austria provided three-fourths of the land forces deployed to defeat France. The main effect of Russia's defection on the Coalition was that Britain could no longer control Austria's actions as it pleased and had to deal with Vienna as an equal partner. Paul I attempted to forge a Russo-Prussian alliance in late 1799 and 1800 to punish Austria and by January 1801 his relations with Britain had also worsened so much that he was on the brink of invading British India with 22,000 Don Cossacks. This plan did not materialise because Tsar (Emperor) Paul I of Russia was assassinated in March 1801.

Although the French military managed to overcome the Austro-Russian expedition, it made little immediate gain from it. By the end of 1799, the Army of Italy held almost the same position as Napoleon Bonaparte had found it in 1796 except that it now also controlled Genoa. The army was in a desolate and impoverished state with famine, lack of ammunition and horses, and bouts of desertion and mutiny as hungry soldiers sought to take food from civilians to survive. The news that Napoleon had returned to France briefly prompted morale amongst the troops to rise as he was still popular for his victories during the 1796–97 Italian campaigns. But when the soldiers heard that Napoleon had committed the Coup of 18 Brumaire and made himself First Consul of the French Republic, French officers generally reported discontent and protests from the troops especially from the Army of Italy which used to be under Napoleon's command. Many regarded the coup as a betrayal of the republican ideals they had been fighting for. Nevertheless, when Napoleon reassumed command he managed to retake control of northern Italy during the Marengo campaign (April–June 1800).

Suvorov was recalled to Saint Petersburg where he died in May 1800. Suvorov remains vividly remembered in the parts of the Swiss Alps that his army passed through. Even though his famished troops plundered the countryside bare and his campaign was ultimately fruitless, the general is venerated as a liberator from the occupying French. Plaques adorn nearly every spot where he ate or slept in the Alps; chairs and beds he used are preserved as exhibits.

== In art ==
Pictures

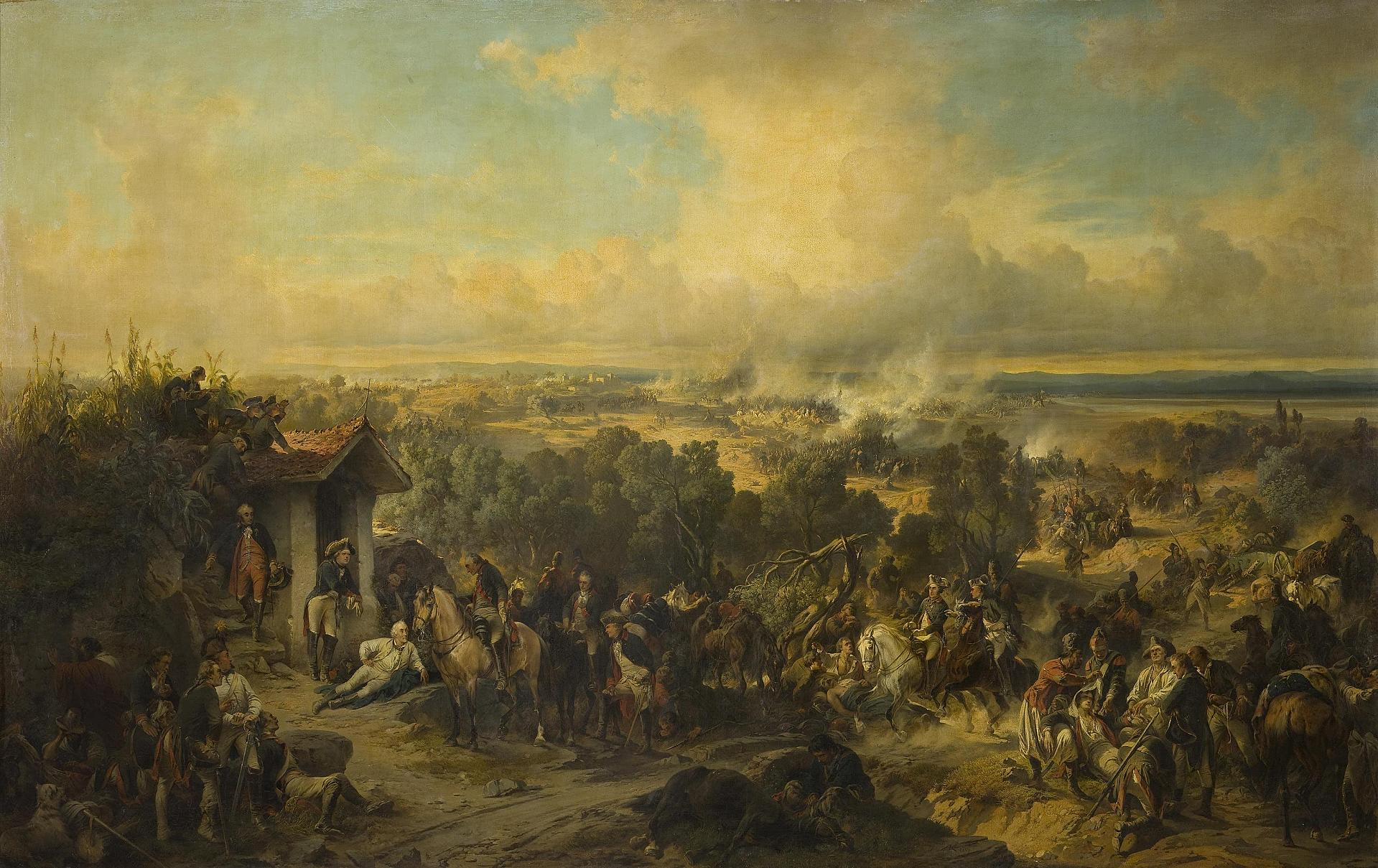
Suvorov victorious at the Battle of Trebbia. Alexander von Kotzebue, 1889.

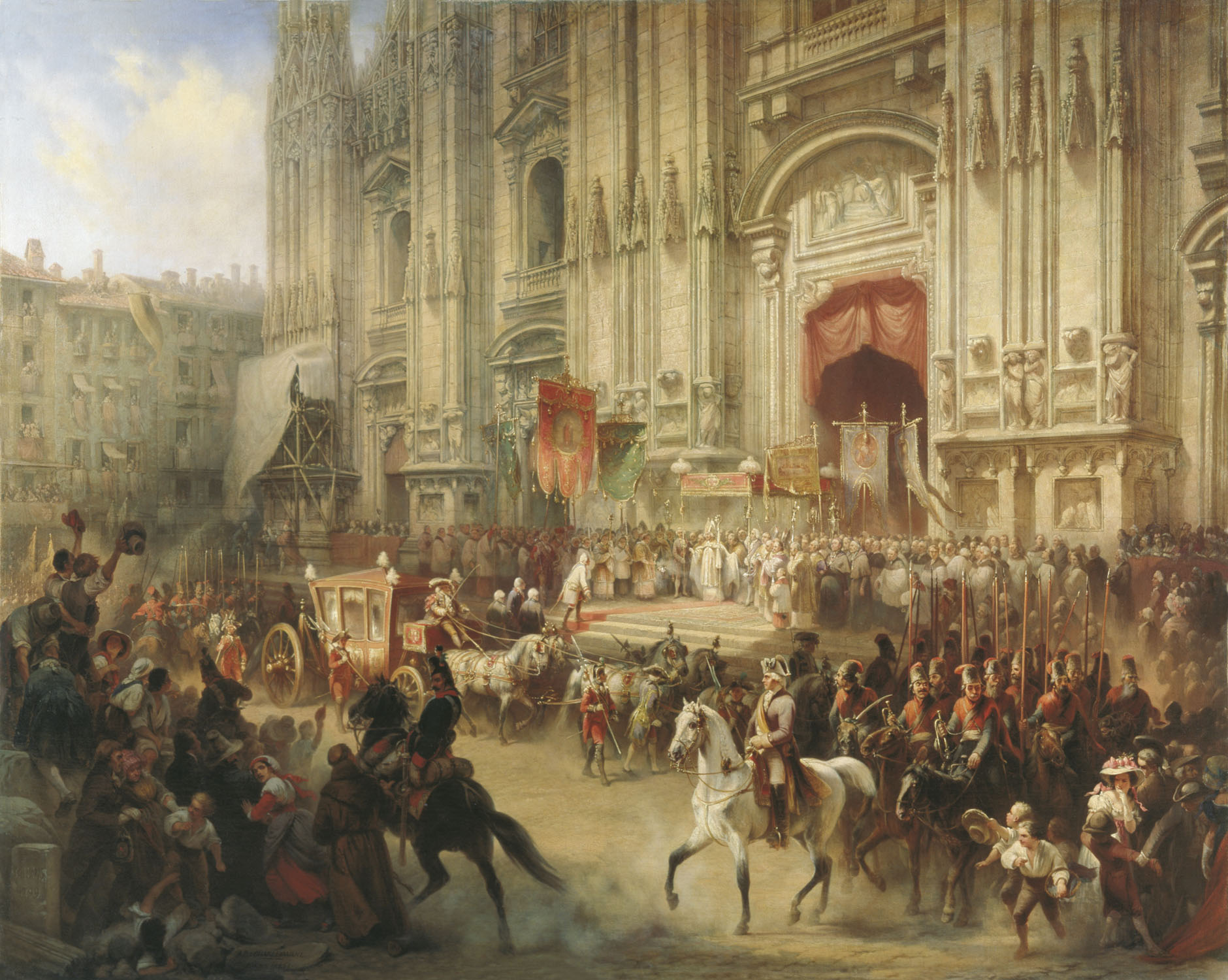
Suvorov in Milan. Adolf Charlemagne (d. 1901).

Suvorov at the St. Gotthard Pass. Adolf Charlemagne, 1855.

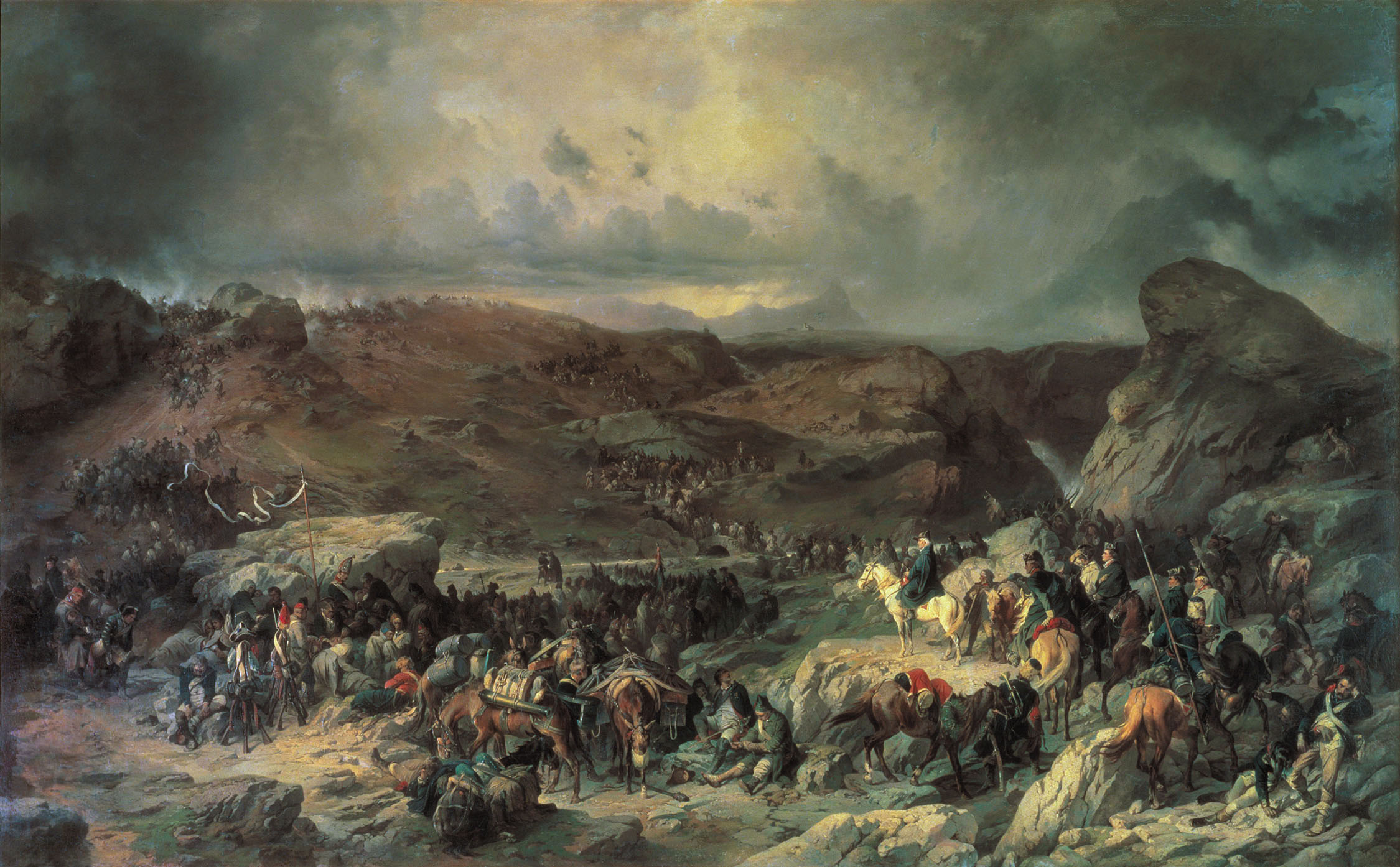
Suvorov Crossing the St. Gotthard Pass, an Alexander Kotzebue painting

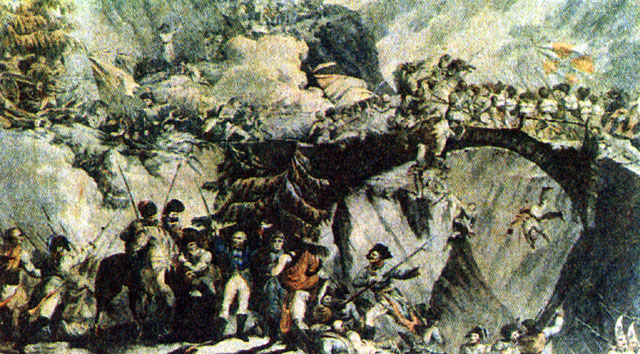
Suvorov Crossing the Devil's Bridge. Robert Porter (d. 1842).

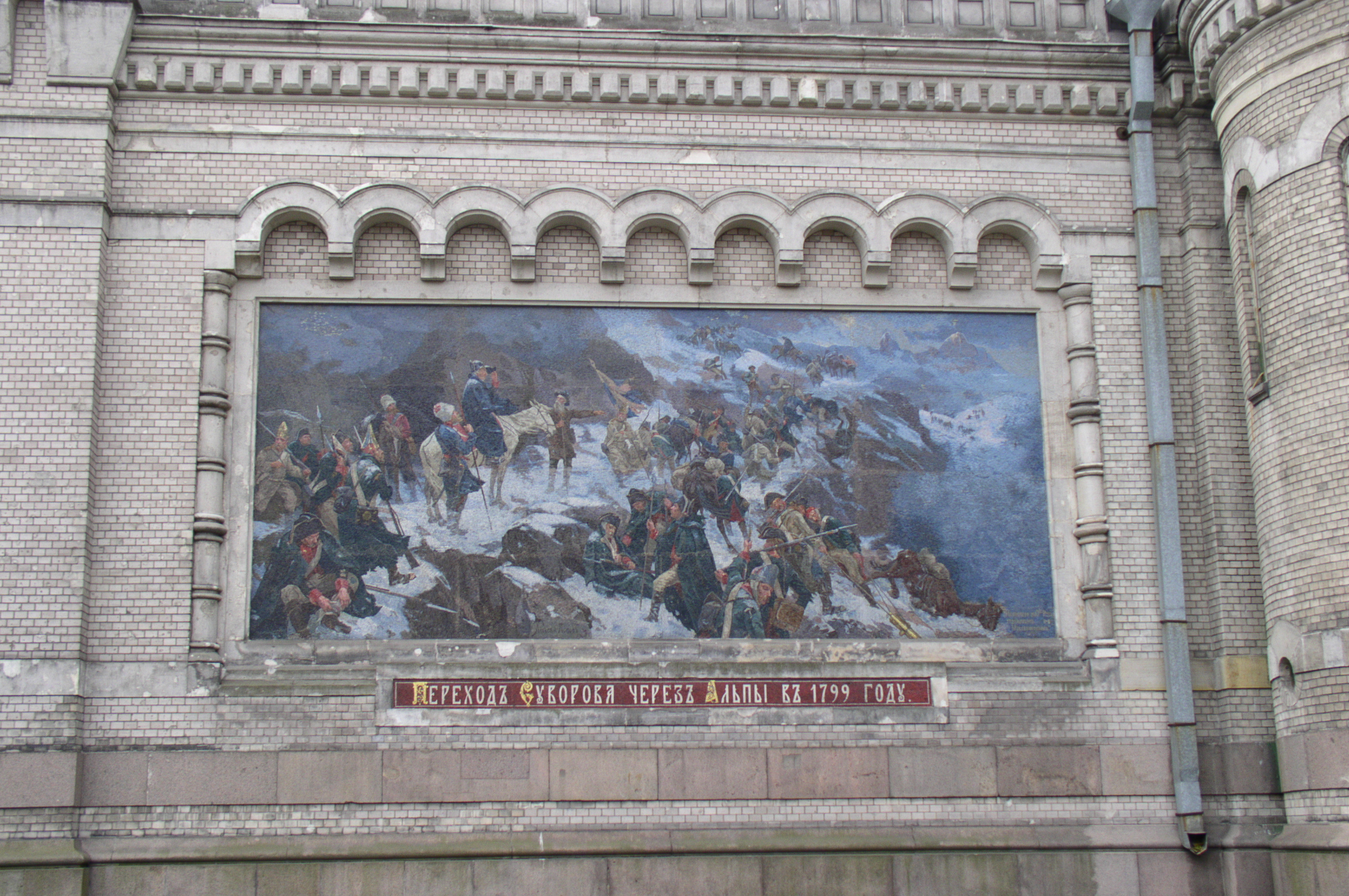
Suvorov's March across the Alps (1904 mosaic from the Suvorov Museum).

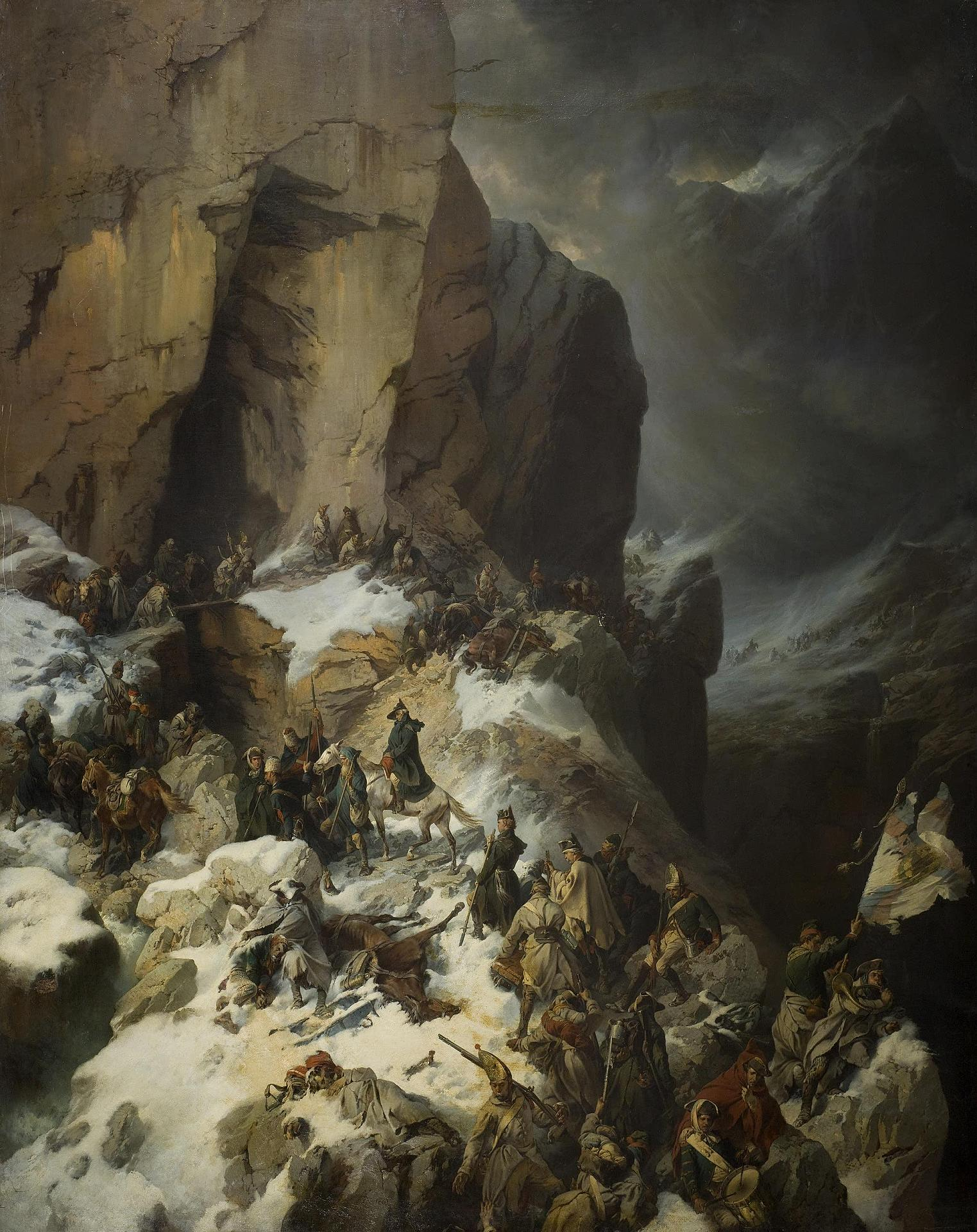
Suvorov Crossing the Panix Pass, an Alexander Kotzebue painting, 1860.

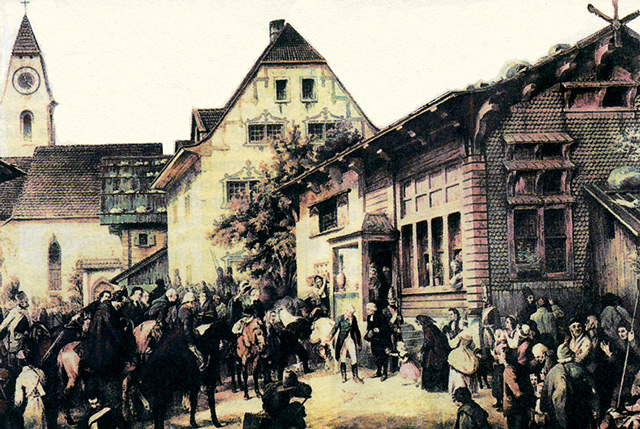
Suvorov Bidding Farewell to the Swiss People. Andrey Popov (d. 1896).
Monuments

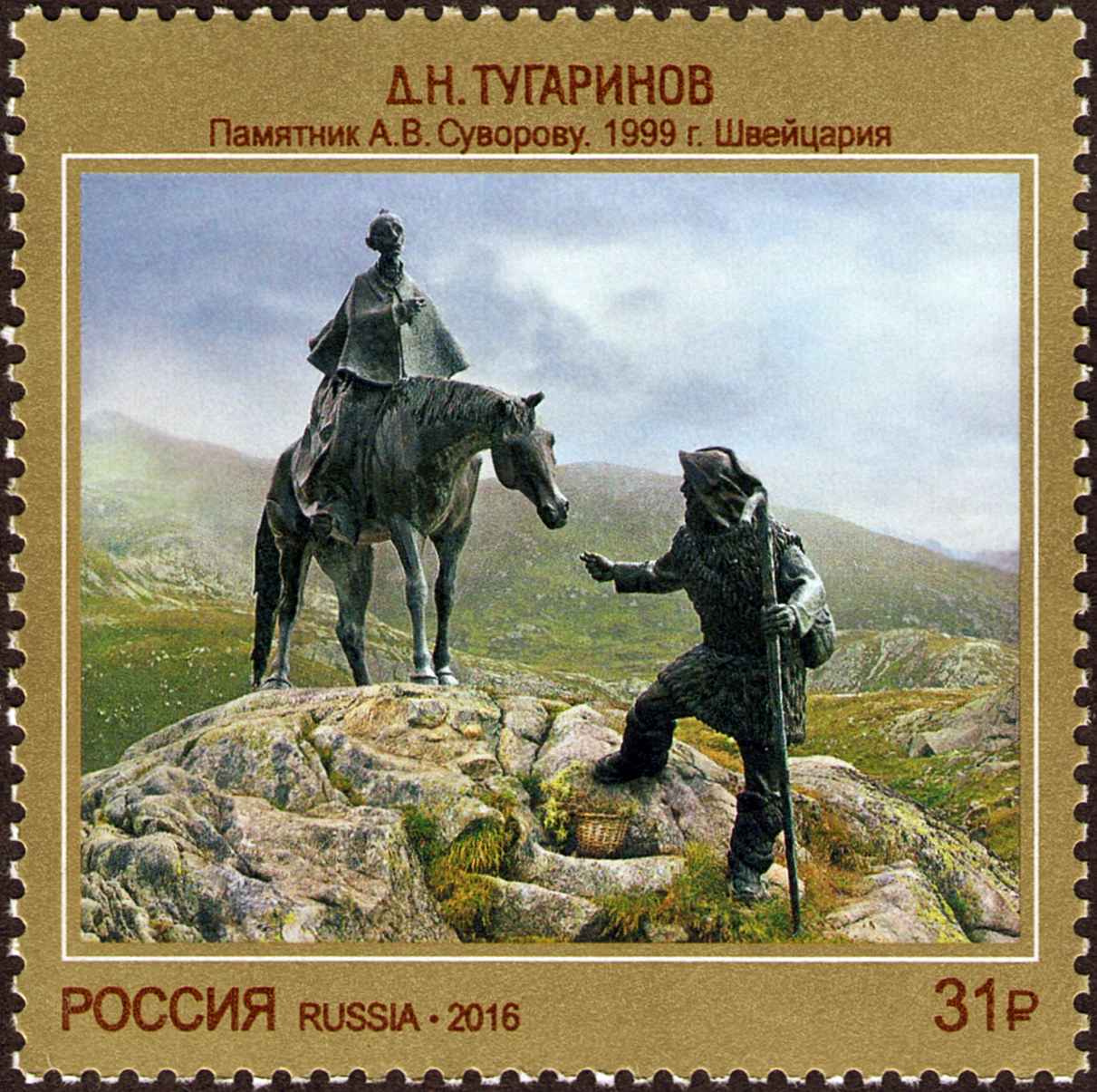
1999 statue on the St. Gotthard Pass on 2016 postage stamp of Russia

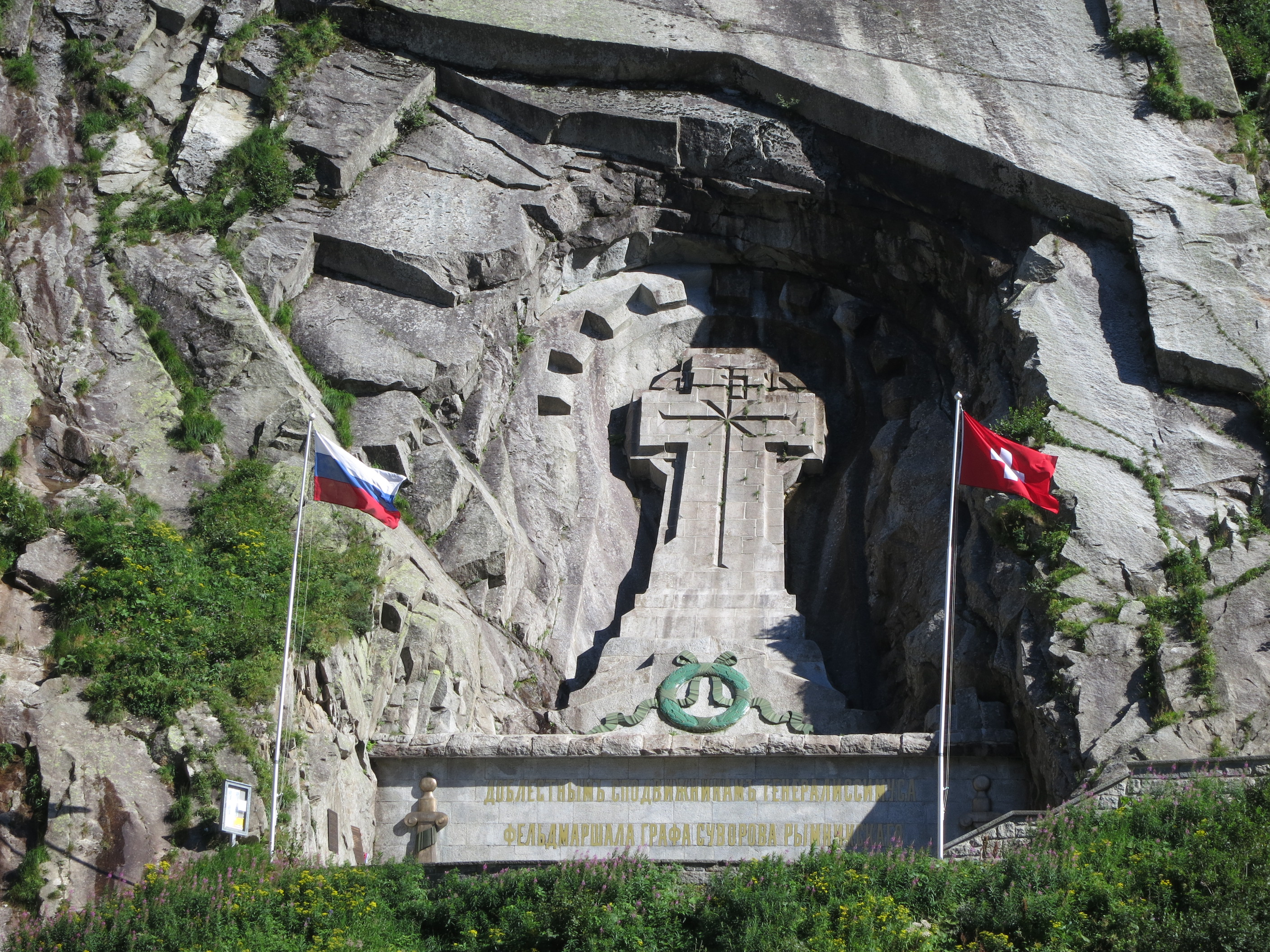
Monument to Alexander Suvorov and his fallen soldiers next to the Devil's Bridge, 1899.
Caricatures

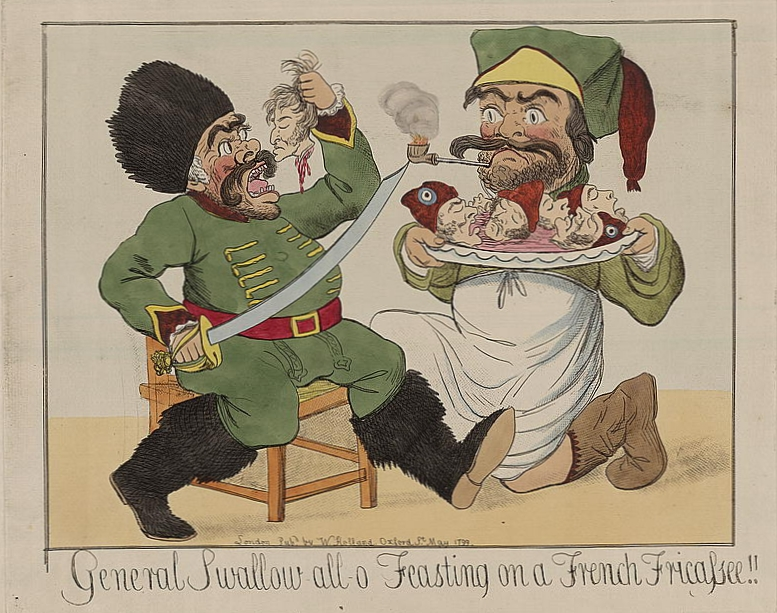
General Swallow-all-o Feasting on a French Fricassee!!

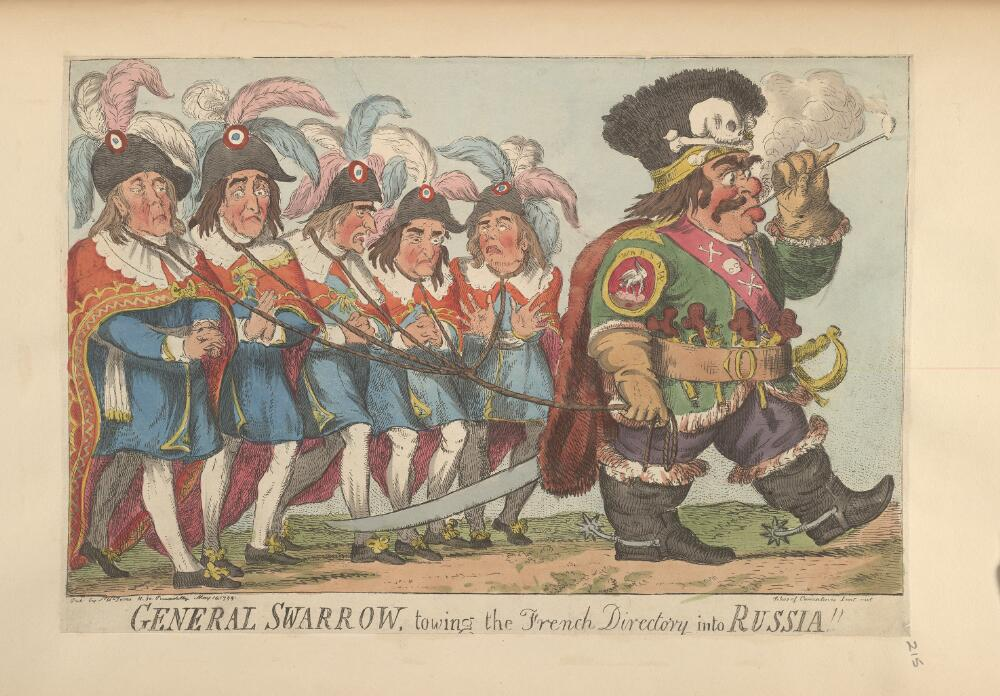
General Swarrow, towing the French Directory into Russia!!—On Suvorov's uniform, on the right sleeve, a patch with the inscription "WARSAW". (reference to the Praga events of 1794)

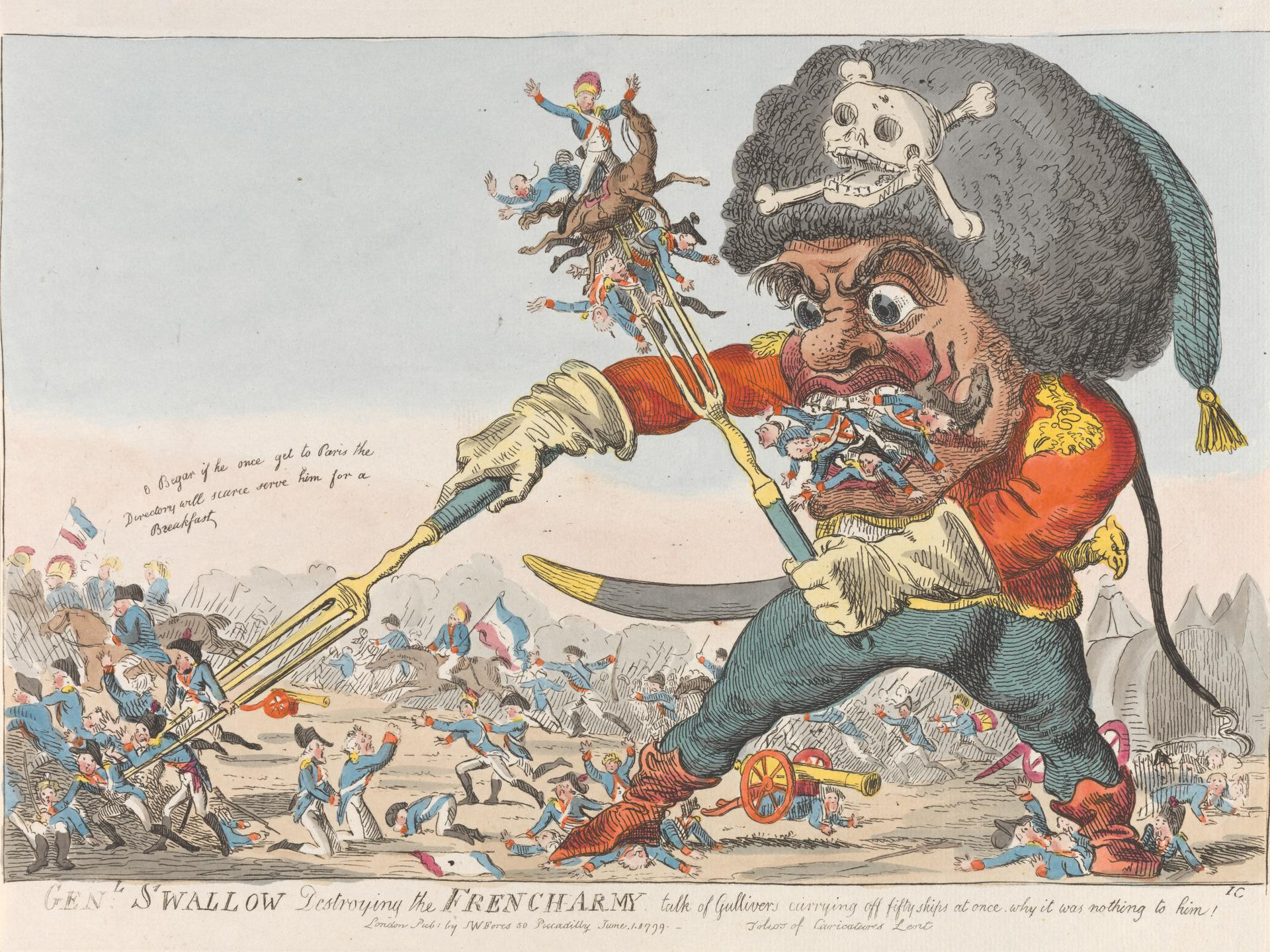
Gen'l Swallow Destroying the French Army. By Isaac Cruikshank.

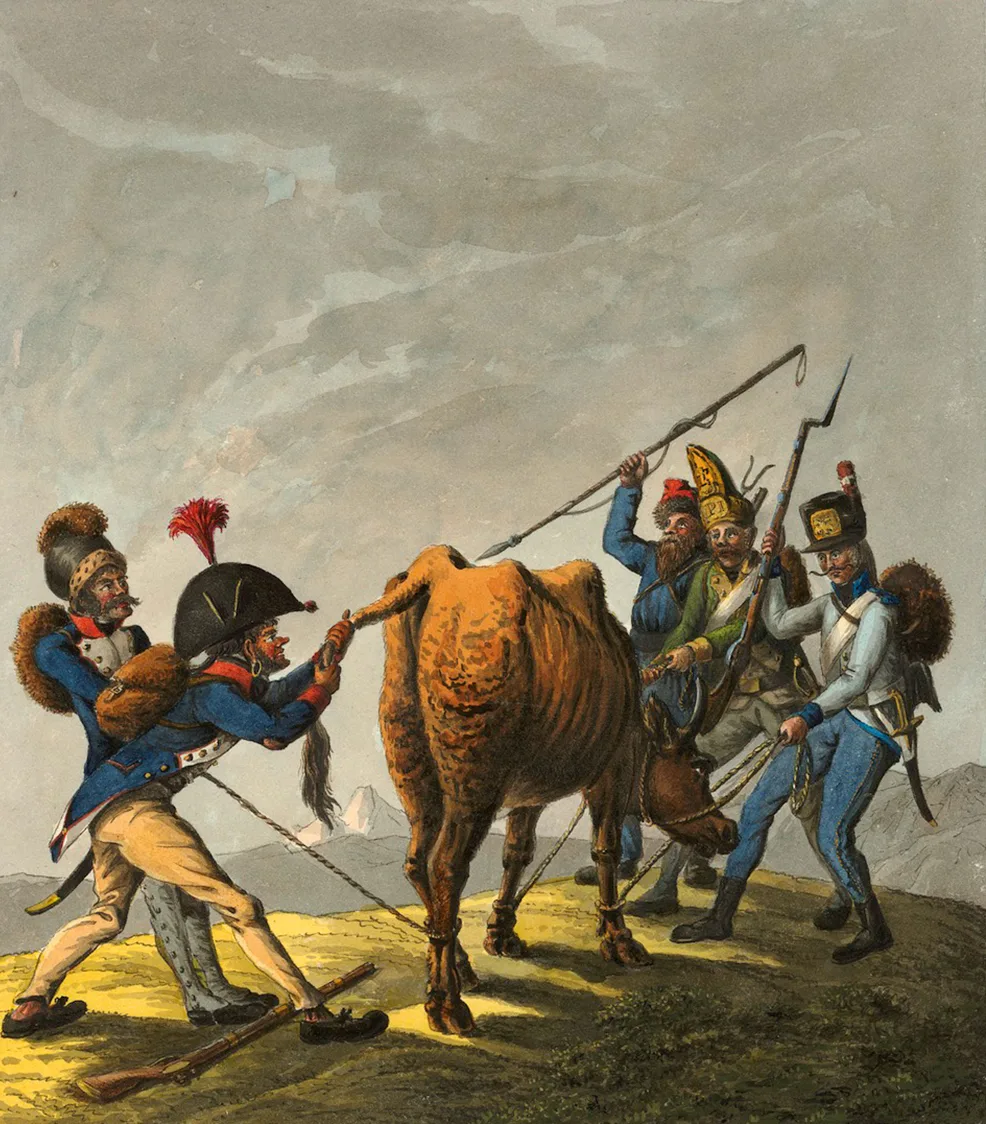
Story of a Swiss Cow (the fighting between Suvorov's soldiers and French during the Swiss campaign, in which a large portion of the mountain population's livestock fell victim). Zurich Central Library, Prints and Drawings Collection

== List of battles ==
| Date | Battle | Region | French forces | Coalition forces | Result |
|---|---|---|---|---|---|
| 6 March 1799 | Battle of Chur | Grisons, Switzerland | French First Republic | Habsburg Monarchy | French victory |
| 7 March 1799 | (First) Battle of Feldkirch | Vorarlberg, Austria | French First Republic | Habsburg Monarchy | French victory |
| 20–21 March 1799 | Battle of Ostrach | Swabia, Germany | French First Republic | Habsburg Monarchy | Coalition victory |
| 23 March 1799 | (Second) Battle of Feldkirch | Vorarlberg, Austria | French First Republic | Habsburg Monarchy | Coalition victory |
| 25 March 1799 | Battle of Stockach | Swabia, Germany | French First Republic | Habsburg Monarchy | Coalition victory |
| 29 March 1799 | Battle of Verona | Veneto, Italy | French First Republic | Habsburg Monarchy | Draw |
| 5 April 1799 | Battle of Magnano | Piedmont, Italy | French First Republic | Habsburg Monarchy | Coalition victory |
| April–July 1799 | Siege of Mantua | Lombardy, Italy | French First Republic | Habsburg Monarchy | Coalition victory |
| 21 April 1799 | Capture of Brescia | Brescia, Northern Italy | French First Republic | Russian Empire; Habsburg Monarchy | Coalition victory |
| 27–28 April 1799 | Battle of Cassano | Lombardy, Italy | French First Republic | Russian Empire; Habsburg Monarchy | Coalition victory |
| 12 May 1799 | Battle of Bassignana | Piedmont, Italy | French First Republic | Russian Empire; Habsburg Monarchy | French victory |
| 16 May 1799 | First Battle of Marengo (Battle of San Giuliano) | Piedmont, Italy | French First Republic | Habsburg Monarchy; Russian Empire | Coalition victory |
| 25 May 1799 | Battle of Frauenfeld | Thurgau, Switzerland | French First Republic; Helvetic Republic | Habsburg Monarchy | Draw |
| 27 May 1799 | Battle of Winterthur | Zürich, Switzerland | French First Republic | Habsburg Monarchy | Coalition victory |
| 4–7 June 1799 | First Battle of Zurich | Zürich, Switzerland | French First Republic | Habsburg Monarchy | Coalition victory |
| 12 June 1799 | Battle of Modena | Romagna, Italy | French First Republic | Habsburg Monarchy | French victory |
| 17–20 June 1799 | Battle of Trebbia | Piedmont, Italy | French First Republic (Poland) Polish Legion | Russian Empire; Habsburg Monarchy | Coalition victory |
| 20 June 1799 | Second Battle of Marengo (Battle of Cascina Grossa) | Piedmont, Italy | French First Republic | Habsburg Monarchy | French victory |
| 14–15 August 1799 | Battle of Schwyz | Schwyz, Switzerland | French First Republic | Habsburg Monarchy | French victory |
| 14–16 August 1799 | Battle of Amsteg | Uri, Switzerland | French First Republic | Habsburg Monarchy | French victory |
| 15 August 1799 | (First) Battle of Novi | Piedmont, Italy | French First Republic | Russian Empire; Habsburg Monarchy | Coalition victory |
| 18 September 1799 | Battle of Mannheim | Palatinate, Germany | French First Republic | Habsburg Monarchy | Coalition victory |
| 24 September 1799 | Battle of Gotthard Pass | Ticino, Switzerland | French First Republic | Russian Empire; Habsburg Monarchy | Coalition victory |
| 25–26 September 1799 | Second Battle of Zurich | Zürich, Switzerland | French First Republic | Russian Empire; Habsburg Monarchy | French key victory |
| 25–26 September 1799 | Battle of Linth River | Glarus, Switzerland | French First Republic | Russian Empire; Habsburg Monarchy (Old Swiss Confederacy) Swiss rebels | French victory |
| 30 September – 1 October 1799 | Battle of Klöntal | Linth, Switzerland | French First Republic | Russian Empire; Habsburg Monarchy | Coalition victory |
| 30 September – 1 October 1799 | Battle of Muottental | Waldstätten, Switzerland | French First Republic | Russian Empire | Coalition key victory |
| 24 October 1799 | Second Battle of Novi (Battle of Bosco) | Piedmont, Italy | French First Republic (Poland) Polish Legion | Habsburg Monarchy | French victory |
| 4 November 1799 | Battle of Genola (Battle of Fossano) | Piedmont, Italy | French First Republic | Habsburg Monarchy | Coalition victory |
| 6 November 1799 | Third Battle of Novi | Piedmont, Italy | French First Republic | Habsburg Monarchy | French victory |
| 3 December 1799 | Battle of Wiesloch | Baden, Germany | French First Republic | Habsburg Monarchy | Coalition victory |

== See also ==
- Suvorov's Swiss campaign

== Sources ==
- Clausewitz, Carl von (1834). Hinterlassene Werke des Generals Carl von Clausewitz über Krieg und Kriegführung, zweiter teil : Die Feldzüge von 1799 in Italien und der Schweiz (in German). Berlin: F.Dümmler. OCLC 19596006.
- Clausewitz, Carl von (2020). Napoleon Absent, Coalition Ascendant: The 1799 Campaign in Italy and Switzerland, Volume 1. Trans and ed. Nicholas Murray and Christopher Pringle. Lawrence, Kansas: University Press of Kansas. ISBN 978-0-7006-3025-7
- Clausewitz, Carl von (2021). The Coalition Crumbles, Napoleon Returns: The 1799 Campaign in Italy and Switzerland, Volume 2. Trans and ed. Nicholas Murray and Christopher Pringle. Lawrence, Kansas: University Press of Kansas. ISBN 978-0-7006-3034-9
- Dmitry Milyutin. The History of the War of Russia with France during the Reign of Emperor Paul I, vol. 1–9. St. Petersburg, 1852–1853.
- Schroeder, Paul W. (1987). "The Collapse of the Second Coalition". Journal of Modern History. 59 (2). The University of Chicago Press: 244–290. doi:10.1086/243185. JSTOR 1879727. S2CID 144734206.
- Latimer, Jon (December 1999). "War of the Second Coalition". Military History: 62–69.
- Longworth, Philip (1965). The Art of Victory: The Life and Achievements of Generalissimo Suvorov (1729–1800). New York: Holt, Rhinehart & Winston. OCLC 7139853.
- Suvorov, Alexander Vasilyevich (2023) [1806]. Наука побеждать [The Science of Victory]. Эксклюзивная классика (revised ed.). Moscow: AST. ISBN 978-5-17-157345-4.
- Orlov, Nikolay (1892). Разбор военных действий Суворова в Италии в 1799 году [Analysis of Suvorov's military actions in Italy in 1799] (in Russian). St. Petersburg: Типография Тренке и Фюсно. ISBN 9785998994289.
