= Franjo Jelačić =

Croatian nobleman

Baron Franjo Jelačić Bužimski
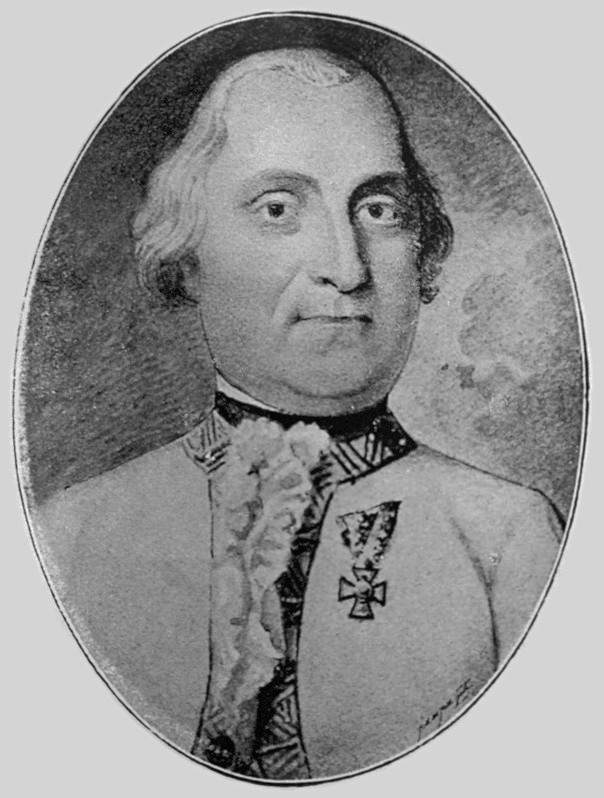
- Born: 14 April 1746; Petrinja, Kingdom of Croatia, Habsburg monarchy (modern Croatia)
- Died: 4 February 1810 (aged 63); Zalaapáti, Kingdom of Hungary, Austrian Empire (modern Hungary)
- Relatives: Josip Jelačić, son Ana Portner von Höflein, wife
- Military career
- Allegiance: Habsburg Monarchy; Austrian Empire
- Branch: Army
- Service years: 1763–1810
- Rank: Feldmarschall-Leutnant
- Conflicts: Austro-Turkish War (1788–1791); Relief of Cetingrad; French Revolutionary Wars; Battle of Würzburg; Battle of Feldkirch; Battle of Schwyz; Napoleonic Wars; Ulm Campaign; Capitulation of Dornbirn; Battle of Sankt Michael; Battle of Raab; Battle of Wagram
- Awards: Military Order of Maria Theresa (1799)
- Other work: Inhaber Infantry Regiment Nr. 62

Baron Franjo Jelačić Bužimski (English: Franz Jellacic / Francis Yellachich of Buzhim; German: Franz Jellačić von Buzim; Hungarian: Ferenc Jellacsics de Buzim; 14 April 1746 – 4 February 1810) was a Croatian military officer and nobleman, a member of the House of Jelačić. He began his service in the Habsburg army as a Grenz infantry officer and fought against the Ottoman Empire. During the French Revolutionary Wars he received promotion to the rank of general officer and won an outstanding victory at Feldkirch. His later career proved that his martial abilities were limited. He twice led independent division-sized forces in the Napoleonic Wars, with unhappy results. He was Proprietor (Inhaber) of an Austrian infantry regiment from 1802 until his death.

== Early career ==
Born in 1746 at Petrinja in the Kingdom of Croatia of the Habsburg Monarchy, Jelačić became an officer cadet in the 1st Banat Grenz Infantry Regiment in 1763. He was appointed to Captain in 1772 and Major in 1783. He participated in the Austro-Turkish War (1787–91) and earned promotion to Oberstleutnant (lieutenant colonel). Still serving with the Grenz infantry of the Habsburg monarchy army, Jelačić was elevated to the rank of Oberst (Colonel) in 1794. He fought in the War of the First Coalition on the upper Rhine River, at the Battle of Würzburg, and in other actions. His promotion to General-Major came through in March 1797.

On 23 March 1799 at the Battle of Feldkirch in the Vorarlberg, Jelačić led his 5,500 soldiers to victory over 12,000 Frenchmen. The Austrians inflicted 3,000 casualties on their enemies at a cost of 900 killed and wounded. His command included the 3rd battalions of the Kaunitz Infantry Regiment Nr. 20, De Vins Infantry Regiment Nr. 37, and Peterwardeiner Grenz Regiment Nr. 9; the 2nd battalion of the St. George Gernz Infantry Nr. 6, and the 1st battalion of the Broder Grenz Infantry Regiment Nr. 7. The French were led by two future Marshals, André Masséna and Nicolas Oudinot. For this remarkable feat, he received promotion to Feldmarschall-Leutnant (Lieutenant Field Marshal) and was awarded the Knight's Cross of the Military Order of Maria Theresa. He was also given the title of hereditary baron. In 1802 Emperor Francis II appointed him proprietor of Franz Jellačić Infantry Regiment Nr. 62, a new Hungarian outfit. This unit should not be confused with the Johann Jellačić Infantry Regiment Nr. 53. In 1801, his wife Ana Portner von Höflein gave birth to their son Josip Jelačić, who also became a general and supported the Austrian regime during the Hungarian Revolution of 1848.

== Napoleonic Wars ==
In 1805, Jelačić commanded a corps in the army of Archduke Ferdinand Karl Joseph of Austria-Este and Karl Mack von Leiberich during the Ulm Campaign. At first his troops defended Biberach an der Riss. Around 6 October, Mack ordered Jelačić to move toward Ulm. At this time, Jelačić commanded 15,000 troops organized in 16 infantry battalions, six Jäger companies, and six cavalry squadrons. Emperor Napoleon I of France and his Grande Armée began to envelop the Austrian army. During the Battle of Wertingen on 8 October, the Battle of Günzburg on 9 October, and the Battle of Haslach-Jungingen on 11 October, the Grande Armée began to close in on its prey. On the 12th, Mack reorganized his army, making Jelačić one of four corps commanders, the others being Johann Sigismund Riesch, Franz von Werneck, and Karl Philipp, Prince of Schwarzenberg. He then ordered Jelačić to march south toward the Tyrol via Ochsenhausen for no explainable reason.

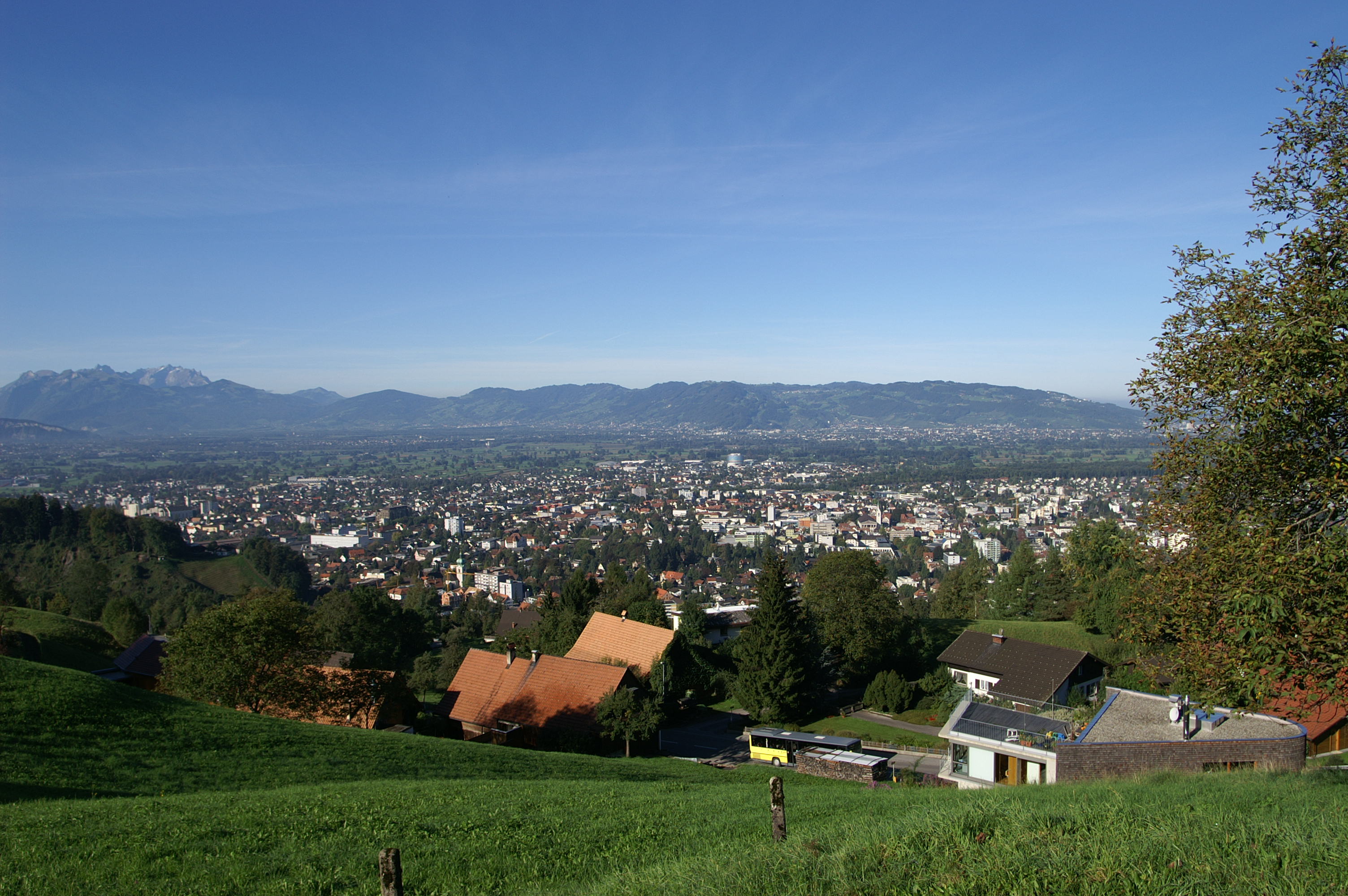
Jelačić surrendered at Dornbirn on 13 November 1805

Jelačić's troops escaped the Surrender of Ulm and made it to the Vorarlberg near Lake Constance. Napoleon assigned Marshal Pierre Augereau and his 12,000-man corps to hunt down Jelačić. In a series of small actions, Augereau drove the Austrians steadily back and managed to split their forces apart. Jelačić surrendered to Augereau with his remaining 4,000 troops in the Capitulation of Dornbirn on 13 November. Under the terms of surrender, the Austrians were repatriated to Bohemia with the promise not to fight against France for one year. One thousand of his cavalry, under General-Major Christian Wolfskeel von Reichenberg and Colonels Wartensleben and Kinsky, made a remarkable march through Bavaria and reached Bohemia in safety. Another portion of the Vorarlberg force under Prince Viktor Rohan tried to reach Venice but was caught 40 kilometres (25 mi) short of its goal. Rohan surrendered to Laurent Gouvion Saint-Cyr and Jean Reynier at Castelfranco Veneto. Jelačić soon retired from military service.

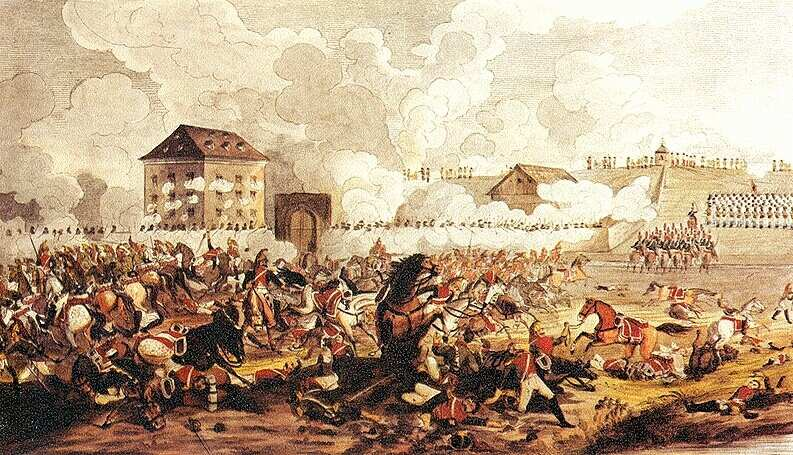
Battle of Raab

Brought out of retirement for the War of the Fifth Coalition, Jelačić took command of an infantry division in Johann von Hiller's VI Armeekorps. Originally, the division included two line infantry brigades under Konstantin von Ettingshausen and Josef Hoffmeister von Hoffeneck. On the outbreak of war, Hoffmeister's brigade was exchanged for the light brigade of Karl Dollmayer von Provenchères. The division was detached from VI Armeekorps and sent to occupy Munich. After the Austrian defeats at the battles of Abensberg, Landshut, and Eckmühl from 20 to 22 April 1809, Hiller retreated rapidly east and Jelačić was ordered back to Salzburg.

Jelačić's 10,000-man division was assigned to the army of Archduke John of Austria. On 29 April the Bavarians occupied Salzburg as Jelačić slipped away to the south. He successfully defended the Lueg Pass near Golling an der Salzach on 1 and 4–5 May, twice defeating a Bavarian brigade. He sent Provenchères and almost all of his cavalry to join the main army. John desired Jelačić to join him, but his orders were ambiguously worded. Misinterpreting his orders as requiring him to hold his isolated position, he stayed in place until 19 May. When Jelačić finally realized his danger and withdrew toward Graz, it was too late. Believing his artillery to be of little use in the mountains, he sent most of it ahead of his column, retaining only four cannons. On 25 May, Paul Grenier's 12,000 to 15,000 strong Franco-Italian corps caught up with his division at the Battle of Sankt Michael near Leoben on 25 May. Without sufficient artillery and cavalry support, Jelačić's 9,000 troops were overwhelmed, suffering 423 dead, 1,137 wounded, and 4,963 captured. French losses numbered only 670. Historian Gunther E. Rothenberg called Jelačić "a remarkably unlucky and inept general."

Jelačić and his survivors joined Archduke John's retreat across Hungary. At the Battle of Raab, he commanded 7,500 infantry of the right flank division. With help from the army reserve, his soldiers drove off the first Franco-Italian attack, but the action ended in an Austrian defeat. He commanded his division at the Battle of Wagram but John's army arrived too late on the field to have any effect on the outcome. He died on 4 February 1810 at Zalaapáti in modern-day Hungary.

== See also ==
- House of Jelačić
- Josip Jelačić
- Bužim
- List of Military Order of Maria Theresa recipients of Croatian descent

== Notes ==
Military offices
Preceded by vacant	Proprietor (Inhaber) of Infantry Regiment # 62; 1802–1810	Succeeded by Theodore, Freiherr von Wacquant-Geozelles
