= Péter Mihalecz =

Hungarian footballer

Personal information
- Full name: Péter Mihalecz
- Date of birth: 6 June 1979 (age 47)
- Place of birth: Zalaegerszeg, Hungary
- Height: 1.83 m (6 ft 0 in)
- Position: Forward

Team information
- Current team: Ajka
- Number: 6

Youth career
- 1993–1997: Zalaegerszeg

Senior career*
Years	Team	Apps	(Gls)
1997–1998	Zalaapáti	11	(3)
1998–1999	Hévíz	11	(1)
1999–2000	Bük	25	(9)
2000–2002	Haladás		
2002–2003	Bük	30	(9)
2003–2004	Pécs	9	(1)
2004–2008	Haladás	93	(22)
2008–	Ajka	155	(69)
- * Club domestic league appearances and goals as of 1 June 2014

Péter Mihalecz (born 6 June 1979 in Zalaegerszeg) is a Hungarian professional footballer who plays for FC Ajka.

== Career statistics ==
Appearances and goals by club, season and competition
Club	Season	League		Cup		League Cup		Europe		Total	
Club	Season	Apps	Goals	Apps	Goals	Apps	Goals	Apps	Goals	Apps	Goals
Zalaapáti
Zalaapáti	1998–99	11	3	3	2	0	0	0	0	14	6
Zalaapáti	Total	11	3	3	2	0	0	0	0	14	6
Hévíz
Hévíz	1998–99	11	1	0	0	0	0	0	0	11	1
Hévíz	Total	11	1	0	0	0	0	0	0	11	1
Bük
Bük	1999–00	25	9	0	0	0	0	0	0	25	9
Bük	2002–03	30	9	0	0	0	0	0	0	30	9
Bük	Total	55	18	0	0	0	0	0	0	55	18
Pécs
Pécs	2003–04	9	1	3	1	0	0	0	0	12	2
Pécs	Total	9	1	3	1	0	0	0	0	12	2
Haladás
Haladás	2004–05	26	11	2	0	0	0	0	0	28	11
Haladás	2005–06	18	7	0	0	0	0	0	0	18	7
Haladás	2006–07	24	2	0	0	0	0	0	0	24	2
Haladás	2007–08	25	2	0	0	0	0	0	0	25	2
Haladás	Total	93	22	2	0	0	0	0	0	95	22
Ajka
Ajka	2008–09	29	12	1	0	0	0	0	0	30	12
Ajka	2009–10	29	19	2	2	0	0	0	0	31	21
Ajka	2010–11	30	19	0	0	0	0	0	0	30	19
Ajka	2011–12	26	10	0	0	0	0	0	0	26	10
Ajka	2012–13	21	6	3	3	0	0	0	0	24	9
Ajka	2013–14	20	3	1	2	1	0	0	0	22	5
Ajka	Total	155	69	7	7	1	0	0	0	163	76
Career total		334	114	13	10	1	0	0	0	350	124

Updated to games played as of 1 June 2014.
