= Panix Pass =

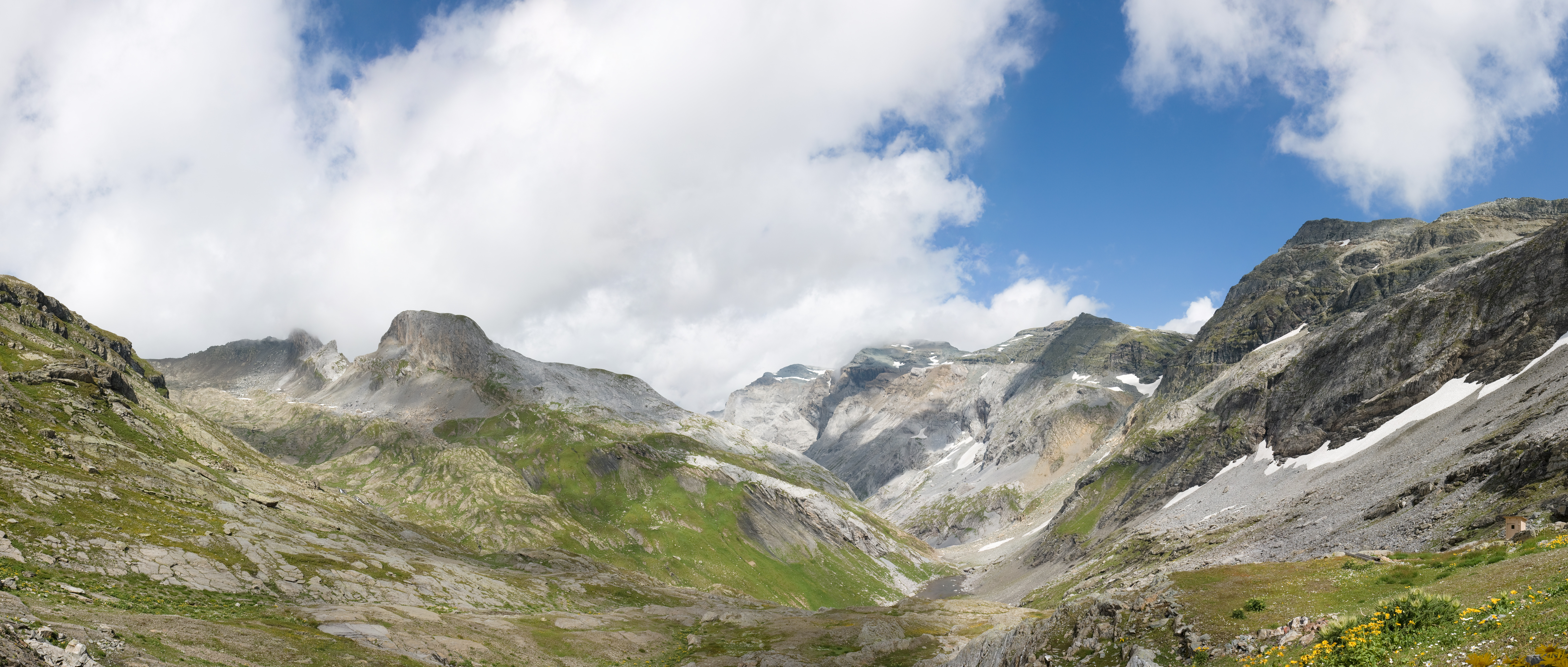
- View from the pass towards Glarus

- Location within Switzerland
- Elevation: 2,404 metres (7,887 ft)
- Traversed by: Trail

Third Approach
- Location: Glarus/Graubünden, Switzerland
- Range: Alps
- Coordinates: 46°51′21″N 09°06′14″E

Panix Pass or Panixer Pass (Romansh: Pass dil Veptga, German: Panixerpass) (2404 m) is a Swiss Alpine pass between the cantons of Glarus and Graubünden.

The pass was once an important trade route between the canton of Glarus and Italy. It connects Elm in the Sernftal in Glarus with Pigniu (Panix) in the Vorderrhein valley of Graubünden. It is not passable by car.

In October 1799, Russian General Alexander Suvorov made a strategic retreat from the French Revolutionary forces south over the pass and regrouped his forces in Austria.

== Gallery ==
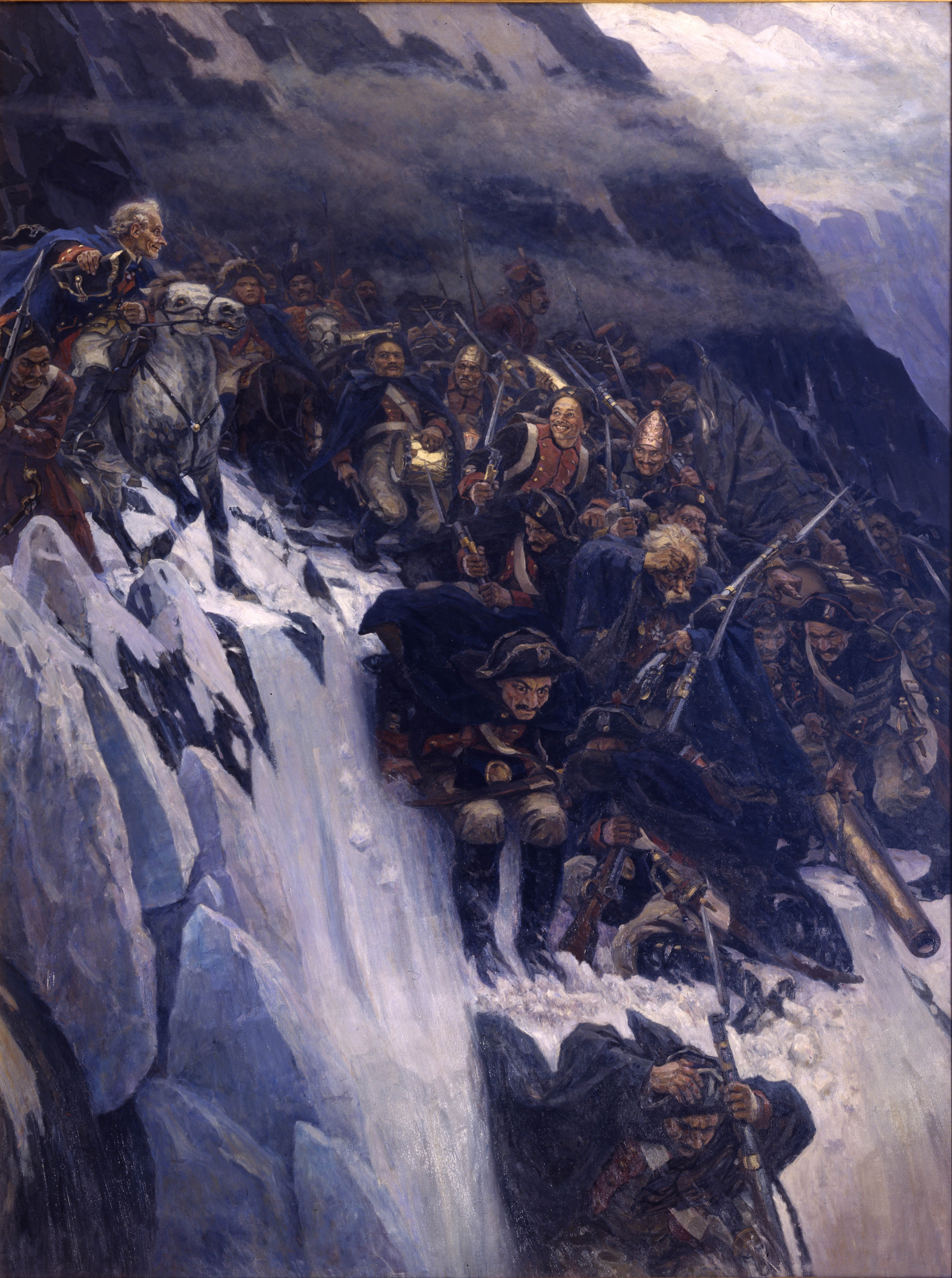
Suvorov crossing the Alps, by Vasily Surikov

The pass in 1919

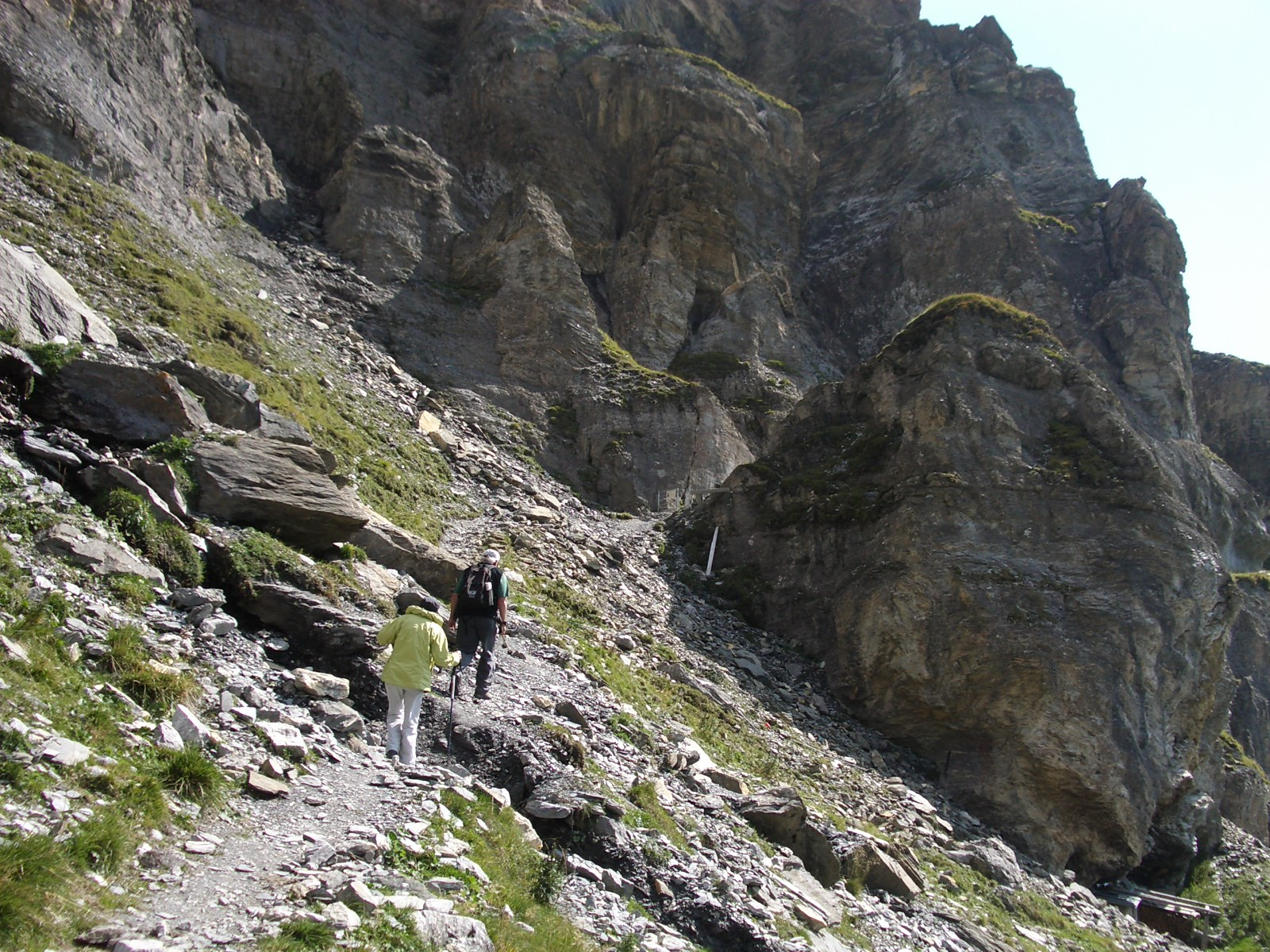
The pass in 2009

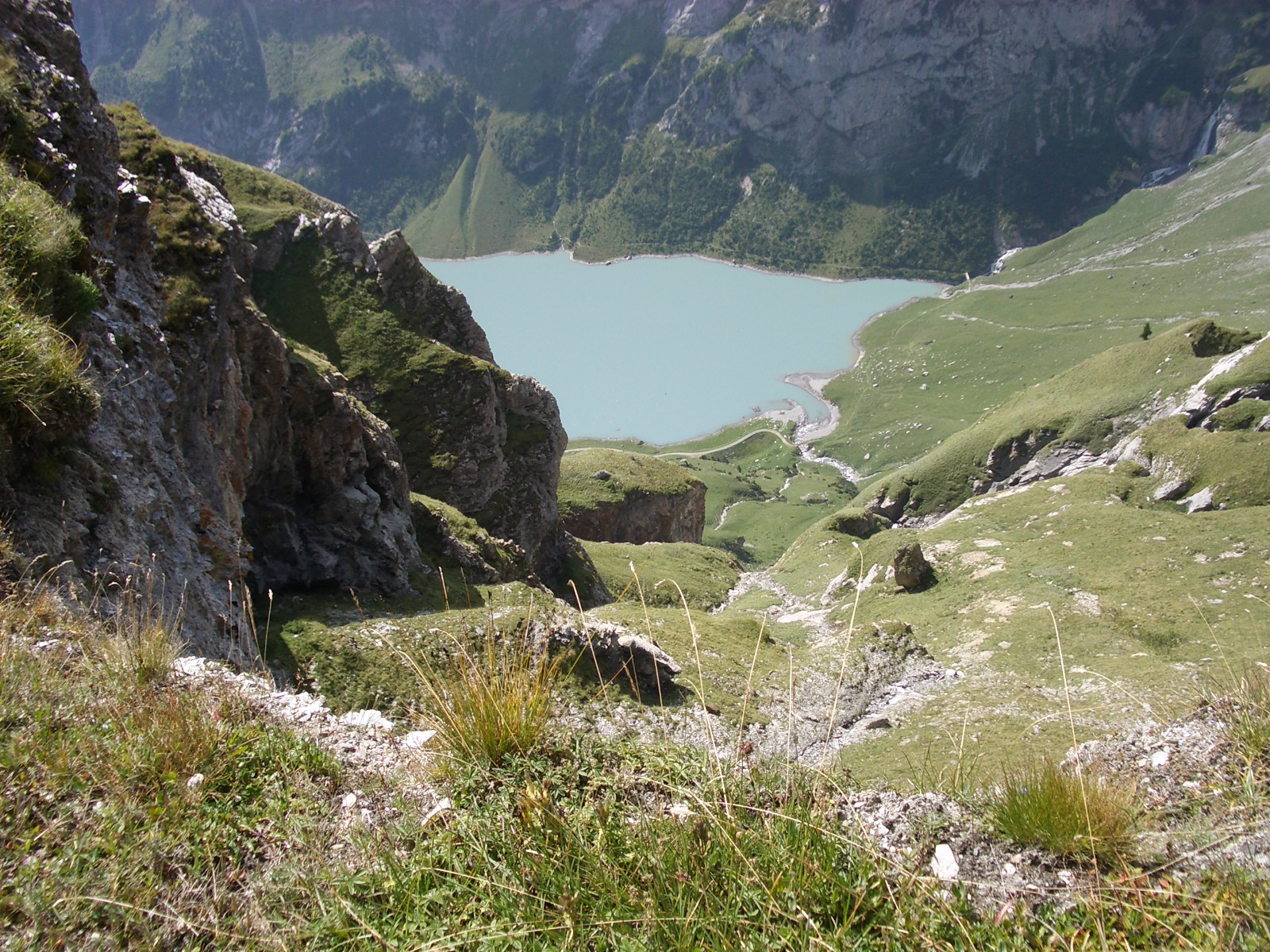
The pass in 2009

== See also ==
- List of mountain passes
