= Jelačić family =

Croatian noble family

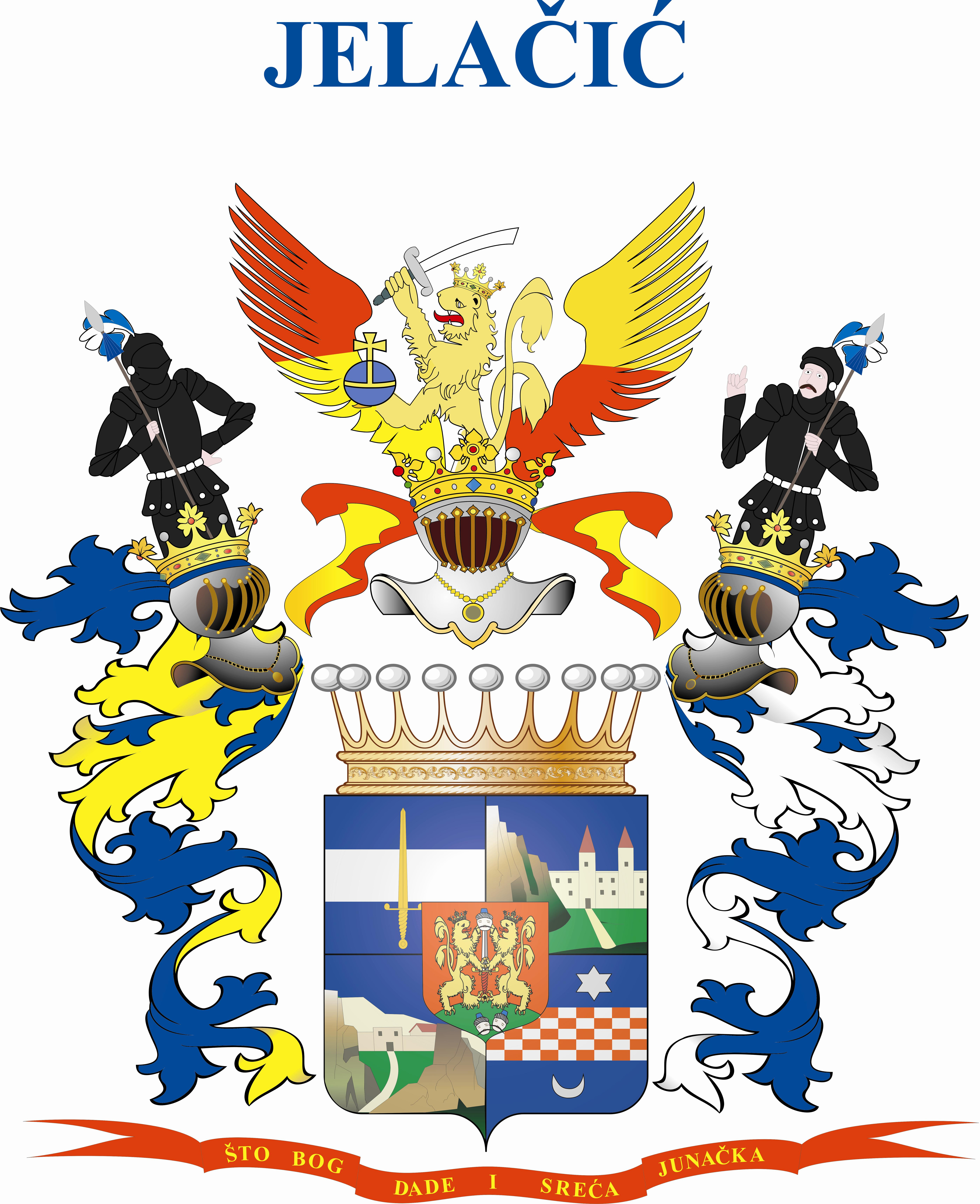
- Coat of arms from the mid 19th century
- Country: Croatia (under the Habsburgs)
- Founded: 1388
- Titles: Baron; Count; Ban
- Estate: of Croatia

The Jelačić family (English and German: Jellacic or Jellachich) is an old Croatian noble family, remarkable during the period in history marked by the Ottoman wars in Europe in the Kingdom of Croatia and Hungary and in the later Austro-Hungarian Empire. Notable members of this family were senior military officers, bans (viceroys) of Croatia or other state officials.

== History ==
The first mention of the Jelačić family name appeared in the 14th century in what is today central Bosnia and Herzegovina. In the 16th century members of family lived in the central Croatian historical region of Banovina, between the rivers of Una and Kupa. In 1550 historical sources mention Mihajlo Jelačić, who lived in Topusko, and in 1551 Marko Jelačić, whose children Ivan, Juraj, Nikola, Petar, Gabrijel and Ana. It gained nobility status with coat of arms in 1579 for their merits in battles against the Ottomans.

Due to Ottoman expansion, the Jelačićs retreated from the Una river area and settled in Turopolje, Hrvatsko Zagorje and Lika. They produced military commanders that fought in many battles against the Ottomans. Janko Jelačić was a comrade of Hungarian-Croatian general Nikola Šubić Zrinski and fell in 1566 in the famous Battle of Szigetvár.

During the 17th and 18th century the family spread and divided into more branches. The family produced many military commanders, among which the best known were Baron Franjo Jelačić (1746–1810), a Field Marshal in Habsburg monarchy army service, and his son Josip (1801–1859), a Ban of Croatia. The former was known for his participation in the Napoleonic wars, while the latter took part in the military campaigns during the Hungarian Revolution of 1848. For his merits, Josip Jelačić was awarded with the title Count.

== See also ==
- Franjo Jelačić
- Josip Jelačić
- Bans (viceroys) of Croatia
- Bužim
