= Battle of Feldkirch =

1799 battle of the War of the Second Coalition

Battles of Feldkirch
- Part of War of the Second Coalition
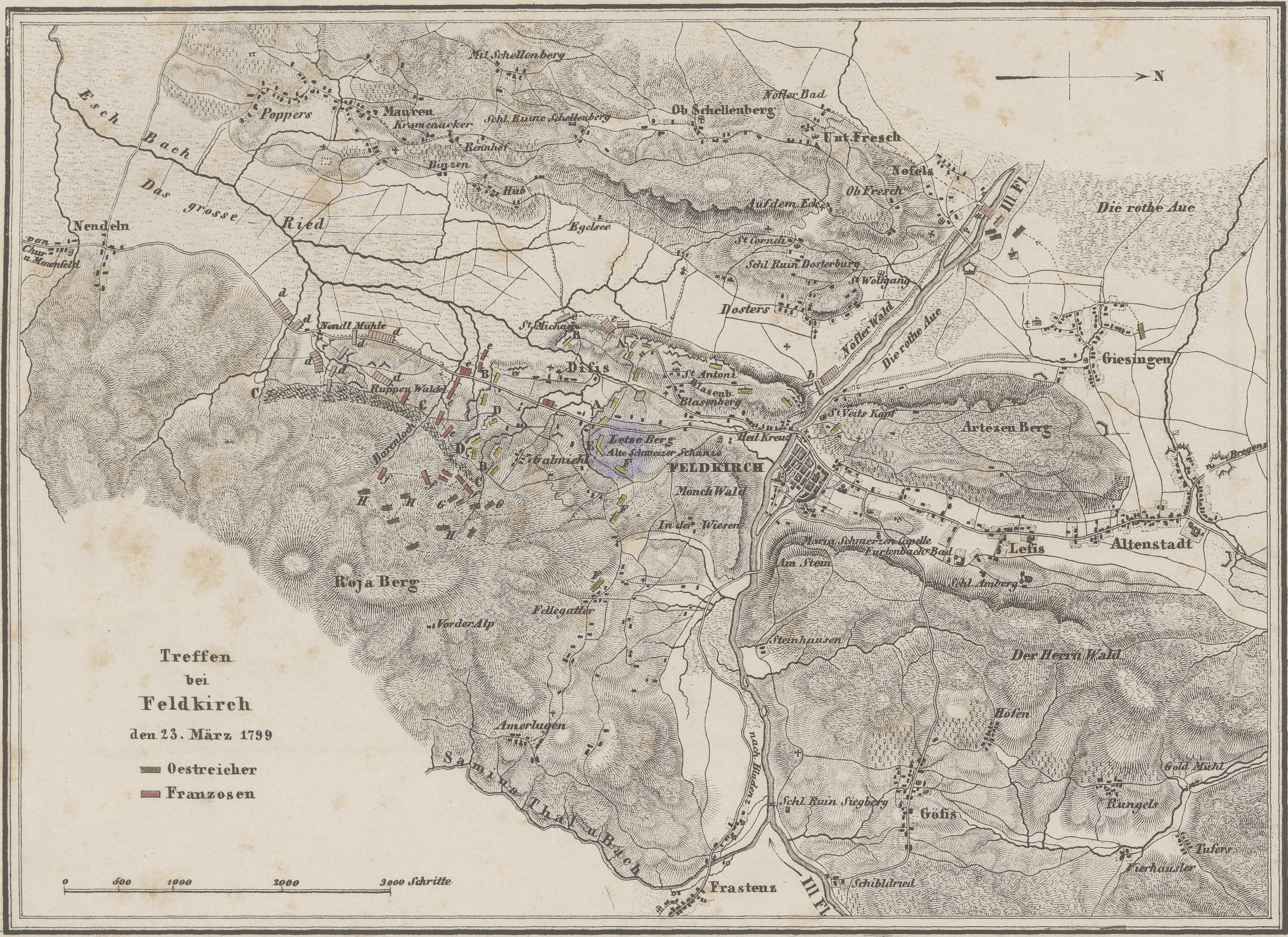
- Contemporary map of the second battle of Feldkirch
Date	7 March 1799 (1st); 23 March 1799 (2nd)
Location	Feldkirch, Vorarlberg, Austria 47°14′17″N 9°35′54″E
Result	French victory (1st); Austrian victory (2nd)

Belligerents
(Habsburg monarchy) Austria	France

Commanders and leaders
1st Feldkirch: (Habsburg monarchy) Friedrich von Hotze; 2nd Feldkirch: (Habsburg monarchy) Franz Jelačić	1st Feldkirch: (France) Nicolas Oudinot (France) André Masséna; 2nd Feldkirch: (France) André Masséna

Strength
1st Feldkirch: 6,000; 2nd Feldkirch: 5,500 regular infantry, 2 squadrons, unknown number of militia or: 4,500 regular army, 3,000 militia	1st Feldkirch: 9,000; 2nd Feldkirch: 12,000–13,000 regular infantry

Casualties and losses
1st Feldkirch: 1,100; 2nd Feldkirch: 900	1st Feldkirch: 200; 2nd Feldkirch: 1,500–3,000

War of the Second Coalition:
Austria
The color black indicates the current battle.

The Battle of Feldkirch (23 March 1799) saw some French corps led by André Masséna attack a weaker Austrian force under Franz Jellacic. Defending fortified positions, the Austrians repulsed all of the French columns, though the struggle lasted until nightfall. This and other French setbacks in southern Germany soon caused Masséna to go on the defensive. The War of the Second Coalition combat occurred at the Austrian town of Feldkirch, Vorarlberg, located 158 kilometres (98 mi) west of Innsbruck.

On a flimsy pretext, a French army invaded Switzerland in January 1798 and forced the country into an uneasy alliance marked by occasional revolts. By the start of hostilities with Austria in early 1799, Masséna was in command of the Army of Helvetia. Going on the offensive, the French, having a numerical advantage, inflicted defeats on the Austrians at Maienfeld, Chur and Feldkirch on 6 and 7 March. Ordered to attack Feldkirch in late March by his superior Jean-Baptiste Jourdan, Masséna attacked with troops under Nicolas Oudinot. Jourdan's defeats at Ostrach and Stockach soon forced the French to recoil.

== Background ==
=== French occupation of Switzerland ===
The ostensible reason for the French Directory to order the invasion of Switzerland was that the Confederation was maltreating the people of the Canton of Vaud. However, the real reason was most likely the desire for the French government to get its hands on the Swiss treasury at Bern. Named to command the Army of Helvetia, Guillaume Brune with a division from the Army of Italy started marching north on 1 January 1798. Meanwhile, Balthazar Alexis Henri Schauenburg's 15,000-man division was detached from the Army of the Rhine and began advancing on Bern from the north. During this time bogus negotiations were carried on to mislead the Swiss. On 5 February 1798, Brune officially took command of the still-separated divisions of Schauenburg and his former unit, now under Philippe Romain Mesnard. Converging on Bern, both divisions entered the city on 5 March after scattered fighting.

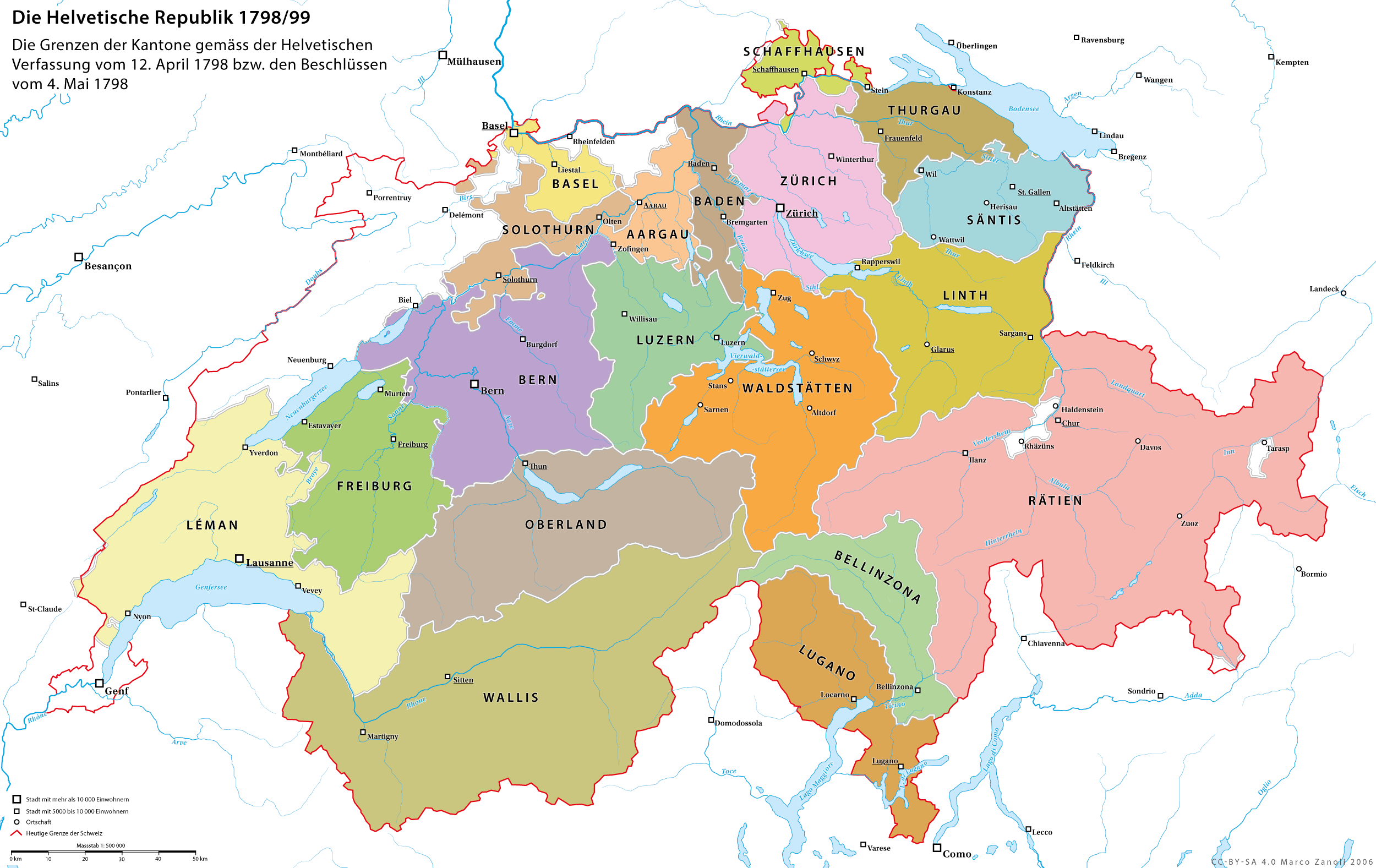
Helvetic Republic, 12 April 1798

On 8 March 1798 Brune was appointed to lead the Army of Italy. He left for his new command on 29 March and Schauenburg was named the new army commander. Meanwhile, cash and gold worth 10 million francs were seized of which three million helped finance Napoleon Bonaparte's French campaign in Egypt and Syria. In addition, 293 cannons, 38 howitzers and 32 mortars were taken to Huningue and Carouge. Though the two countries became allies on 19 August 1798, many Swiss were not happy with their new French overlords. The French soldiers were kept busy suppressing revolts in Valais (Wallis) and other cantons. During his tenure, Schauenburg got Nicolas Oudinot transferred to his army. Schauenburg was an excellent organizer but not a first-rate general like his successor. On 11 December, he relinquished command to André Masséna and assumed the role of Inspector General of Infantry. At this time the Army of Helvetia counted 24,000 veteran troops, including 1,600 cavalry.

By invading Switzerland, the French government had unwittingly opened up a new avenue for the Coalition forces to invade France. Along its borders with Belgium and Germany, France was well-protected by a belt of fortresses. But in the Jura Mountains on the Swiss frontier, there were only a few places like Fort de Joux and Salins-les-Bains guarding the region of Franche-Comté. Lazare Carnot regretfully noted that when Switzerland was neutral, France could ignore their common border. However, with Switzerland a belligerent, the French must deploy 40,000 soldiers to either occupy the country or watch the frontier.

=== Outbreak of war ===
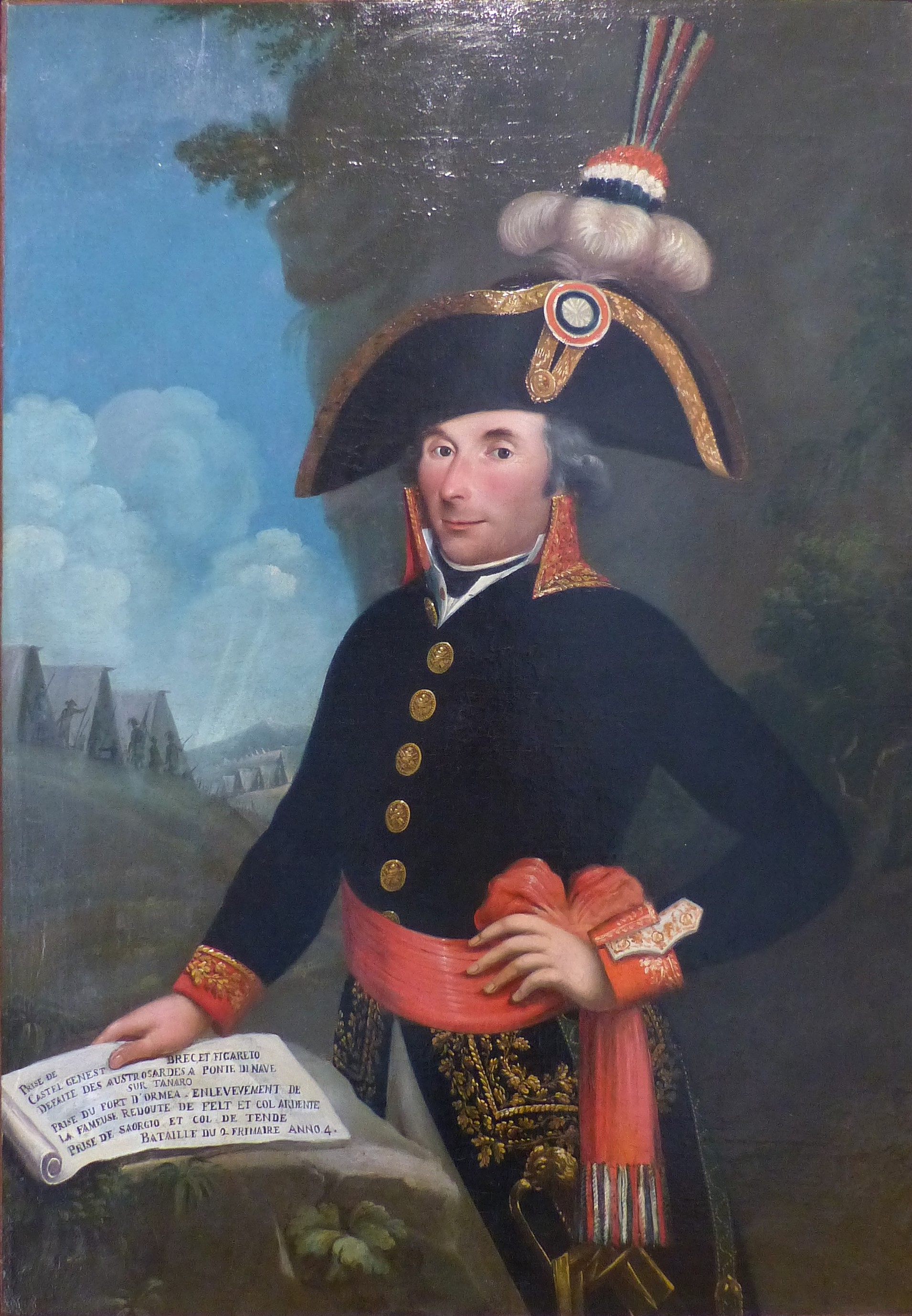
André Masséna in 1796

French aggression in Switzerland, Ottoman Egypt, Holland, Malta, the Kingdom of Piedmont-Sardinia and the Papal States caused the formation of the Second Coalition against her. The United Kingdom soon brought Austria, the Russian Empire, the Kingdom of Naples, the Kingdom of Portugal and Ottoman Turkey into the Coalition. Attacking early, King Ferdinand IV of Naples briefly drove the French from Rome in November 1798. However, a French army under Jean Étienne Championnet soon routed the Neapolitan army and by 23 January 1799 had conquered Naples, forcing Ferdinand to flee to Sicily.

By this time it was obvious to the French Directory that war was imminent and 200,000 conscripts were called up. Aside from Bonaparte's forces in Egypt, the French were divided into five poorly-equipped armies. Masséna was in Switzerland with 30,000 men, Brune defended Holland with over 20,000 soldiers, Jean-Baptiste Jourdan held Alsace with 37,000 troops, Barthélemy Louis Joseph Schérer had 58,000 men in northern Italy and Jacques MacDonald (who succeeded Championnet) counted 30,000 soldiers in central and southern Italy. In addition, there was a reserve force commanded by Jean-Baptiste Bernadotte threatening Mannheim and Philippsburg. The Directory ordered Masséna to seize the Vorarlberg and Graubünden (Grisons, Rhätien) and advance on the County of Tyrol. Jourdan was instructed to cross the Rhine River, transit the Black Forest and link its right wing with Masséna's left. Schérer was directed to link with Masséna's right while resisting the Austrians near Verona. The Austrians had 75,000 men in northern Italy under Paul Kray, 18,000 troops in the Tyrol led by Count Heinrich von Bellegarde, 26,000 soldiers in the Vorarlberg and Graubünden under Friedrich Freiherr von Hotze and 80,000 men led by Archduke Charles, Duke of Teschen on the Lech River in southern Germany.

== Campaign and Battle ==
=== Chur and 1st Feldkirch ===
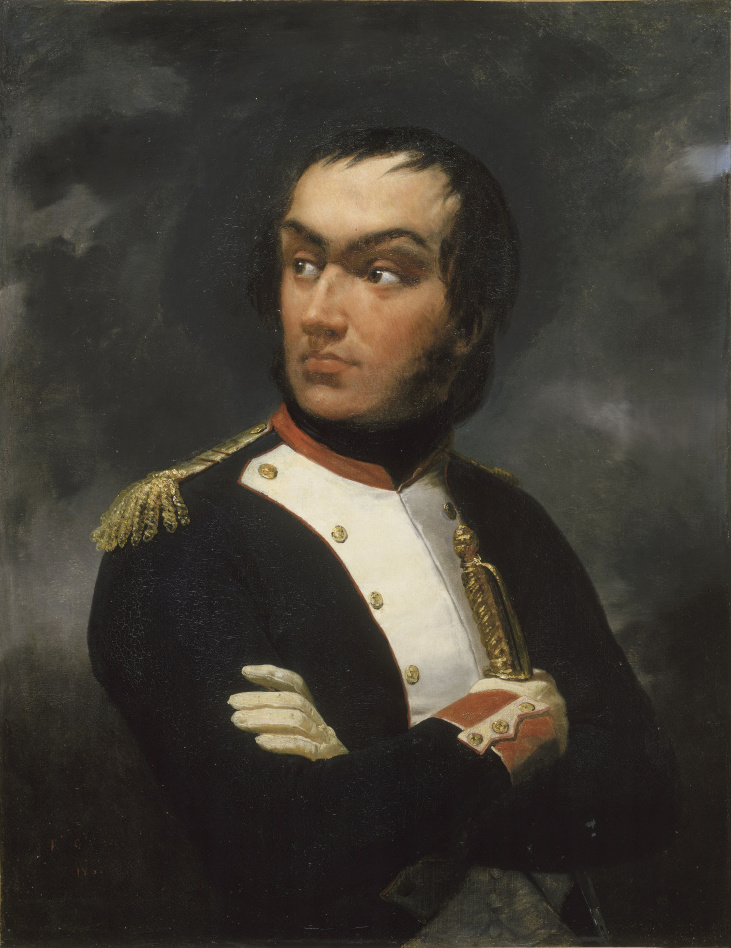
Nicolas Oudinot

In February, Masséna's right flank was held by Claude Lecourbe's division, with its extreme right at Bellinzona. Mesnard's center division was posted south of Lake Constance near Glarus and Schwyz. Charles Antoine Xaintrailles's left flank division, including Oudinot's brigade, defended the Rhine from Lake Constance to Basel. Hotze had 20,000 troops at Bregenz and Feldkirch while Franz Xaver von Auffenberg held Chur with 4,500 men. Though war had not been declared, Jourdan notified Masséna that he would cross the Rhine on 1 March and be near Lake Constance by the 6th. Therefore, Masséna launched an assault crossing of the Rhine on 6 March at Luzisteig (Maienfeld), which was between Hotze and Auffenberg. The Austrian defenses were strong and the river was rising, but the French finally captured the place in the evening. Masséna committed 5,000 to the battle and sustained 300 casualties. The Austrians had 4,200 troops in the area but they were spread out with no reserves. Consequently, they lost 400 killed and wounded plus 1,450 soldiers, 12 guns and three colors captured. Another source stated that the Austrians lost only 1,100 prisoners and five guns.

On the 7th Masséna turned south and attacked Auffenberg at Chur. He sent his light infantry around the Austrian right to block escape by the Plessur valley. One source asserted that Auffenberg lost 3,000 prisoners, 16 guns and his supply magazines. Another source stated that the Austrians lost 1,000 prisoners and four guns out of a total of 2,400 men. The French suffered only 100 killed and wounded out of 9,600 soldiers. Meanwhile, Oudinot's brigade crossed the Rhine on a wagon bridge and moved north toward Feldkirch. Hotze attacked Oudinot outside Feldkirch with a numerically equal force. The battle hung in the balance until Jean Thomas Guillaume Lorge arrived with reinforcements sent by Masséna. Toward evening Oudinot led a cavalry charge which flung Hotze back into the town. The French captured 1,000 Austrian soldiers and four guns. Another authority gave French casualties as 200 out of 9,000 and Austrian casualties as 1,100 out of 6,000. Not all the French forces were successful. Marching from the Saint Gotthard Pass, Louis Henri Loison's brigade was mauled by an Austrian-Swiss force near Disentis.

=== 2nd Feldkirch ===
Meanwhile, Lecourbe's 10,000-man division embarked on the remarkable Engadine Campaign. By 12 March, Lecourbe reached the upper Inn River. By now the Army of Helvetia was 34,992-strong, but this campaign isolated Lecourbe from the rest of the army. On 9 March 1799, the French Directory realized that having many independent armies was a bad idea and subordinated Masséna to Jourdan. A furious Masséna submitted his resignation on the 16th. The government was firm in its decision however, and Masséna finally backed down and agreed to remain in command. It is possible that the drama may have made Masséna overly-aggressive in the next few days. By 19 March Jourdan's army was coming abreast of Masséna, with its right flank division under Pierre Marie Barthélemy Ferino on Lake Constance. Jourdan asked Masséna to link with Ferino at Bregenz. On the 20th Archduke Charles ordered Hotze to reinforce his army with 10,000 troops drawn from the Vorarlberg.

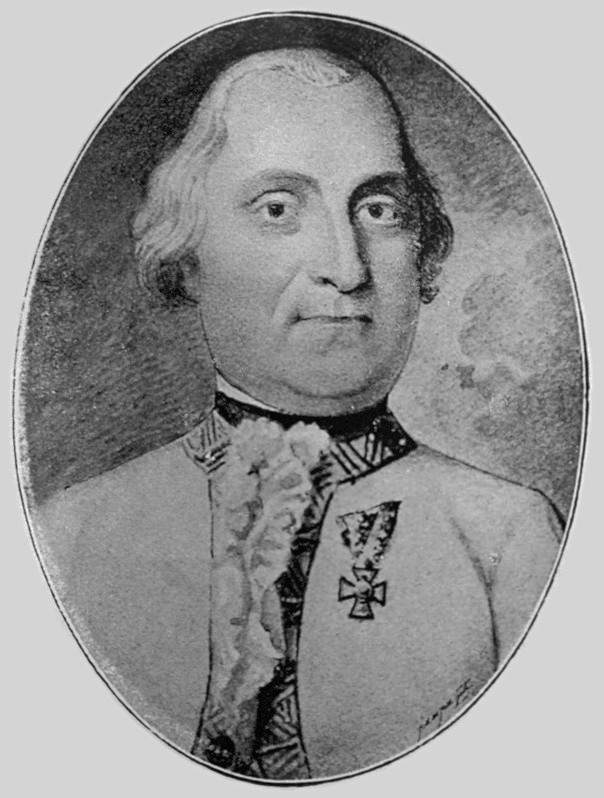
Franz Jellacic – victor

Masséna planned to have Xaintrailles make a feint on Bregenz while his center struck Feldkirch. Masséna had scouted the Austrian defenses, which were entrenched, but he believed that Hotze's absence provided him with an opportunity. As far back as 15 March, Oudinot had suggested an attack on Feldkirch. Then, on 22 March, an order from Jourdan was received, directing Masséna to attack Feldkirch. Masséna accelerated his planned assault by one day by attacking on 23 March 1799 and thus losing the effect of the feint on Bregenz. The attack was launched in four columns, including one led by Oudinot and another by Masséna in person.

Feldkirch was held by Franz Jellacic who was described as, "able within reasonable limits" and having "true fighting fervor". Lying on the Ill River, the town was protected by a line of fieldworks across the main road, backed by a second line of works. The flanks were guarded by several redoubts and abatis. Jellacic's 5,500-strong command included the 3rd Battalions of Infantry Regiments Kaunitz Nr. 20 and De Vins Nr. 37 and three Grenz Infantry battalions. These were the 3rd Battalion of Peterwardeiner Nr. 9, 2nd battalion of St. George Nr. 6, and the 1st battalion of Broder Nr. 7. There were also two squadrons of cavalry and supporting militia.

The leftmost attack column crossed the Ill downstream at the hamlet of Noffles early in the morning. It was supposed to veer to the right and get behind Jellacic's defenses, but it was repulsed. The left-center column assaulted the Blasenberg height but it too was defeated. A third column to the left of the main road attacked the Saint Michael's Wood but met the same fate as the other columns. Masséna sent 12 battalions charging up the main road while a small force tried a right hook around the flank of the entrenchments. The flanking force made headway before being stalled. Jellacic made economical use of his outnumbered force. Masséna's main assault in front failed and was sent on its way by a final counterattack by Jellacic's men. In the early going the French troops captured about 500 prisoners and seemed to be on the verge of victory, but the heavy defensive fire and rocks thrown at them finally turned them back.

== Results ==
The Austrians lost 900 killed, wounded and missing. One authority listed 1,500 French casualties, but two other sources estimated their losses as 3,000. On the 24th, Masséna got news that Jourdan had been defeated by Charles at the Battle of Ostrach on 21 March and was retreating. This meant that the battle had been fought for nothing. Jourdan's Army of the Danube was beaten again at the Battle of Stockach on the 25th. With Jourdan in full retreat, Charles could easily strike at Zürich. So Masséna ordered Lecourbe to abandon the Engadin valley. On 5 April Masséna replaced Jourdan in charge of the Army of the Danube. He gave Mesnard command of the Army of Helvetia and started for Strasbourg. Ferino soon replaced Mesnard. Oudinot was promoted to general of division for his efforts. For his distinguished actions, Jellacic received the Knight's Cross of the Military Order of Maria Theresa on 6 April 1799. He was promoted Feldmarschall-Leutnant on 29 October 1800 and appointed Inhaber of Infantry Regiment Nr. 62 on 1 January 1802.
