= Battle of Schwyz =

Coordinates: 47°1′0″N 8°39′0″E

Battle of Schwyz im Muttenthal
- Part of the War of the Second Coalition
Date	14 – 15 August 1799
Location	Schwyz, Switzerland
Result	French victory

Belligerents
France	Austria

Commanders and leaders
André Masséna	Franz, Freiherr von Jellachich

Strength
12,000	8,000

Casualties and losses
600	2,400 and six cannons

Battle of Schwyz im Muttenthal occurred on 14–15 August 1799 between French forces commanded by General of Division André Masséna and Major General von Franz Jellachich's brigade. The French lost 500 killed, wounded or missing, and the Austrians lost 2,400 men and six guns.
