= Zalaapáti =

- Village
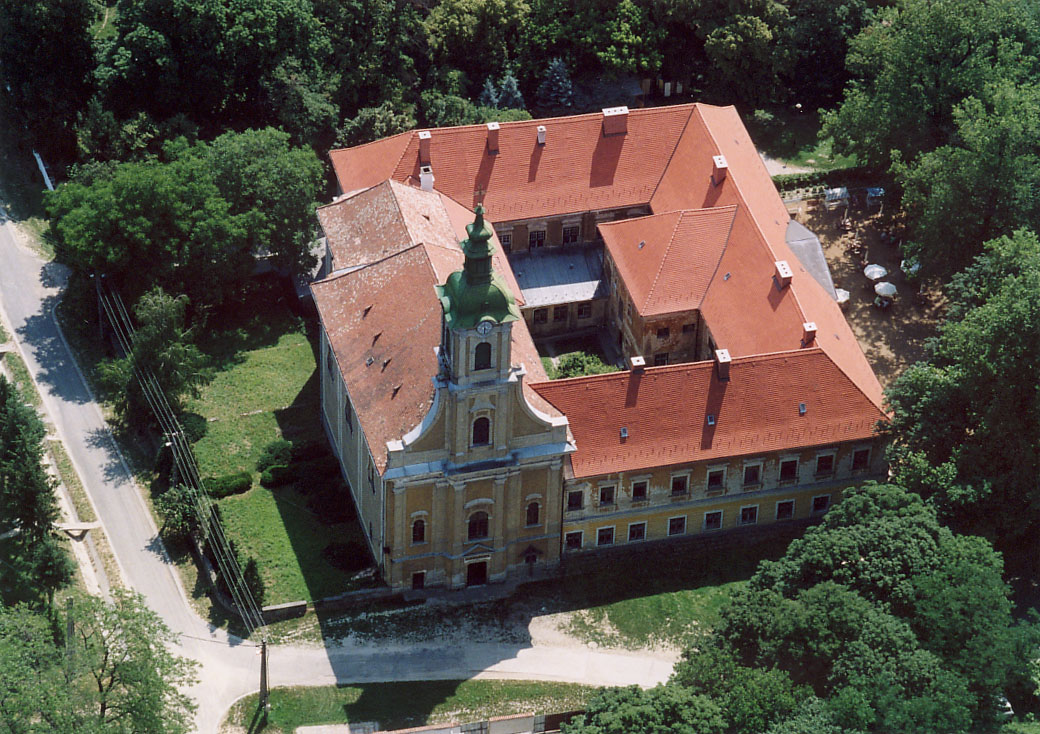

- Flag Coat of arms

- Location of Zalaapáti
- Coordinates: 46.72629°N 17.10657°E
- Country: Hungary
- Region: Western Transdanubia
- County: Zala
- District: Keszthely

Area
  - Total: 23.42 km^{2} (9.04 sq mi)

Population (1 January 2026)
  - Total: 1,654
  - Density: 70.62/km^{2} (182.9/sq mi)
- Time zone: UTC+1 (CET)
  - Summer (DST): UTC+2 (CEST)
- Postal code: 8741
- Area code: (+36) 83
- Website: www.zalaapati.hu

Zalaapáti is a village in Zala County, Hungary.
