= First Battle of Marengo =

1799 battle of the War of the Second Coalition

First Battle of Marengo (1799)
- Part of Suvorov's Italian campaign in the War of the Second Coalition
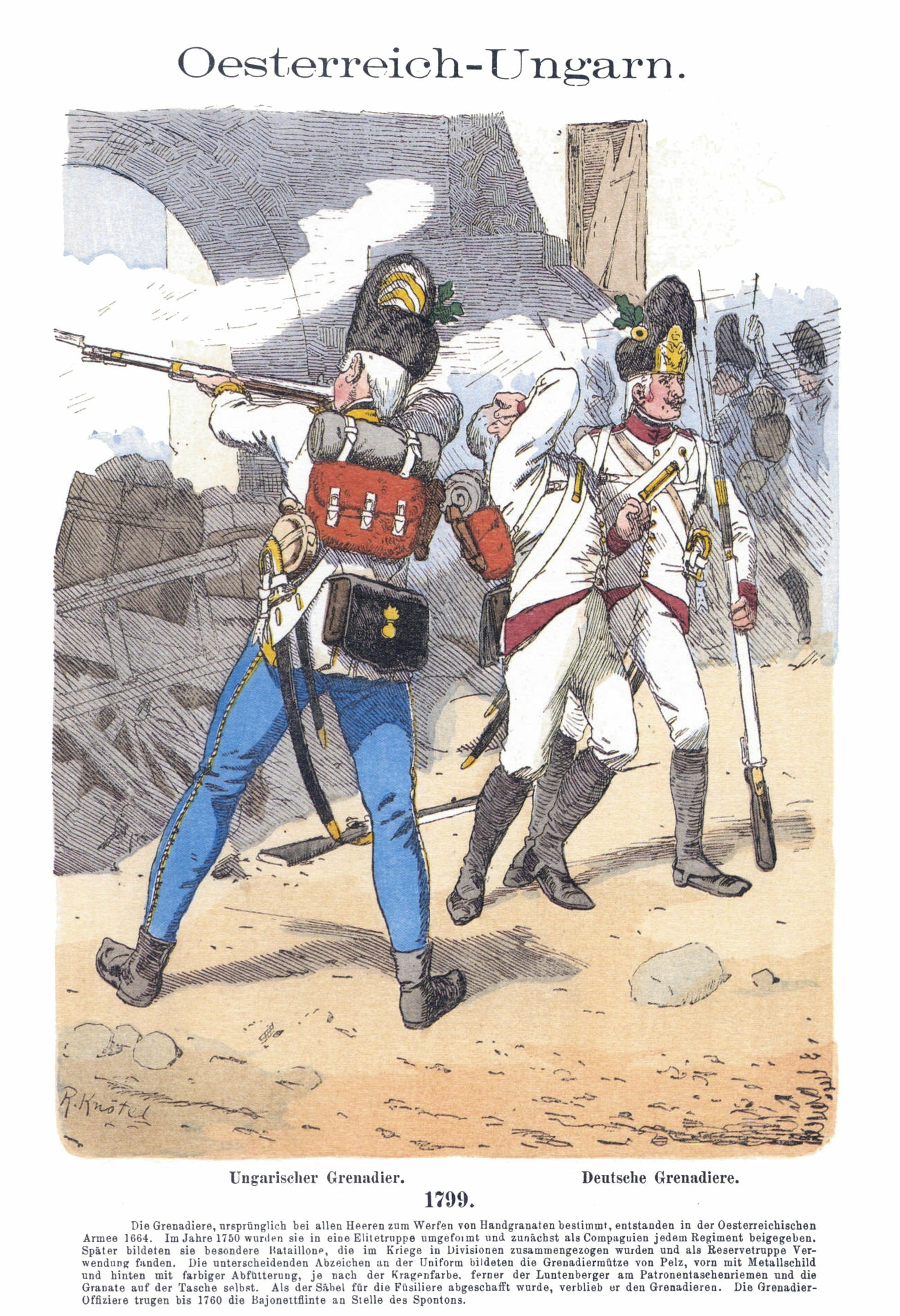
- Habsburg Austrian grenadiers fought at First Marengo.
Date	16 May 1799
Location	Spinetta Marengo, present-day Italy 44°53′N 8°41′E
Result	Allied victory
Territorial changes	Suvorov's Austro-Russian forces occupy the Piedmontese Republic

Belligerents
(French First Republic) French Republic: • Piedmontese Republic; • Helvetic Republic	Russian Empire; Habsburg monarchy

Commanders and leaders
Jean Moreau (Note: He and Suvorov had little direct involvement in the battle, but despite this, they were fully responsible for the fact that the battle took place.); Claude-Victor Perrin; Gaspard Gardanne; Luigi Colli Ricci	Alexander Suvorov (Note: He and Moreau had little direct involvement in the battle, but despite this, they were fully responsible for the fact that the battle took place.); Pyotr Bagration; Franz de Lusignan; Konrad von Kaim; Anton Mittrowsky

Strength
5,000–8,000 (Note: 5,000+ (only Victor's engaged division, without the add. 2,000 cavalry); ~6,000; 7,000; ~7,500; 8,000.)	11,000–16,500 (Note: Initially 5,374, i.e. Lusignan Division's strength, which took the brunt of the French assault (excl. Karaczay's outposts).: 11,000 (11 battalions, 9 squadrons); ~14,000; 14,608; 16,500. Total per Smith: 9,000 7,500 Total per Acerbi: 10,447 4,161)

Casualties and losses
500 to 1,500 (Note: 500 (incl. 100 taken prisoner); 569; 600 (incl. 100 taken prisoner); 1,500.)	150 to 720 (Note: 150; 454; 480; 500; 600; 710; 720 (incl. 273 missing).)

The First Battle of Marengo or Battle of San Giuliano (16 May 1799; Julian calendar: 5 May) saw Republican French soldiers under General of Division Jean Victor Marie Moreau launch a reconnaissance in force against a larger force of Habsburg Austrian and Imperial Russian troops led by Field Marshal Alexander Suvorov. The French enjoyed initial success, pressing back their opponents. However, large Austrian and Russian reinforcements soon arrived, causing the French to withdraw into Alessandria. This War of the Second Coalition meeting engagement occurred near the town of Spinetta Marengo, located just east of Alessandria in northwest Italy.

A series of Austrian and Russian victories in the spring of 1799 drove the French armies from north and northeast Italy. The commander of the combined Austro-Russian armies, Suvorov massed his forces opposite the fortress city of Alessandria. After a Russian force received a costly repulse in the Battle of Bassignana, Moreau sent General of Division Claude Perrin Victor's division to discover the Austro-Russian positions. After the action, Moreau sent half of his army into Genoa while taking the other half to the west. Meanwhile, Suvorov marched his troops up the north bank of the Po River to capture Turin.

== Background ==
The start of the 1799 campaign saw the Austrian army of Feldzeugmeister Paul Kray facing the French Army of Italy under General of Division Barthélemy Louis Joseph Schérer. The drawn Battle of Verona on 26 March was followed by the Battle of Magnano on 5 April, when Kray's 46,000 men won an important victory over 40,500 French soldiers. The demoralized Schérer left 6,600 men to the garrison of Mantua and abandoned northeast Italy. The Siege of Mantua lasted until the end of July, but other garrisons that Schérer left behind were soon forced to surrender. Counting garrisons and battle losses, the Army of Italy had only 28,000 soldiers. At this time, Suvorov arrived with 24,551 Russian soldiers and took command of the combined Austro-Russian army.

Schérer resigned and handed over command of the army to Moreau on 26 April 1799. The next day, Suvorov attacked and won the Battle of Cassano. General of Division Jean-Mathieu-Philibert Sérurier and 2,400 men of his division were isolated and forced to surrender that evening. Moreau with General of Division Paul Grenier's division retreated west all the way to Turin, then crossed to the south bank of the Po River and marched east again. Victor's division crossed the Po at Casale Monferrato and took position near the fortress city of Alessandria. When Grenier joined Victor there on 7 May, Moreau mustered about 20,000 troops. The French were deployed between Alessandria on their right and Valenza on their left. At this time, Catherine-Dominique de Pérignon led a division from France to occupy Genoa.

On 6 May 1799, Suvorov's left wing crossed the Po at Piacenza and moved southwest toward Bobbio, threatening to cut Moreau off from Genoa. Suvorov's main body crossed the Po farther west. On 7 May, a 13,865-man Austrian corps was at Castel San Giovanni while General-major Pyotr Bagration with the 5,862-man Russian advance guard was at Voghera, both on the south bank of the Po. General Andrei Grigorevich Rosenberg with 10,571 soldiers was at Dorno with a 3,075-man advance guard at Lomello, both on the north bank. General-major Josef Philipp Vukassovich and 5,100 Austrians were farther west, also on the north bank. On 9 May, Suvorov's chief of staff, the Austrian General-major Johann Gabriel Chasteler de Courcelles and two battalions chased the French out of the town of Tortona, though its citadel held out. Wanting to mass his army on the south bank, Suvorov issued orders to Rosenberg to cross the Po at Alluvioni Cambiò, downstream from the confluence of the Po and Tanaro rivers.

Probably urged by Grand Duke Constantine Pavlovich of Russia, who had just arrived at the front and was anxious to fight, Rosenberg ignored Suvorov's instructions and crossed upstream of the point where the Tanaro flowed into the Po. The result was that Rosenberg's advance guard ran into strong resistance from Grenier's division. In the Battle of Bassignana on 12 May 1799, Moreau gave the Russians a drubbing and forced them to retreat to the north bank of the Po. Though Suvorov was fully aware of Constantine's culpability, the official responsibility for the fiasco was placed on Rosenberg's shoulders.

During this time, the Army of Naples under General of Division Jacques MacDonald was moving north from southern Italy and entering the calculations of both Moreau and Suvorov. On 10 May 1799, MacDonald reached Rome where he left 2,568 of his least fit men under the command of General of Division Gabriel Venance Rey. On 26 May, the Army of Naples reached Florence where it met troops under General of Division Paul Louis Gaultier de Kervéguen. The French troops moved through an area where the local people were in rebellion, such that one column of 3,000 French lost 600 men as casualties. Altogether, MacDonald wielded a field army of 36,728 troops in the infantry divisions of Generals of Division Jean-Baptiste Olivier, Jean-Baptiste Dominique Rusca, and Joseph Hélie Désiré Perruquet de Montrichard, and Generals of Brigade François Watrin, Jan Henryk Dąbrowski, and Jean-Baptiste Salme. This array would soon be joined by Victor.

== Battle ==
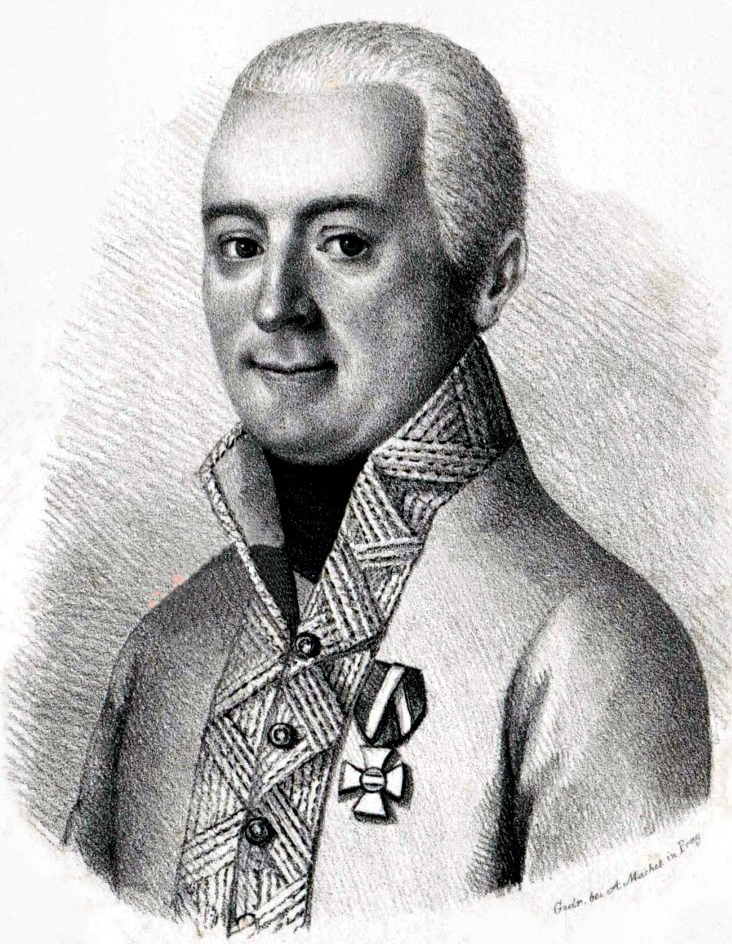
Franz de Lusignan

As early as 10 May, the Cossack regiments of Denisov, Grekov, and Molchanov, supported by the Kalemin Grenadier Battalion, cleared the French from Marengo. The Austrians were massed east of the village of San Giuliano while Bagration's Russian vanguard was at Novi Ligure. Starting on 13 May, Suvorov began edging his south bank forces toward the north because he intended to cross the Po and march west toward Turin. He wanted his troops to begin crossing the Po at Alluvioni Cambiò on 16 May, but other events intervened. Earlier, Moreau believed that Suvorov was going to march against MacDonald, but now he thought that the Russian was not going south after all. From 13–15 May, the French commander concentrated his army behind the Bormida River, throwing a bridge of boats across the stream. On 16 May, Moreau sent Victor on a strong reconnaissance east toward Tortona.

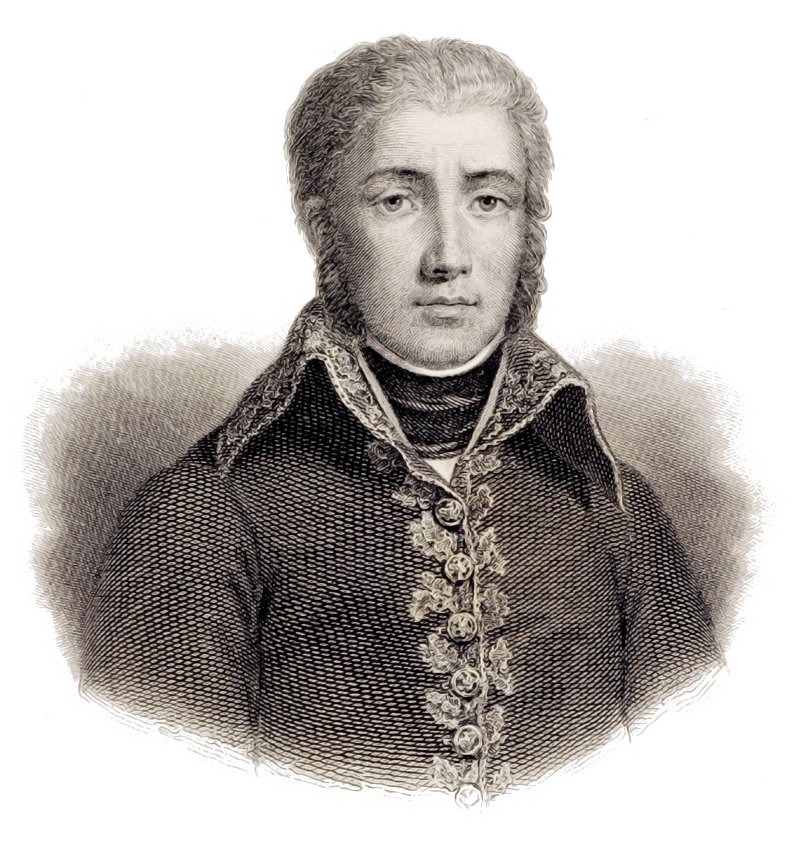
Jean Victor Moreau

The French crossed the Bormida at a point called The Cedars. At 8:00 am they split into two columns with General of Brigade Louis Léonard (Luigi Leonardo) Colli-Ricci on the left and General of Brigade Gaspard Amédée Gardanne on the right. The 74th Line Infantry acted as an advance guard. Colonel Louis Gareau with two battalions guarded the Bormida bridge. The French cavalry crossed the river upstream. Altogether the French employed 7,500 troops in the operation. General-major Adrian Karpovich Denisov, commanding the Cossack screen captured a French officer and learned that the enemy incursion was substantial. He sent appeals for help to Bagration. The 74th Line quickly brushed aside the Cossacks and drove the Allied outposts from Marengo, Spinetta, and Cascina Grossa. The outposts were manned by General-major Andreas Karaczay's Advanced Guard, but these troops did not otherwise participate in the ensuing action.

General-major Franz Joseph, Marquis de Lusignan, acting division commander in the absence of Michael von Fröhlich, deployed seven battalions and six squadrons of the Lobkowitz Dragoon Regiment Nr. 10. Soon Bagration came up with his Russians and the Allies formed two lines about 2,500 feet (760 m) west of San Giuliano. As the two sides advanced toward each other, the French sang the Marseillaise while the Austrian military bands played. Lusignan placed the Weber and Pertussy Grenadier Battalions on the right and the Stuart Infantry Regiment Nr. 18 and Morzin Grenadier Battalion on the left. In second line were the Paar and Schiaffinati Grenadier Battalions. A skirmish line was formed by taking ten soldiers from each company in the front line. Two squadrons of the Lobkowitz Dragoons and some artillery were posted on each flank, with more dragoons in reserve.

Denisov reported that the French troops maintained a rolling fire by platoons. He claimed that Bagration's troops hung back in a wood and that neither the Cossacks nor the Austrian dragoons were willing to charge the French infantry. This caused the Austrians to bear the brunt of the combat and they were hustled to the rear by the French. Another account stated that Bagration's troops helped repulse the initial attack, but around noon the Allies began to retreat. Finally, Feldmarschall-Leutnant Konrad Valentin von Kaim's 4,800-man Austrian division came up on the left flank. The Cossacks claimed to have wiped out a squadron of the French 1st Hussars, taking 78 prisoners.

At about 4:00 pm, Moreau realized he was heavily outnumbered and issued the order to retreat. The French carried out their withdrawal in good order. They defended Marengo very stoutly, using the manor house and the streams in the vicinity. The French relinquished Marengo at 5:00 pm, crossed the Bormida, and dismantled their bridge by 6:30 pm. Suvorov appeared and demanded to know why the French were being allowed to escape. By this time, the French had reached a position where it was impossible to cut them off. In another account, Suvorov got to the battlefield earlier and tried to rally the Austrians, who were retreating at that time.

== Result ==
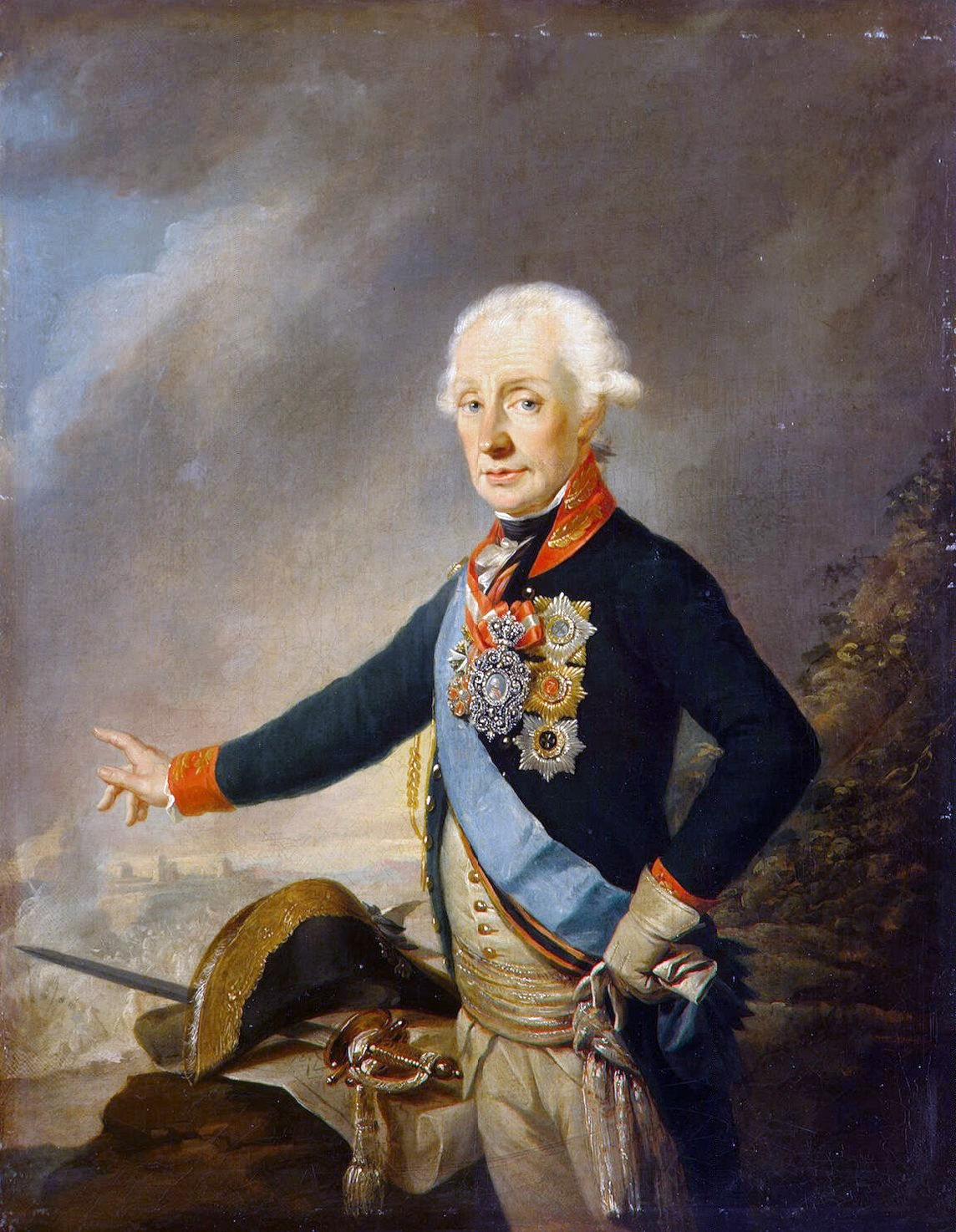
Alexander Suvorov

Historian Christopher Duffy stated that Allied casualties were between 480 and 710, while French losses were between 500 and 1,500. A second source asserted that the Allies lost 43 dead, 404 wounded, and 273 missing for a total of 720. The French lost 569 dead and wounded. Digby Smith gave Austrian losses as 97 killed and 250 wounded, and Russian losses as 27 killed and 80 wounded. These figures give a total Allied loss of 124 killed and 330 wounded, or 454 casualties, while French losses are estimated at 500 casualties. On the French side 8,000 troops were engaged, while there were 9,000 Austrians and 7,500 Russians involved in the action. Smith wrote that a French battalion was cut off near the river and that many soldiers drowned. Other sources do not mention this incident. Gaston Bodart stated the same number of French, and 11,000 Coalition. He gave 150 Coalition losses and 500 French.

Moreau's reconnaissance-in-force failed to reveal his opponent's intentions through unlucky timing. If the French army commander attacked the following day, Suvorov would have been gone. The 16 May battle convinced Moreau to abandon the Italian plain and get his army to the south side of the Ligurian Alps. Assuming that Suvorov intended to remain where he was, Moreau sent Victor with 7,000 infantry, 200 cavalry, but no artillery on a march to join Pérignon in Genoa. Since Piedmont was in revolt against French occupation, Victor's troops had to fight their way through the insurgents, arriving in Genoa on 22 May. Another 2,000-man column under Louis Lemoine moved from Gavi to Genoa.

With Grenier's division, most of the cavalry, and all of the artillery, Moreau tried to get through the mountains but was prevented by the insurgents. Instead he moved west to Asti on 18 May 1799 and then circled south of Turin. He ensured that a convoy from Rivoli and Pinerolo made it across the Mont Cenis Pass. However, he failed to secure a mass of artillery in the Turin arsenal. With about 10,000 men, Moreau marched south to Cherasco and Cuneo. Turning east to Mondovì, the French found that the rebels had captured Ceva. With Emmanuel Grouchy commanding a flank guard, the French column wended its way through the mountains to Loano on 6 June, from which they shipped their artillery to Genoa. Grenier's troops reached Genoa around 12 June. Historian Ramsay Weston Phipps compared this circuitous march to the movements of "a frightened hen".

Suvorov's army crossed to the north bank of the Po and was in Chivasso by 25 May 1799. The Allied army drove the French from Turin into the citadel on 27 May and seized a large number of heavy cannons in the arsenal. These weapons would soon help the Austrians reduce the French garrisons of Alessandria, Tortona and other places. Heinrich von Bellegarde's Austrian corps marched from Switzerland to the area of Alessandria, replacing Suvorov's troops.

A month after the first battle of Marengo, the Second Battle of Marengo (20 June) would occur here, a minor setback for the Allies. It happened literally alongside the Battle of the Trebbia (17–20 June).

== Forces ==
=== French order of battle ===
Jean Victor Marie Moreau's forces at First Marengo
Divisions	Brigades	Units	Unit Commanders
Division Victor; General of Division; Claude Perrin Victor	Colonel; Antoine-Alexandre Rousseaux	(France) 74th Line Demi-Brigade	Antoine-Alexandre Rousseaux
Division Victor; General of Division; Claude Perrin Victor	General of Brigade; Luigi Leonardo Colli-Ricci	(France) 17th Light Infantry Demi-Brigade, 3 battalions	Dominique Honoré Antoine Vedel
Division Victor; General of Division; Claude Perrin Victor	General of Brigade; Luigi Leonardo Colli-Ricci	(France) 14th Line Infantry Demi-brigade	Jean Claude Moreau
Division Victor; General of Division; Claude Perrin Victor	General of Brigade; Luigi Leonardo Colli-Ricci	(France) 68th Line Infantry Demi-brigade, 2nd Battalion	Jules-Alexander Boutrouë
Division Victor; General of Division; Claude Perrin Victor	General of Brigade; Luigi Leonardo Colli-Ricci	(France) 1st Hussar Regiment	Joseph Denis Picard
Division Victor; General of Division; Claude Perrin Victor	General of Brigade; Gaspard Amédée Gardanne	(France) 18th Light Infantry Demi-Brigade, 3 battalions	Louis-Stanislaus-Xavier Soyez
Division Victor; General of Division; Claude Perrin Victor	General of Brigade; Gaspard Amédée Gardanne	(Kingdom of Sardinia) 1st Infantry Demi-Brigade, 2nd Battalion Aosta	-
Division Victor; General of Division; Claude Perrin Victor	General of Brigade; Gaspard Amédée Gardanne	(Kingdom of Sardinia) 3rd Infantry Demi-brigade, 2nd Battalion Regina	-
Division Victor; General of Division; Claude Perrin Victor	General of Brigade; Gaspard Amédée Gardanne	(Switzerland) 1st Swiss Legion Battalion	-
Division Victor; General of Division; Claude Perrin Victor	General of Brigade; Gaspard Amédée Gardanne	(Kingdom of Sardinia) Artillery Company	-
Division Victor; General of Division; Claude Perrin Victor	General of Brigade; Gaspard Amédée Gardanne	(France) 15th Horse Chasseur Regiment	Louis Lepic
Division Victor; General of Division; Claude Perrin Victor	Colonel; Louis Gareau	(France) 20th Light Infantry Demi-brigade, 1st Battalion	__ Lucotte
Division Victor; General of Division; Claude Perrin Victor	Colonel; Louis Gareau	(France) 106th Line Infantry Demi-brigade, 1st Battalion	__ Dupellin

=== Austro-Russian order of battle ===
Alexander Suvorov's forces at First Marengo
Division	Brigades	Strength	Units	Strength
Advance Guard Division; General-major; Pyotr Bagration	None	4,161	(Russia) 7th Jäger Regiment, 2 battalions	624
Advance Guard Division; General-major; Pyotr Bagration	None	4,161	(Russia) Baranovsky Musketeer Regiment	698
Advance Guard Division; General-major; Pyotr Bagration	None	4,161	(Russia) Rosenberg Grenadier Regiment	627
Advance Guard Division; General-major; Pyotr Bagration	None	4,161	(Russia) Lomonosov Grenadier Regiment	501
Advance Guard Division; General-major; Pyotr Bagration	None	4,161	(Russia) Dendrygin Grenadier Regiment	453
Advance Guard Division; General-major; Pyotr Bagration	None	4,161	(Russia) Molchanov Cossack Regiment	435
Advance Guard Division; General-major; Pyotr Bagration	None	4,161	(Russia) Grekov Cossack Regiment	414
Advance Guard Division; General-major; Pyotr Bagration	None	4,161	(Russia) Posdeev Cossack Regiment	409
Division Lusignan; General-major; Franz Joseph, Marquis de Lusignan	Colonel; Franz Xavier Weber von Treuenfeld	3,398	(Holy Roman Empire) Pertussy Hungarian Grenadier Battalion	618
Division Lusignan; General-major; Franz Joseph, Marquis de Lusignan	Colonel; Franz Xavier Weber von Treuenfeld	3,398	(Holy Roman Empire) Weber Grenadier Battalion	457
Division Lusignan; General-major; Franz Joseph, Marquis de Lusignan	Colonel; Franz Xavier Weber von Treuenfeld	3,398	(Holy Roman Empire) Morzin Grenadier Battalion	582
Division Lusignan; General-major; Franz Joseph, Marquis de Lusignan	Colonel; Franz Xavier Weber von Treuenfeld	3,398	(Holy Roman Empire) Stuart Infantry Regiment Nr. 18, 1st & 2nd Battalions	1,741
Division Lusignan; General-major; Franz Joseph, Marquis de Lusignan	General-major; Hannibal Sommariva	1,976	(Holy Roman Empire) Paar Grenadier Battalion	520
Division Lusignan; General-major; Franz Joseph, Marquis de Lusignan	General-major; Hannibal Sommariva	1,976	(Holy Roman Empire) Schiaffinati Grenadier Battalion	620
Division Lusignan; General-major; Franz Joseph, Marquis de Lusignan	General-major; Hannibal Sommariva	1,976	(Holy Roman Empire) Lobkowitz Dragoon Regiment Nr. 10, 6 squadrons	836
Division Kaim; Feldmarschall-Leutnant; Konrad Valentin von Kaim	General-major; Franz Xavier von Auersperg	1,767	(Holy Roman Empire) Samuel Gyulai Infantry Regiment Nr. 32, 1st Battalion	740
Division Kaim; Feldmarschall-Leutnant; Konrad Valentin von Kaim	General-major; Franz Xavier von Auersperg	1,767	(Holy Roman Empire) Fürstenburg Infantry Regiment Nr. 36, 3rd Battalion	858
Division Kaim; Feldmarschall-Leutnant; Konrad Valentin von Kaim	General-major; Franz Xavier von Auersperg	1,767	(Holy Roman Empire) Kaiser Light Dragoon Regiment Nr. 1, 1 squadron	169
Division Kaim; Feldmarschall-Leutnant; Konrad Valentin von Kaim	General-major; Anton Ferdinand Mittrowsky	3,306	(Holy Roman Empire) Samuel Gyulai Infantry Regiment Nr. 32, 2nd Battalion	742
Division Kaim; Feldmarschall-Leutnant; Konrad Valentin von Kaim	General-major; Anton Ferdinand Mittrowsky	3,306	(Holy Roman Empire) Fürstenburg Infantry Regiment Nr. 36, 1st & 2nd Battalions	1,718
Division Kaim; Feldmarschall-Leutnant; Konrad Valentin von Kaim	General-major; Anton Ferdinand Mittrowsky	3,306	(Holy Roman Empire) Kaiser Light Dragoon Regiment Nr. 1, 6 squadrons	846
Advance Guard; Only its outposts were engaged.	General-major; Andreas Karaczay	5,271	(Holy Roman Empire) ex-Huff Infantry Regiment Nr. 8, 1st, 2nd & 3rd Battalions	2,695
Advance Guard; Only its outposts were engaged.	General-major; Andreas Karaczay	5,271	(Holy Roman Empire) Fröhlich Infantry Regiment Nr. 28, 1st & 2nd Battalions	1,641
Advance Guard; Only its outposts were engaged.	General-major; Andreas Karaczay	5,271	(Holy Roman Empire) Karaczay Light Dragoon Regiment Nr. 4, 6 squadrons	935

== See also ==
- Capture of Brescia
- Battle of Cassano
- Battle of Bassignana
- Battle of Modena
- Battle of the Trebbia
- Second Battle of Marengo
- Battle of Novi

== Notes ==
Preceded by Battle of Bassignana	French Revolution: Revolutionary campaigns Battle of San Giuliano (1799)	Succeeded by First Battle of Zurich
