= Battle of Novi (1799) =

1799 Battle during the War of the Second Coalition

- Part of Suvorov's Italian campaign in the War of the Second Coalition
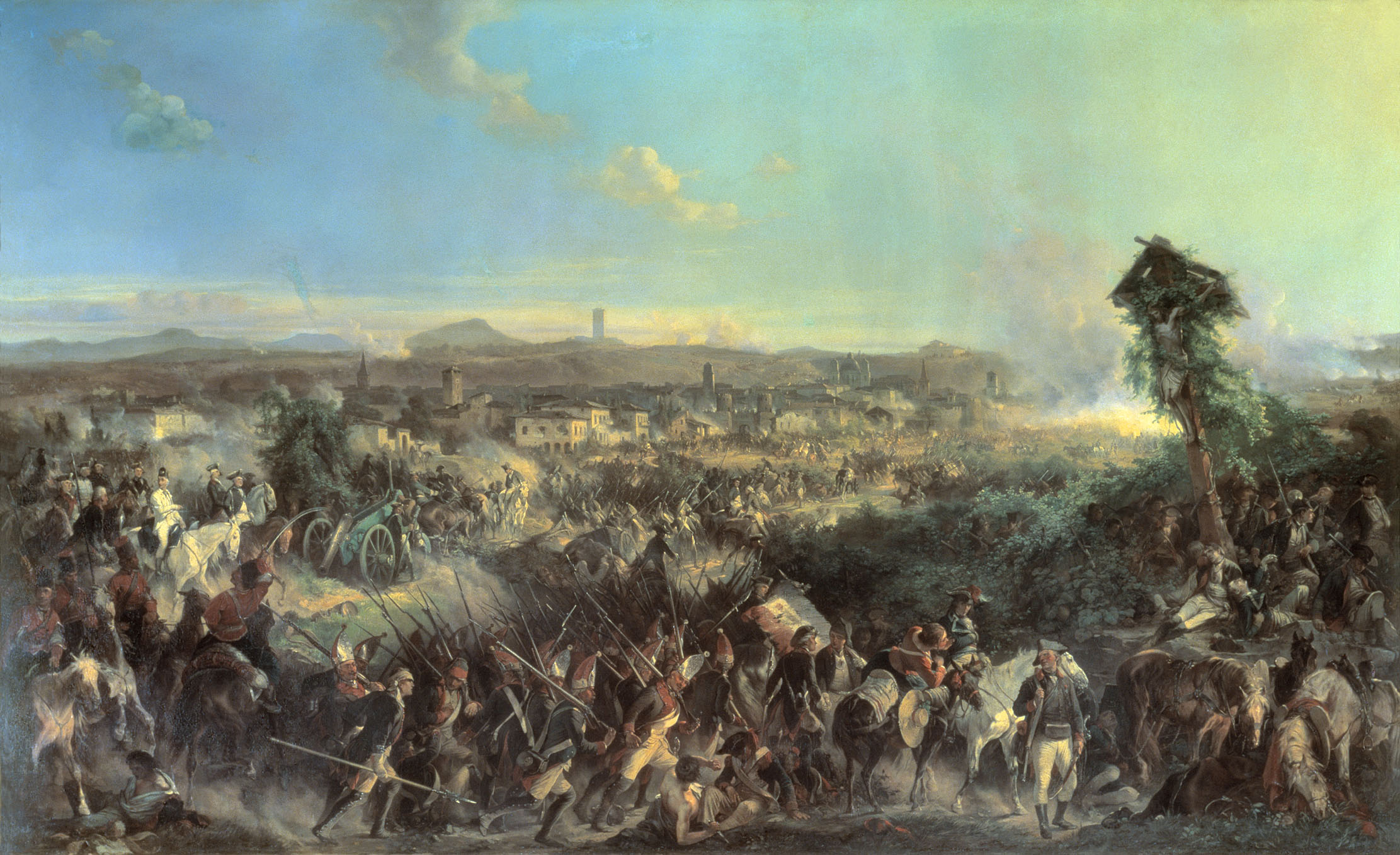
- Battle of Novi, by Alexander Kotzebue
Date	15 August 1799 (Note: 4 August 1799 by Julian calendar)
Location	Novi Ligure, Piedmont, Italy 44°45′42″N 8°47′26″E
Result	Coalition victory

Belligerents
Russian Empire; Habsburg monarchy	(French First Republic) French Republic: • Polish Legion; • Lombard Legion

Commanders and leaders
(Russian Empire) Alexander Suvorov (Russian Empire) Wilhelm Derfelden (Russian Empire) Pyotr Bagration (Russian Empire) Mikhail Miloradovich (Russian Empire) Ivan Förster (Habsburg monarchy) Paul Kray (Habsburg monarchy) Michael von Melas (Habsburg monarchy) Peter Ott (Habsburg monarchy) Heinrich von Bellegarde (Habsburg monarchy) Michael von Fröhlich (Habsburg monarchy) Anton Mittrowsky (Habsburg monarchy) Alexander von Seckendorff (Habsburg monarchy) Johann Nobili	(French First Republic) Barthélemy Joubert † (French First Republic) Jean Moreau (French First Republic) Dominique de Pérignon (POW) (French First Republic) Emmanuel de Grouchy (POW) (French First Republic) Louis Lemoine (French First Republic) Laurent de Gouvion Saint-Cyr (French First Republic) Gaspard Gardanne (French First Republic) François Watrin (French First Republic) Pierre de Laboissière; Jan Dąbrowski

Units involved
See Allied Army	See French Army

Strength
50,000 to 51,547 (Note: 44,347 infantry, 7,200 cavalry (incl. 1,948 Cossack cavalrymen); (Note: The number of artillerymen is unknown.) however, due to the terrain, the cavalry was not very effective. According to the other version, 51,200 men took part in the battle. It also says 34,900 French participated. Other sources claim 50,000 men. Total Allied Field Army strength: 64,700 (89 battalions, 52 squadrons, 6 Cossack regiments—41,000 Austrians, 23,700 Russians/Cossacks; not all of them were involved).); (Habsburg monarchy) ≤35,995; (Russian Empire) ≤15,552	34,930 to 40,000 (Note: According to one count, 32,843 infantrymen and 2,087 cavalrymen (34,930). According to another, 35,487 infantry and 1,765 cavalry (37,252). (Note: The number of artillerymen is unknown.) Due to the terrain and the Coalition's superiority in horsepower, the cavalry was not very vigorous and, moreover, was ineffective. Another source claims as high as 40,000 men. Total Army of Italy strength: ~45,000 (by the end of July 1799 referring to the Julian calendar; not all of them were involved).)

Casualties and losses
8,000–9,000 (Note: 8,000; 8,250; 8,750; 9,000) …other calculations Details: 7,000 dead, wounded; 2,000 prisoners, missings.; 3 guns	9,663–12,000 (Note: 9,663; 11,000; 11,100; 11,500; 12,000) …other calculations Details: 7,000 dead, wounded; 4,000 prisoners, missings.; 37 guns 4 standards
- Location within Europe

War of the Second Coalition:
Italy
current battle
Napoleon in command
Napoleon not in command

The Battle of Novi, (Note: It was the first battle of Novi in 1799.) which took place on 15 August 1799, (Note: 4 August 1799 by Julian calendar) was a battle between a combined army of the Habsburg monarchy and the Imperial Russians under Field Marshal Alexander Suvorov and a Republican French army under General Barthélemy Catherine Joubert. As soon as Joubert fell during the battle, Jean Victor Marie Moreau immediately took overall command of the French forces. After a prolonged and bloody struggle, the Austro-Russians broke through the French defenses and drove their enemies into a disorderly retreat, while French division commanders Catherine-Dominique de Pérignon and Emmanuel Grouchy were captured. Novi Ligure is in the province of Piedmont in Northern Italy a distance of 58 kilometres (36 mi) north of Genoa. The battle occurred during the War of the Second Coalition which was part of the French Revolutionary Wars.

Novi was a strong defensive position situated on steep heights. An old fortress wall from the 15th century surrounded the city. This medieval wall served as a good defense for the French chasseurs. It was damaged in many places, there were breaks, but the French had barricaded all these breaches.

In 1799, Russian and Austrian forces swept across the Po River valley, recapturing lands taken by Napoleon Bonaparte in 1796. The French troops in Italy were badly defeated at the major battles of Magnano, Cassano and the Trebbia. Subsequently, French and Cisalpine Italian troops retreated into Genoa and the Ligurian Republic. A new French government placed Joubert in command of the reformed Army of Italy and ordered him to take the offensive. Accordingly, the French army moved north across the mountain crests and assembled on high ground at Novi Ligure on 14 August. To Joubert's dismay, it was clear that large Coalition forces were nearby. The next morning Paul Kray's Austrian corps assaulted the French left flank and the battle was on. After a delay, Suvorov committed a Russian corps to attack the center, where the walled town of Novi was, and Michael von Melas' Austrian corps to attack the French right flank. Kray's troops suffered heavy losses but by evening the French army was badly beaten and the French hold on the Italian Riviera was gravely weakened. Cavalry proved ineffective in such terrain and was hardly used by either the Allied or French sides. The Russo-Austrians deployed it en masse only to pursue. However, the Coalition planners proceeded to throw away their advantage by sending Suvorov's Russians to Switzerland, a change of strategy that ended badly.

== Background ==
The 1799 campaign in Italy began with the Battle of Verona, a series of costly but indecisive clashes around Verona on 26 March. At the Battle of Magnano on 5 April, the Habsburg Austrian army of Paul Kray triumphed over the Republican French army of Barthélemy Louis Joseph Schérer. While suffering losses of 4,000 killed and wounded and 2,000 captured, Kray's Austrians inflicted casualties of 3,500 killed and wounded and captured 4,500 men, 18 artillery pieces and seven colors from the French. Two days later, a distraught Schérer begged to be relieved of command, but before that happens, he would be defeated again in the small battle with Alexander Suvorov at Lecco on 26 April. Michael von Melas arrived to take command of the Austrian army from Kray on 9 April. Hearing that 12,000 Austrians were approaching from the Tyrol to the north, Schérer abandoned the line of the Mincio River on 12 April. Leaving 12,000 troops in the fortress of Mantua and 1,600 more in Peschiera del Garda, the demoralized French commander ordered his crippled army to withdraw. As the soldiers fell back, the skies opened up and turned the retreat into a sodden nightmare.

On 15 April 1799, the veteran Russian field marshal Alexander Suvorov formally took command of the combined Austro-Russian army in Italy. On 27 April Suvorov defeated the French, now under Jean Victor Marie Moreau, at the Battle of Cassano, and then in the First Battle of Marengo (Battle of San Giuliano) on 16 May. At Cassano, the Allies suffered 2,000 casualties while the French sustained losses of 2,500 killed and wounded plus 5,000 soldiers, 27 guns and three colors captured; the next day a 3,000-man French division was trapped and surrendered at Verderio Superiore, however, the Russians subsequently lost the Battle of Bassignana on 12 May. After the battle of Cassano, the next major action was the Battle of the Trebbia from 17 to 20 June where Suvorov's 37,000-strong Austro-Russian army (only up to 32,656 troops involved) mauled Jacques MacDonald's 33,000-man French army, which had earlier broken through Austrian positions in the Battle of Modena (Note: MacDonald was injured there with two sabre blows.) on 12 June. The Allies suffered 5,500 casualties at the Trebbia, while inflicting 16,500 on the French including the taking of 7,000 prisoners. On 20 June, just as the battle of the Trebbia ended, the Second Battle of Marengo (Battle of Cascina Grossa) took place, where the Austrians suffered a setback. Nevertheless, Coalition forces successfully besieged a number of key fortresses in the meantime. Peschiera fell on 6 May, Milan was captured on 24 May and Turin fell on 20 June after a nine-day siege. Suvorov and his Austrian allies had evicted the French from almost all of Italy, while Archduke Charles, Duke of Teschen beat André Masséna's French army at the First Battle of Zurich on 4–6 June.

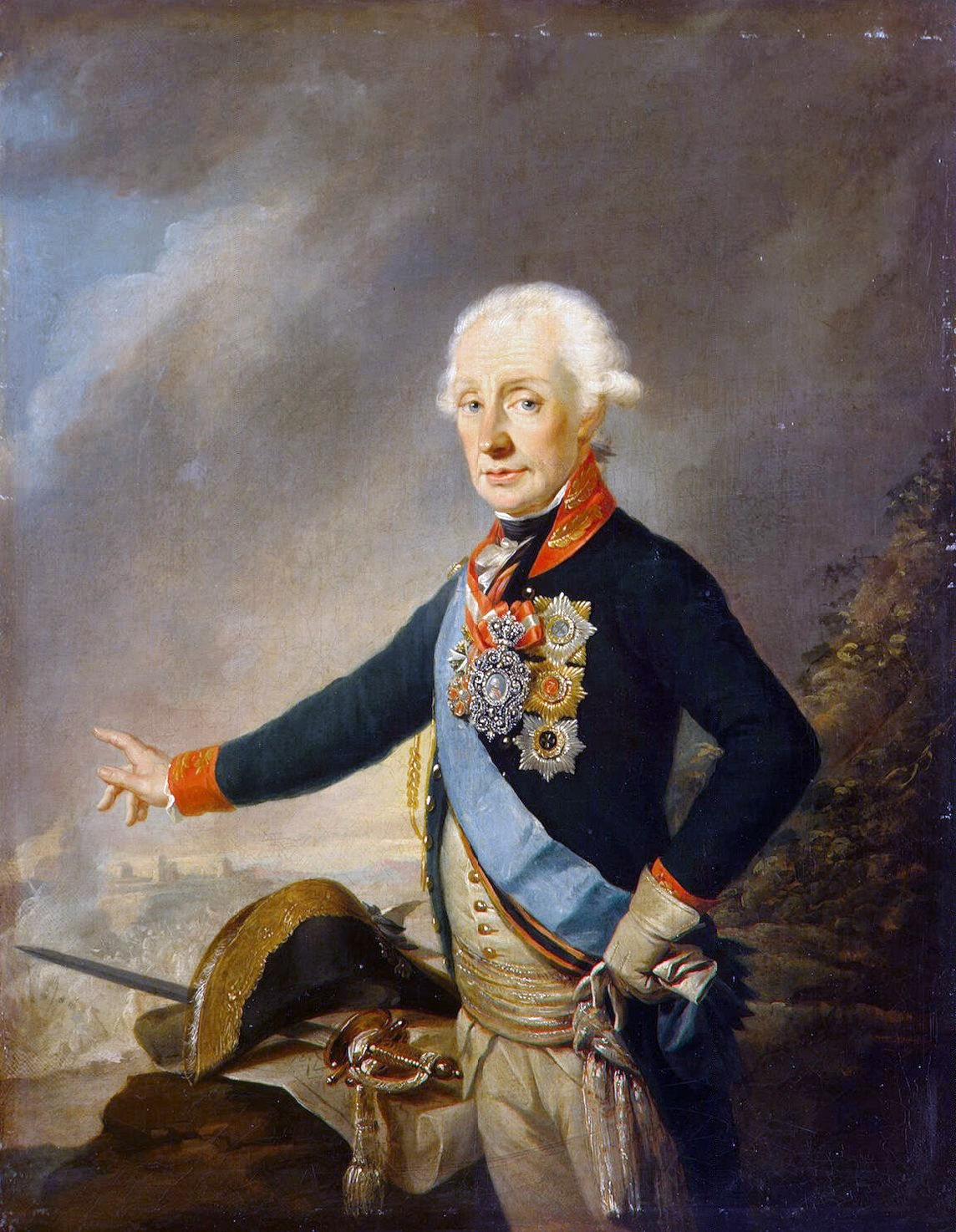
Alexander Suvorov

A day after defeating MacDonald along the Trebbia River, the Allies captured the 17th Light Demi Brigade, 1,099 men, six guns and three colors. On 22 June Suvorov halted pursuit by his army, exhausted by continuous marching and fighting. At first a division was allowed to follow the French, but this was soon reduced to an Austrian advanced guard under Johann von Klenau which went on to clear the Grand Duchy of Tuscany of enemy forces. On 20 June, Moreau and 14,000 French troops left the security of the mountains to defeat Count Heinrich von Bellegarde and 11,000 Austrians in the Second Battle of Marengo. Bellegarde withdrew to the west after suffering 2,260 casualties but Moreau soon scampered back to the safety of the Apennines after hearing news of the Trebbia. French casualties numbered 1,000 killed and wounded in this encounter.

By 27 June, Suvorov moved his main army west to cover the sieges of Alessandria and Tortona while Kray was still reducing Mantua. Suvorov and his Austrian chief of staff Johann Gabriel Chasteler de Courcelles planned to evict the weakened and battered French forces from Genoa and the Italian Riviera. However, instructions soon arrived from Vienna squelching any notion of offensive operations. Emperor Francis and his foreign minister Johann Amadeus Francis de Paula, Baron of Thugut insisted that the Italian fortresses must first be captured. In fact the emperor and Thugut were suspicious of Russian designs on Genoa and Tuscany, areas which they considered to be in Austria's sphere of influence. For his part, Suvorov was annoyed with Viennese officials for trying to direct the war from long distance.

Repeated military defeats shook the public's faith in the French Directory. The Coup of 30 Prairial VII occurred on 18 June which pushed Emmanuel-Joseph Sieyès and Paul Barras into leading roles and elevated Jean Baptiste Bernadotte to the post of Minister of War. There were two major forces in Italy, the 19,000-strong Army of the Alps under Jean Étienne Championnet and 40,713 men of the Army of Italy. The French government placed its hopes on Barthélemy Catherine Joubert to retrieve the situation as the new commander of the Army of Italy. Not only was Joubert a talented general, but he was believed to be lacking political ambitions and thus not a threat to the government. When Joubert arrived in the theater on 4 August, Moreau gracefully stepped aside and offered his assistance.

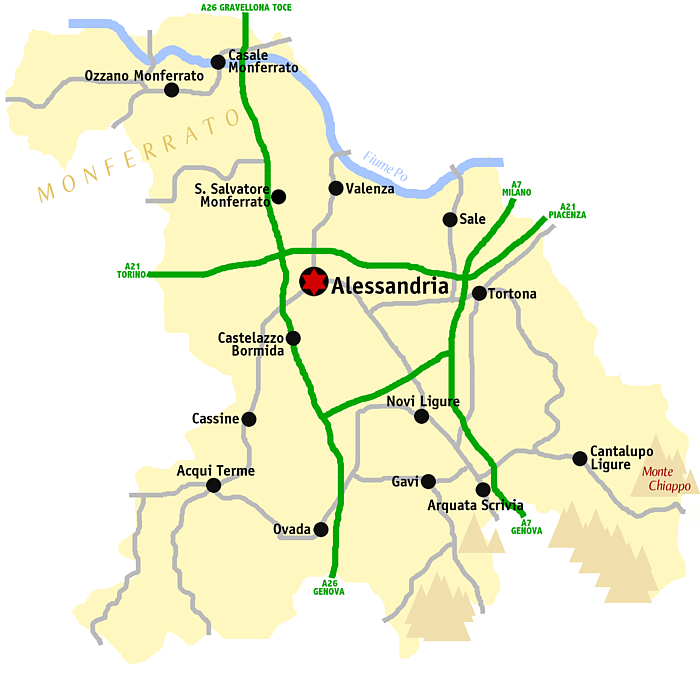
Modern map of Alessandria Province in Italy shows the locations of Novi Ligure, Alessandria, Tortona, Gavi and Acqui Terme.

The Allies successfully wrapped up the siege of Alessandria on 21 July and the Siege of Mantua on 30 July. These important events released 30,000 Coalition troops for field operations. Suvorov placed Konrad Valentin von Kaim with 14,000 Austrians to guard the west of Piedmont and Karl Joseph Hadik von Futak with 11,000 more to observe the alpine passes into Switzerland to the north. Klenau with 5,000 troops at Sarzana was watching the southeast side of Genoa. Kray was ordered to join the main army as quickly as possible. The rest of Suvorov's army was deployed in the area of Alessandria and Tortona. In the meantime, Chasteler was seriously wounded by a canister shot on 17 July during the siege of Alessandria and replaced by another Austrian, Anton von Zach. Despite the pain of his injury, Chasteler produced a new plan for ousting the French from the Ligurian mountains. This plan was put on indefinite hold when the news of the impending French offensive became known.

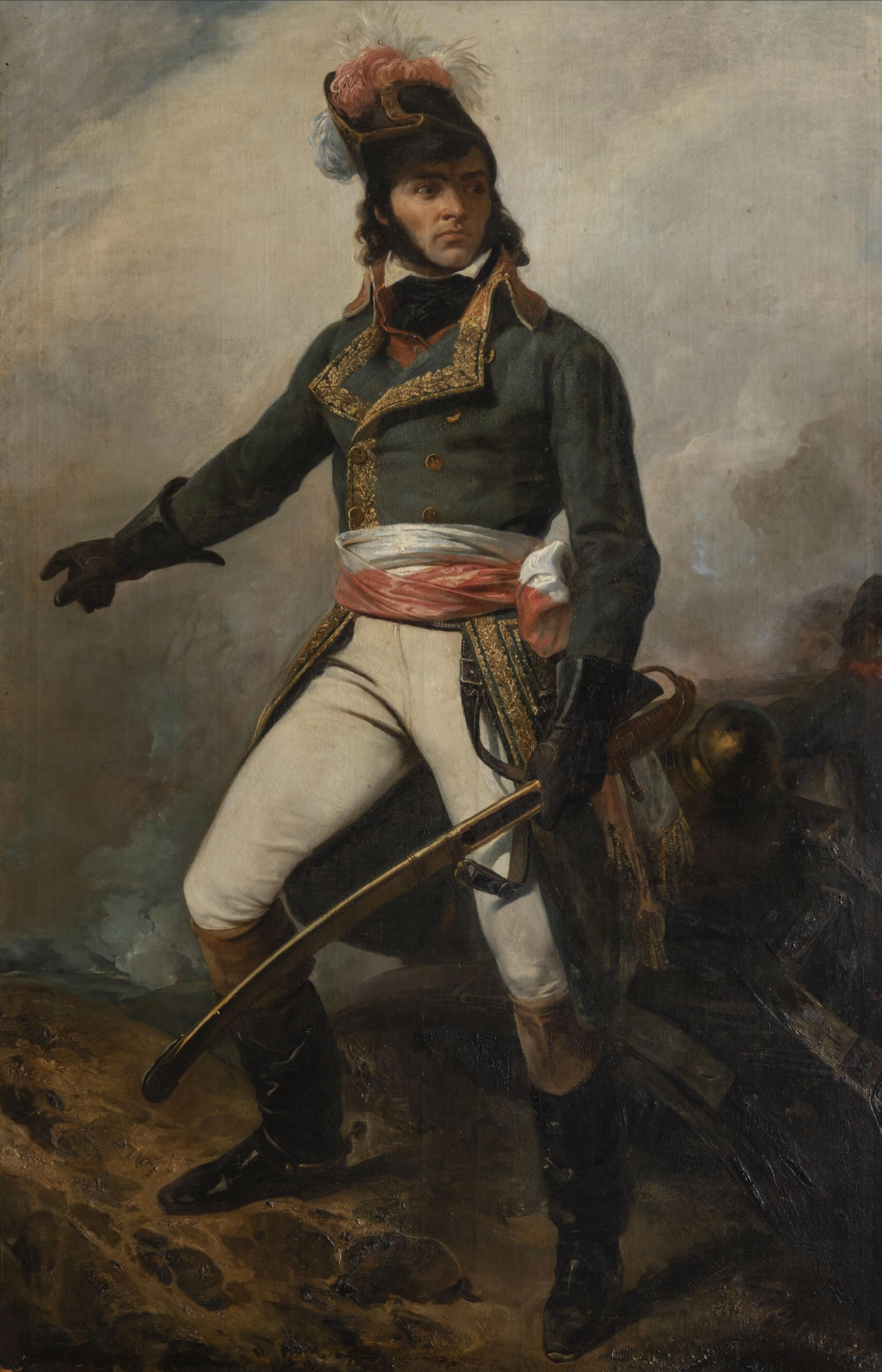
Barthélemy Joubert

The Army of Italy was fortunate in having capable generals. Catherine-Dominique de Pérignon led the left wing while Laurent Gouvion Saint-Cyr directed the right wing. Both became Marshals of France under Napoleon along with Joubert's chief of staff Louis Gabriel Suchet and division commander Emmanuel Grouchy. Joubert's generals wished to wait for Championnet's army to come up on their left around 20 August before advancing. However, Joubert believed that his orders to attack from the Directory were imperative and refused to delay. Saint-Cyr's wing moved north through the Bocchetta Pass and Gavi. At Serravalle Scrivia they besieged a castle held by four companies of Austrians. This position had been captured by Pyotr Bagration's 2,100-man Russian advance guard as recently as 9 August. Pérignon's wing had farther to march. This French column pushed some of Bellegarde's troops out of Terzo then swung east through Acqui Terme, Rivalta Bormida and Capriata d'Orba. Saint-Cyr arrived alone at Novi Ligure on 13 August, but Suvorov declined to attack, hoping to lure the French into the plains where his superior cavalry and artillery might prove decisive. That same day contact was established with Pérignon's approaching troops.

Kray's troops reached Alessandria on 12 June and Suvorov planned to launch them into an attack on Pérignon's wing early on the 14th. This proved to be impossible, but Kray managed to join Bellegarde's force and he promised to attack on 15 August. Meanwhile, the division of François Watrin moved down from the hills in the direction of Tortona, giving every indication that the French offensive was still in full swing. Joubert had hoped that he was facing only 8,000 enemies. But he was stunned to see that he was facing at least 36,000 enemies including Kray's corps in the plains below. Both Pérignon and Saint-Cyr counseled retreat, but Joubert put off a final decision until the next day. Meanwhile, Suvorov assumed that the French army would soon descend into the plains. When the French came forward, Kray and 27,000 soldiers would cut into their left flank while Bagration's 5,700-man Russian advance guard would turn their right flank. With luck the two forces would link hands behind the French. Once the turning movements were well developed, Wilhelm Derfelden's 9,850 Russians and Melas' 8,800 Austrians would join the battle. Farther north, Johann Baptist Alcaini's 5,260-strong force besieged Tortona, covered by Andrei Grigorevich Rosenberg's 8,270 Russians.

== Forces ==
=== Allied Army ===
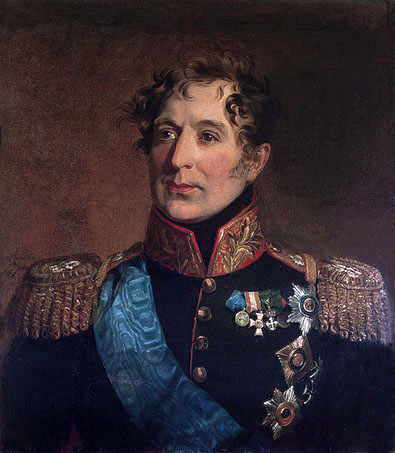
Mikhail Miloradovich

Kray's corps was divided into two Austrian divisions under Bellegarde and Peter Karl Ott von Bátorkéz. The brigade commanders were Friedrich Joseph Anton von Bellegarde, Friedrich Heinrich von Gottesheim, Ferdinand Minckwitz and Alexander Friedrich von Seckendorff. Except for the last-named, it is not clear in which division the brigadiers served. Ott's left division included three battalions each of the Deutschmeister Nr. 4, Terzy Nr. 16 and Mittrowsky Nr. 40 Infantry Regiments, two battalions of the Vukassovich Nr. 48 Infantry Regiment, one battalion of the Szluiner Grenz Infantry Regiment Nr. 4, and six squadrons of the Archduke John Dragoon Regiment Nr. 3. Ott commanded 9,979 infantry and 906 cavalry for a total of 10,885.

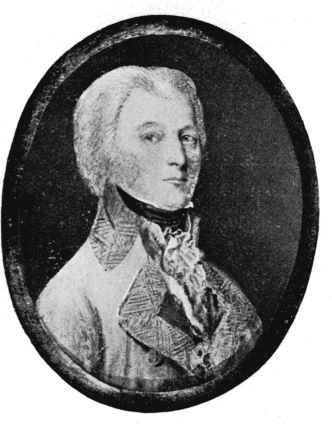
Baron Paul Kray

Bellegarde's division consisted of three battalions each of the Sztáray Nr. 33 and Nádasdy Nr. 39 Infantry Regiments, two battalions each of the Huff Nr. 8, Kheul Nr. 10, Gyulai Nr. 32 and Lattermann Nr. 45 Infantry Regiments, six squadrons of the Kaiser Dragoon Regiment Nr. 1 and eight squadrons of the Archduke Joseph Hussar Regiment Nr. 2. This force numbered 11,796 foot and 1,724 horse or a strength of 13,520 troops. To Bellegarde's right was a screening force under Seckendorff which was made up of two battalions of the Oranien Nr. 15 Infantry Regiment, one battalion of the Szluiner Grenz and three squadrons of the Hussar Regiment Nr. 5. The screening force counted 2,491 infantry and 524 cavalry or a total of 3,015 soldiers. Kray wielded a total of 27,420 troops in his large corps.

On the Allied left, Melas commanded Michael von Fröhlich's 8,575-strong Austrian division. The division consisted of more than 3,660 grenadiers in nine battalions, six squadrons each of the Lobkowitz Nr. 10 and Levenehr Nr. 14 Dragoon Regiments, 1,258 sabers, three battalions of the Fürstenberg Infantry Regiment Nr. 36, 2,081 men, and two battalions of the Stuart Infantry Regiment Nr. 18, 1,576 troops. One brigadier was Johann I Joseph, Prince of Liechtenstein, though the troops under his command are not given. Franz Joseph, Marquis de Lusignan led the Fürstenberg, Morzin, Paar, Pertusi and Weber Grenadier Battalions and Johann Ludwig Alexius von Loudon commanded the Hohenfeld, Goeschen, Schiaffinatti and Weissenwolff Grenadier Battalions. Anton Ferdinand Mittrowsky directed two of the Fürstenberg infantry battalions and two squadrons of the Lobkowitz Dragoons while Johann Benedikt Nobili led the two Stuart infantry battalions and two more squadrons of the Lobkowitz Regiment.

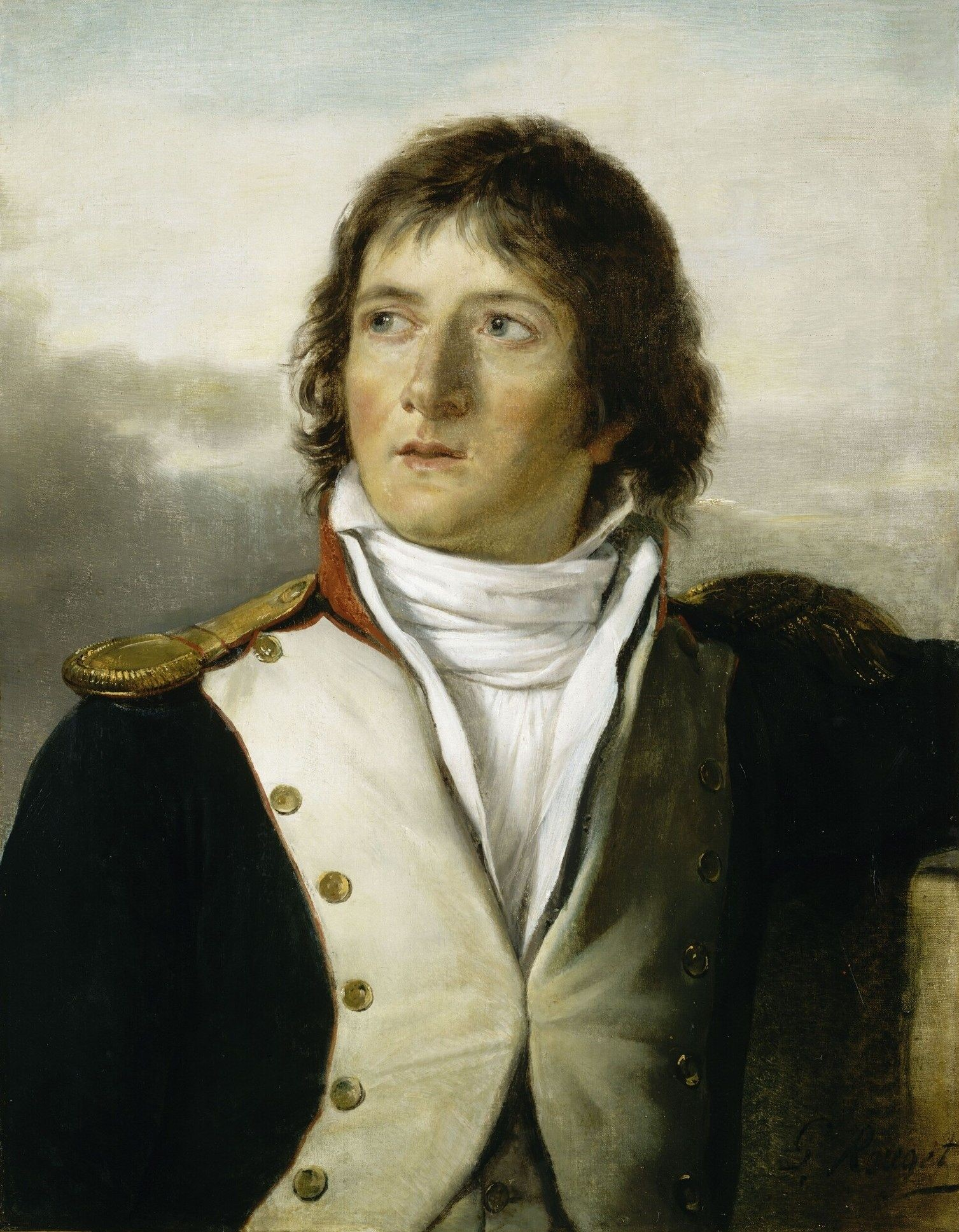
Laurent Saint-Cyr

Derfelden's 15,552-man Russian corps was divided into a division under Derfelden himself, a second division led by Mikhail Miloradovich and an Advance Guard led by Bagration. The Advance Guard consisted of two battalions each of the Bagration and Miller Jäger Regiments, 1,189 foot, the Dendrygin, Lomonosov, Sanaev and Kalemin Combined Grenadier Battalions, 1,728 foot, the Denisov, Sychov, Grekov and Semernikov Cossack Regiments, 1,948 horse, and six squadrons of the Austrian Karaczay Dragoon Regiment Nr. 4, 840 horse. Altogether, the 5,705-man Advance Guard counted 2,917 infantry and 2,788 cavalry. Derfelden's 6,127-strong infantry division included two battalions each of the Schveikovsky, Förster, Tyrtov and Baranovsky Musketeer Regiments and two battalions of the Rosenberg Grenadier Regiment. Miloradovich's 3,720-man infantry division had two battalions each of the Jung-Baden, Dalheim and Miloradovich Musketeer Regiments. The strength of Suvorov's Austro-Russian army was 44,347 foot and 7,200 horse, a total of 51,547 soldiers, not counting gunners and sappers.

=== French Army ===
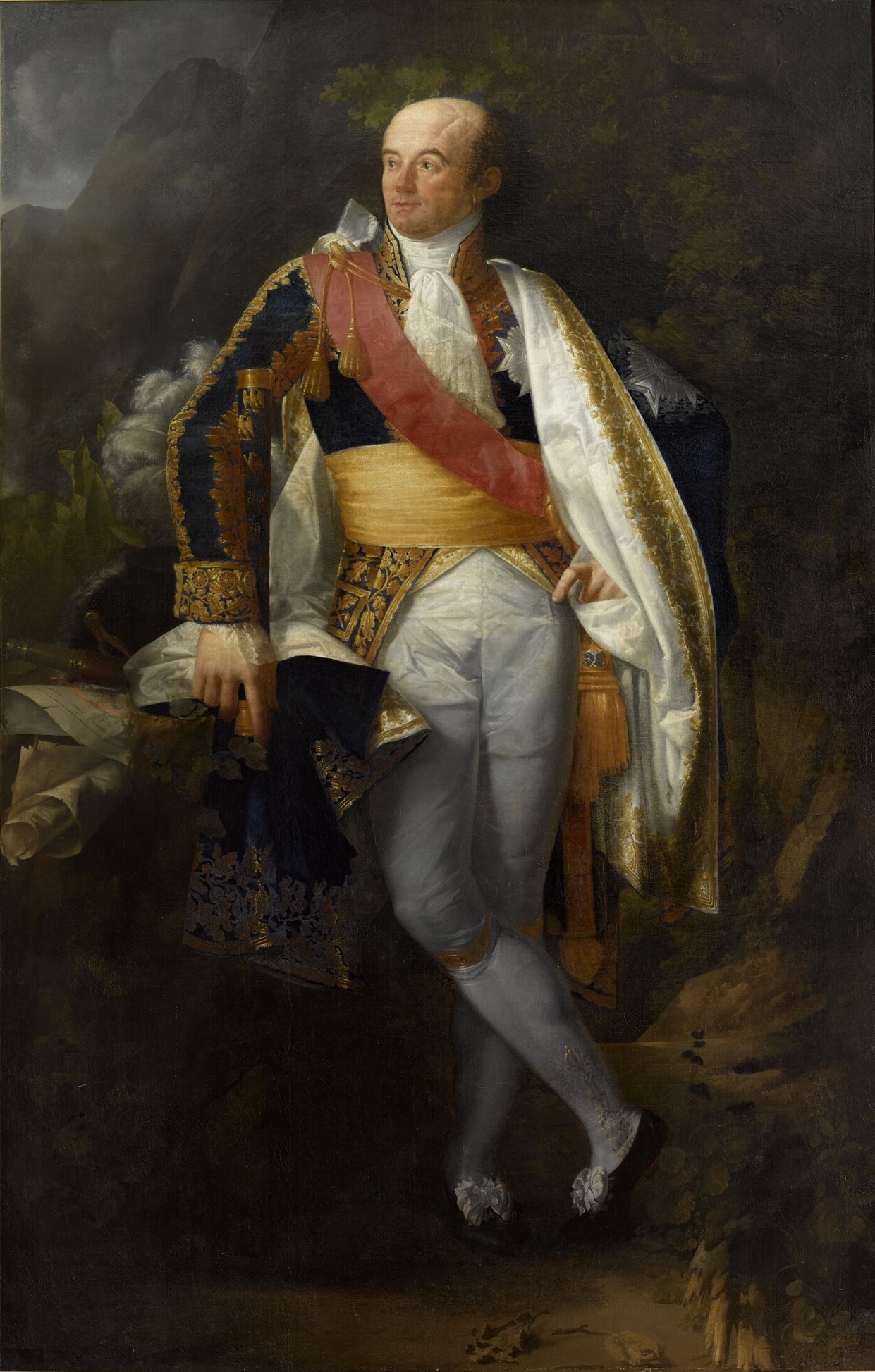
Dominique Pérignon

According to one authority Joubert's army numbered 32,843 infantry and 2,087 cavalry for a total of 34,930 men. Saint-Cyr stated the army was 34,000-strong but in another place gave a strength of 35,487 foot and 1,765 horse, or a total of 37,252 men not counting artillery. According to Spencer C. Tucker, the total French force amounted 35,000. The French supply arrangements had collapsed and the troops were tired, thirsty and starving. Some soldiers were reduced to eating grass and leaves. Pérignon's wing consisted of the infantry divisions of Grouchy and Louis Lemoine plus a two-brigade infantry reserve and Antoine Richepanse's cavalry reserve. All demi brigades had two battalions each except where otherwise noted. Grouchy's 5,620-man division had a first brigade under Charles Louis Dieudonné Grandjean made up of the 39th and 92nd Line Infantry Demi Brigades and one battalion of the 26th Light Infantry Demi Brigade. The second brigade of Henri François Marie Charpentier consisted of the 93rd and 99th Line Demi Brigades. Lemoine's 6,410-strong division included a first brigade under Louis Garreau with the 26th Line and 80th Line and one battalion of the 5th Light and a second brigade under Jean-Mathieu Seras counting the 20th Light and 34th Line. The three squadron strong 1st Hussar Regiment was attached to Lemoine. The 4,875-man reserve included Bertrand Clauzel's brigade with the 29th Light and 74th Line and Louis Partouneaux's brigade with the 105th Line and one battalion of the 26th Light. Richepanse commanded 1,002 sabers in the 2nd Chasseurs à Cheval, 12th Dragoon, and the 1st, 3rd and 18th Cavalry Regiments. Each regiment counted two squadrons.

Saint-Cyr's wing comprised the infantry divisions of Pierre Garnier de Laboissière, François Watrin and Jean Henri Dombrowski, a strong independent brigade under Louis Léonard Colli-Ricci, plus infantry and cavalry reserves. Laboissière's division numbered between 3,645 and 3,976 men in six battalions and had the three squadron strong 6th Hussar Regiment attached. François Jean Baptiste Quesnel's brigade included the 17th Light and 63rd Line Demi Brigades while Gaspard Amédée Gardanne's brigade counted the 18th Light and 21st Line Demi Brigades. Watrin's division had between 4,535 and 6,040 soldiers in 10 battalions including the attached 25th Chasseurs à Cheval of two squadron strength. André Calvin's advanced guard counted the 8th, 15th and 27th Light and 2nd Line, Antoine Arnaud's brigade consisted of the 12th and 30th Light and Pierre Étienne Petitot's brigade had the 62nd and 78th Line. Dombrowski's division counted between 2,130 and 2,340 troops in seven battalions. Dombrowski's units were the 17th and 55th Line, the Polish Legion including a cavalry squadron and two battalions of the 1st (Italian) Cisalpine. Colli commanded from 3,878 to 4,260 men consisting of two battalions each of the 14th, 24th and 68th Line plus a battalion of Poles. The infantry reserve had 2,420 soldiers in four battalions of the 3rd and 106th Line. François Guérin d'Etoquigny's cavalry reserve numbered 425 sabers in five squadrons of the 16th and 19th Dragoons and 19th Chasseurs à Cheval.

== Battle ==
=== Kray attacks ===
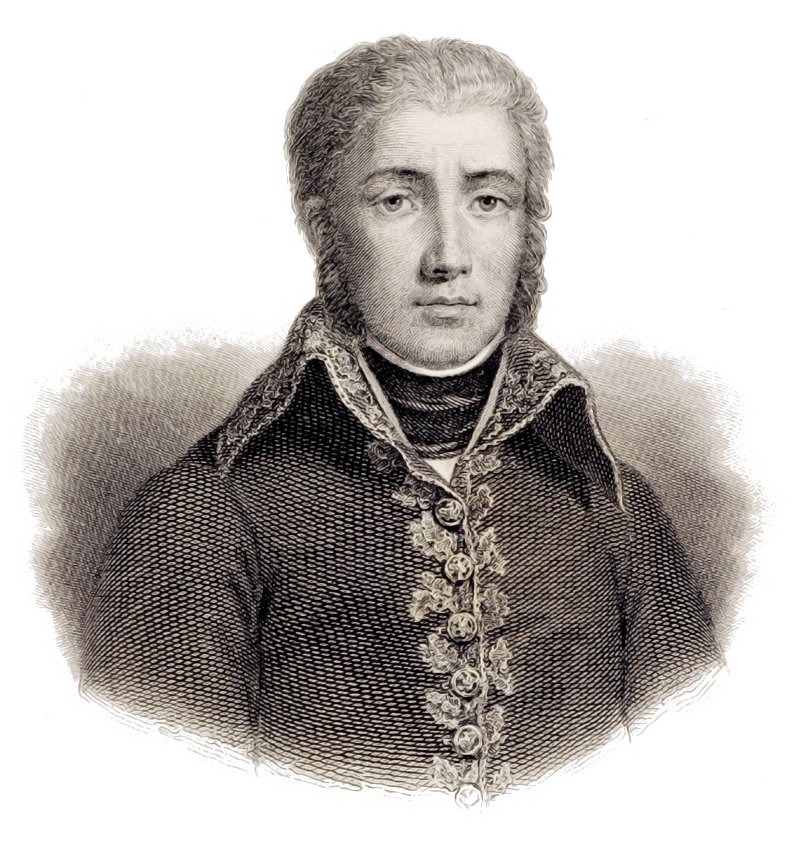
Jean Victor Moreau

Joubert did not plan on fighting at Novi Ligure, but the position that his troops held was well-suited for a defensive battle. Facing north, the French held an arc of high ground from Serravalle on the right to Pasturana on the left. In the center, Novi was surrounded by a wall and ditch dating to the Middle Ages. One weakness of the position was that the deep ravines of the Riasco and Braghena streams cut across the rear, obstructing any retreat. Kray had the Allied right wing in movement before dawn with Bellegarde on the right and Ott on the left. Seckendorf on the far right aimed for the place where the Riasco stream emerged from its ravine. The crackle of muskets began at 3:20 am as the Austrian columns bumped into French picket lines. This provoked a great racket in the French camps as their surprised troops rushed into formation. At first light, the Allies saw that the heights were crowned by the blue lines of French infantry. Instead of striking the flank of an enemy army on the move, the Austrians of the right wing were making a frontal attack on a strong position.

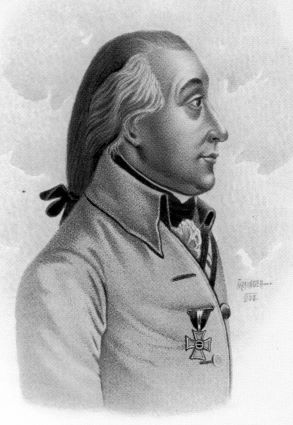
Peter Karl Ott

On the extreme French right, Dombrowski's division blockaded the Austrians in Serravalle Castle. Next in line was Watrin's division which was still deployed in the low ground to the east of Novi. Gardanne's brigade held Novi while the rest of Laboissière's division lined the heights behind the town. Farther to the left was Lemoine's division and then Grouchy's division on the far left. The left was braced by the reserves of Clauzel, Partouneaux and Richepanse.

At the foot of the plateau, Ott and Bellegarde deployed from marching columns into lines. At first their assault enjoyed some success against their sleep-groggy opponents. However, the slopes were steep and obstructed by vineyards, forcing the Austrians to redeploy into column. Pérignon brought Clauzel and Partouneaux to the assistance of Grouchy, while Saint-Cyr sent Colli's brigade from the right wing to help Lemoine. Moreau took charge of the French center in the contest against Ott. In this phase of the battle Joubert was fatally hit while leading a counterattack by the 26th Light Demi Brigade. Despite mounting losses, the Austrian infantry bravely and repeatedly struggled forward in columns. As they reached the top of the slope and tried to redeploy into line, they were struck by French counterattacks and forced back. At last, Ott's columns were overthrown by the 26th Light and 105th Line and Kray's entire wing fell back to the bottom of the heights to reform.

By 9:00 am Kray and his officers managed to reorganize their troops when an order arrived from Suvorov to renew the attack. Once more the Austrians attacked the heights and once more they were defeated with loss. While Clauzel and Richepanse helped repulse Bellegarde's division, Partouneaux counterattacked Ott. Encouraged by his success, Partouneaux unwisely charged down into the plain where his troops were scattered by four squadrons of the Archduke Joseph Hussars and Kaiser Dragoons. Partouneaux was among those captured. After the repulse of his second attack, Kray massed a 40-gun battery with which he bombarded any French troops who dared to line the crest. But the Austrian general refused to launch more attacks until the rest of the army joined the fight. Suvorov had planned to encircle a French army in motion. The unexpected circumstances threw the Allied plan out of gear.

=== Bagration and Miloradovich in battle ===
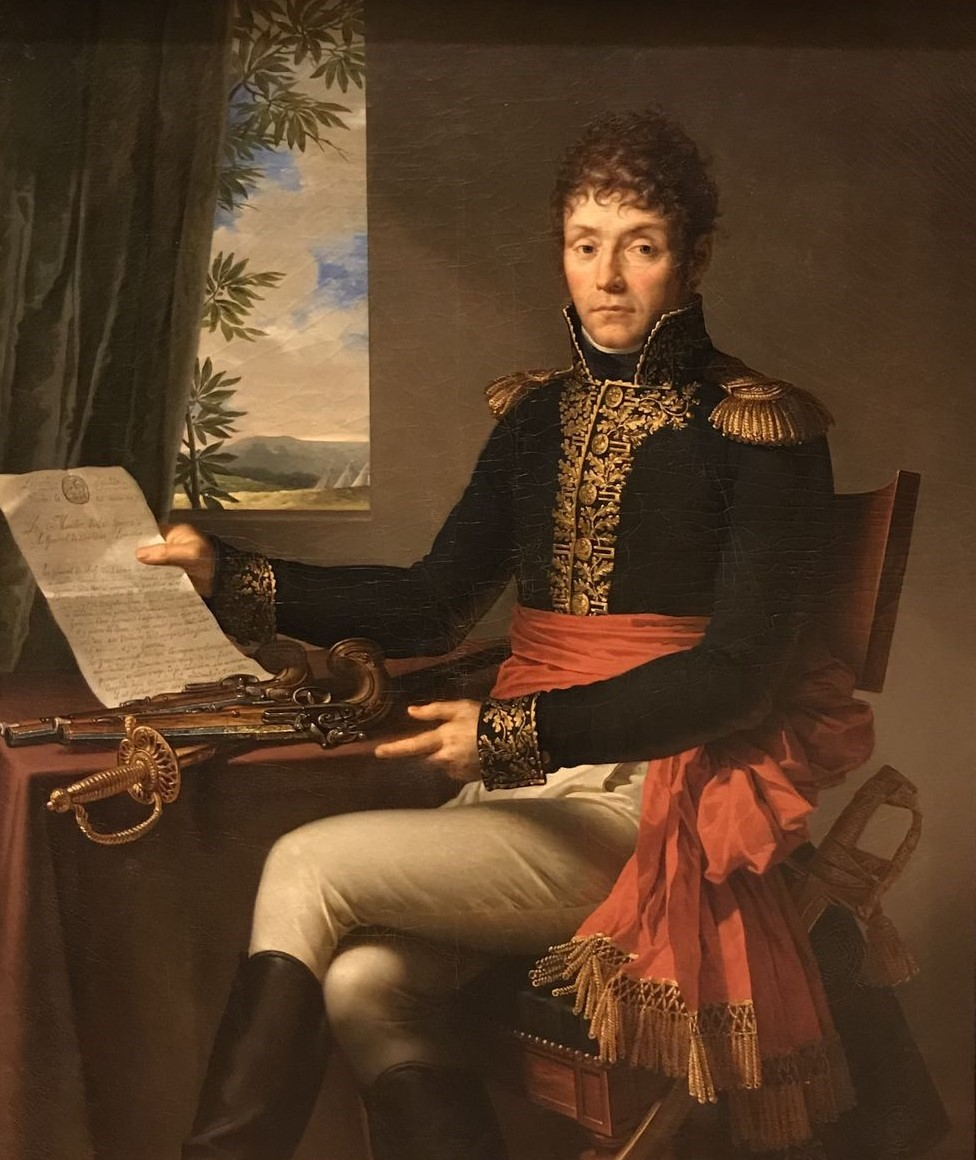
Louis Lemoine

Suvorov realized that every man must be thrown into the battle. Bagration's command belatedly attacked Novi at 10:00 am. As the Russians moved forward they were subjected to an intense artillery barrage. Bagration's troops were able to press back the French skirmish lines through the outlying ditches, gardens and suburbs of Novi, but were foiled when they encountered Novi's city wall. Moving to their right, they were easy marks for the tirailleurs who were concealed in the vineyards and farm buildings. The Russians ran into Quesnel's brigade of Laboissière's division defending the heights; it held back the Russians. As the Russians pushed forward, they were attacked in flank by Gardanne's men from Novi and even by Watrin's division from the French right flank, which was eager to gain its revenge for the defeat on the Trebbia. Most of Miloradovich's division was sent into the fray to assist Bagration (Ivan Förster was appointed commander of Miloradovich's dispatched force): the Miller Jaeger and the Lomonosov and Sanaev grenadiers succeeded in containing Gardanne's thrusts from Novi, but every Russian assault on the French center came to grief. Bagration's Cossacks found employment by luring French skirmishers into the plain and then killing or capturing them.

=== Melas' movement ===
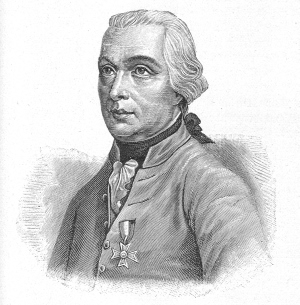
Michael von Melas

In due course, Derfelden's division arrived at the front and was hurled into a new attack near Novi. Kray's wing attacked once more and his attack stalled. Around 11:30 am Suvorov directed the Allied left wing under Melas to advance. However, Melas, shortly after Derfelden left, declined to attack Novi as ordered by Suvorov's sent adjutant Colonel Lavrov. Instead of a full-fledged frontal attack on the right of the Novi position, he carefully reconnoitered the ground and also decided to head out east of this strong position—on the distant right flank. The Austrian sent Nobili's two battalions and two squadrons south along the east bank of the Scrivia River toward the Serravalle Castle to prevent any French threat from that direction. Nobili was aided by Lieutenant Colonel Dworschak and the garrison of Serravalle Castle, which made a sortie into the town. The remainder of the left wing, the main force, moved down the west bank of the river with Mittrowsky's brigade on the left and the grenadier battalions on the right, to help the Russians against Watrin as directed; Melas would instruct Lusignan's brigade to attack to the east of Novi in conjunction with Derfelden, while Loudon's brigade made a wider sweep eastwards toward the heights with Mittrowsky. Loudon and Mittrowsky headed that way due to pressure from the Austro-Russian commander in chief, who directed them to be moved from the east bank, thus only Nobili's brigade remained there, going to Serravalle. At the same time Melas himself with Lusignan's brigade and Liechtenstein's cavalry joined the Russian left flank. Melas was criticized for his rather slow progress, although Suvorov reported to Francis II that Melas' column "moved forward with the speed of an arrow."

Around 3:00 pm the most recent Austro-Russian attack was repulsed from the line of heights. According to Gryazev's chronicles, Rosenberg Grenadiers advanced half way up the slopes, but recoiled in the face of a fire at point blank range. They were saved from destruction by Suvorov, who ordered them to veer to the right, and then fall back downhill. By this time Watrin had positioned his division on the heights to the east of Novi. Lusignan's grenadiers made three frontal attacks on Watrin without breaking through. Meanwhile, Loudon's grenadiers approached Watrin's right flank and Mittrowsky's command threatened an even deeper envelopment. In the face of the new attacks, Watrin's division crumbled. Saint-Cyr threw the 106th Line Demi Brigade into a counterattack which stopped the Austrians and captured Lusignan, who was wounded. By 5:00 pm, Watrin and the 106th were finally beaten by superior numbers and retreated. On the opposite flank Kray attacked again between 3:00 and 4:00 pm.

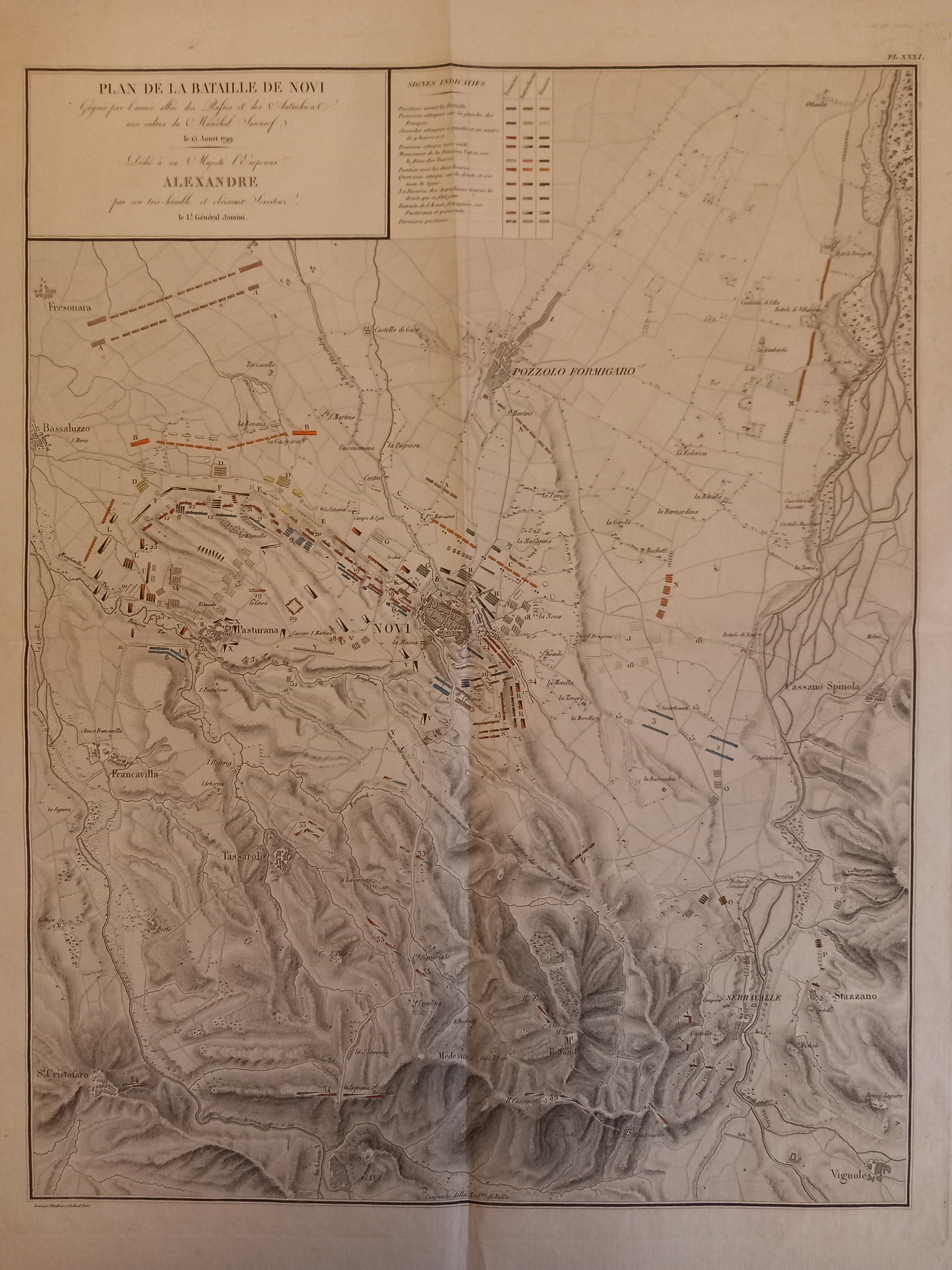
Plan of the battle of Novi by Antoine-Henri Jomini

=== Coalition breakthrough ===
Around 5:30 pm the entire French position started to disintegrate. The Paar Grenadier Battalion drove Colli's 68th Line from the crest near Novi. The troops of Derfelden and Melas broke into Novi at about the same time, driving out most of Gardanne's men. Laboissière's division managed to follow Watrin's men in their escape. But at about this time the French army split into two halves which were not reunited until three days later. As the French left started to pull back, the Allies closed in for the kill, unleashing their cavalry. Earlier, Bellegarde had posted a battalion and four squadrons near Pasturana on the far right. Now, as the French retreated they had to negotiate the streets of Pasturana, the Braghena Gorge immediately to the south and Bellegarde's small force.

The entire French left wing had to squeeze through the blockage. The Russians took no prisoners, killing every Frenchman that they caught. If a French soldier survived as a prisoner, it was because he was taken by Kray's Austrians. In the melee Grouchy tried to rally his men but was cut down and captured. Pérignon was also taken prisoner after suffering three wounds including a deep saber cut above his left eye. Colli and at least 2,000 other French soldiers and 21 artillery pieces were captured, mostly in the bottleneck at Pasturana. As night fell, the French army streamed away and the exhausted Allies stopped. Near midnight, some of Gardanne's men were discovered hiding out in Novi and the Russians went through the town again. Having accomplished their purpose, they began looting and Suvorov ordered his drummers to beat assembly to stop the pillage.

== Results ==
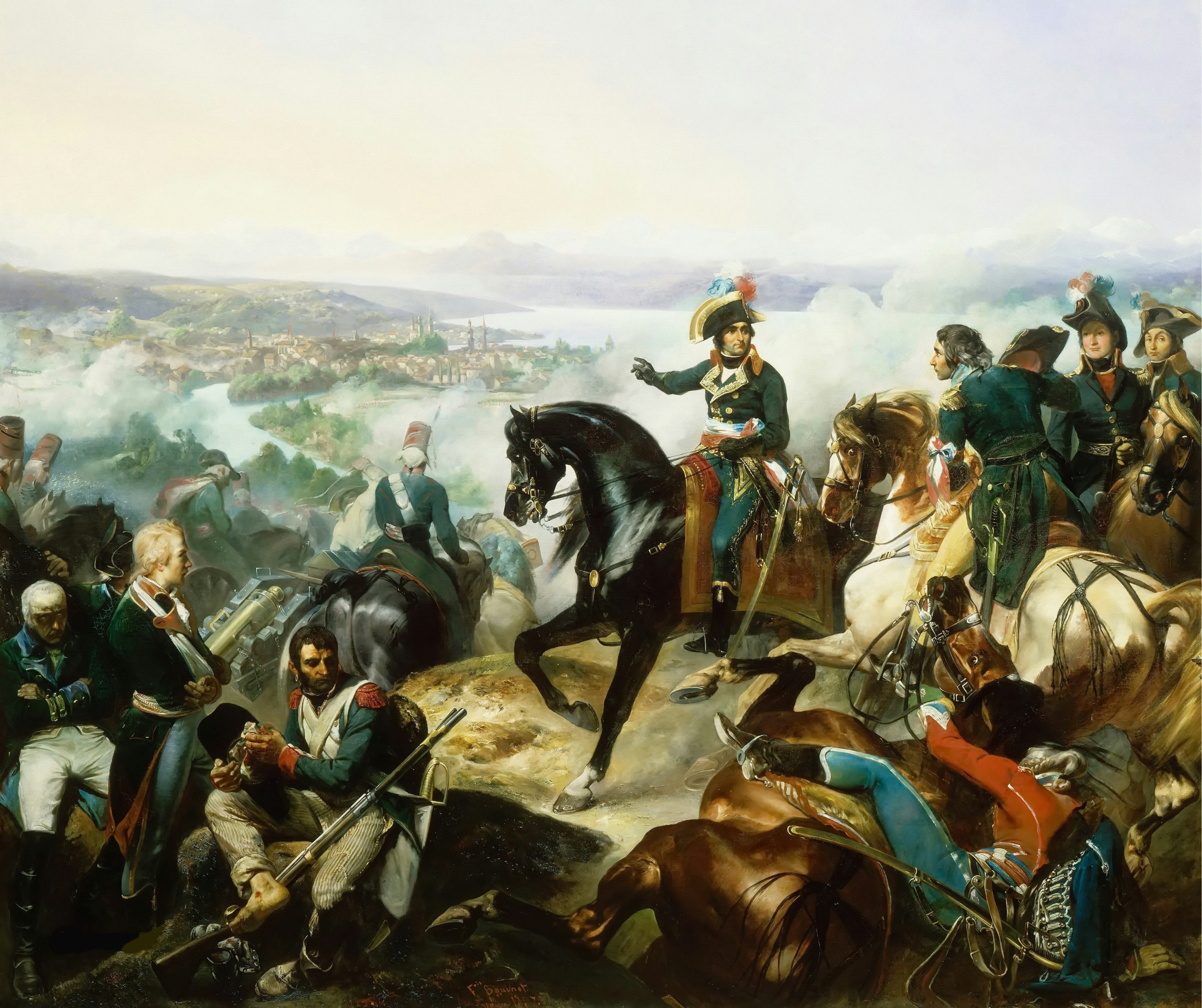
The Battle of Zurich by François Bouchot, 1835. André Masséna's victory at Zurich ruined the new Allied strategy.

Years later when Moreau was asked about Suvorov, he replied:

"What can you say of a general so resolute to a superhuman degree, and who would perish himself and let his army perish to the last man rather than retreat a single pace."

Suvorov sent a summary letter (22 August [O.S. 11 August] 1799) regarding the French defensive position, strength, total losses (including retreat) and the results of the battle, where, with elements of his usual eccentricity, Suvorov addresses to Admiral Fyodor Ushakov, who was campaigning on the Mediterranean at that time. It contained:

"My merciful sovereign, Fyodor Fyodorovich!
I hasten to inform Your Excellency of the severe defeat of the enemy. On the 4/15 of this month he appeared on the mountains' ridges near Novi, consisting of 37,000 mans, (Note: Russian: состоявшей в 37 000 человеках) and drew up in battle order, having Gavi behind him on the left, and with his right wing extending to Serravalle. In this position he was attacked, completely broken and put to flight. His damage amount, according to the admission of the French themselves, to 20,000 men. More than 6,000 men were killed on the spot, including General Joubert, who commanded the army, General of Division Vatrant (Note: The sources do not claim a captured general of division with this or a similar last name, f.e., Watrin. Probably, Suvorov confused him with someone else, as he once did with Lecourbe and Lacour (see Battle of Muottental § 1 October), or he simply got false information.) and Bri[gade] G[eneral] Garreau; 4 generals were taken prisoner: General-in-Chief Pérignon, divisional generals Grouchy and Colli; Brigadier General Partouneaux, and the staff, senior officers, and privates about 5,000; over 4,000 men scattered; 39 guns were beaten off, 48 boxes of gutpowder, (Note: Russian: с потрохом ящиков 48)

— I will forever remain with the utmost respect, my merciful sovereign, Your Excellency's most humble servant."

Historian Digby Smith called Novi, "one of the bloodiest battles of the era" and the casualties bear this out. Smith claimed that the Allies sustained about 900 killed, 4,200 wounded and 1,400 captured or missing (6,500 totally), plus three guns. Russian generals Gorchakov, Tyrtov and Chubarov were wounded. The French lost 1,500 killed, 5,500 wounded and 4,500 prisoners — 11,500 totally. The Allies also captured 37 guns, 40 munition wagons and eight colors. Christopher Duffy stated that one Austrian account admitted a sum of 799 killed, 3,670 wounded and 1,259 missing, though this adds up to less than the 5,754 reported total. Kray's wing alone had 710 killed, 3,260 wounded and 1,175 missing. The Russians suffered 2,496 casualties. The two sets of figures add up to a total Allied loss of 8,250. Duffy gave French losses as 6,500 to 6,643; evidently this is only the killed and wounded. Statistician Gaston Bodart noticed 11,000 Frenchmen out of 35,000 and 9,000 allies out of 50,000. Gunther E. Rothenberg asserted that both sides lost 7,000 killed and wounded, while the Allies had 2,000 missing or prisoners and the French had 4,000 prisoners or missing plus 37 guns. David G. Chandler rounded the casualties to 8,000 Allied and 11,000 French. According to Spencer C. Tucker, 11,000 were killed on the French side, and 9,000 on the Allied side. Micheal Clodfelter estimated Allied losses at 8,750, of which 6,050 Austrians were lost including captured, and the Russians lost 2,700 men. The French losses Clodfelter assessed at 9,663, of which 6,663 men were KIA and WIA, and about 3,000 were taken captive. 37 guns were lost. According to David Eggenberger, the Coalition lost 8,000 men in the attack, while the French lost 11,000. According to Aleksandr Bogolyubov, Coalition losses amounted to 8,000 men, and French casualties, including those soldiers who fled after the battle, totaled 16,000 and all the wagons. According to another version, — Orlov's, — together with the dispersed, the losses amounted to only 15,100, but it is based on the assumptions of some, as stated by the author; by the same estimate 6,500 were killed or wounded and 4,600 captured (11,100 totally). According to Ivan Rostunov, general irretrievable and sanitary losses of the French reached 20,000 soldiers and officers, in accordance with Suvorov's statement (also including the retreat that followed; i.e. those who deserted, stragglers, died under various circumstances, taken prisoner, battle-wounded and sick who were hospitalized, etc.).

Bagration was awarded the Order of Alexander Nevsky while Derfelden earned the Order of St. Andrew.

Once the soldiers of the French left wing got clear of the Braghena Gorge, they quickly left the battlefield far behind. The right wing, however, was in a difficult spot because it was unable to withdraw through Gavi and Nobili's command blocked its escape route via Arquata Scrivia. Saint-Cyr was unable to dislodge the Austrians with Dombrowski's men and finally shoved Nobili out of the way by using Watrin's division. Suvorov brought up Rosenberg's corps to the battlefield but did not launch a pursuit. The Russian commander in chief still planned to evict the French from Genoa and the Italian Riviera, but orders soon arrived sending troops elsewhere. Klenau's command to the southeast of Genoa was diverted to secure Austrian control of Tuscany. A French offensive seized Valais in southwest Switzerland, routing some of Hadik's troops. Suvorov detached Kray to the north with 10,000 Austrians to help.

On 25 August, Suvorov's hopes to conquer Liguria were dashed forever when fresh instructions from Emperor Francis reached him. A new strategy put forward by the British and approved by Czar Paul and the Austrians directed Suvorov to take command of a new Russian army assembling in Switzerland. This army would be formed by joining the Russian troops in Italy to another Russian army in Germany under Alexander Korsakov. The army was to invade France through the Jura Mountains. When Korsakov arrived in Switzerland, Archduke Charles, Duke of Teschen immediately moved north into Germany with the main Austrian army. The strategy's timing failed. Charles left Switzerland too early and Suvorov reached Switzerland too late. André Masséna wrecked the Allied plan when he defeated Korsakov at the Second Battle of Zurich on 26 September 1799.

== See also ==
- Capture of Brescia
- Battle of Cassano
- Battle of Bassignana
- First Battle of Marengo
- Battle of Modena
- Battle of the Trebbia
- Second Battle of Marengo
- Battle of the Gotthard Pass
- Battle of the Klöntal
- Battle of the Muotatal

== Sources ==
- Chandler, David G. (1979). Dictionary of the Napoleonic Wars. New York, N.Y.: Macmillan. ISBN 0-02-523670-9.
- Clausewitz, Carl von (2020). Napoleon Absent, Coalition Ascendant: The 1799 Campaign in Italy and Switzerland. Vol. 1. Translated by Murray, Nicholas; Pringle, Christopher. Lawrence, Kansas: University Press of Kansas. ISBN 978-0-7006-3025-7.
- Clodfelter, M. (2017). Warfare and Armed Conflicts: A Statistical Encyclopedia of Casualty and Other Figures, 1492-2015 (4th ed.). Jefferson, North Carolina: McFarland. ISBN 978-0-7864-7470-7.
- Duffy, Christopher (1999). Eagles Over the Alps: Suvorov in Italy and Switzerland, 1799. Chicago, Ill.: The Emperor's Press. ISBN 1-883476-18-6.
- Rothenberg, Gunther E. (1980). The Art of War in the Age of Napoleon. Bloomington, Ind.: Indiana University Press. ISBN 0-253-31076-8.
- Smith, Digby (1998). The Napoleonic Wars Data Book. London: Greenhill. ISBN 1-85367-276-9.
- Tucker, Spencer C. (2009). A Global Chronology of Conflict: From the Ancient World to the Modern Middle East [6 volumes]: From the Ancient World to the Modern Middle East. ABC-CLIO. ISBN 978-1851096725.
- Eggenberger, David (1985). An Encyclopedia of Battles. New York: Dover Publications. ISBN 0-486-24913-1.
- Latimer, Jon (December 1999). "War of the Second Coalition". Military History: 62–69.
- Bodart, Gaston (1908). Militär-historisches Kriegs-Lexikon (1618–1905) (in German). Vienna and Leipzig: C. W. Stern.
- Orlov, Nikolay Aleksandrovich (1892). Разбор военных действий Суворова в Италии в 1799 году [Analysis of Suvorov's military actions in Italy in 1799] (PDF) (in Russian). St. Petersburg: Тип. Тренке и Фюсно. ISBN 9785998994289.
- Rostunov, Ivan I. (1989). Генералиссимус Александр Васильевич Суворов: Жизнь и полководческая деятельность [Generalissimo Alexander Suvorov: Life and military activity] (in Russian). Moscow: Voenizdat. ISBN 5-203-00046-8.
- Bogolyubov, Aleksandr N. (1939). Полководческое искусство А.В. Суворова [The art of military leadership of A.V. Suvorov] (in Russian). Moscow: Voenizdat. ISBN 978-5-4484-0277-7.
- Arsenyev, Konstantin; Petrushevsky, Fyodor (1897). Brockhaus and Efron Encyclopedic Dictionary (in Russian). Vol. XXI. Нибелунги — Нэффцер. Friedrich A. Brockhaus (Leipzig), Ilya A. Efron (St. Petersburg).
- Milyutin, Dmitry (1852). История войны России с Францией в царствование Императора Павла I в 1799 году [The history of Russia's war with France during the reign of Emperor Paul I in 1799] (in Russian). Vol. III. St. Petersburg: Типография штаба военно-учебных заведений.
- Velichko, Konstantin; Novitsky, Vasily; Schwarz, Aleksey von; Apushkin, Vladimir; Schulz, Gustav von (1914). Sytin Military Encyclopedia (in Russian). Vol. XVII. Нитроглицерин — Патруль. Тип. Т-ва И. Д. Сытина.
- Egorshina, O.; Petrova, A. (2023). История русской армии [The history of the Russian Army] (in Russian). Moscow: Edition of the Russian Imperial Library. ISBN 978-5-699-42397-2.

Preceded by Battle of Cascina Grossa	French Revolution: Revolutionary campaigns Battle of Novi (1799)	Succeeded by Battle of Krabbendam
