= Battle of Modena (1799) =

1799 battle during the War of the Second Coalition

- Part of Suvorov's Italian campaign during the War of the Second Coalition
Date	12 June 1799
Location	Modena, Italy 44°39′N 10°56′E
Result	French victory

Belligerents
France	(Habsburg monarchy) Habsburg Austria

Commanders and leaders
(France) Jacques MacDonald (WIA)	(Habsburg monarchy) Prince Hohenzollern

Strength
29,000	4,300

Casualties and losses
600	2,400, 8 guns

War of the Second Coalition:
Italy
current battle
Napoleon in command
Napoleon not in command

The Battle of Modena was fought on 12 June 1799 during the War of the Second Coalition, pitting a Republican French army commanded by General Jacques MacDonald against a Habsburg Austrian covering force under Prince Hohenzollern. Marching north from central Italy to relieve pressure on Allied-occupied Lombardy, MacDonald's divisions attacked Hohenzollern's outnumbered force near Modena, forcing the Austrians to retreat with heavy casualties. Although the French secured a clear tactical victory, MacDonald was wounded in a cavalry clash during the engagement, and his army subsequently moved west toward its next major clash at the Battle of the Trebbia.

In the battles of Magnano and Cassano, the Austrians and allied Russian Empire forces swept the French from much of northern Italy in April 1799. MacDonald collected the French occupying forces in south and central Italy into an army and marched north to retrieve the situation. Bursting out of the Apennine Mountains, the French divisions of Jean-Baptiste Olivier and François Watrin mauled Hohenzollern's division at Modena. MacDonald swung west to fight the Coalition forces. The next action would be the Battle of the Trebbia (1799) from 17 to 19 June.

== See also ==
- Capture of Brescia
- Battle of Cassano
- Battle of Bassignana
- First Battle of Marengo
- Battle of the Trebbia
- Second Battle of Marengo
- Battle of Novi
