= Battle of Bassignana (1799) =

1799 battle of the Second Coalition war

- Part of Suvorov's Italian campaign during the war of the Second Coalition
| Date | 12 May 1799 |
| Location | Bassignana, present-day Italy 45°0′8″N 8°43′55″E |
| Result | French victory |

Belligerents
| (French First Republic) France: • Helvetic Republic | Russian Empire (Holy Roman Empire) Habsburg Empire |

Commanders and leaders
| (French First Republic) Jean Moreau (French First Republic) Paul Grenier (French First Republic) Claude-Victor Perrin | (Russian Empire) Grand Duke Constantine (Russian Empire) Andrei Rosenberg (Russian Empire) Nikolay Chubarov (WIA) (Holy Roman Empire) Andreas Karaczay |

Strength
| (French First Republic) (Helvetic Republic) 12,000 (Note: For more details, see the forces section.) | 3,500–7,000 (Note: For more details, see the forces section.) |

Casualties and losses
| 617 | 992–2,000; 2–4 guns |

War of the Second Coalition:
Italy
current battle
Napoleon in command
Napoleon not in command

The Battle of Bassignana (12 May 1799) saw a Russian corps led by Andrei Grigorevich Rosenberg, who was under the influence of Grand Duke Constantine, attempt to establish a bridgehead on the south bank of the Po River in the presence of a French army under Jean Victor Marie Moreau. The French rapidly massed superior strength and attacked. After several hours of hard fighting, the Russians abandoned their foothold with serious losses. This War of the Second Coalition action occurred near the town of Bassignana, located in the angle between the Po and Tanaro Rivers, about 19 kilometres (12 mi) northeast of Alessandria, Italy.

A string of Austrian and Russian victories in the spring of 1799 evicted the French armies from north and northeast Italy. The leader of the combined Austro-Russian armies, Alexander Suvorov prepared to drive the French armies from the rest of Italy. Suvorov ordered his lieutenant Rosenberg to join him on the south bank of the Po below its confluence with the Tanaro. Probably overruled by the Tsar's son Grand Duke Constantine Pavlovich of Russia, Rosenberg unwisely crossed above the confluence with the Tanaro. Two of Moreau's divisions under Paul Grenier and Claude Victor-Perrin soon counterattacked and defeated the Russians. The Bassignana action was only a minor setback for the Allies. A few days later, Moreau launched a reconnaissance that resulted in the First Battle of Marengo.

== Background ==
The beginning of the 1799 campaign saw the drawn Battle of Verona on 26 March between the Austrian army of Paul Kray and the French Army of Italy under Barthélemy Louis Joseph Schérer. On 5 April, Kray with 46,000 troops defeated Schérer with 40,600 men in the Battle of Magnano. The Austrians sustained losses of 4,000 killed and wounded plus 2,000 captured. The French lost 3,500 killed and wounded plus 18 guns, seven colors, and 4,500 men captured. The badly shaken Schérer added 6,600 men to the garrison of Mantua and began to retreat. The Siege of Mantua lasted until the end of July, but other smaller garrisons that Schérer left behind were quickly forced to surrender. After subtracting garrisons and battle losses, the Army of Italy had only 28,000 available. From the army commander down to the rank and file, the French were utterly demoralized. To make matters worse for the French, Alexander Suvorov arrived with 24,551 Russian soldiers and assumed command of the combined Austro-Russian army.

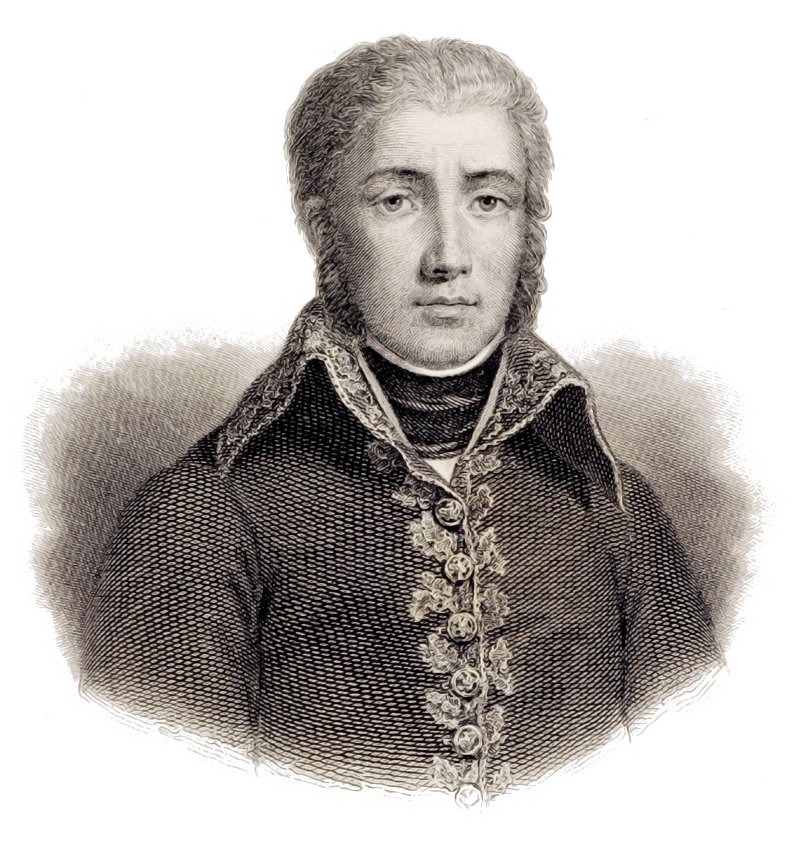
Jean Victor Moreau

Schérer's resignation was accepted by the French government and he handed over command of the army to Jean Victor Marie Moreau on 26 April 1799. The next day, Suvorov attacked and won the Battle of Cassano. Moreau admitted sustaining 2,542 casualties and was compelled to retreat. Jean-Mathieu-Philibert Sérurier and 2,400 men of his division were cut off and compelled to surrender that evening. Moreau with Paul Grenier's division retreated west all the way to Turin, then crossed to the south bank of the Po River and marched east again. Claude Perrin Victor's division crossed the Po at Casale Monferrato and took position near the fortress city of Alessandria. When Grenier joined Victor there on 7 May, Moreau had a field army of 20,000 troops. Its right flank was buttressed by Alessandria while its left flank was at Valenza.

On 6 May 1799, Suvorov's left wing crossed the Po at Piacenza and moved southwest toward Bobbio, while his main body crossed farther west. On 7 May, a 13,865-man Austrian corps was at Castel San Giovanni while Pyotr Bagration with the 5,862-man Russian advance guard was at Voghera, both on the south bank of the Po. Rosenberg with 10,571 soldiers was at Dorno with a 3,075-strong advance guard at Lomello, both on the north bank. Josef Philipp Vukassovich and 5,100 Austrians were farther west, also on the north bank. That same day Grand Duke Constantine arrived with the army, thirsting for action. On 9 May, Suvorov's chief of staff, the Austrian Johann Gabriel Chasteler de Courcelles and two battalions chased the French out of the town of Tortona, though not its citadel. Desiring to concentrate his army on the south bank, Suvorov issued orders to Rosenberg to cross the Po at Alluvioni Cambiò - that is, downstream from the confluence of the Po and Tanaro rivers.

== Battle ==
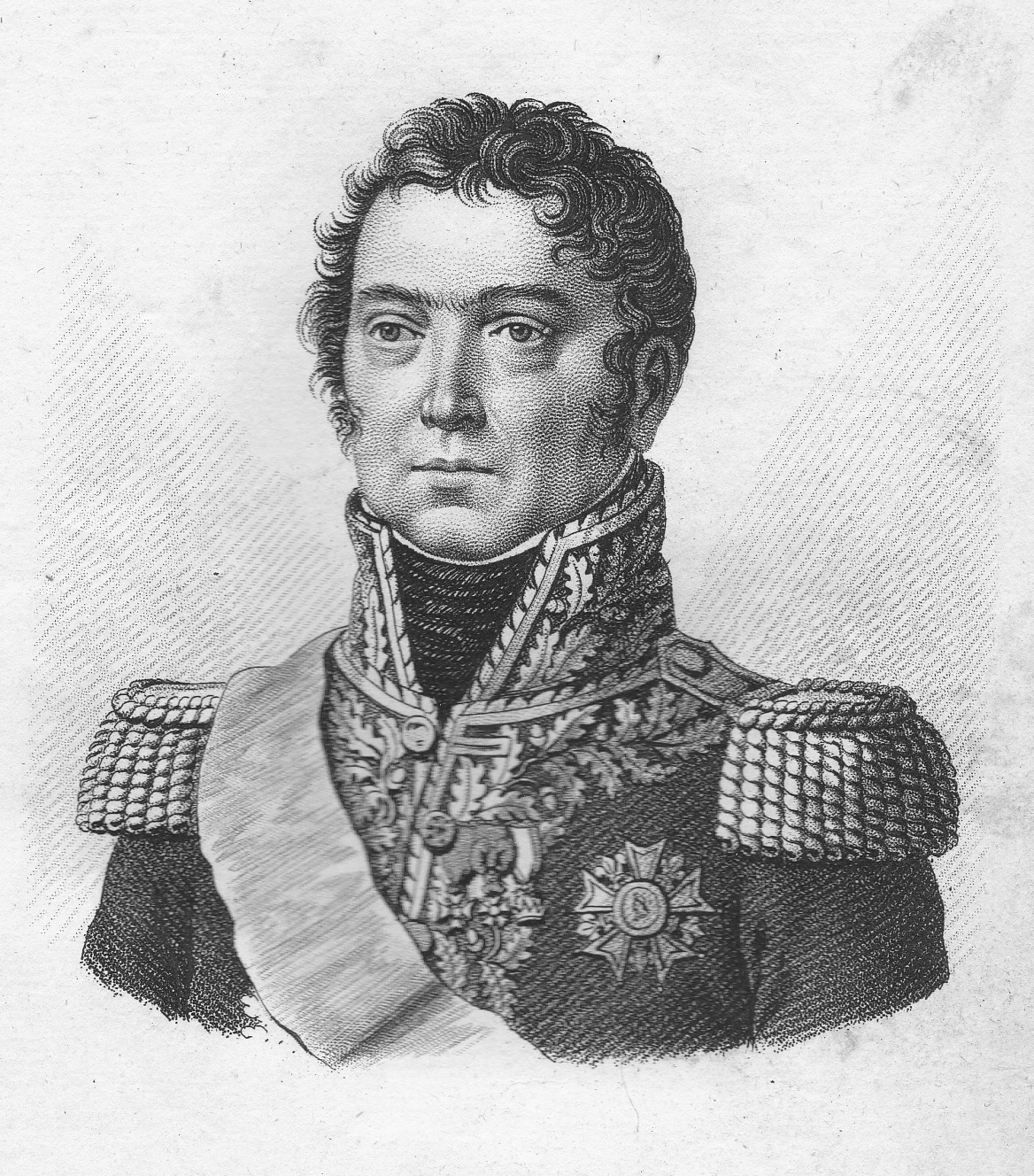
Paul Grenier

Instead of following orders, Rosenberg began sending his troops across the Po near Bassignana, which was upstream from where the Tanaro emptied into the Po. Grand Duke Constantine was almost certainly responsible for ordering Rosenberg to ignore Suvorov's instructions. At first the Allies believed that Valenza was unoccupied, so that a plan was made on 8 May to cross the Po. On 10 May it was discovered that Valenza was held by the French. During this time, Nikolay Andreyevich Chubarov explored Mugarone island in the Po River and found it to be a suitable crossing place. Chubarov set up a flying bridge from the north bank to the island. A cable connected the north bank with the island so that a ferry boat could be quickly hauled across the deep channel. The Russian preparations were so obvious that Moreau believed it was a feint and not a real attack. He ordered Grenier to leave a few outposts and march his division south to Alessandria to face the gathering threat from Suvorov to the east.

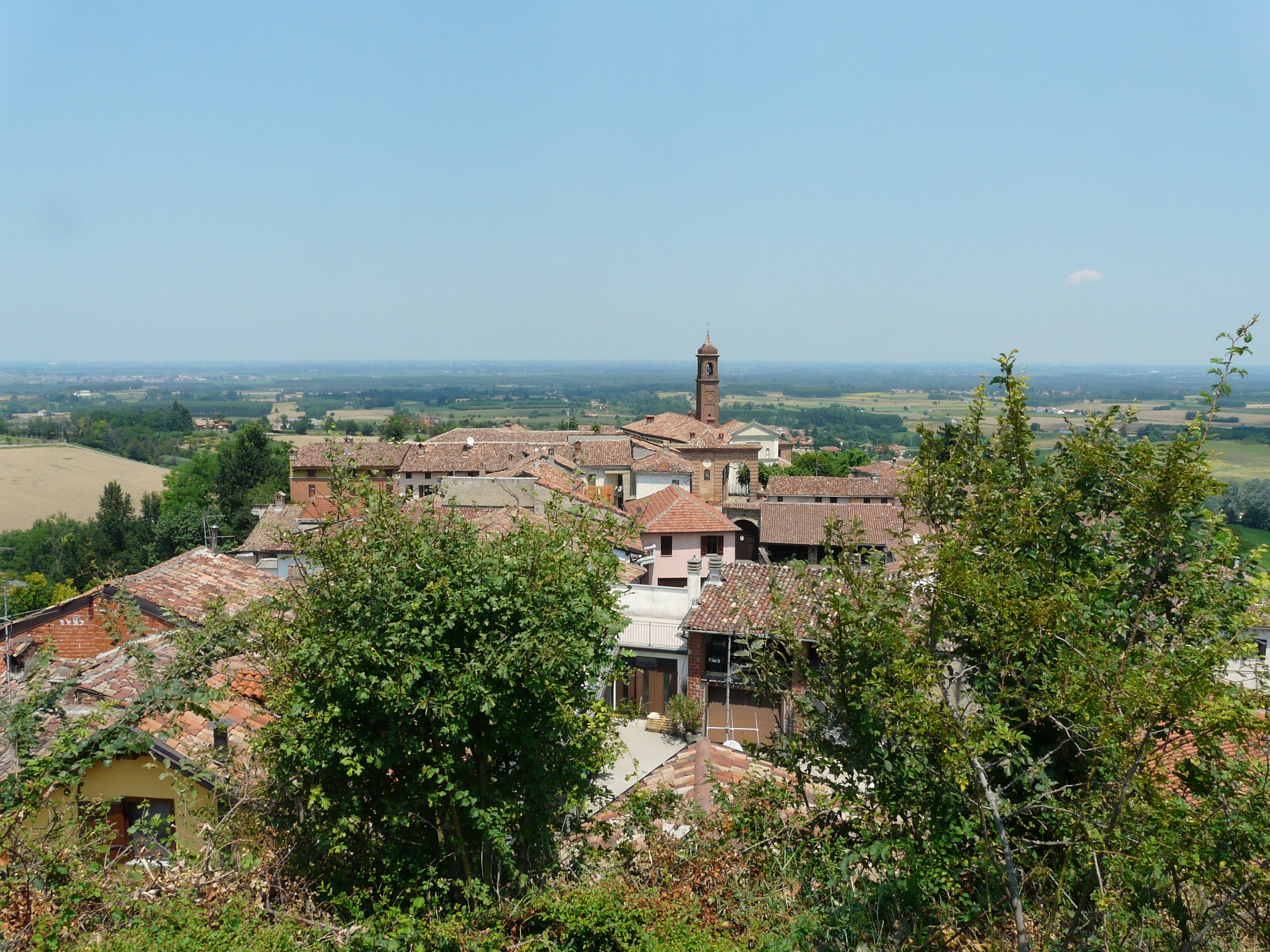
Pecetto di Valenza occupies higher ground than the nearby countryside as can be seen in this photograph.

On the evening of 11 May 1799, Rosenberg sent 4,000 Russians across to the island. Crossing on the ferry were three grenadier battalions, three jäger companies, and the Semernikov Cossack Regiment. Ivan Ivanovich Dahlheim with two infantry battalions crossed on small craft. The Russians waited on the island until daylight. On the morning of 12 May, the Russians waded across two shoulder-deep fords shown to them by the local people. Grand Duke Constantine crossed early and led the troops as they drove off Grenier's outposts. The residents of Bassignana welcomed the Russians and chopped down the "Tree of Liberty" that the French had planted in their town. At this time, Rosenberg began transferring more troops from the north bank to the island. The Russians on the south bank moved southwest past the hamlet of Pellizzari and began encountering French resistance at the village of Pecetto di Valenza.

There are two different accounts of what happened next. The first source stated that the French defenders posted at Pecetto and the Brico di San Antonio (hill) farther north drove off the initial wave of Cossacks. Russian infantry came up early in the afternoon and by 4:15 pm they dislodged the French from Pecetto. Sometime before this, Moreau was completely alerted by this unexpected threat. He instructed Grenier's division to turn back to repel the Russians and sent Gaspard Amédée Gardanne with his reserve. He also ordered Victor's division to the scene. When Grenier's division swept forward it soon recaptured Pecetto. Chubarov tried manfully to rally his troops to hold back the French.

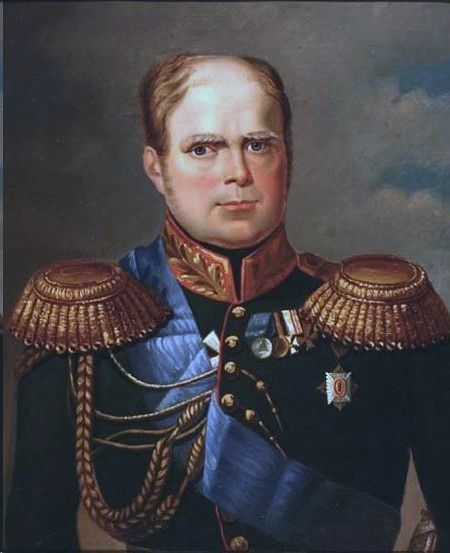
Gr. Duke Constantine

The second source asserted that Moreau, who was in Valenza, ordered the outposts in Bassignana to fall back to Grenier's main line. Chubarov advanced with the Cossacks and 2,500 infantry in three and one-half battalions. Grenier deployed his division facing east with Valenza on his left. His line included the high ground of the Sant' Antonio ridge and Pecetto. He posted Louis Gareau's brigade on the left and François Jean Baptiste Quesnel's brigade on the right. Gardanne's reserve was on Quesnel's right. Moreau ordered Victor to quickly march to the battlefield from the south. Beginning about 1:00 pm, the Russians led by Constantine attacked Quesnel's brigade at Pecetto but were consistently repulsed. When Victor's approaching columns began to appear on the hills to the south, the Russians became unnerved and started to retreat.

At about this moment, a staff officer from Suvorov appeared with an order from the army commander. It read, "The count has commanded you to dispatch a courier to inform him whether you are really crossing to join us. We have completely abandoned the project of taking Valenza... Bring as many troops as you can and join us here, and just leave pickets and observation posts opposite Valenza". The officer had ordered that no more troops be brought across the Po and instructed the troops already on the south bank to evacuate the bridgehead. Constantine rushed back and overruled the staff officer; he ordered the battalions from the Miloradovich, Schveikovsky and Rosenberg regiments and two companies from the Tyrtov Regiment to join the battle. One observer, the Austrian Colonel MacDermott wrote that the Russian soldiers' steadfastness and courage saved them from being wiped out. In contrast, Russian Captain Gryazev admitted that the retreat turned into an embarrassing rout in which the soldiers ran away, ignoring the pleas of their officers to stand and fight. Meanwhile, the residents of Bassignana, who had hailed the Russians as liberators in the morning, now jeered and even fired upon their fleeing would-be saviors.

If Victor's division had intervened, the entire Russian force might have been captured, but his troops were too tired and too hungry to march another step. To distract the French, Rosenberg ordered Mikhail Semyonovich Zhukov with two battalions to make a demonstration opposite Valenza and Vukassovich to thrust at Casale Monferrato. Both operations failed and any troops that reached the south bank of the Po were killed, captured or driven off. By evening, the Russian survivors from Bassignana returned to the island where they were unable to cross to the north bank. A local resident had cut the cable to the north bank, and it took time to retrieve the drifting ferry. Once the flying bridge was reestablished, the wounded soldiers were transported to the north bank first and the able-bodied troops had to wait their turn. While the Russians huddled helplessly on the island, French artillery began raking them with canister shot in the dark. Constantine's horse bolted into the river and the grand duke was saved when a Cossack swam to him and fished him out. At 2:00 am Constantine crossed to the north bank in a small boat while an aide-de-camp propelled the vessel with his spontoon.

== Result ==
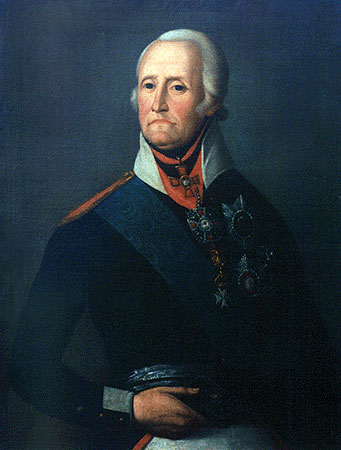
Andrei Rosenberg

One authority stated that the French sustained 617 casualties at Bassignana. Suvorov admitted that his soldiers suffered 992 casualties. Chasteler estimated Russian losses as 1,500, while MacDermott believed Russian casualties were nearly 2,000. The number of Russian combatants was estimated at 7,000. A second source stated that the French lost 600 killed, wounded, and missing out of 12,000 men present. Out of a total of 3,500 troops, the Russians lost 333 killed and 659 wounded (992 total), plus 300 men and two guns captured. A third source reported that French General of Brigade Quesnel was wounded and that the French captured four guns. The Russians lost one colonel and six other officers killed, General-major Chubarov, two colonels, two lieutenant colonels, five majors, and 50 lesser officers were wounded. Chubarov had 1,296 troops, Dalheim led 1,409 soldiers, Miloradovich had 2,095 men, and Zhukov commanded 1,475 troops.

It was unthinkable to officially blame the czar's son Constantine for the debacle. Rosenberg wrote to Suvorov, "As a subordinate I accept my guilt without any excuses. But if Your Excellency will take the trouble to investigate..." Suvorov concocted an order of the day which followed Rosenberg's account, stating that the order of recall arrived too late. He then praised his soldiers, asserting that they had victory in their grasp when someone beat the signal to retreat on the drum. The Russian commander then found fault with Vukassovich's abortive operation. Finally, Suvorov held a private interview with Constantine after which the grand duke came out with tears in his eyes. At the end, Suvorov lashed out at Constantine's hapless aide-de-camp, vowing to send him home if he allowed the grand duke to get into any more trouble.

Moreau saw that Suvorov's army was split by the Po, with most of the Russians on the north bank and most of the Austrians on the south bank. He concentrated the bulk of his army near Alessandria and sent Victor on a reconnaissance in force eastward toward Tortona on 16 May. This resulted in an Allied victory in the First Battle of Marengo.

== Forces ==
=== French order of battle ===
Jean Victor Marie Moreau's forces at Bassignana
| Divisions | Brigades | Units | Unit Commanders |
|---|---|---|---|
| Division Grenier; General of Division; Paul Grenier | Colonel; Louis Stanislas Xavier Soyez | (France) 18th Light Infantry Demi-Brigade, 3 battalions | Louis Stanislas Xavier Soyez |
| Division Grenier; General of Division; Paul Grenier | Colonel; Louis Stanislas Xavier Soyez | (France) 106th Line Infantry Demi-brigade, 2nd Battalion | Jean Claude Roussel |
| Division Grenier; General of Division; Paul Grenier | Colonel; Louis Gareau | (France) 63rd Line Infantry Demi-brigade, 3 battalions | __ Villaret |
| Division Grenier; General of Division; Paul Grenier | Colonel; Louis Gareau | (France) 68th Line Infantry Demi-brigade, 2nd Battalion | Jules-Alexander Boutrouë |
| Division Grenier; General of Division; Paul Grenier | Colonel; Louis Gareau | (France) 106th Line Infantry Demi-brigade, 1st Battalion | __ Dupellin |
| Division Grenier; General of Division; Paul Grenier | General of Brigade; François Jean Baptiste Quesnel (WIA) | (France) 17th Light Infantry Demi-Brigade, 2 battalions | Dominique Honoré Antoine Vedel |
| Division Grenier; General of Division; Paul Grenier | General of Brigade; François Jean Baptiste Quesnel (WIA) | (France) 14th Line Infantry Demi-brigade | Jean Claude Moreau |
| Division Grenier; General of Division; Paul Grenier | General of Brigade; Louis Partouneaux | (France) 24th Line Infantry Demi-Brigade, 3 battalions | __ Guinet |
| Division Grenier; General of Division; Paul Grenier | General of Brigade; Louis Partouneaux | (France) 33rd Line Infantry Demi-brigade, 2 battalions | François Roguet |
| Division Grenier; General of Division; Paul Grenier | Cavalry | (France) 6th Hussar Regiment | Jean-Baptiste Gregoire Delaroche |
| Division Grenier; General of Division; Paul Grenier | Cavalry | (France) 9th Horse Chasseur Regiment | Claude Mathieu Gardanne |
| Division Grenier; General of Division; Paul Grenier | Cavalry | (France) 13th Horse Chasseur Regiment | __ Bouquet |
| Division Grenier; General of Division; Paul Grenier | Cavalry | (France) 24th Horse Chasseur Regiment | - |
| Reserve | General of Brigade; Gaspard Amédée Gardanne | 1st Infantry Demi-Brigade, 2nd Battalion Aosta | - |
| Reserve | General of Brigade; Gaspard Amédée Gardanne | 3rd Infantry Demi-brigade, 2nd Battalion Regina | - |
| Reserve | General of Brigade; Gaspard Amédée Gardanne | 1st Swiss Legion Battalion | - |
| Reserve | General of Brigade; Gaspard Amédée Gardanne | Artillery Company | - |
| Reserve | General of Brigade; Gaspard Amédée Gardanne | (France) 1st Hussar Regiment | Joseph Denis Picard |
| Division Victor; General of Division; Claude Perrin Victor | Generals of Brigade; Charles Louis Dieudonné Grandjean; Henri François Marie Charpentier | (France) 3rd Line Infantry Demi-Brigade | Georges Mouton |
| Division Victor; General of Division; Claude Perrin Victor | Generals of Brigade; Charles Louis Dieudonné Grandjean; Henri François Marie Charpentier | (France) 5th Line Infantry Demi-Brigade | Louis Hyacinthe Le Feron |
| Division Victor; General of Division; Claude Perrin Victor | Generals of Brigade; Charles Louis Dieudonné Grandjean; Henri François Marie Charpentier | (France) 21st Line Infantry Demi-Brigade | __ Robert |
| Division Victor; General of Division; Claude Perrin Victor | Generals of Brigade; Charles Louis Dieudonné Grandjean; Henri François Marie Charpentier | (France) 39th Line Infantry Demi-Brigade | Antoine Louis Popon de Maucune |
| Division Victor; General of Division; Claude Perrin Victor | Generals of Brigade; Charles Louis Dieudonné Grandjean; Henri François Marie Charpentier | (France) 92nd Line Infantry Demi-Brigade, 3 battalions | Bruno Albert Joseph Duplouy |
| Division Victor; General of Division; Claude Perrin Victor | Generals of Brigade; Charles Louis Dieudonné Grandjean; Henri François Marie Charpentier | (France) 93rd Line Infantry Demi-Brigade | Charles Sebastien Marion |
| Division Victor; General of Division; Claude Perrin Victor | Generals of Brigade; Charles Louis Dieudonné Grandjean; Henri François Marie Charpentier | (France) 99th Line Infantry Demi-Brigade | Pierre Joseph Petit |
| Division Victor; General of Division; Claude Perrin Victor | Cavalry | (France) 18th Cavalry Regiment | Denis Terreyre |
| Division Victor; General of Division; Claude Perrin Victor | Cavalry | (France) 3rd Horse Chasseur Regiment | François Alexandre Grosjean |
| Division Victor; General of Division; Claude Perrin Victor | Cavalry | (France) 15th Horse Chasseur Regiment | Louis Lepic |

=== Austro-Russian order of battle ===
Andrei Grigorevich Rosenberg's forces at Bassignana
| Brigades | Units | Strength |
|---|---|---|
| General-major; Nikolay Andreyevich Chubarov (WIA) | (Russia) 8th Jäger Regiment, 2 battalions | 708 |
| General-major; Nikolay Andreyevich Chubarov (WIA) | (Russia) Semernikov Cossack Regiment | 438 |
| General-major; Nikolay Andreyevich Chubarov (WIA) | (Holy Roman Empire) Karaczay Light Dragoon Regiment Nr. 4, 1 squadron | 150 |
| General-major; Ivan Ivanovich Dalheim | (Russia) Jung Baden Musketeer Regiment, one battalion | 690 |
| General-major; Ivan Ivanovich Dalheim | (Russia) Tyrtov Musketeer Regiment, one battalion | 719 |
| General-major; Mikhail Miloradovich | (Russia) Rosenberg Grenadier Battalion | 670 |
| General-major; Mikhail Miloradovich | (Russia) Miloradovich Musketeer Regiment, one battalion | 725 |
| General-major; Mikhail Miloradovich | (Russia) Povalo-Shveikovsky Musketeer Regiment, one battalion | 700 |
| General-major; Mikhail Semyonovich Zhukov | (Russia) Grenadier Battalion | 599 |
| General-major; Mikhail Semyonovich Zhukov | (Russia) Dalheim Musketeer Regiment, 1st Battalion | 719 |
| General-major; Mikhail Semyonovich Zhukov | (Holy Roman Empire) Karaczay Light Dragoon Regiment Nr. 4, 1 squadron | 157 |

== See also ==
- Capture of Brescia
- Battle of Cassano
- First Battle of Marengo
- Battle of Modena
- Battle of the Trebbia
- Second Battle of Marengo
- Battle of Novi

== Sources ==
- Acerbi, Enrico (2007). "The 1799 Campaign in Italy: Waiting for MacDonald's Army (May-June 1799), the Battles of Bassignana and Marengo". The Napoleon Series.
- Duffy, Christopher (1999). Eagles Over the Alps: Suvarov in Italy and Switzerland, 1799. Chicago, Ill.: The Emperor's Press. ISBN 1-883476-18-6.
- Phipps, Ramsay Weston (2011) [1939]. The Armies of the First French Republic and the Rise of the Marshals of Napoleon I: The Armies of the Rhine in Switzerland, Holland, Italy, Egypt, and the Coup d'Etat of Brumaire (1797-1799). Vol. 5. Pickle Partners Publishing. ISBN 978-1-908692-28-3.
- Smith, Digby (1998). The Napoleonic Wars Data Book. London: Greenhill. ISBN 1-85367-276-9.

| Preceded by Battle of Cassano (1799) | French Revolution: Revolutionary campaigns Battle of Bassignana (1799) | Succeeded by Battle of San Giuliano |
