= Capture of Brescia =

Part of the Napoleonic Wars in 1799

- Part of Suvorov's Italian campaign in the War of the Second Coalition
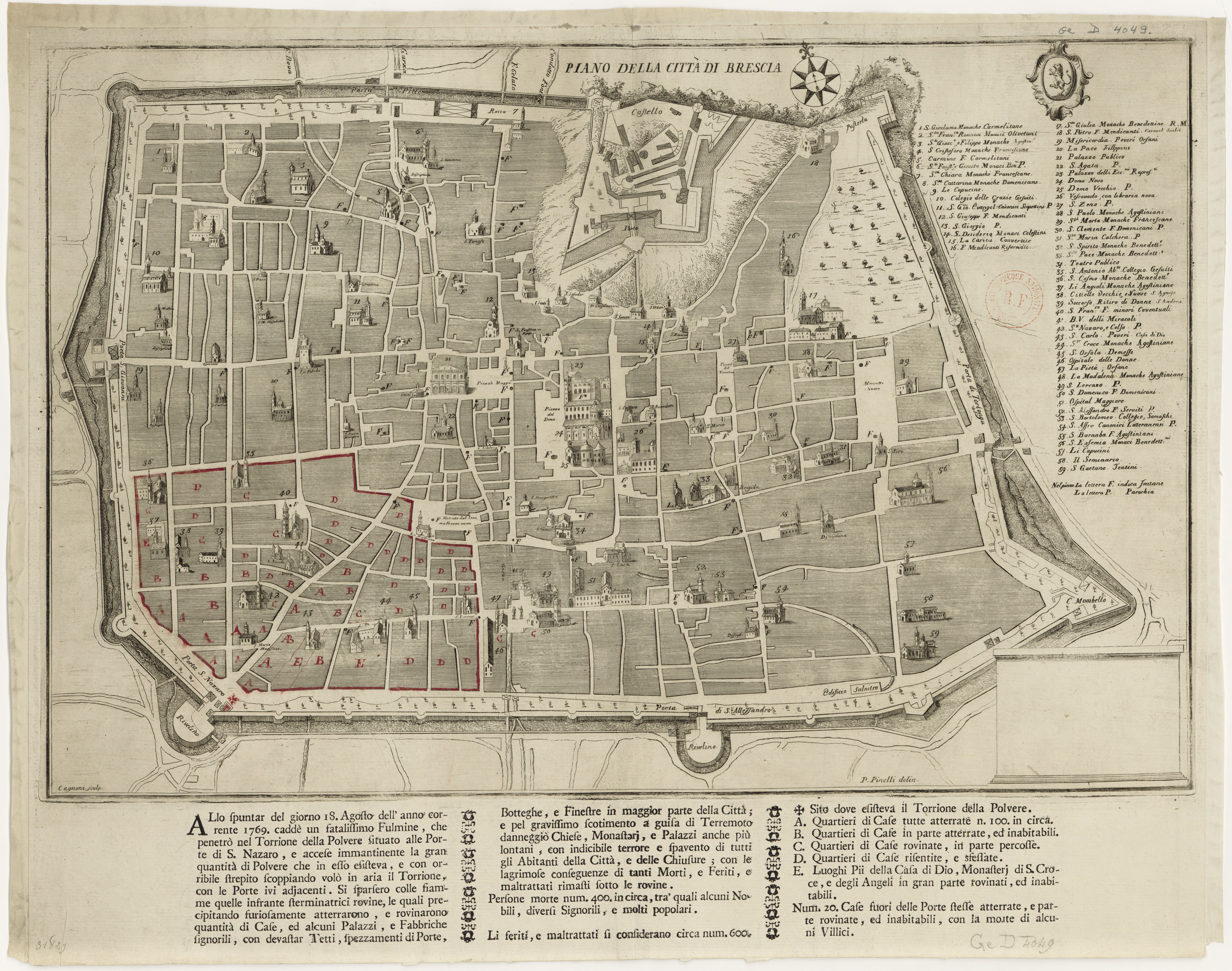
- Brescia City Plan; Bibliothèque nationale de France
Date	21 April 1799
Location	Brescia, Northern Italy
Result	Allied victory
Territorial changes	Capture of Brescia by Suvorov's forces

Belligerents
Russian Empire (Holy Roman Empire) Habsburg Empire	French Republic

Commanders and leaders
(Russian Empire) Alexander Suvorov (Russian Empire) Pyotr Bagration (Holy Roman Empire) Philipp Vukassovich (Holy Roman Empire) Paul Kray (Holy Roman Empire) Johann Zopf	(French First Republic) Barthélemy Schérer (French First Republic) Gen. Bouzet

Strength
>20,000	1,100

Casualties and losses
Absent	The entire garrison and 46 cannon captured

The capture of Brescia took place on 21 April 1799, (Note: Old Style: 10 Apr. 1799) during the Second Coalition war: General Field Marshal Count A. V. Suvorov's Russian and Habsburg troops took the fortress city of Brescia, having captivated the French garrison of General Bouzet.

Alexander Suvorov-Rymniksky, realising the importance of the impression of his first encounter with the French, sent here the vanguard of Kray and the division of Zopf, a total of 15,000 men assembled, and ordered Vukassovich to descend from the mountains also to Brescia; in all, more than 20,000 men. Field Marshal Suvorov ordered to assault the fortress, and not to conclude with the commandant of the honourable capitulation: "otherwise, — he said, — the enemy will hold in every blockhouse, and we will lose both time and men".

The Austrians, approaching the town, opened artillery fire and occupied the dominant heights on the north side; Bagration positioned himself on the west side and blocked the French possible escape routes. Bouzet would not have been able to defend a vast city with a small force, so he retreated to the citadel. Perhaps because the inhabitants were annoyed by French extortions and force, they opened the city gates to the Russo-Austrian coalition and rushed to chop down the arbres de la liberté. Bouzet responded to an offer to surrender by firing shots. However, the French did not endure. Suvorov was right: after a harmless skirmish commandant, frightened by the active preparations for the assault, agreed to send him a firm offer of unconditional surrender; 46 cannons were taken; losses killed and wounded were not. The capture of Brescia provided the Allies with a good foundry, ensured communication with Tyrol, opened a better road for communication with the Mincio and further with the Adige, made a strong moral impression on the country (the anti-Republican party raised its head) and on the Allied troops: "the army demanded to be led to new victories".

The Allied army would further clash with Schérer's army at Lecco.

== See also ==
- Capture of Bergamo
- Battle of Cassano
- Battle of Bassignana (1799)
- First Battle of Marengo (1799)
- Battle of Modena (1799)
- Battle of the Trebbia
- Second Battle of Marengo (1799)
- Battle of Novi

== Sources ==
- Petrushevsky, Alexander (1884). "Итальянская кампания: Адда; 1799" [Italian Campaign: Adda; 1799]. Генералиссимус князь Суворов [Generalissimo Prince Suvorov] (in Russian). Vol. 3 (1st ed.). St. Petersburg: Типография М. М. Стасюлевича.
- Orlov, Nikolay Aleksandrovich (1892). Разбор военных действий Суворова в Италии в 1799 году [Analysis of Suvorov's military actions in Italy in 1799] (in Russian). St. Petersburg: Типография Тренке и Фюсно. ISBN 9785998994289.
