= Second Battle of Marengo =

1799 battle of the Second Coalition war

Second Battle of Marengo (1799)
- Part of Suvorov's Italian campaign during the war of the Second Coalition
| Date | 20 June 1799 |
| Location | Spinetta Marengo, present-day Italy 44°53′N 8°41′E |
| Result | French victory |

Belligerents
| (French First Republic) France | (Holy Roman Empire) Austria |

Commanders and leaders
| (French First Republic) Jean Victor Moreau | (Holy Roman Empire) Heinrich Bellegarde |

Strength
| 14,000 | 8,000 |

Casualties and losses
| 900–1,000 | 2,300–3,000, 3 guns |

The Second Battle of Marengo or Battle of Cascina Grossa (20 June 1799) saw French troops under General of Division Jean Victor Marie Moreau clash with a force of Austrian soldiers led by Feldmarschall-Leutnant Heinrich von Bellegarde. The early fighting between Emmanuel Grouchy's division and Bellegarde was inconclusive. However, late in the day Moreau committed Paul Grenier's French division to the struggle and the Austrians were driven from the field. This War of the Second Coalition battle occurred near Spinetta Marengo which is just east of Alessandria, Italy.

Moreau was supposed to cooperate with Jacques MacDonald's army which was grappling with Alexander Suvorov's Austro-Russians at the Battle of the Trebbia (1799) to the east. When Moreau moved north, Bellegarde offered battle because his task was to keep the French from joining MacDonald. Moreau was too late; that day MacDonald's defeated army began to retreat from the Trebbia River. The French victory was barren because Moreau soon had to withdraw to the mountains to avoid being caught by Suvorov's returning soldiers.

== See also ==
- Capture of Brescia
- Battle of Cassano
- Battle of Bassignana
- First Battle of Marengo
- Battle of Modena
- Battle of the Trebbia
- Battle of Novi

| Preceded by Battle of Trebbia (1799) | French Revolution: Revolutionary campaigns Battle of Cascina Grossa (1799) | Succeeded by Battle of Novi (1799) |
