= Louis Léonard Antoine de Colli-Ricci =

Italian general

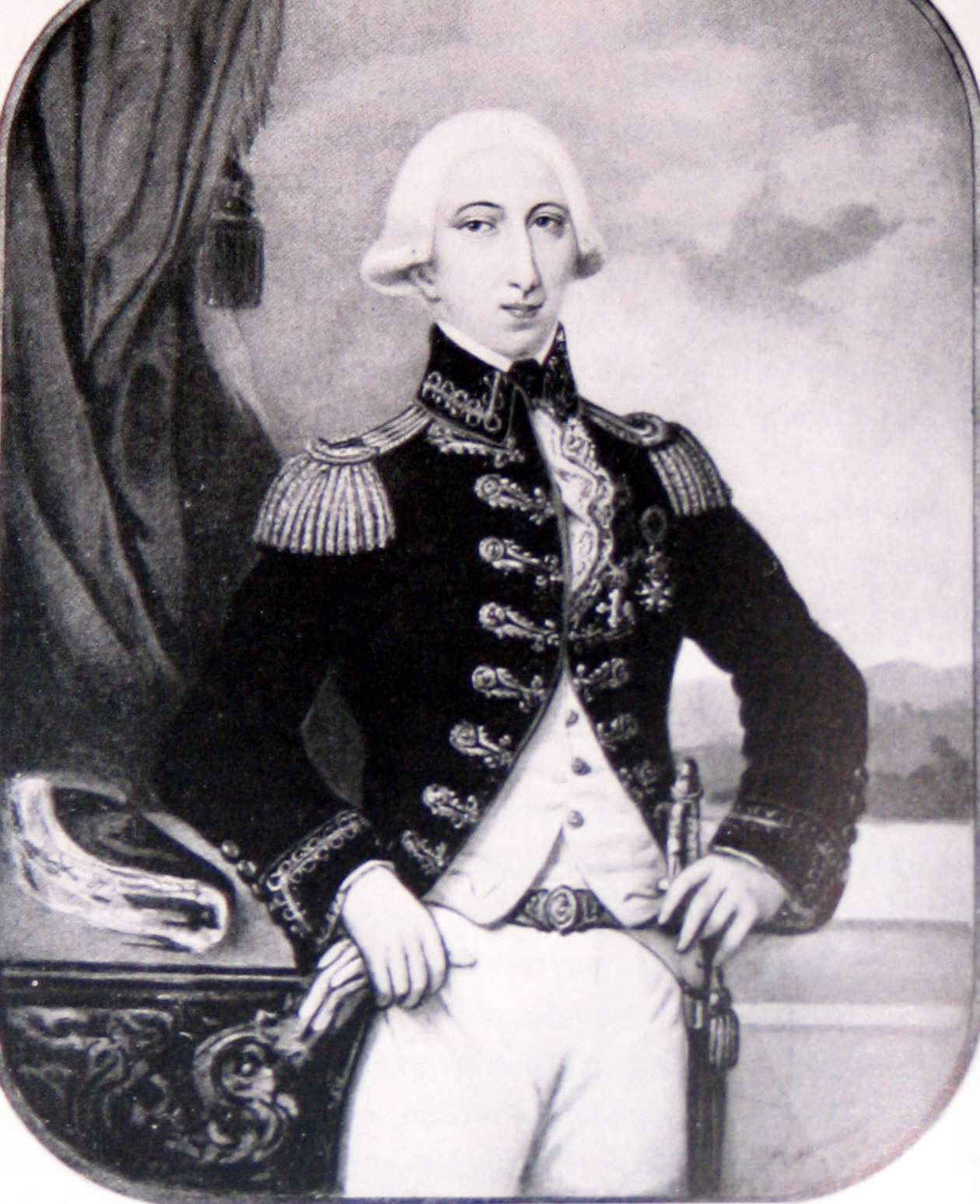
Louis Léonard Antoine de Colli-Ricci

Louis Léonard Antoine de Colli-Ricci or Luigi Leonardo Colli Ricci (23 March 1760 – 31 March 1806) was an Italian general. A nephew of the Italian writer Vittorio Alfieri, Louis Léonard Antoine Joseph Gaspard Venance Colli-Ricci was also known as Luigi Leonardo Antonio Giuseppe Gasparde Venanzio Colli-Ricci. He joined the army of Piedmont as an ensign in 1773, in 1775 he was promoted to lieutenant, and in 1781 he was promoted to capitaine. Colli-Ricci initially served against the French during the French Revolutionary Wars and in 1793 he was wounded at Argentière. In 1794 he took command of the 2nd Battalion of Piedmontese Chasseurs and in 1795 he was promoted to lieutenant colonel. That November Colli-Ricci was wounded in the thigh near Ronchini but less than a week later he was promoted to colonel. In 1796 he commanded the regiment composed of the 1st and 2nd Battalions of Chasseurs and in 1797 he served as chief of staff of the auxiliary division formed near Novare.
