= François Watrin =

French infantry commander (1772–1802)

- Born: 29 January 1772; Beauvais, France
- Died: 22 November 1802 (aged 30); Port-au-Prince, Haiti
- Military career
- Allegiance: France
- Branch: Infantry
- Service years: 1792–1802
- Rank: General of Division
- Conflicts: French Revolutionary Wars
- Awards: Name inscribed under the Arc de Triomphe

François Watrin (29 January 1772 in Beauvais – 22 November 1802 in Port-au-Prince) was a French infantry commander during the French Revolutionary Wars.

== See also ==
- List of French generals of the Revolutionary and Napoleonic Wars

== Sources ==
- Six, Georges (1934). Dictionnaire biographique des généraux et amiraux de la Révolution et de l'Empire, Vol. II (in French). Paris, France: Librairie historique et nobiliaire.
