= Battle of Cassano (1799) =

1799 battle of the War of the Second Coalition

Battle of the Adda River (1799)
- Part of Suvorov's Italian campaign in the War of the Second Coalition
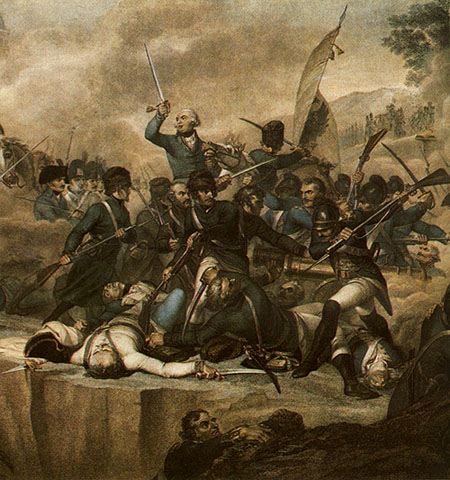
- Feldmarshal Suvorov at the battle of the Adda River on April 27, 1799 (engraving by Luigi Schiavonetti)
Date	26 April: Combat of Lecco; 27–28 April: Battle of Cassano (Note: The Battle of Cassano relates to all the clashes between 27 and 28 April, according to Bodart.)
Location	Along the Adda River in the Po Valley, namely at Lecco, Vaprio, Cassano and Verderio; Lombardy, Cisalpine Republic, Northern Italy; Present-day Italian Republic 45.5333°N 9.5167°E
Result	Austro-Russian victory
Territorial changes	Suvorov's Austro-Russian forces occupy the Cisalpine Republic

Belligerents
Russian Empire; Habsburg monarchy	(French First Republic) French Republic: • Helvetic Republic; • Polish Legion; • Piedmontese Republic

Commanders and leaders
(Russian Empire) Alexander Suvorov (Russian Empire) Pyotr Bagration (WIA) (Russian Empire) Adrian Denisov (Russian Empire) Andrey Rosenberg (Russian Empire) Mikhail Miloradovich (Russian Empire) Yakov Povalo-Shveikovsky (Holy Roman Empire) Michael von Melas (Holy Roman Empire) Johann Chasteler (Holy Roman Empire) Michael von Fröhlich (Holy Roman Empire) Konrad von Kaim (Holy Roman Empire) Peter Ott (Holy Roman Empire) Philipp Vukassovich (Holy Roman Empire) Friedrich Hohenzollern-Hechingen (Holy Roman Empire) Friedrich von Seckendorff (Holy Roman Empire) Johann Zopf (Holy Roman Empire) Franz Reisky	(French First Republic) Barthélemy Schérer (French First Republic) Jean Moreau (French First Republic) Paul Grenier (French First Republic) Claude Victor-Perrin (French First Republic) Jean Sérurier (POW) (French First Republic) François Quesnel (French First Republic) Nicolas Beker (French First Republic) Louis Soyez (French First Republic) Georges Kister (French First Republic) François Argod † (French First Republic) Jean Roussel

Units involved
Allied Field Army: Bagration's Advance Guard; Rosenberg's Corps; Vukassovich's Division; Ott's Division; Zopf's Division; Fröhlich and Kaim's Division.; Beyond that: Seckendorff's Detachment; Hohenzollern's Detachment.	Army of Italy: Sérurier's Division; Grenier's Division; Victor's Division; Laboissière's Detachment.

Strength
48,000–49,000 (Note: Overall (different estimates): 65,000; 70,000; (Note: Clodfelter: 52,000 Austrians, 18,500 Russians.); 70,700; (Note: Duffy: 50,700 Austrians, 20,000 Russians.); 71,000. This was the sizes of the army before Kray was detached for the siege of Mantua; the full strength of the Austrian army in Venetia, Illyria and Istria was 86,000, and the Russian 20,000 in Italy. Of the 86,000 Austrians, only 50,700 stood at the disposal of the hard-fighting Lieutenant-General Kray behind the Adige River.; Operating against the French: 52,000. Present forces for the first half of April: 49,097 (with an unknown number of Austrian gunners and technicians). Suvorov had 42,000 between Lecco and Cassano. In action (different estimates): 48,000; 48,500; (Note: Orlov: 55 battalions, 50 squadrons, 4 Cossack regiments.); 49,000; nearly 50,000.; • c. 36,500 (Note: 30,000 excluding Hohenzollern's 5,000 (opposite the fortress of Pizzighettone) and Seckendorff's 1,500 (near Lodi).); • c. 12,000 (Note: Bagration Advance Guard and the main force of the Rosenberg Corps. The total at Suvorov's disposal was 20,000.) Seckendorff and Hohenzollern with 6,500 troops were detached for diversion on the French right flank.) Numbers engaged: Lecco; 4,993 (Note: Initially 1,343 regulars and 1,479 irregulars, or a total of 2,822 soldiers (1,479 irregular Cossack cavalry, which would then take part at Vaprio): numbers not counting the reinforcements that came to Bagration (Austrians who were not involved in the affair are also not counted). Along with reinforcements it was 3,514 regulars, since three battalions approached Bagration (Dendrygin, Rosenberg, Baranovsky). A grand total of 4,993 Russians referring to the data of Acerbi. According to another source, at the beginning of the battle it was about 3,000 regular troops and Cossacks, but no further numbers have been given.); 3,514 regular army; 1,479 Cossacks; Vaprio; 9,721 (Note: Ott Division at San Gervasio and Zopf Division: 9,721 to 10,000 men. Acerbi gave the exact strength of Zopf's division as 4,721 men located in Canonica, and this figure is almost the same as the later from San Donato according to some sources (4,700), so it may be incomplete in this case; however, these are more approximate figures, in contrast to Acerbi's findings, hence Acerbi's data attached. There is also Zopf's division strength of 5,126 for April 14, 1799. As Orlov noted, at the end of the battle, Vaprio had gathered about 11,000 allies. Reinforcements approached the battlefield gradually; first Denisov's Cossacks and then Ott's leading units pushed the French back from Trezzo. After that, the French gained a significant numerical advantage by concentrating their forces and drove back the allies, but as more reinforcements were arriving across the river, with the Austrian and Russian pressures increasing, they were little by little thrown backwards, and Moreau ordered a general retreat. Also, Ott along with Zopf and Denisov cut off Sérurier's detachment at Verderio Superiore from Moreau's main force. During the same combat at Vaprio, Grenier twice took a position suitable for defence near the village itself. While the first attack on it was unsuccessful, by the second offensive the assaulting Austrian troops had 9,721 men, whereas the French had 7,500. Cossacks did not participate in the second attack.); 1,500 Cossacks (Note: Denisov's Cossacks (irreg. forces); three regiments; took part at the bypass of Trezzo and, in the midst of battle, halted the successful French advance in conjunction with Austrian hussars, whereupon they overturned the 24th Chasseurs à Cheval Regiment.); Cassano; 13,000 (Note: Kaim and Fröhlich Divisions. The final assault was led by Reisky Regiment. (Reisky von Dubnitz with 1,911 men conducted the successful Austrian assault on the bridgehead fortifications at Cassano) When Suvorov ordered Melas to take Cassano at all costs, the Austrians placed 30 guns, built a bridge, rushed to assault the fortifications and burst into them so quickly that the French had no time to destroy the bridge over the river and remove the guns while retreating to the right bank of the Adda.); Verderio; 7,000 (Note: Vukassovich Division.); 470 Cossacks (Note: Pozdneev Cossacks (irreg. forces). Rosenberg's regular troops (~9,530 men, including 1,000 Austrian cavalrymen) were not engaged; seeing them approaching the battlefield, Sérurier decided to lay down arms, however, he was already cut off and surrounded by superior forces before Rosenberg's possible arrival on the battlefield. Despite stubborn resistance, he was unable to repel Vukassovich.)	27,000–28,000 (Note: Overall, up to 58,000 were available for active operations in the field (out of the 83,000-strong Army of Italy under the command of Schérer). France had about 117,000 troops spread across the Italian Peninsula. The 34,000-strong Army of Naples was engaged in looting (Central and Southern Italy). Present forces for 30 March: 46,466 (after Schérer had separated some of the units into garrisons).: • 41,686; • 2,280; • 1,600; • 900; The available forces that Moreau had during the battle after replacing Schérer: about 30,000. At the beginning of battle, the French had only 12,000 between Lecco and Cassano before reinforcements arrived. In action (different estimates): 27,000; 28,000; (Note: Orlov: 35 battalions, 37 squadrons.); less than 30,000. Laboissière (4,000), on the extreme right flank, never took part in the battle.) Numbers engaged: Lecco; 5,000 (Note: Soyez's detachment. The garrison of the town itself: 1,800+ troops (4 battalions and 1 squadron of the 108th demi-brigade). A group of French troops with artillery was also west of the bridge that at Lecco, and another group between Olginate and Brivio (the latter entered the rear of the Russian troops). 6 battalions and 4 squadrons were involved with these units. All this was part of Sérurier's division.); Vaprio; 7,500 (Note: Initial number: 7,000; that is, 9 battalions and 8 squadrons, parts of Grenier's and Victor's divisions. (without 450 to 500 men of the 24th Chasseurs à Cheval Regiment who arrived in the midst of battle, after which were repelled) Orlov's data is attached.); Cassano; 3,000 (Note: The 106th demi-brigade, left by Grenier in Cassano, entrenched behind the Retorto canal and on the bridgehead repelled Melas' attacks for 5 hours. At 4 o'clock in the afternoon Argod's brigade from Victor's division came to the support. It was 3 battalions.); Verderio; 3,000 (Note: According to Victor, 2,600. According to Vukassovich, 3,700. According to Russian records, 4,000. Casualties were: 300 killed or wounded, and 2,700 captured. Perhaps Sérurier's trapped detachment numbered just 3,000.)

Casualties and losses
2,000–2,500 killed and wounded (Note: Digby Smith, Nikolay Orlov: 2,000; Vasily Novitsky et alii, GRE: 2,500.; Loss at Lecco — 385 KIA or WIA; Loss at Vaprio & Cassano — 1,000 KIA or WIA; Loss at Verderio is unknown) Other estimates: 4,886–6,200 (Note: 4,886 Russians and Austrians according to Coalition's chief of staff Chasteler de Courcelles (per Chasteler, approximately 2,750 of these losses at Verderio); Carl von Clausewitz: 4,900 (only Austrians); Gaston Bodart: 5,000; David Eggenberger: 6,000; Micheal Clodfelter: 6,200.)	6,900–7,500 killed, wounded and captured (Note: Moreau's figure of 2,542 is probably too low, even if assume that it excludes the command of Sérurier, which had been captured whole. The Austro-Russian chief of staff Chasteler estimated French losses at 5,000, while Christopher Duffy put French losses at around 6,900 referring to the calculation by Austrian staff officer MacDermott of 8,000 KIA, WIA, and POW — it corresponds closely with a French list found later in the citadel of Alessandria; Russians authors assessments of 7,500 attributable to the entire operation on the Adda.; Loss at Lecco — 100 POW + the number of KIA / WIA that is not reliably known; Loss at Vaprio & Cassano — 2,000 POW + the large number of KIA / WIA that is not reliably known; 19 cannons; 1 standard; Loss at Verderio — 3,000 KIA, WIA, or POW) Other estimates: 10,500–11,000 (Note: Smith and Clodfelter: 2,500 killed or wounded and 5,000 captured on the 27th, and another 3,000 KIA, WIA, and POW on the 28th; Clausewitz: around 3,700 killed or wounded and 7,000 prisoners; Bodart: 4,000 dead and injured, 7,000 captured; Eggenberger's data coincide with Clausewitz's and Bodart's estimates on 7,000 prisoners, however, Eggenberger does not specified bloody casualties.) 27 guns and 3 standards
- Location within Europe

War of the Second Coalition:
Italy
current battle
Napoleon in command
Napoleon not in command

The Battle of Cassano (French: Bataille de Cassano, German: Schlacht bei Cassano) was fought in 1799 from 27 to 28 April (Note: Sometimes in historiography the Battle of Cassano is defined separately on April 27 (Vaprio d'Adda, Cassano d'Adda), and the clash at Verderio on 28 April is placed apart.) (O.S.: 16 to 17 April) near Cassano d'Adda, which about 28 km (17 mi) ENE of Milan. The clash is part of the battle of the Adda River (Russian: Сражение на реке Адда, German: Schlacht an der Adda) or the so-called forcing of the Adda, which on the first day of 26 April (O.S.: 15 April) resulted in a minor victory for the Russians under the Count Suvorov over Barthélemy Schérer's French forces at Lecco. Then, on the second day, Suvorov's Austrians and Cossacks prevailed over Jean Moreau's army, who replaced Schérer as supreme commander, and trapped his isolated division on the third. The action took place during the War of the Second Coalition, as part of the larger conflict known as the French Revolutionary Wars. Moreau was not entirely responsible for his defeat, much of the responsibility for which lies with Schérer, who overextended his troops and failed to exploit the advantages of his position.

The battle of the Adda River was four separate combats. Lecco was a victorious combat for Suvorov's Russians, but it was only a diversionary attack. Tactically, the Russian victory at Lecco is attributable to generals Bagration and Rosenberg. They fought against General Soyez. The key engagement on 27 April was the combat at Vaprio d'Adda (Note: alongside Trezzo sull'Adda; part of the battle of Cassano) (at the end there were about 11,000 Austrians and Cossacks and 7,000 French), which is north of Cassano; and on the same day, at Cassano itself, the Austrian Reisky regiment (1,911 men) successfully stormed the bridge-head fortifications—Moreau was thrown back everywhere. Suvorov himself directed the battle at Vaprio. At Cassano, it was Michael von Melas who was in command, though he acted indecisively until he received instructions from Suvorov. The French detachment under Jean-Mathieu-Philibert Sérurier cut off by the combat of Vaprio was afterwards surrounded at Verderio by Josef Philipp Vukassovich, who overcame the weakest French defenses in Brivio. Thus, the Allied army was able to overcome the river and the enemy obstacle simultaneously.

== Background ==
While General Napoleon Bonaparte campaigned in Egypt (see French campaign in Egypt and Syria), the Second Coalition launched an invasion of French-occupied Italy. General of Division (MG) Barthélemy Schérer fought inconclusive actions the Austrians at Pastrengo, Verona, and Legnago on 26 March 1799. Feldmarschal-Leutnant (FML) Pál Kray and his Austrians then defeated Schérer at the Battle of Magnano on April 4. This defeat forced the French army into a long retreat. Attempts by Schérer to hold the lines of the Mincio and Oglio rivers failed when an Austrian force led by FML Josef Vukassovich turned his northern flank. Austria's Russian allies, led by Field Marshal (FM) Suvorov, soon began appearing at the front. Back in Vicenza, when reporting on the state of affairs, the Austrians tried to find out the new commander-in-chief's plan, but the commander absentmindedly repeated: 'bayonets, bayonets,' pointing out his main method of action.

Suvorov took the fortress of Brescia without a fight. The Cossacks seized Bergamo and Prince Bagration's vanguard pushed back the French outposts in Caprino Bergamasco.

When FM Suvorov joined the allied army, he took over the top command from Kray, though the latter had just been promoted to Feldzeugmeister. The arrival of General of the Cavalry Michael von Melas displaced Kray the top Austrian field command. Therefore, Kray was assigned to capture the fortress of Mantua, while Melas and Suvorov pursued the French. The siege of Mantua lasted from April until the garrison surrendered on 28 July.

== Forces ==
=== French Army ===
Schérer deployed the divisions of MGs Paul Grenier, Claude Victor, Jean Sérurier (each of the three divisions had around 8,000 men), and Pierre de Laboissière (4,000 men; from Villa Pompeiana to the Po River) to defend the line of the Adda River. Victor's and Grenier's divisions included the Polish and Helvetic legions.

=== Coalition Army ===
The Russian advance guard was led by Pyotr Bagration (~3,000 men), and the corps by General of the Infantry Andrei Rosenberg (9,000 men of General of the Infantry Povalo-Shveikovsky's division on its way from Caprino to Lecco). The Austrians still made up the bulk of the allied army: 20,000 Russians and 30,000 Austrians at Suvorov's disposal, according to Christopher Duffy. There were the following formations of irregular Cossack cavalry: the regiments of Adrian Denisov (ataman), Pyotr Matveyevich Grekov, and Molchanov: a total of 1,500 men. The Austrian division commanders were FML Peter Ott, FML Johann Zopf (each of the two divisions had around 5,000 men), General-Major Franz de Lusignan (acting commander for FML Michael von Fröhlich), FML Konrad Valentin von Kaim (Kaim and Fröhlich's joint force was 13,000 men), and Josef Philipp Vukassovich (7,000 men). Michael von Melas was sent to Cassano and was nominally commander of all Suvorov's Austrian forces.

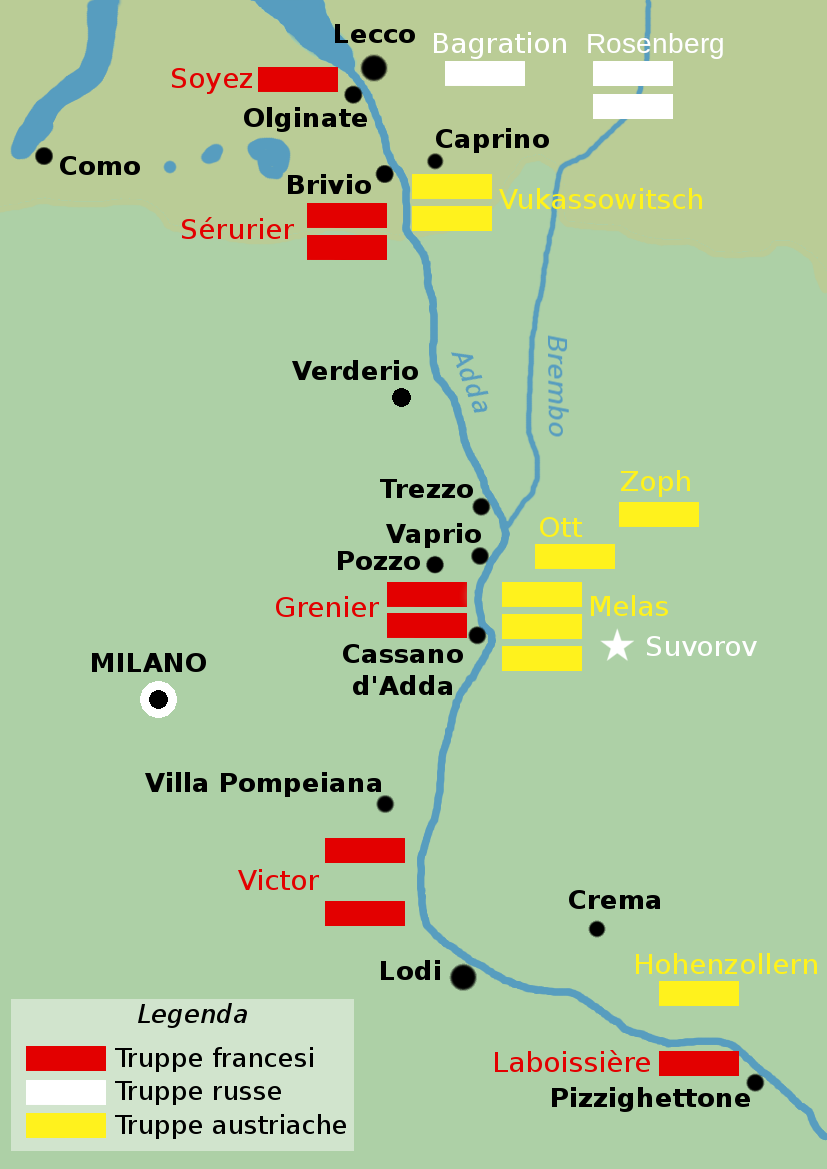
Troops in the field around April 24, 1799, before Suvorov's attack on the Adda

== Battle of the Adda River ==
Schérer relied on the advantages of his defensive position, as the river is wide and deep, has very few fords and in its upper part, as far as Cassano, flows in elevated steep banks, of which the right, occupied by the French, prevails over the left. But Schérer failed to take all the advantages of this natural defensive line. He scattered 28,000 men over 100 kilometres (62 mi) along the river, nowhere having sufficient forces for defense. Suvorov separated Hohenzollern with 6,000 men to Pizzighettone and Seckendorff to Lodi to conduct diversionary operations, and with a main body of 35,000 to 36,000 men concentrated offensive on the bulk of the French line. The disposition for April 26 instructed Ott's division to organize the crossing at Capriate San Gervasio.

The Adda battle on 26 and 27 April was divided into three different clashes: the combat of Lecco, where Suvorov sent Bagration's Russians, most likely as a distraction, and Rosenberg's corps was also on its way there; the combats near Trezzo sull'Adda and Vaprio d'Adda, where mostly Austrians were concentrated,—these fights proved decisive for the allied victory; and the combat around the fortified position of Cassano, where Melas' Austrians had been sent, they would go to the rear of the French at an end of battle with their flanking maneuver; it would be by the time the fight at Vaprio is won by the Allies, however, this manoeuvre will force Moreau to retreat in a different direction. On 28 April, at Verderio, a French detachment cut off from the main army would lay down its arms after a brief battle.

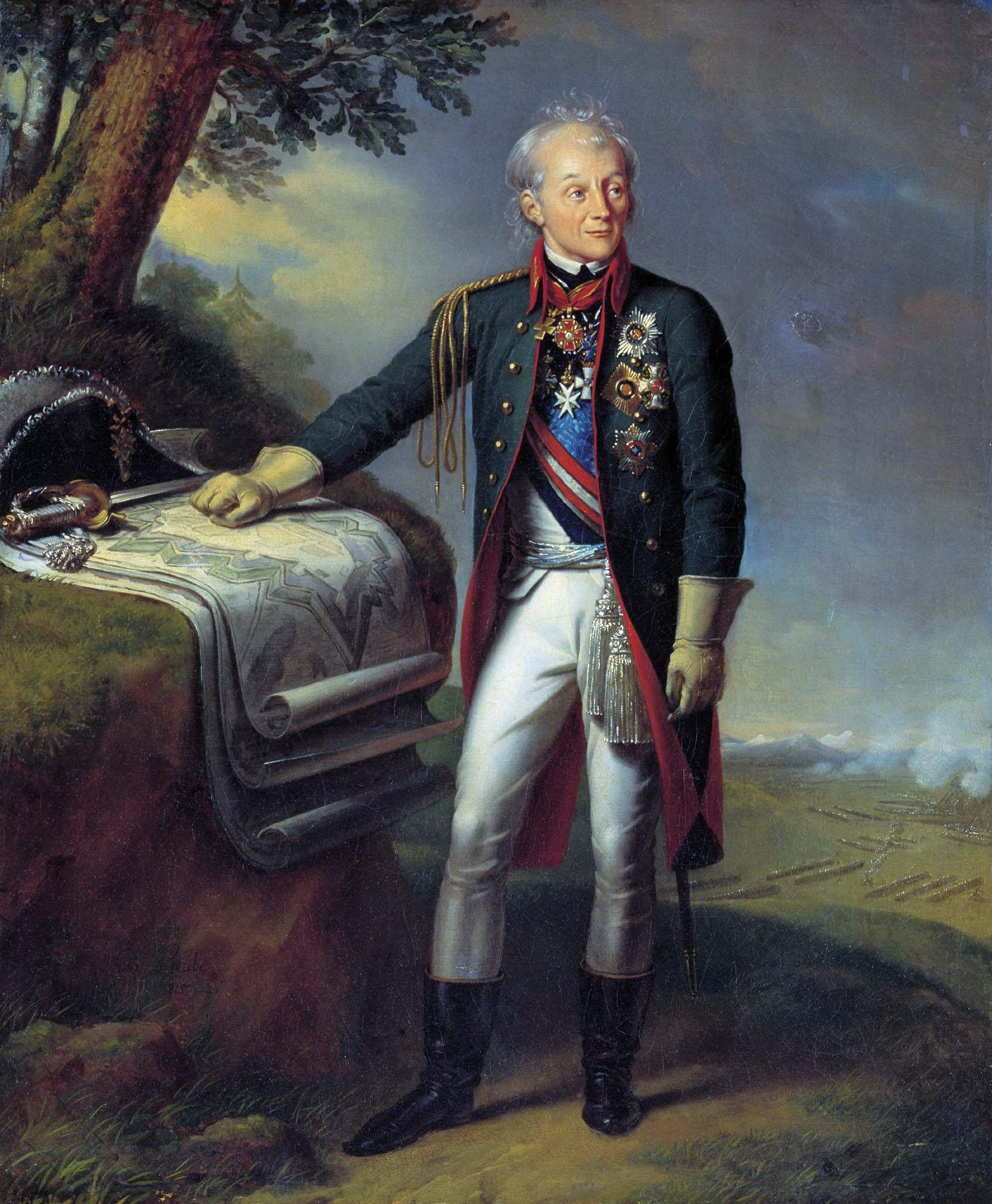
Alexander Vasilyevich Suvorov

=== Lecco ===
On the night of April 26, Prince Bagration reported that Lecco was heavily occupied by the French. Assuming the entire division of Sérurier there, Suvorov stopped Vukassovich at Caprino and the entire Russian division in order, if necessary, to support Bagration, who moved to Lecco with his regiment of jaegers, Lomonosov combined battalion and all Cossack regiments.

On the same date, Bagration, following a mountain gorge, at 8 o'clock in the morning met a small advanced French unit 2 kilometres (1.2 mi) from Lecco, overturned it and approached the city, occupied by 4 battalions, 1 squadron (108th demi-brigade) under the command of Brigadier General Soyez; on the right bank of the Adda, opposite the bridge dismantled by the French, there were 6 guns on the heights. In all, the French had 12 guns under Soyez. The Cossacks surrounded the stone-fortified city; a company with 2 licornes was placed against the bridge. Bagration divided the rest of the forces into 3 columns; one went straight to the city, the other bypassed, and the 3rd remained in reserve. The first two columns broke into the city, reached the square, but here they met stubborn resistance; Bagration brought a reserve into action and drove out the French, who, having left the city, scattered thick chains of chasseurs over the surrounding mountains and vineyards. From the heights, they noticed the numerical insignificance of the Russian detachment, went on the offensive, drove the Russians out of the city and began to bypass them with mountains on the right in order to cut off the retreat along the gorge. Bagration also covered himself with a dense chain of jaegers and dismounted Cossacks, sending to Rosenberg to ask for help.

Mikhail Miloradovich took out carts and rushed with Dendrygin grenadier battalion at a time when the French were flanking Bagration from the village of Germanedo. Being higher in rank than Bagration, he refused to accept command over the detachment, saying:

"There is no place to be considered ranks here."

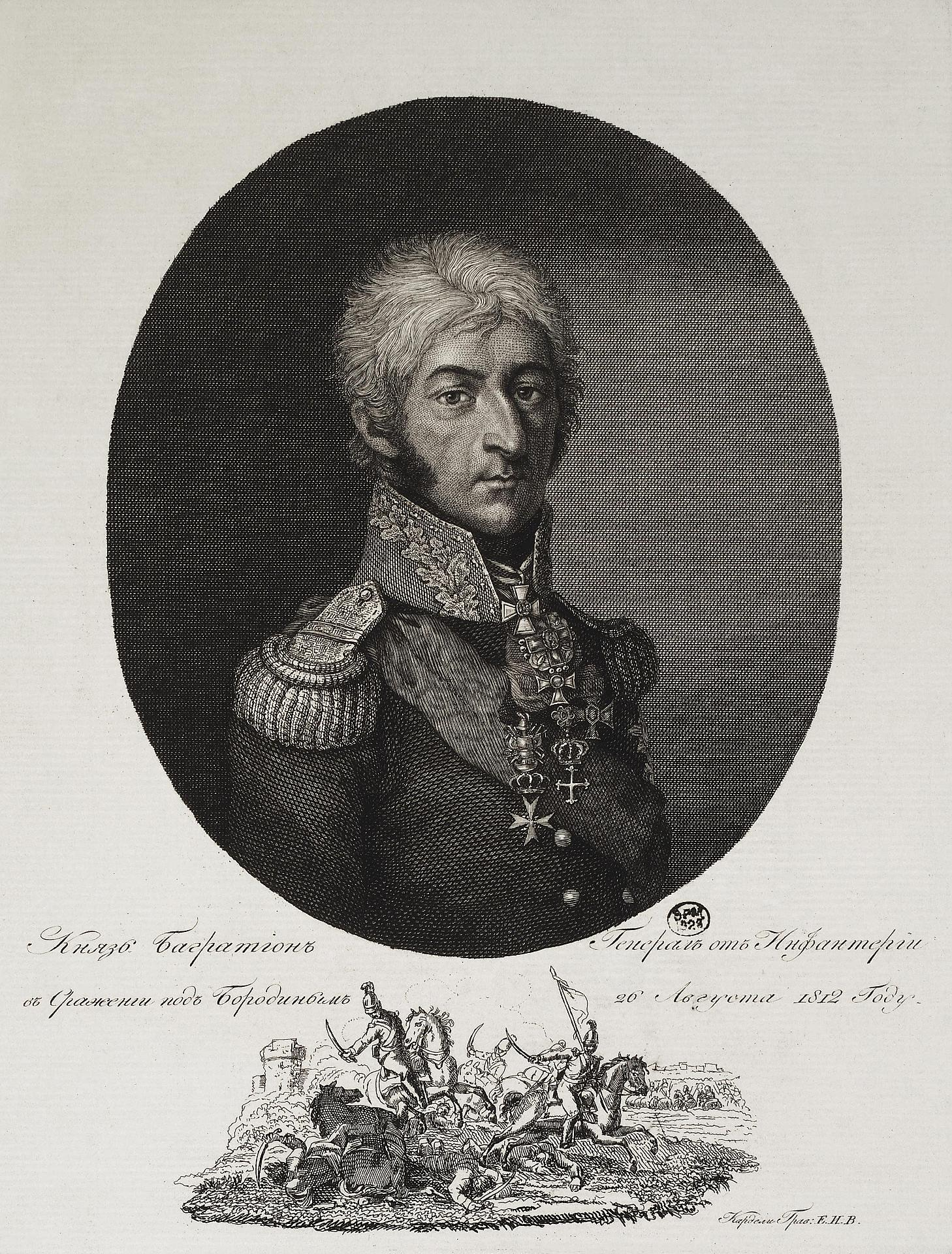
Pyotr Ivanovich Bagration

and left Bagration to finish the job, which he had begun so successfully. The arriving battalion stopped the detour movement of the French; soon 2 battalions approached with the head of the division, Povalo-Shveikovsky, and the city was again occupied by the Russians; the French cavalry, crashing into the Russian column, was slaughtered. Meanwhile, the French, standing on the right bank of the Adda, began to cross in boats between Olginate and Brivio, to the rear of the Russian troops. Due to the difficulty of moving along the gorge road, the Russian artillery was left under the cover of a battalion (Baranovsky); the artillery met the French troops, and General Shveikovsky himself rushed there; the French were overwhelmed. The battle lasted 12 hours, from 8 am to 8 pm. The French fought hard, but left 100 prisoners behind, the number of killed and wounded is unknown; the Russians lost 385 men KIA or WIA; Bagration was among the wounded. It was impossible to start the crossing on the same day. However, the Russians managed to seize the bridgehead, as well as the town of Lecco; although Alexander Mikaberidze notes that Bagration took the city, but did not "secure the crossing". If counting Lecco and Olginate–Brivio, then a total of 6 battalions and 4 squadrons (which belonged to Sérurier's division) were involved on the French side.

Meantime, Vukassovich approached Brivio, which was very weakly occupied, beginning to arrange a crossing, and therefore the Russians moved away from Lecco, settling down for the night between Lecco and Brivio. Waiting for a report on the outcome of the battle on the right flank, Suvorov postponed the crossing at San Gervasio until the night of April 27. In all, 4,993 Russians including approached reinforcements, and 5,000 French participated in this clash.

Eventually the French withdrew on rafts northwards from Lecco territory (night of 27–28 April), knowing that Adda had already been forced by the Allies elsewhere and that the road behind them would soon be cut off.

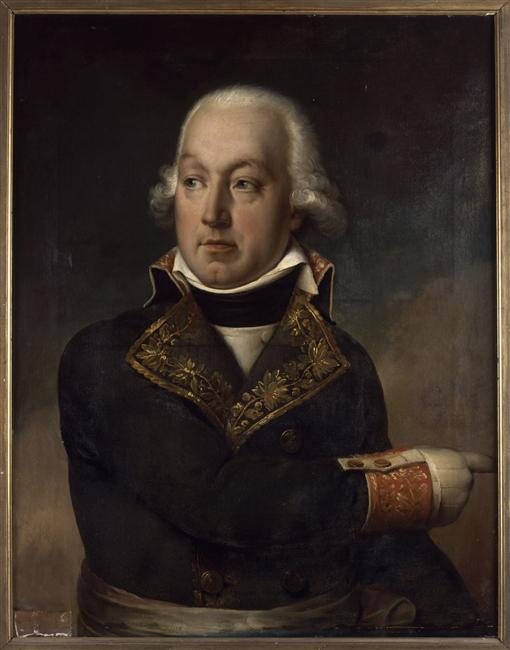
Barthélemy Louis Joseph Schérer

=== Vaprio & Cassano ===
On April 27, on orders from Paris, Schérer, completely out of his depth, handed over army command to the more capable MG Moreau. When news of the change in command reached Suvorov he remarked:

Here too I can see the hand of Providence. There would have been no great glory in fighting it out with a charlatan. But to beat Moreau — that would be something worth doing.

At midnight on 27 April, Ott began building a pontoon bridge at Trezzo. The point for crossing was very inconvenient from the theoretical point of view: the steepness of the bank made it difficult to launch the pontoons on the water; the winding, fast flow of the river and the rocky bottom prevented the convenience of the bridge; but the French did not pay attention to this inconvenient place (the 2nd Battalion of the 33rd Line Demi-Brigade, left by Sérurier at Trezzo, occupied the castle but had no posts on the bank itself), the night darkness covered the work, the river was not wide, so that only 7 pontoons were needed. The pontooner officer reported the impossibility of making a bridge at this place. Then Marquess Johann Gabriel Chasteler, chief of staff, who had already learnt Suvorov's notions of intransigence in overcoming obstacles, arrived at the crossing point and took decisive measures.

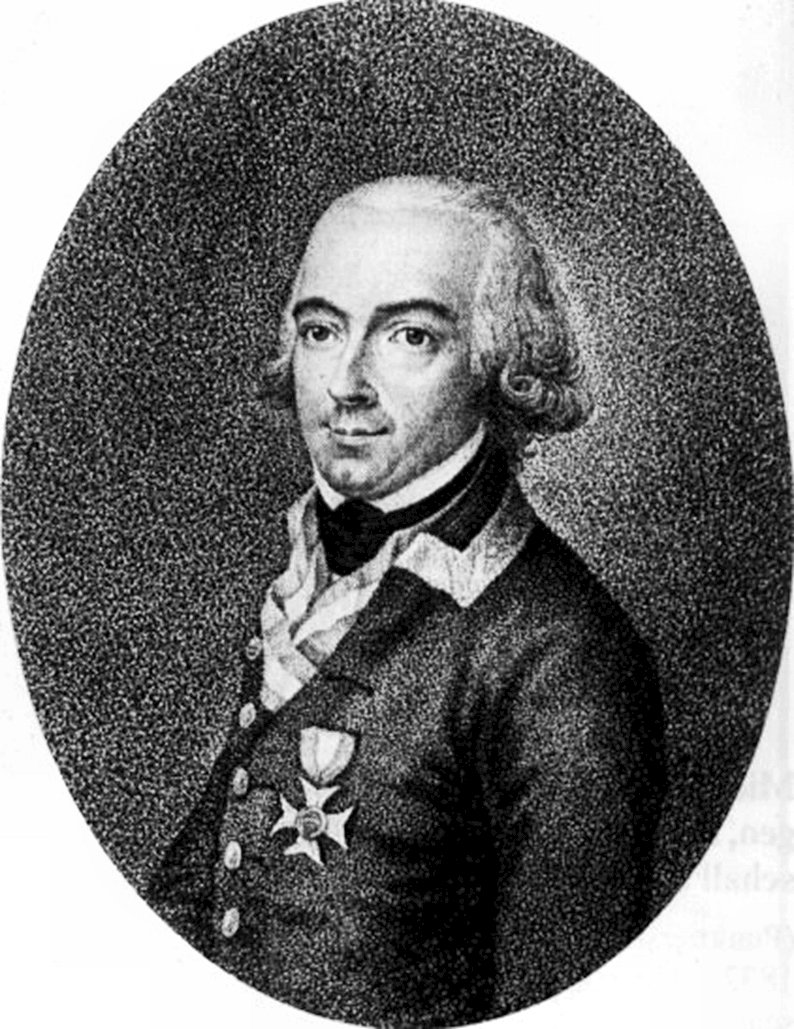
Johann Gabriel Josef Albert Chasteler de Courcelles

It was already tough for the French to rectify the situation: the Russians and Austrians surreptitiously pass through Adda in the centre of the French position near San Gervasio, in a places considered unsuitable for crossing. A number of jaegers and volunteers from Nádasdy battalion crossed by boat and occupied the right bank to secure the bridge. They started putting in pontoons; the work was done in perfect silence, and by daybreak the bridge was ready. Only in the morning did the French battalion notice its blunder, but it was too late: 6 companies of d'Aspré's jaegers and several Cossack sotnias crossed the bridge, followed by Ott's division, then Denisov, Molchanov, and Grekov Cossack regiments that arrived very quickly from Lecco; at last Zopf's division also moved. The Cossack regiment of Denisov overtook the French battalion from the rear; pursued by Ott's head battalions, it had barely time to retreat. Suvorov was at this point crossing the river with might and main across the Trezzo sull'Adda Bridge and its vicinity. At the same time Allied forces crossed at Brivio; but, nevertheless, Moreau gave orders for the immediate concentration of forces. Grenier and Victor were bringing troops from the south. General of the Cavalry Melas having the divisions of Fröhlich and Kaim would storm the French positions at Cassano in the afternoon: the eastern bank of the river was held by the French demi-brigade, to the aid of which Victor already rushed.

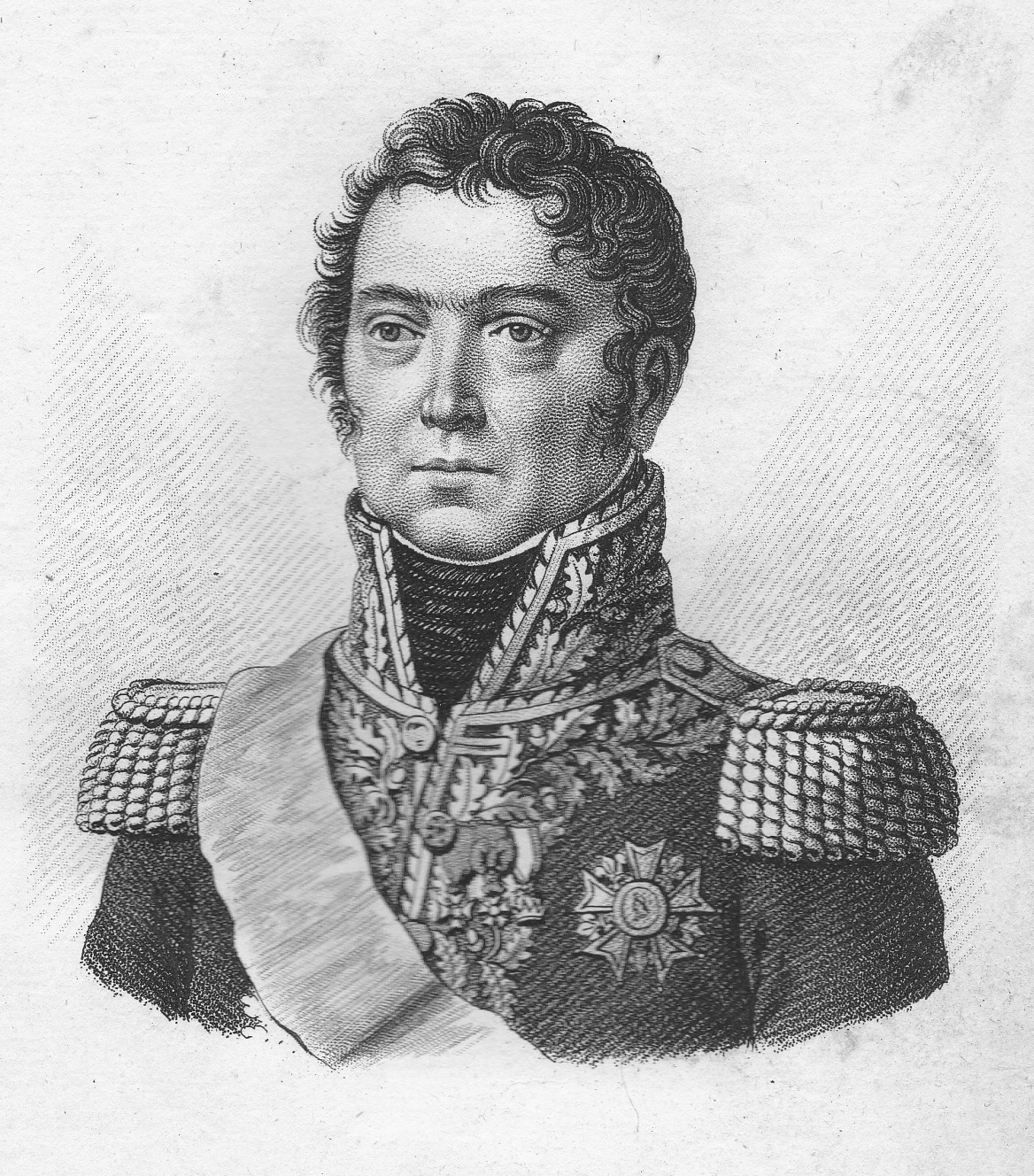
Paul Grenier

According to some archival documents, it can be assumed that Suvorov himself was at Vaprio and hurried the crossing. He was able to concentrate around 20,000 soldiers there, while Moreau concentrated 15,000; Moreau had no doubt that the main Coalition's attack was under way here; he rode to the battlefield and almost fell into the hands of the Cossacks, who had already reached Inzago. Grenier was ordered to take position between Vaprio and Pozzo d'Adda. Approaching Vaprio with 1 brigade, Grenier stopped Ott's advance, who had so far only 4 battalions, 4 squadrons and several Cossack sotnias. It was François Quesnel's brigade. The Allies attacked the French several times, but without success; the French held the excellent terrain for defence, as the village of Vaprio itself was very advantageous for the infantry. The neighborhood was close country and mostly planted with vines, while the highway from Milan had on either side high banks built up with stones collected from the fields, like a natural parapet. The French posted themselves behind it, whereas Grenier was approached by the 2nd brigade under Georges Kister; he had 9 battalions and 8 squadrons assembled and took the offensive. The French now had a strong numerical superiority. Grenier beat the Austrians out of their grip on Vaprio. He began to dislodge Ott's division from the front, threatening its right flank at the same time. Chasteler rushed to the aid with 2 battalions of Zopf's division and 2 squadrons, but even this support could not stop the French, and one of the approaching battalions (Stentsch) was mauled up by French cavalry. This is where Denisov's Cossacks (all three Cossack regiments under his command) and Austrian hussars charged from the left of the French and halted their advance; joining together, the Cossacks and hussars broke into the ranks of the French infantry, forcing it to retreat towards Pozzo. At this time the French were approaching from Milan by 24th Chasseurs à Cheval Regiment (under the direction of Nicolas Beker): the Cossacks attacked it, overturned, and pursued as far as Gorgonzola, capturing many prisoners.

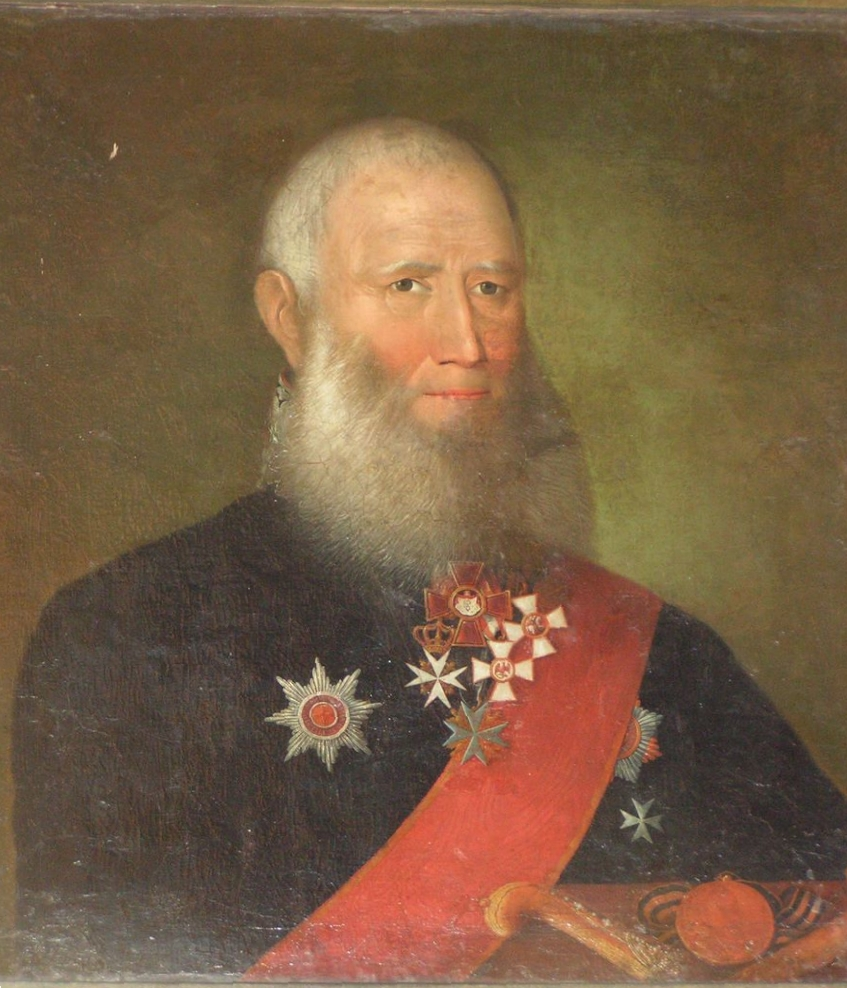
Adrian Karpovich Denisov

Ott and Zopf had broken through. Then, with the arrival of the rest of Zopf's battalions, the Austrian infantry of Ott and Zopf attacked the villages of Pozzo and Vaprio (6 km or 3.7 mi north from Cassano), which were the flanks of Grenier's division. Suvorov rode from one victorious unit to the next, urging the men on to final efforts. Discovering the 2nd battalion of the Austrian regiment of Esterházy resting at a halt, he called out:

Bayonets! On with the advance!

Colonel d'Aspré protested that the men had been on the march for fifty hours, and were totally spent, at which Suvorov answered:

Well, I still have my Russians — I know that they will be after the enemy!

After a fierce battle both villages were taken by the Austrian infantry. The combat of Vaprio was supervised directly by Suvorov himself. At the end there were about 11,000 Austrians and Cossacks versus 7,000 French. It cannot be said that the outcome of the combat of Vaprio could have been the only outcome: the timely arrival of Sérurier's 3,000, Victor's 6,000 (2,000 he could abandon in Cassano d'Adda on the way), would be 16,000 French, led by skilful Moreau, against 11,000 of the enemy. This situation of the combat at Vaprio can be explained by the vigorous frontal attack of Melas' troops at Cassano; probably, this attack was conducted with the purpose of contributing to the allied success at Vaprio or, after the capture of Cassano, to move to the Grenier's rear, or to divert part of the French troops from that battlefield. Perhaps the sluggishness of the morning Melas' actions allowed Moreau to leave in Cassano bridgehead only 106th demi-brigade, which shows at the same time Moreau's eyesight. The attack itself at Cassano after 4 o'clock in the afternoon was conducted by Melas' troops excellently: the preparation by fire of 30-gun battery is instructive, and then a decisive blow up to the occupation of the town of Cassano. Once the Austrians had secured the villages of Vaprio and Pozzo, Moreau, seeing that Victor was not approaching, and hearing the cannonade in the rear, from Cassano, orders Grenier to retreat and take a new position between Cassano and Inzago. However, it was too late. The pre-bridge fortification in front of Cassano was just under a high pressure. The French 106th demi-brigade of Jean Roussel, supported by a brigade of Victor's division (which arrived at 4 o'clock in the afternoon; under the command of Argod), held firmly behind the Retorto canal, which covered the front of their position for 5 hours. For most of the day Melas had contented himself with cannonading the French works until Suvorov pushed Melas to take decisive action.

Suvorov ordered Melas to capture Cassano at all costs. The Austrians placed 30 guns, built a bridge, rushed to assault the fortification and burst into it so quickly that the French had no time to destroy the bridge over the river and remove the guns while retreating to the right bank of the Adda. Argod was killed. It was Reisky regiment that went to the assault (1,911 men). The Austrians crossed the bridge and found themselves in the rear of the French retreating from Vaprio. The direct road to Milan via Gorgonzola was cut off, the French had to hasten their retreat to Melzo, and parts of Victor's division, which had not had time to join Grenier and Laboissière's troops, were ordered to withdraw to Melegnano. Suvorov's assault forced Moreau to a general retreat. After a continuous hard fighting from 6 a.m. to 6 p.m., both Allied columns were so fatigued that they could not pursue and stopped on the battlefield. The Cossacks followed the retreating French. The winners got 19 guns, a colour and over 2,000 POW with very heavy loss of KIA and WIA among the French; the allies lost over 1,000 men. Reporting to Emperor Paul, Suvorov especially "praised the excellent courage of Don Cossacks", calling their Ataman Denisov "brave warrior". Thus by the evening of April 27 the fate of the battle on the Adda River was decided and the way to Milan was opened. At the same time Vukassovich succeeded in bringing down the enemy at Brivio (it was a small French outpost), and at night passed to the right bank of the Adda; the French barely managed to retreat to Lake Como, and Soyez, still occupying Lecco, seeing that the Russian troops were approaching again, rushed into the mountains and barely escaped, having crossed Como in vessels.

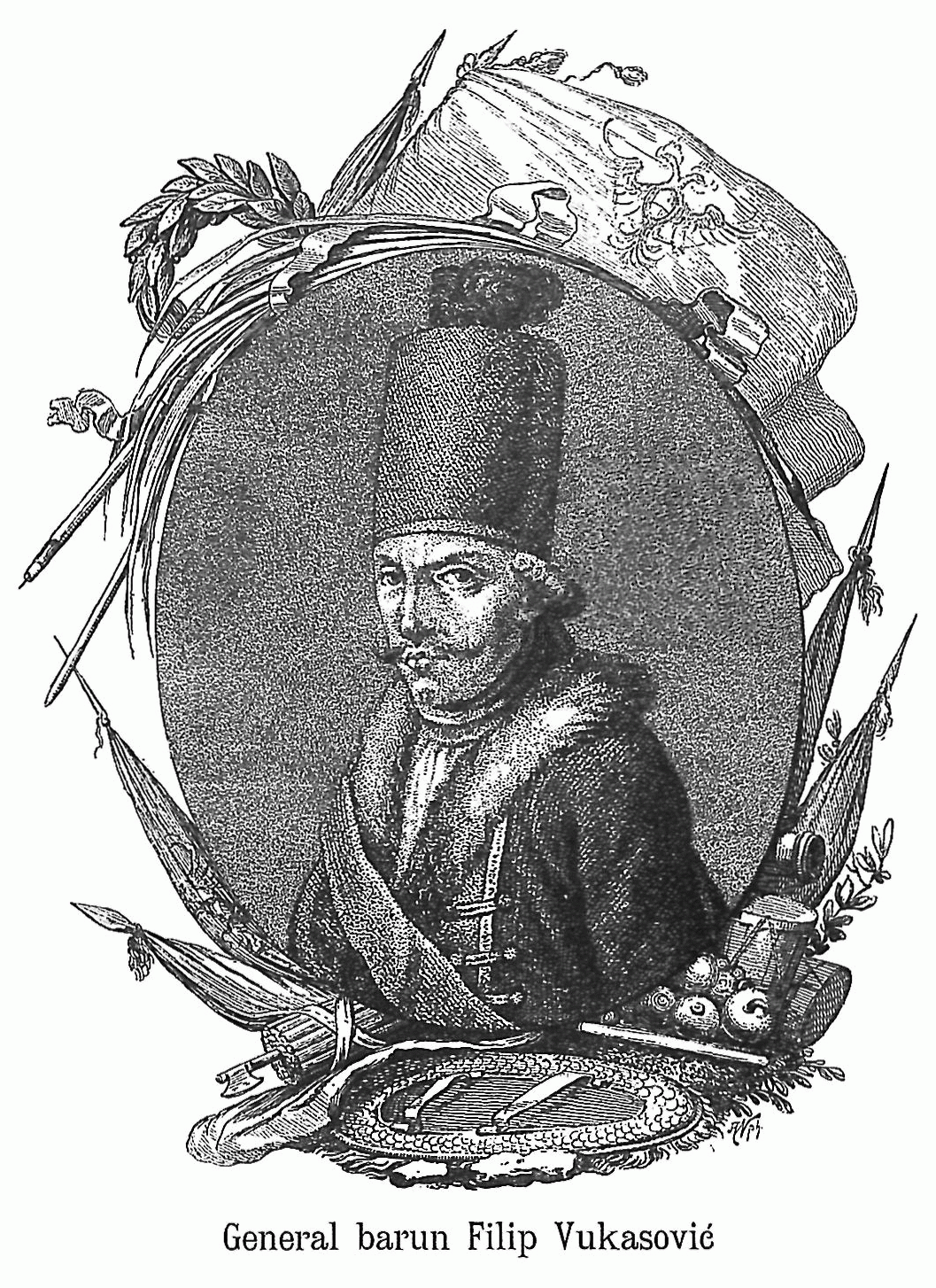
Josef Philipp Vukassovich

=== Verderio ===
Sérurier, exactly following Moreau's orders, halted between Verderio and Paderno d'Adda (he was standing with his back to the Adda), carefully entrenched himself, and remained all the day of the 27th and the night of the 28th of April, awaiting further orders, cut off by Ott from the south and Vukassovich from the north; meanwhile on both sides, at Vaprio and Brivio, the cannonade rang out, and a fierce fight was going on. The fight was over. Moreau retreated, the allies slept on the field of battle; Sérurier remained unnoticed. On the early morning of 28 April, an advance detachment of one battalion of Austrians under Louis Victor Meriadec de Rohan-Guéméné and Pozdneev Cossack regiment met a cavalry post on the hill behind Imbersago; Cossacks, advancing toward Paderno, overturned this post and unexpectedly saw a whole detachment of French. Vukassovich, considering it encircled, offered to lay down his arms, but, having received a refusal, led an attack. Rohan advance battalion and Cossacks drove the French out of Paderno, and with the rest of the force Vukassovich bypassed Verderio and attacked the enemy from the rear. The French stubbornly defended at Verderio and even unsuccessfully attempted to attack the enemy on the flank, repelling the unsupported hussars, but the French ran out of ammunition, Austrian attack in several columns (a favourite tactic since 1758) by superior numbers convinced Sérurier of the carelessness of the defense, and seeing the approach of Rosenberg's main Russian troops (a mere 17,000 coalition forces), Sérurier decided that further resistance would be reckless and surrendered. Vukassovich trapped 3,000 men at Verderio.

The Adda battle on maps

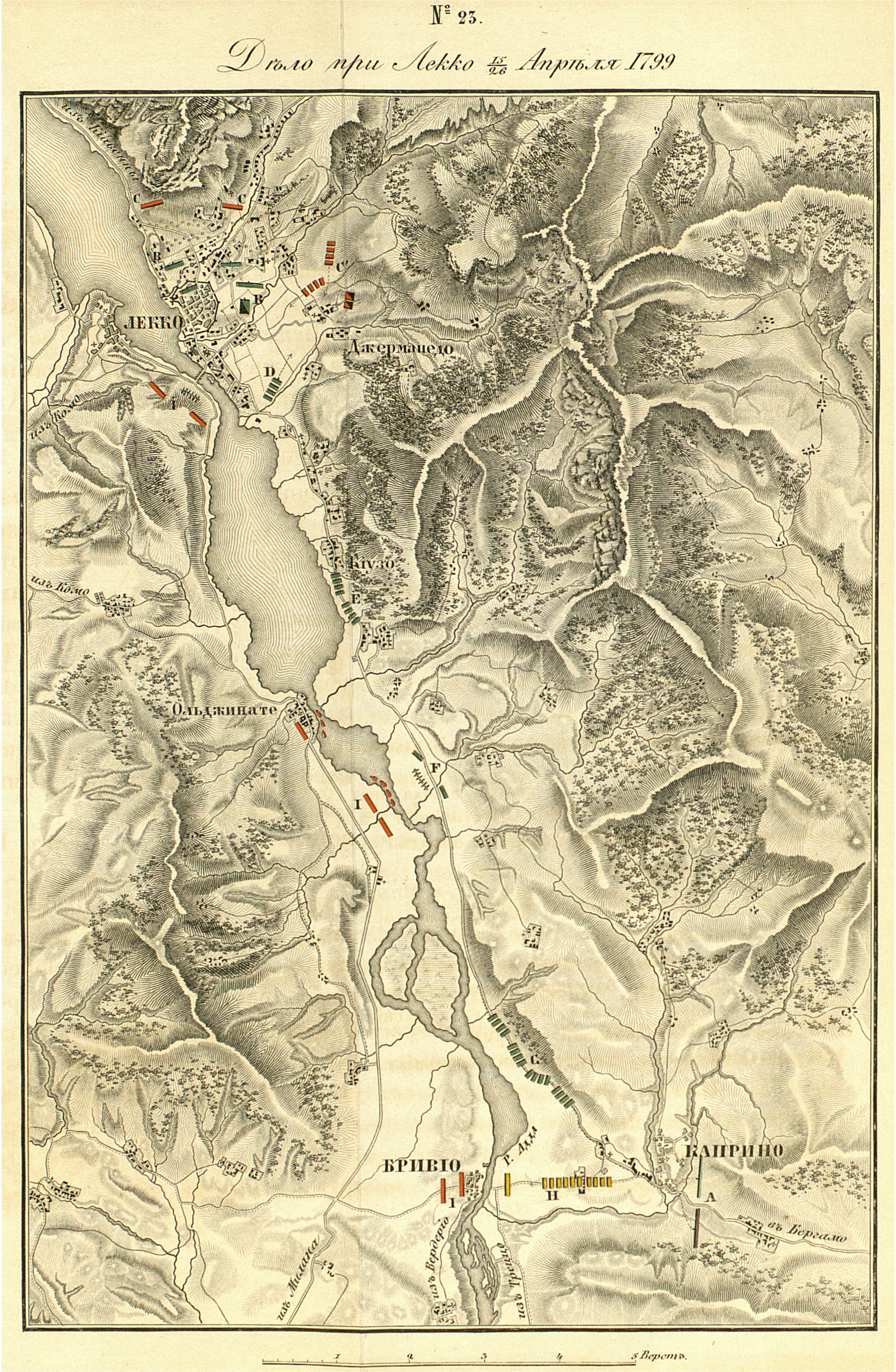
Combat of Lecco
A – Shveikovsky and Vukassovich on the night of 25–26 April
B – Bagration upon the occupation of Lecco
C – Soyez's detachment retreating from Lecco
C' – A French column, sent to bypass Bagration
D – Dendrygin's battalion, which arrived with Miloradovich
E – 2 battalions of Rosenberg's and Baranovsky's regiments, who arrived with Shveikovsky
F – Russian artillery left under cover of Baranovsky's battalion
G – The main column of Russians on the move towards Lecco
H – Vukassovich on the move to Brivio
I – French posts protecting the crossings
In all, approx. 5,000 French and approx. 19,000 allies (4,993 allies engaged).

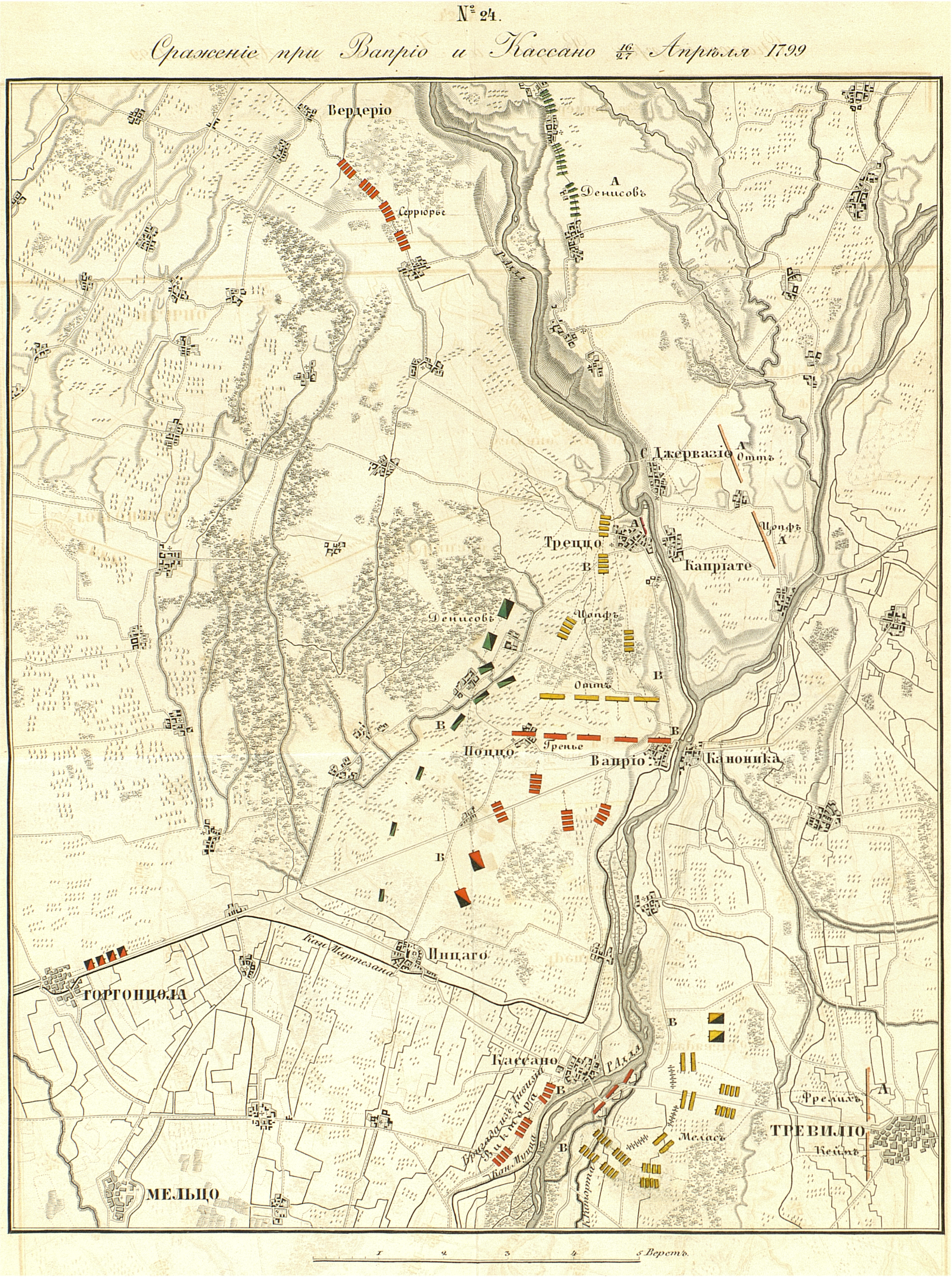
Combats of Vaprio and Cassano
A – The initial Allied position from the evening of 26 April
B – The troops' position at the battle itself on 27 April
In all, approx. 10,500 French and approx. 24,500 allies.

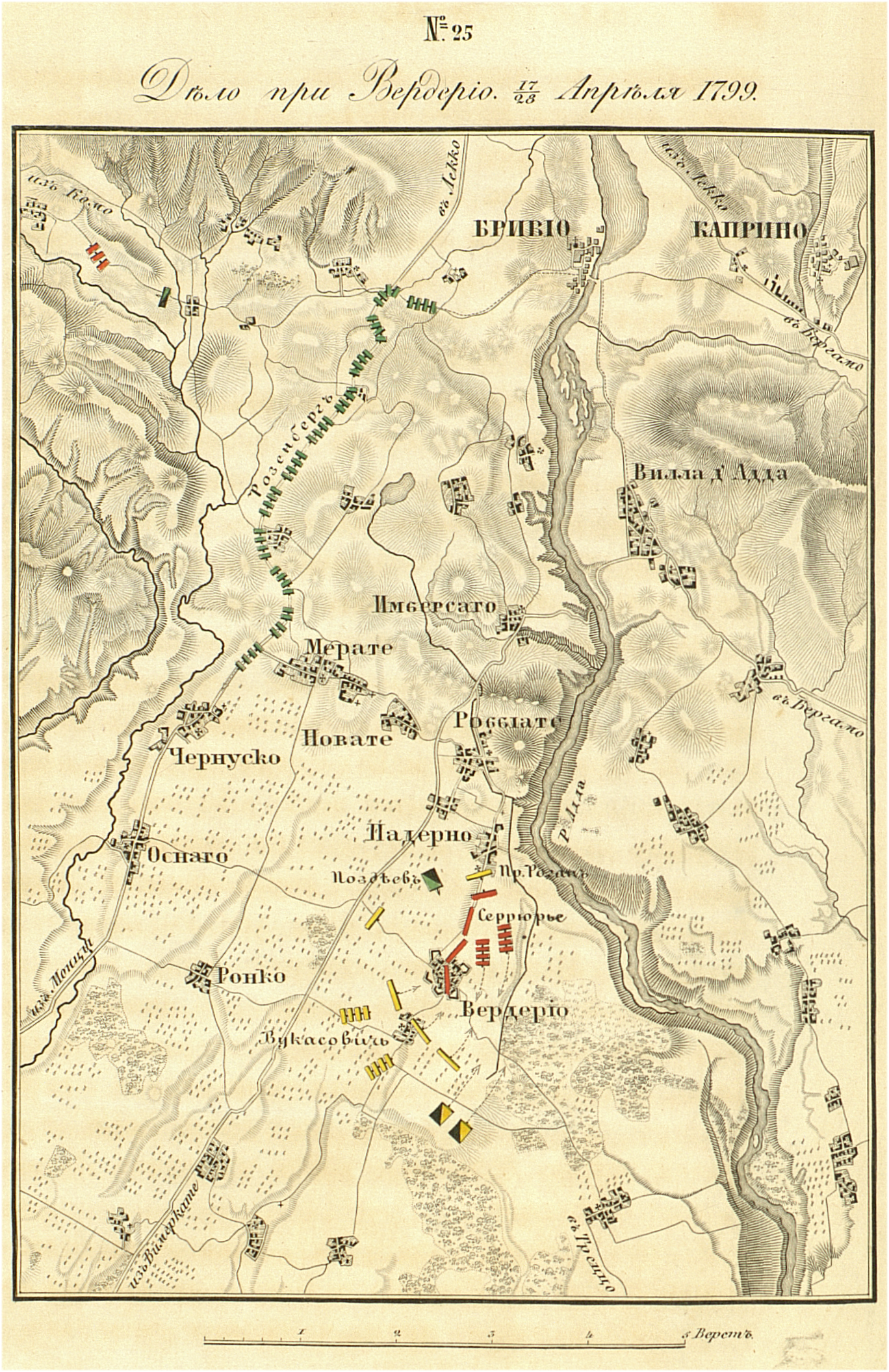
Combat of Verderio
no identification marks required
In all, approx. 3,000 French and approx. 17,000 allies (7,470 allies engaged).

== Results ==
Soon after the coalition's victory, Suvorov wrote to a Russian diplomat:

"The Adda is a Rubicon, and we crossed it over the bodies of our enemies."

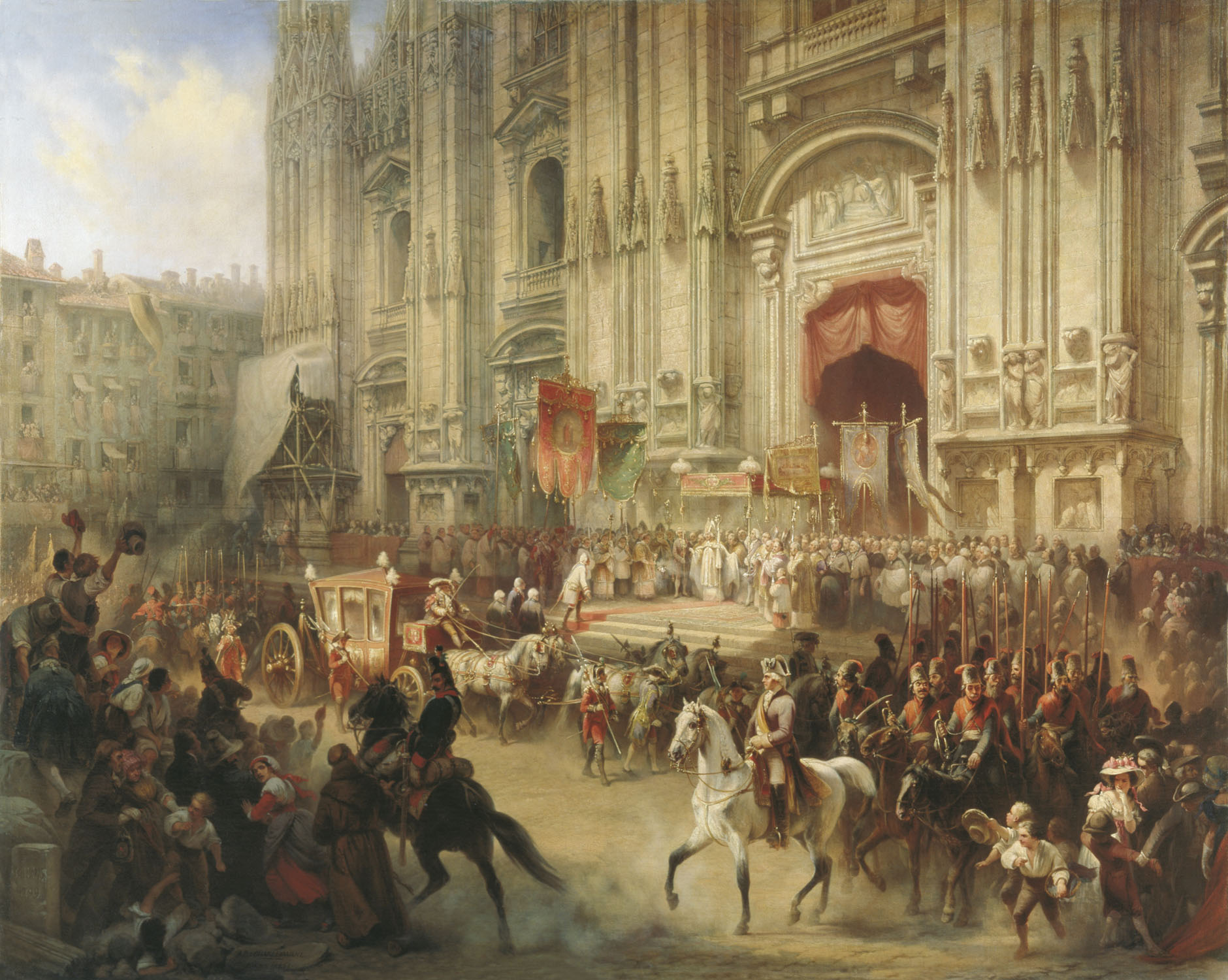
Marshal Suvorov in Milan, painting by Adolf Charlemagne

In the combats at Lecco, Vaprio, Cassano, and Verderio the French brought into the fray between 18,000 and 18,500 men; they suffered 2,500 killed and wounded, plus 5,000 soldiers, 27 cannon, and 3 colours captured. Losses at Verderio were 300 killed and wounded, plus 2,700 captured. The Austro-Russians lost 2,000 killed and wounded (or 2,500). Another authority gives allied losses as 6,000 and French prisoners as 7,000, without listing French killed and wounded. Perhaps the author included the losses at Verderio in his total. Bodart estimated French losses at 11,000. Another source claims 6,200 Allied losses (Austrians: 3,800 killed and wounded and 1,200 prisoners of war, Russians: 1,200). The figure of 3,800 KIA and WIA almost identical with Carl von Clausewitz's data of around 3,700 Austrians killed and wounded. Clausewitz stated that the numbers of French and Austrians killed and wounded were roughly the same. He does not cited Russian losses and assesses 7,000 French prisoners of war.

Moreau retreated, leaving a 2,400-man garrison in Milan's citadel. Grenier's division withdrew to Novara while Victor and Laboissière pulled back to Valenza. Kaim pressed on to capture Turin on 20 June. Milan's citadel capitulated on 24 May. The bottom line of this battle was that the Republic of France-created Cisalpine Republic was now back in the hands of the Habsburg monarchy.

The next battle for the Allied Field Army would be the unsuccessful Battle of Bassignana on 12 May, and then Suvorov's forces would strike back at the First Battle of Marengo (Battle of San Giuliano) just 4 days later.

The next major action was the Battle of the Trebbia on 17–20 June.

== See also ==
- Capture of Brescia
- Battle of Bassignana
- First Battle of Marengo
- Battle of Modena
- Battle of the Trebbia
- Second Battle of Marengo
- Battle of Novi
- Battle of the Gotthard Pass
- Battle of the Klöntal
- Battle of the Muotatal

== Sources ==
- Clausewitz, Carl von (2020). Napoleon Absent, Coalition Ascendant: The 1799 Campaign in Italy and Switzerland, Volume 1. Translated by Murray, Nicholas; Pringle, Christopher. Lawrence, Kansas: University Press of Kansas. ISBN 978-0-7006-3025-7.
  - Clausewitz, Carl von (1833). Die Feldzüge von 1799 in Italien und der Schweiz (in German). Vol. 1. University of Lausanne: F. Dümmler.
- Clodfelter, M. (2017). Warfare and Armed Conflicts: A Statistical Encyclopedia of Casualty and Other Figures, 1492-2015 (4th ed.). Jefferson, North Carolina: McFarland. ISBN 978-0-7864-7470-7.
- Eggenberger, David (1985). An Encyclopedia of Battles: Accounts of Over 1,560 Battles from 1479 B.C. to the Present. New York: Dover Publications. ISBN 0-486-24913-1.
- Smith, Digby (1998). The Napoleonic Wars Data Book. London: Greenhill. ISBN 1-85367-276-9.
- Duffy, Christopher (1999). Eagles over the Alps: Suvorov in Italy and Switzerland, 1799. Chicago, Ill.: Emperor's Press. ISBN 1-883476-18-6. OCLC 42694091.
- Dupuy, Trevor N.; Dupuy, R. Ernest (April 1, 1993). The Harper Encyclopedia of Military History (4th ed.). New York: HarperCollins. ISBN 978-0004701431.
- Mikaberidze, Alexander (2003). The Lion of the Russian Army. Florida State University.
- Acerbi, Enrico (2007a). "The 1799 Campaign in Italy: The Battle of Lecco (April 25 to 27, 1799). The Position of the Coalition's Army before the Battle". The Napoleon Series. The Waterloo Association.
  - Acerbi, Enrico (2007b). "The 1799 Campaign in Italy: the Combats of Trezzo and Vaprio (April 26)". The Napoleon Series. The Waterloo Association.
    - Acerbi, Enrico (2007c). "The 1799 Campaign in Italy: the Combat of Cassano and the Verderio Affair (April 27)". The Napoleon Series. The Waterloo Association.
- Latimer, Jon (December 1999). "War of the Second Coalition". Military History: 62–69.
- Bodart, Gaston (1908). Militär-historisches Kriegs-Lexikon (1618-1905) (in German). Vienna and Leipzig: C. W. Stern.
- Anonymus (1800). Feldzüge der Oesterreicher und Russen in Italien im Jahre 1799 (in German). Leipzig: Verlag Reinicke und Hinrichs. p. 75.
- Milyutin, Dmitry (1852). История войны России с Францией в царствование Императора Павла I в 1799 году [The history of Russia's war with France during the reign of Emperor Paul I in 1799] (in Russian). Vol. I. St. Petersburg: Типография штаба военно-учебных заведений.
- Orlov, Nikolay Aleksandrovich (1892). Разбор военных действий Суворова в Италии в 1799 году [Analysis of Suvorov's military actions in Italy in 1799] (in Russian). St. Petersburg: Тип. Тренке и Фюсно. ISBN 9785998994289.
- Petrushevsky, Alexander F. (1885). "XX. Война в Италии; Адда, Милан" [The war in Italy; Adda, Milan]. Рассказы про Суворова [Stories about Suvorov] (in Russian). St. Petersburg: Типография М. М. Стасюлевича.
  - Petrushevsky, Alexander F. (1900). "Итальянская кампания; Адда, Милан; 1799" [The Italian campaign; Adda, Milan]. Generalissimo Prince Suvorov (in Russian). St. Petersburg: Типография М. М. Стасюлевича.
- Novitsky, Vasily; Schwarz, Alexey; Apushkin, Vladimir; Schulz, Gustav (1911). Military Encyclopedia (in Russian). Vol. I: А – Алжирия. Moscow: Тип. Т-ва И. Д. Сытина.
- Vasilyev, N. M. (2016). "ИТАЛЬЯНСКИЙ ПОХОД 1799". Great Russian Encyclopedia. Electronic version.

Preceded by Battle of Magnano	French Revolution: Revolutionary campaigns Battle of Cassano (1799)	Succeeded by Battle of Bassignana
