= Sanctuary of Madonna del Bosco, Imbersago =

Sanctuary church in Lombardy, Italy

Santuario della Madonna del Bosco
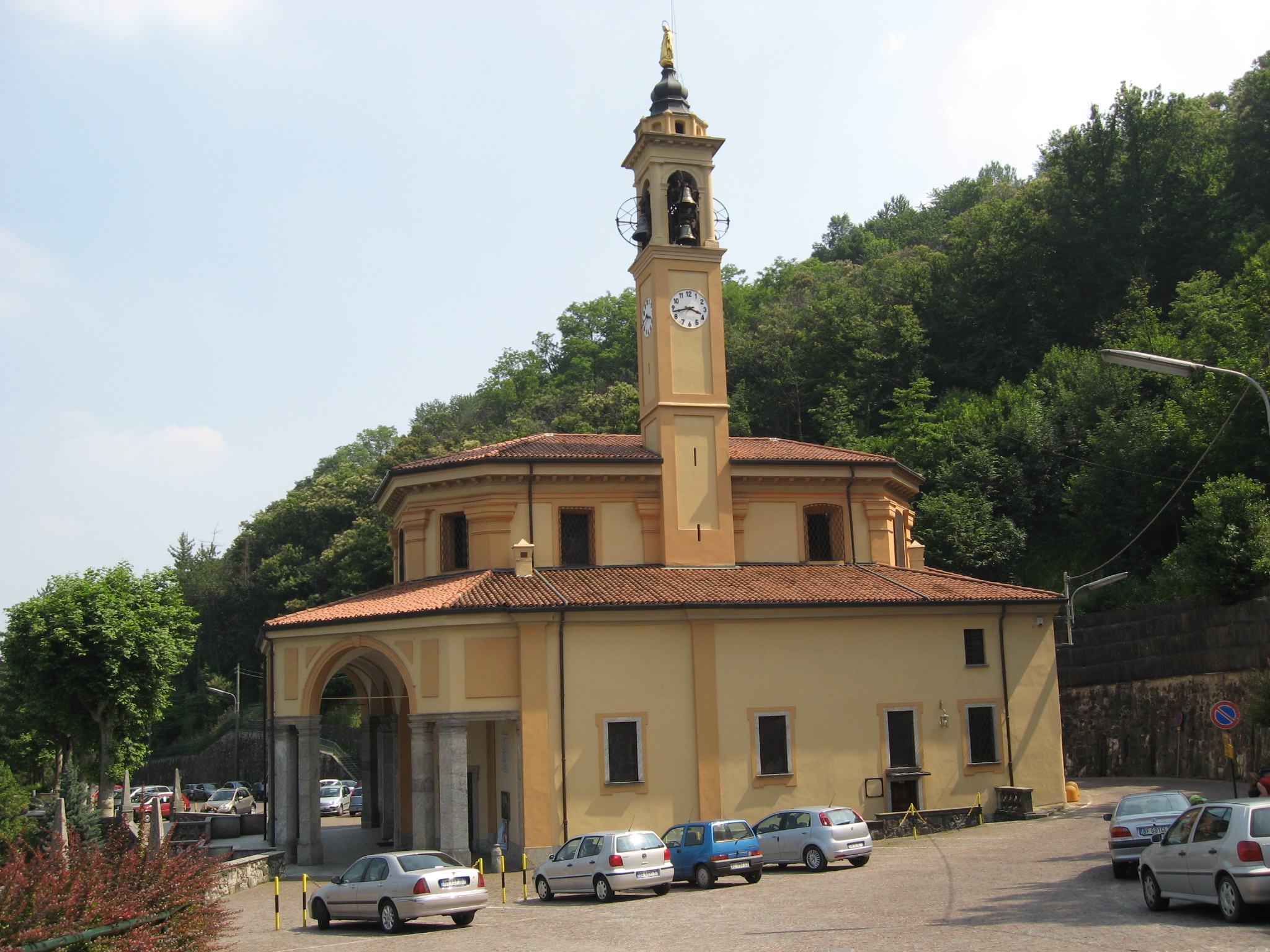

Religion
- Affiliation: Roman Catholic
- Province: Lecco
- Status: Active

Location
- Location: Imbersago, Italy
- Interactive map of Santuario della Madonna del Bosco
- Coordinates: 45.71405°N 9.44264°E

Architecture
- Type: Church

The Sanctuary of the Madonna del Bosco (Our Lady of the Forest) is a Roman Catholic sanctuary church outside of Imbersago, province of Lecco, region of Lombardy, Italy.

== History ==
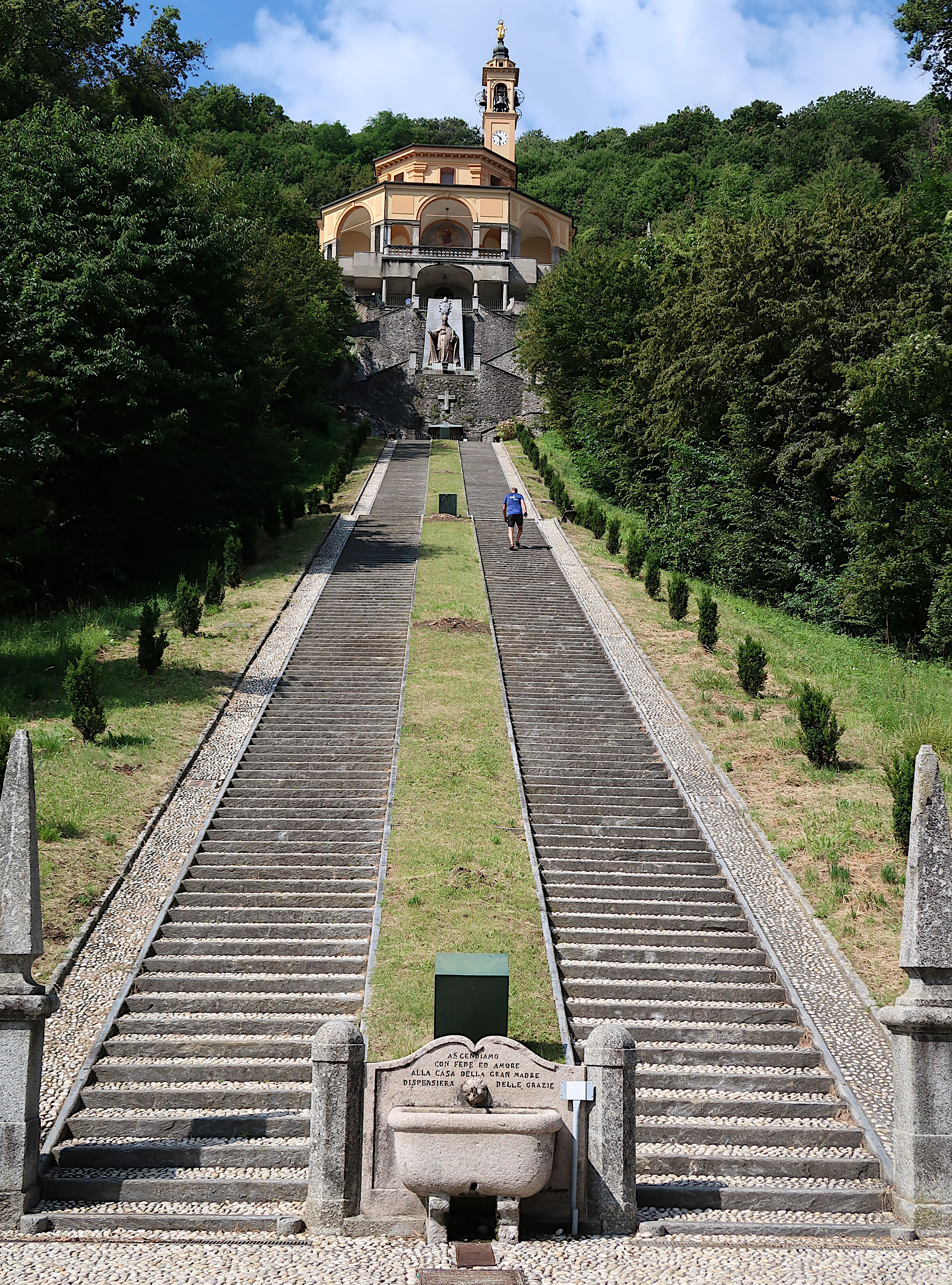
The Scala Santa

The church was built between 1641 and 1644 by the architect Carlo Buzzi. Tradition holds that at the site, a mother whose child was being attacked by wolves, called to the Virgin, who appeared and saved the child from the wolf-attack. In the 20th century, Pope John XXIII named it a Minor Basilica.

The layout is octagonal, typical of 15th-century Marian shrines in Lombardy. The complex was enlarged in 1677 and 1888. The interior has a three lobed nave with a presbytery with a balustrade.

The main altarpiece is a depiction of the Madonna and Child above a grove of Chestnut trees (1888). In the left nave is an altarpiece depicting a Pietà, attributed to the studio of the Campi family. The prayers of the faithful led to a collection of 112 tablets of ex voto. These works were studied by Natale Perego who, among other things, discovered that in the period 1862-1878 there was a single artist dedicated only to their painting.

The sanctuary can be accessed via the 392 steps of the Scala Santa. Most are linear steps until the end with a scenic sweep of two arms. At the top is a modern bronze statue of Pope John XXIII by Enrico Manfrini. Below the belvedere, is a crypt with a stucco depiction of the founding miracle.

The current management of the sanctuary is entrusted to the Oblate Fathers of the Istituto Sant'Ambrogio of Milan, who inherited it from previous chaplains in 1898. The rector is Father Giulio Binaghi. In the shrine, the religious services are celebrated according to the Ambrosian rite.

== Famous visits ==
The rumors circulating about the sanctuary were so enthusiastic that, on 12 October 1795, even Filippo Maria Visconti wanted to visit it.

At the end of the 19th century, the spiritual assistant was Luigi Maria Marelli, later destined to be bishop of Bergamo. His presence is also due to the devotion later shown by Pope Roncalli.

Cardinal Alfredo Ildefonso Schuster also came to Imbersago four times.

=== Pope John XXIII ===
Since childhood, Angelo Giuseppe Roncalli visited the sanctuary. During the seminary in Bergamo, for two years he came on pilgrimage on foot.

On 29 August 1954 he held the ceremony in which the statue of the Madonna was solemnly crowned and on the anniversaries of this event continued his visits. The last one dates back to 24 August 1958, shortly before the conclave elected him pope. One of his first acts as pontiff was to raise the sanctuary to the level of a Minor Basilica, by assigning it the blessed candle. A second blessed candle was dedicated to Saint Joseph.

His visits were often accompanied by the celebration of Mass.

In 1960 he asked Cardinal Giovanni Battista Montini (future Pope Paul VI) to lay a gold necklace and gems on the statue of Our Lady.

== Sanctuary of Madonna del Bosco and the media ==
Emilio De Marchi set to Imbersago his work Giacomo l'idealista and mentioned the sanctuary providing a fairly accurate description. Luigi Santucci also spoke about it in his book Brianza and other loves.

The film by Ermanno Olmi E venne un uomo, focused on the figure of Pope John XXIII, was shot in part at Imbersago, and to be precise in the area of Garavesa and at the shrine.
