= Capture of Bergamo =

Part of the Italian and Swiss Expedition of 1799

- Part of the Italian and Swiss expedition of 1799
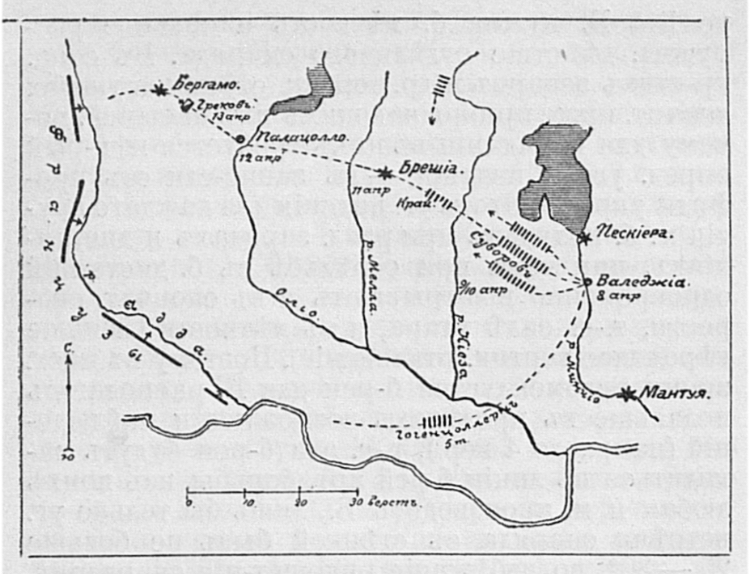
- Campaign around Brescia 1799, map in Sytin Military Encyclopedia; Bergamo is on the top left
Date	24 April [O.S. 13 April] 1799
Location	Bergamo (incl. Visconti Citadel), Northern Italy
Result	Russian victory

Belligerents
Russian Empire	French First Republic

Commanders and leaders
(Russian Empire) Pyotr Bagration (Note: Did not participate directly in the attack) (Russian Empire) Pyotr Grekov (Russian Empire) Adrian Denisov	(French First Republic) Barthélemy Schérer

Units involved
Bagration's Advance Guard: Grekov Don Cossack regiment; Part of Denisov Don Cossack regiment	Bergamo Garrison

Casualties and losses
Unknown	Up to 130 men captured; 1 standard captured; 19 cannons captured

The capture of Bergamo (Note: (Russian: Взятие Бергамо, romanized: Vzyatie Bergamo; French: Prise De Bergame)) took place 24 April 1799 during Suvorov's Italian campaign as part of War of the Second Coalition, when 2 Don Cossack regiments of Prince Bagration's vanguard under the command of Colonel Grekov and Ataman Denisov quickly and unexpectedly attacked the town of Bergamo occupied by the French garrison and seized Citadel of Bergamo. The attack proved successful for the Russians. The French army was led by Barthélemy Schérer.

== Action development ==
Before the main forces of Bagration's vanguard crossed the Oglio River, Grekov, with his Cossack regiment and part of Denisov regiment, was sent to pursue the French rearguard retreating from Palazzolo sull'Oglio to Bergamo. He consisted of 150 men and carried 6 guns, as well as his position was on a steep hill. Grekov personally led the soldiers to attack in a heavy battle, Denisov arrived at the end of the skirmish, describing his actions, he notes the heroism shown by Grekov and Cossacks:

I hastened up with my regiment, and saw that just beyond the wood there was a walled town where the last regiment of French was engaged with the Grekov regiment—hence the shooting and the cries. I was at first taken aback by this unexpected encounter, but I ordered my regiment to divide in two, and gallop around the town yelling, so as to alarm the enemy still further. I myself hastened to the town, where I found the Grekov regiment rushing at the enemy like lions and skewering them with their lances as they crowded into the streets. The most useful thing I could do was to join the heroic Grekov, and encourage the Cossacks by crying out: "Keep on, dear comrades, keep on!" It seemed that for every Cossack in pursuit there were one hundred French who were being hunted down, for only one of my regiments was in action. The French did not even think of turning about, but instead fled through the town from one end to the other, and erupted from the far side.

The Cossacks victory this clash and rushed in pursuit and entered the town (fortified and crowded) suddenly and unexpectedly, that's why the French offered no resistance to the Cossacks. When citadel seized, the Cossacks captured 130 prisoners, 19 siege guns, 1 standard, many weapons, and military supplies at Bergamo. Suvorov was very pleased with the successful operation. Despite the rain and mud, he arrived in Bergamo and congratulated Grekov and Denisov on their victory. The capture of the fortress allowed the main troops to reach the Adda River, where the c. 27,000–28,000 of Schérer's army was defeated in the ensuing battles of Lecco and Cassano (26–28 April). This battle cost the French a 6,900–7,500 casualties, incl. 5,000 captured. Allied casualties range from 2,000 to 4,886, incl. c. 1,000 captured. Participants in the operation to capture Bergamo also took part in it.

== Sources ==
- Orlov, Nikolay Aleksandrovich (1892). Разбор военных действий Суворова в Италии в 1799 году [Analysis of Suvorov's military actions in Italy in 1799] (PDF) (in Russian). St. Petersburg: Тип. Тренке и Фюсно.
- Milyutin, Dmitry (1852). История войны России с Францией в царствование Императора Павла I в 1799 году [The history of Russia's war with France during the reign of Emperor Paul I in 1799] (in Russian). Vol. 1. St. Petersburg: Типография штаба военно-учебных заведений.
- Petrushevsky, Alexander (1884). "Итальянская кампания: Адда; 1799" [Italian Campaign: Adda; 1799]. Генералиссимус князь Суворов [Generalissimo Prince Suvorov] (in Russian). Vol. 3 (1st ed.). Saint Petersburg: Типография М. М. Стасюлевича.
- Duffy, Christopher (1999). Eagles over the Alps. Suvorov in Italy and Switzerland, 1799. Original artwork by Bill Younghusband (1 ed.). Chicago: The Emperor's Press. ISBN 1-883476-18-6.
- Schwartz, Alexey; Apushkin, Vladimir; Schoultz, Gustav; Velichko, Konstantin I. (1912). Греков 8-й, Петр Матвеевич [Grekov 8th, Pyotr Matveevich]. In Novitsky, Vasily (ed.). Sytin Military Encyclopedia (in Russian). Vol. 8: Гимры – Двигатели судовые. Moscow: Типография Т-ва И. Д. Сытина. pp. 467–468.
