= Robbiate =

Robbiate Rubiàa (Lombard)
- Comune
- Comune di Robbiate
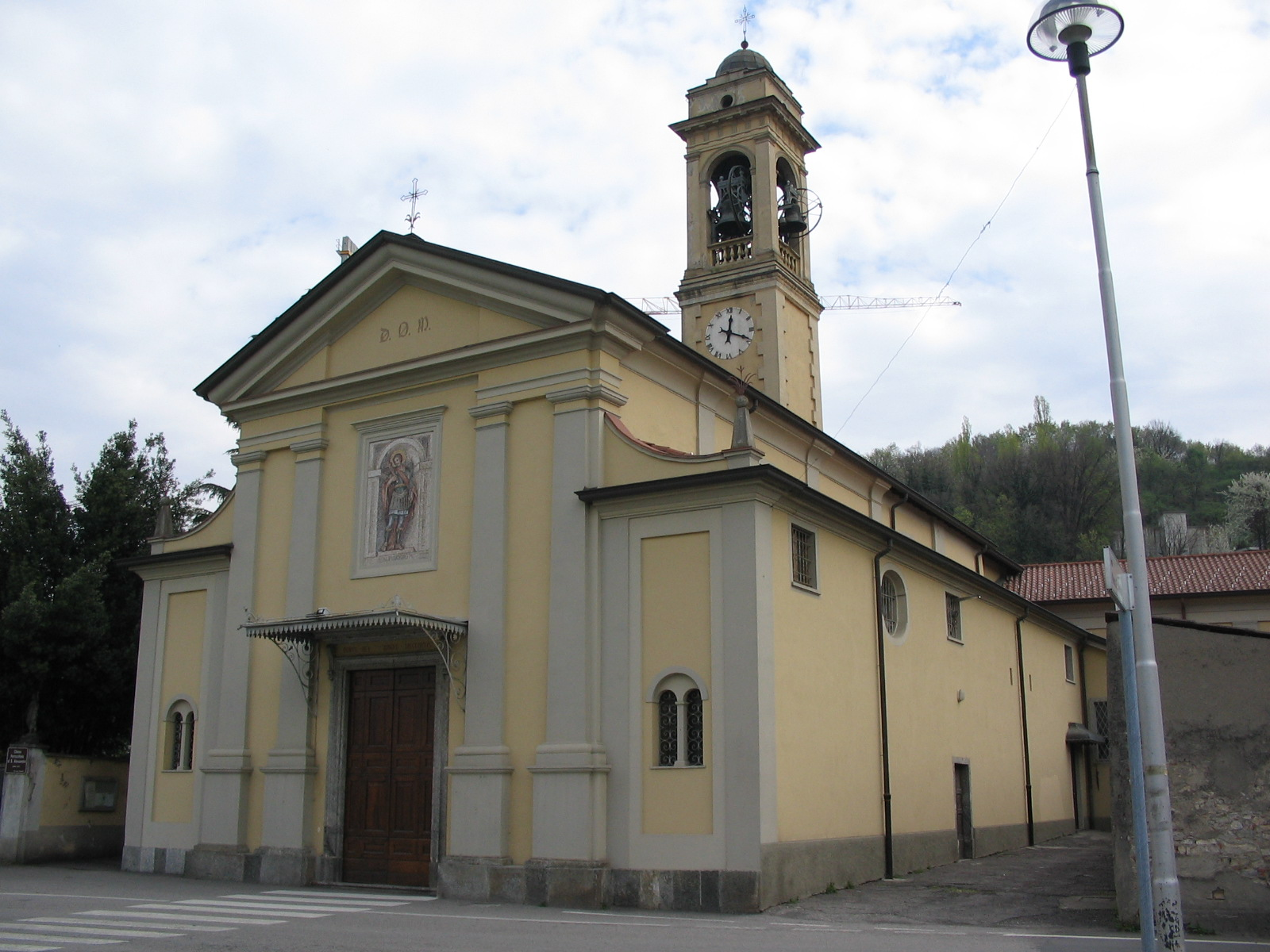

- Coat of arms

- Location within Italy Location within Lombardy
- Coordinates: 45°41′N 9°26′E
- Country: Italy
- Region: Lombardy
- Province: Province of Lecco (LC)

Area
  - Total: 4.7 km^{2} (1.8 sq mi)

Population (Dec. 2004)
  - Total: 5,333
  - Density: 1,100/km^{2} (2,900/sq mi)
- Demonym: Robbiatesi
- Time zone: UTC+1 (CET)
  - Summer (DST): UTC+2 (CEST)
- Postal code: 23899
- Dialing code: 039
- Website: Official website

Robbiate (Brianzöö: Rubiàa) is a comune (municipality) in the Province of Lecco in the Italian region Lombardy, located about 30 kilometres (19 mi) northeast of Milan and about 20 kilometres (12 mi) south of Lecco. As of 31 December 2004, it had a population of 5,333 and an area of 4.7 square kilometres (1.8 mi^{2}).

Robbiate borders the following municipalities: Calusco d'Adda, Imbersago, Merate, Paderno d'Adda, Ronco Briantino, Verderio Inferiore, Verderio Superiore, Villa d'Adda.

== History ==
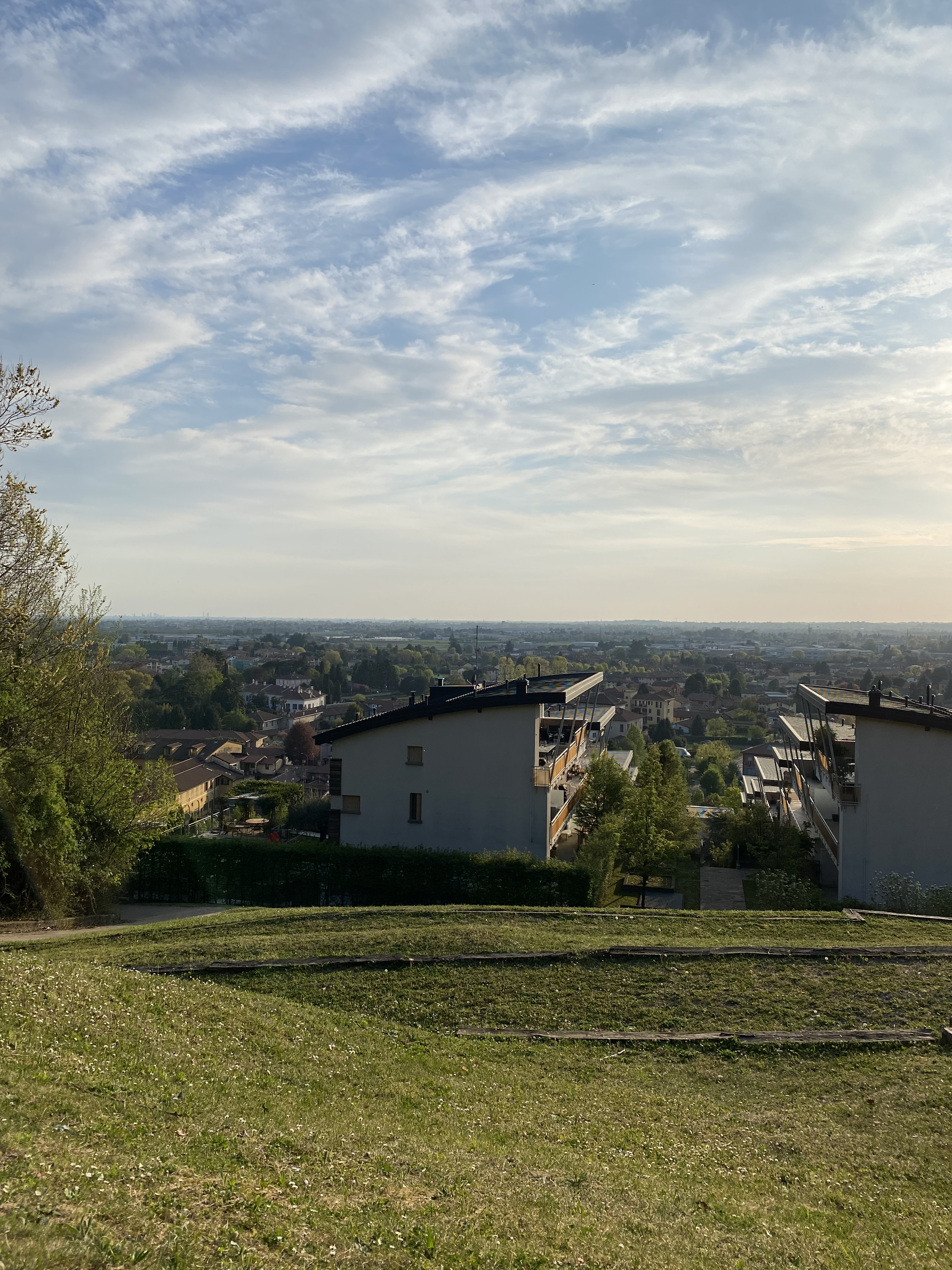
The view from Mount Robbio in Robbiate

The history of Robbiate may have ancient origins, dating back to pre-Roman times. The name Robbiate is first mentioned in 966. Being a small provincial town, its destiny has always been connected with the fate of various peoples that dominated in a given historical period, in particular the Franks and Lombards.

In the Middle Ages, Robbiate was a fiefdom, either under the direct control of the nobility or under the control of church authorities.

In the 13th century, it became part of the Duchy of Milan and followed its fate under French and Spanish rule until the end of the 18th century, when it became part of the Kingdom of Lombardo-Veneto.

After the Risorgimento and the outbreak of the wars of independence, Robbiate became part of the Kingdom of Italy, in the province of Como, district of Lecco, and consequently in the Republic of Italy in the province of Como. Since 1992 Robbiate is a town in the province of Lecco.

== Origins of the name ==
The origins of the municipality's name are not certain, but there are several hypotheses:

- Like many other toponyms of Brianza, Robbiate refers to the group of municipalities containing the adjectival suffix -ate of Latin origin, which usually indicates belonging to a person or geographic element. The German philologist Gerhard Rohlfs argued that the name may have been derived from the Latin nomen gentilicium of Rubius with the addition of the suffix -ate.
- According to Italian philologist Dante Olivieri, the etymon may have originated from the name of the hill under which the municipality stands, Mount Robbio, which may have the meaning of "red mountain" due to the red colour of the clay soil (rubeus, in Latin).
- Another version of an Italian cartographer Attilio Zuccagni-Orlandini and a philologist Francesco Cherubini is the etymology may have dated back to the Orobians, an ancient pre-Roman population that settled in the area between the Ticino and Oglio rivers.

However, there are no remains or documents attesting to the Orobic or Roman presence.

== Demographic evolution ==
Historical population

Year	Pop.	±%
1861	1,310	—
1871	1,333	+1.8%
1881	1,290	−3.2%
1901	1,565	+21.3%
1911	1,804	+15.3%

Year	Pop.	±%
1921	1,838	+1.9%
1931	1,933	+5.2%
1936	1,955	+1.1%
1951	2,398	+22.7%
1961	2,590	+8.0%

Year	Pop.	±%
1971	3,102	+19.8%
1981	4,219	+36.0%
1991	4,574	+8.4%
2001	4,961	+8.5%

Source: Data from ISTAT
