= Verderio =

Verderio Verdé (Lombard)
- Comune
- Comune di Verderio
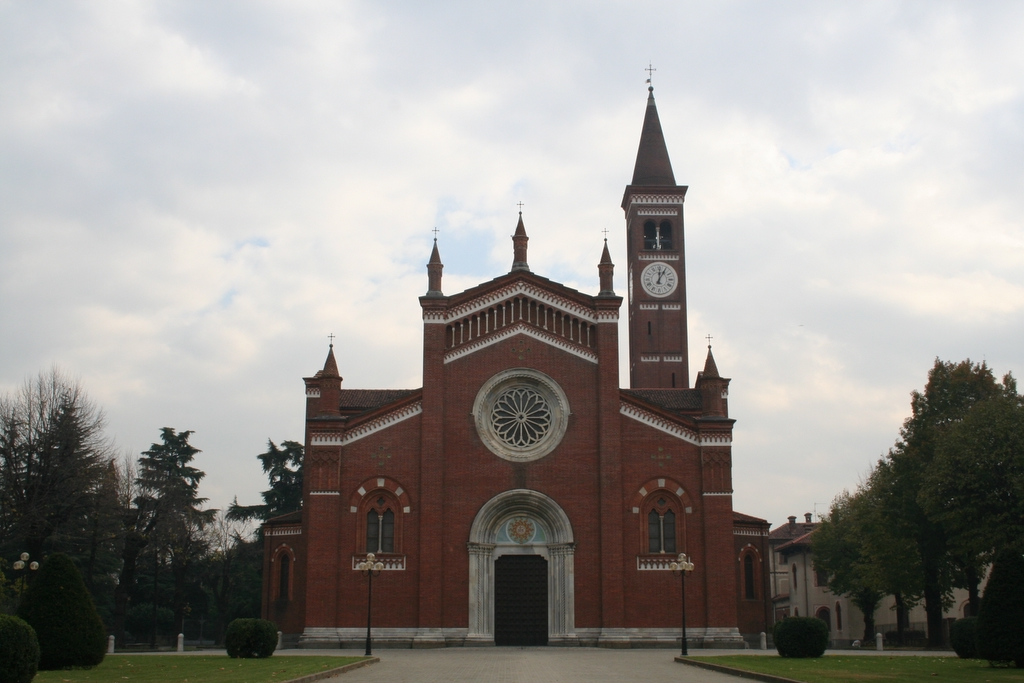
- Church of Santi Giuseppe e Floriano in Verderio Superiore.

- Coat of arms

- Location within Italy Location within Lombardy
- Coordinates: 45°40′00″N 9°27′00″E
- Country: Italy
- Region: Lombardy
- Province: Province of Lecco (LC)
- Frazioni: Verderio Superiore, Verderio Inferiore

Government
  - Mayor: Robertino Manega

Area
  - Total: 5 km^{2} (1.9 sq mi)
- Elevation ISTAT: 250 m (820 ft)

Population (31 December 2019)
  - Total: 5,610
  - Density: 1,100/km^{2} (2,900/sq mi)
- Time zone: UTC+1 (CET)
  - Summer (DST): UTC+2 (CEST)
- Postal code: 23879
- Dialing code: 039
- ISTAT code: 097091
- Website: Official website

Verderio (Brianzöö: Verdé) is a comune in the province of Lecco, in Lombardy, northern Italy. It was formed in 2014 from the comuni of Verderio Superiore and Verderio Inferiore.

Formerly, the "upper" and "lower" Verderio were divided in two Comuni from the preexisting Verderio in 1905.

== History ==
The name Verderio probably comes from the Latin “viridarium”, which means “garden”. Other traces of the Roman civilization come from the archeological findings and from the etymology of some of the toponyms of its surroundings: for example Vicus Mercati (Vimercate), Hiberna Regis (Bernareggio), Caesarea Novella (Sernovella, a former Verderio Superiore's fraction) and Miliarium Tertium (Terzuolo, a fraction of Robbiate). In this territory the Romans – led by the consul Marcus Claudius Marcellus – defeated Insubres in an important battle in 222 b.C.

Other findings confirm, after the fall of the Roman Empire, the presence of the Lombards and then of the Franks: Villa Gallavresi, once head office of Verderio Inferiore municipality, was built on the ruins of a fortification built by the Franks in the 10th century.

Between the 12th and 14th centuries, Verderio saw the presence of the Templars, that had two important sites at Castel Negrino (now part of Aicurzio's municipality, but once included in Verderio's territory) and at Cascina Brugarola. In 1312 all of Templars' belongings were passed to the Order of Knights of Malta, after the suppression of the Order of Templars decided by Philip IV of France.

An important historical event was, on 28 April 1799, the Combat of Verderio as part of the Battle of Cassano between the Austro-Russians led by general Josef Philipp Vukassovich (under the overall leadership of Alexander Suvorov) and the cut-off French troops led by general Sérurier, who commanded a division in Moreau's army. This happened when Napoleon was in Egypt for his military campaign in the Northafrican country. Despite having suffered heavy losses, the Austro-Russian troops forced the French to surrender. The winners were acclaimed as liberators but shortly after they started plundering, burning and vandalizing the town. Today, two headstones commemorate that tragic event.

The origins of Verderio's division in the two comuni of Verderio Inferiore and Verderio Superiore is disputed: according to some historians, it dates back to the 12th century, according to others, to the suppression of the Templar's order. What is certain is that in some documents of 1412 the wording “Verderio de sora e de sotto” (“upper and lower Verderio”) can be found. A temporary unification in one comune is mentioned in some documents of 1874.

A unified parish for Verderio was established by bishop Charles Borromeo after the Council of Trent, following his pastoral visits in 1571 and 1583. This parish would nonetheless be divided in 1778, when the bishop's vicar established the parish of Verderio Inferiore and the construction of the church dedicated to Saints martyrs Nazarius and Celsus started. In 1906 this church would be replaced by a new one built on the same site following a project by architect Giovanni Barboglio; the frescoes that decorate the interior were painted in 1932 by Umberto Marigliani, helped by Vittorio Manini.

Two referendums for the reunification of the two comuni were held in recent times (in 1994 and in 2004) since they already shared many services like the elementary school, the library and the sports hall. Both referendums had a negative outcome: for the referendum to be approved, a majority of “yes” was needed in both Verderio Inferiore and Verderio Superiore; while the former always voted in favour of the unification, the latter blocked the process on both occasions with its negative response. A new referendum was held on 1 December 2013; this time, the majority of both comuni voted in favour of the restoration of a unified Verderio. On 4 February 2014 the municipality was reconstituted by the regional council of Lombardy from the fusion of Verderio Inferiore and Verderio Superiore. The first municipal elections took place on 25 May 2014.

== Sport ==
The local amateur football team is Associazione Sportiva Dilettantistica Verderio (AS Verderio for short), currently playing in the Prima Categoria, the seventh level of the Italian football league system. Their home field is Robbiate's municipal sports centre.
