= Imbersago =

Imbersago Imbersàch (Lombard)
- Comune
- Comune di Imbersago
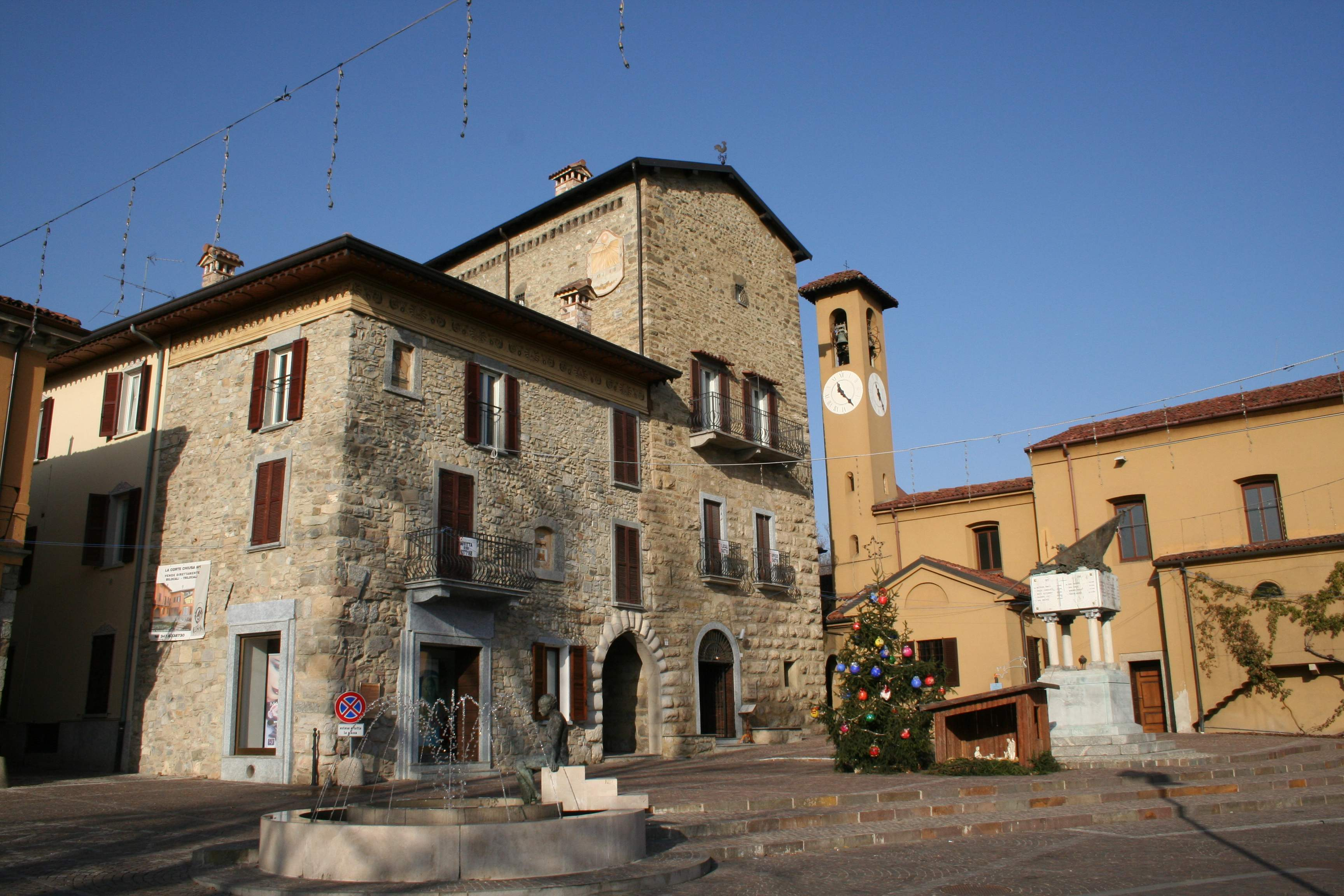
- Main square of Imbersago, dedicated to Giuseppe Garibaldi

- Coat of arms

- Location within Italy Location within Lombardy
- Coordinates: 45°42′N 9°27′E
- Country: Italy
- Region: Lombardy
- Province: Lecco (LC)

Government
  - Mayor: Giovanni Ghislandi

Area
  - Total: 3.1 km^{2} (1.2 sq mi)
- Elevation: 249 m (817 ft)

Population (31 December 2010)
  - Total: 2,431
  - Density: 780/km^{2} (2,000/sq mi)
- Demonym: Imbersaghesi
- Time zone: UTC+1 (CET)
  - Summer (DST): UTC+2 (CEST)
- Postal code: 23898
- Dialing code: 039
- Website: Official website

Imbersago (Brianzöö: Imbersàch) is a comune (municipality) in the Province of Lecco in the Italian region Lombardy, located in the Brianza traditional area about 35 kilometres (22 mi) northeast of Milan and about 15 kilometres (9 mi) south of Lecco.

Imbersago is situated on the Adda River and borders the following municipalities: Calco, Merate, Robbiate, Villa d'Adda.

== History ==
There are no known archaeological finds for the Imbersago area. In the surrounding area, however, human frequentations are known starting from the Middle Paleolithic. In the area the Celts took over the pile-dwelling settlements, subjected in turn by the Romans.

The medieval history of Imbersago sees the town lined up in favor of the Guelphs, and as a point of contact between the area of Milan and the Republic of Venice.

== Society ==
=== Languages and dialects ===
In addition to the Italian language, in Imbersago is also used the local Brianza dialect, a variant of the Lombard language. Like all western Lombard dialects, local Brianza dialect is also substantially a Romance language derived from Latin.

Currently, the use of this dialect is slowly regressing, although to a lesser extent than other Lombard dialects, especially those spoken in the cities.

=== Religion ===
Most of the population, as in all of Italy, belongs to the Catholic Church, and belongs to the three churches located in the parish: the church of San Marcellino, the church of San Paolo, and the Sanctuary of Madonna del Bosco. All three churches belong to the Archdiocese of Milan and follow the Ambrosian rite.

== Culture ==
=== Imbersago in literature ===
In Manzoni's masterpiece I promessi sposi, the lovers escape from Milan by crossing the Adda in Imbersago. Emilio De Marchi set his work Giacomo l’idealista in Imbersago, and could not help but mention the Sanctuary providing a fairly accurate description. A film of the same name was made from the book in 1948, directed by Alberto Lattuada and interpreted by Marina Berti. Luigi Santucci also talked about it in his book Brianza ed altri amori. Ermanno Olmi's film E venne un uomo, centered on the figure of Pope Giovanni XXIII, was shot in part in Imbersago, and to be precise in the Garavesa area and at the Sanctuary.

== Main sights ==
- Santi Marcellino e Pietro, main church of town
- Sanctuary of Madonna del Bosco, 17th century Marian shrine
- The Leonardo's ferry, connecting Imbersago to Villa d'Adda. It takes its name from the Florentine artist and inventor, who studied a similar project during his service under Ludovico il Moro, lord of Milan, and who sojourned at Vaprio d'Adda in 1506–07.
- Torre Bellavista, a medieval watchtower (14th century)
- San Paolo -church in town center with 16th-century altarpiece

== Twin towns ==
- Pont-Évêque, France, since 2003
