= Adrian Karpovich Denisov =

Russian lieutenant general (1763–1841)

Ataman Adrian Karpovich Denisov
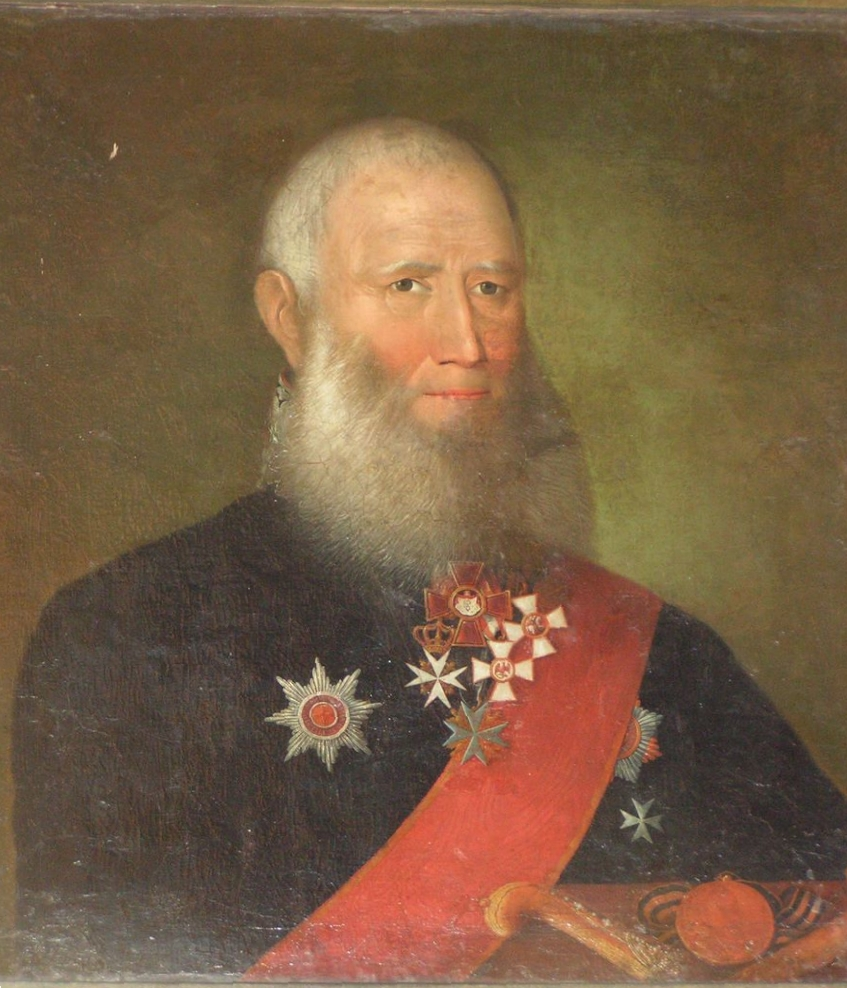
- Adrian Denisov (unknown artist)
- Born: 1763
- Died: 1841 (aged 77–78)
- Other name: Andrian
- Relatives: Denisov family
- Military career
- Allegiance: Russia
- Branch: Imperial Russian Army: Don Cossack Host
- Service years: 1776–1821
- Rank: Lieutenant general
- Conflicts: Tree-like list: Russo-Turkish War (1787–1792); Storming of Izmail; Battle of Maçin; Polish–Russian War of 1792; Battle of Zieleńce; Kościuszko Uprising (1794); Action of Lipovoye Pole; Battle of Maciejowice; Battle of Praga; Persian expedition of 1796; Suvorov's expedition; Capture of Bergamo; Battle of the Adda River; Combat of Lecco; Battle of Cassano; Battle of San Giuliano; Battle of Novi; Battle of the Muottental; Indian March of Paul; War of the Fourth Coalition; Battle of Guttstadt-Deppen; Battle of Heilsberg; Russo-Turkish War (1806–1812)
- Awards: Orders of: Sts. George (4th class), Vladimir (2nd class); Pour le Mérite; Sts. John of Jerusalem, Anna (1st class). Golden Weapon for Bravery

Adrian Karpovich Denisov (Russian: Адриа́н Ка́рпович Дени́сов; 1763–1841) was a Russian lieutenant-general, a remarkable representative of the Don Host, and an associate of Suvorov.

== Biography ==
In 1776 he began his military service. He was promoted to the rank of an officer in 1780. In 1787, he was given authority to command a regiment.

In 1789, he participated in the war with the Turks for the first time where he exhibited outstanding bravery—leading to his promotion as prime-major. In 1790, he was at the storming of Izmail at the head of the dismounted Cossacks. Despite the contusions, he was able to capture the battery. This feat gained him an award called the Order of St. George, in 4th degree. In June 1791, his successful actions at Maçin brought him a gold medal award with a portrait of Empress Catherine II.

In 1792, Denisov was a part of the army of General-in-Chief Kakhovsky in Poland. He was actively participating in the actions at the village of Morachwa, the Valowka, Lyubor, Zieleńce, Horodnica, where he was awarded once again with the Order of St. Vladimir, 4th degree.

In 1794, he was again in Poland, but in an encounter at Słonim he was wounded in the neck and arm by a sabre. Denisov survived and received the Prussian Order of Pour le Mérite for another action on 26 June at Lipovoye Pole, where the Polish detachment of Colonel Dobiek was defeated. In the battle of 31 July near Warsaw, Denisov was again wounded by a bullet. On 10 October, he took part in the battle of Maciejowice, in which, commanding Cossack regiments, completely defeated the Polish cavalry, crashed into the infantry and pursued his fleeing enemy until Kościuszko was taken prisoner. For the storming of Praga, he was awarded a golden sabre with the inscription "For bravery".

In 1796, Denisov went as a volunteer to the Caucasus to V. A. Zubov's army.

In 1798, he was part of the vanguard of the Russian corps with 6 Cossack regiments sent to Italy. On 24 April, together with Colonel Grekov, they broke into the fortress of Bergamo with the Cossacks, captured the city and the citadel, taking more than 100 prisoners and capturing 19 siege guns, many rifles and military supplies. Then, Denisov participated in the affair at Lecco, in the battle on the river Adda, where he crushed the French with a flank attack and rescued the Austrians surrounded by the enemy. For the battle of Marengo, he was awarded the Order of St. John of Jerusalem with a pension of 1,000 rubles a year. All June and July 1799 Denisov was with Suvorov and participated in the battle of Novi, for which he was awarded the Order of St. Anna 2nd Class with diamonds. Further, together with Suvorov, Denisov made the crossing of the Alps, where in the battle of the Muottental, he was the first to snuck in from the left flank of his enemy through the mountains covered with woods, and at a great distance without stopping chased the French. He was awarded the Order of St. Anna 1st Class.

In 1801, in view of the proposed campaign to India, Denisov was appointed chief of the Cossack corps. Having formed 11 regiments, Denisov crossed the Volga with them, but, reaching the Irgiz river, received news of the death of Emperor Paul I and the order to return to the Don.

In 1805, Denisov took the post of ataman. In 1807, at his own request, he was appointed to the active army in Prussia, where he took command of 3 regiments and participated in the battles of Guttstadt, Passarg, Semersfeld, Arensdorf and Heilsberg. He was awarded a golden sabre decorated with diamonds, with the inscription "For bravery".

In 1808–09, he took part in the war with Turkey.

In 1812, he formed 26 Cossack regiments for the army. He encouraged in every possible way the population of the Don Region to donate money, and in this he was awarded the Order of St. Vladimir, 2nd degree, and the rank of lieutenant-general.

In 1818, after Platov's death, Denisov was appointed army ataman on the Don. As an honest warrior who loved the Cossacks ardently, he did not remain indifferent to the arbitrary distribution of Cossack lands to persons close to the authorities, and conceived the idea of giving the host administration a new organisation. In 1819 he asked the Supreme Command for the establishment of a committee to draw up "Regulations on the organisation of the Don Host". This aroused against Denisov the discontent of the Don aristocracy, which saw in the committee's activities an encroachment on its privileges. The discontented began to cluster around a member of the committee, Adjutant-General Chernyshyov, relations between Denisov and Chernyshyov became hostile, and all this ended with Denisov's disgrace.

In January 1821 he was unexpectedly dismissed, put under the police supervision, and his property has been seized. Denisov left behind him notes printed in Russkaia Starina 1874–75, volumes X–XII.

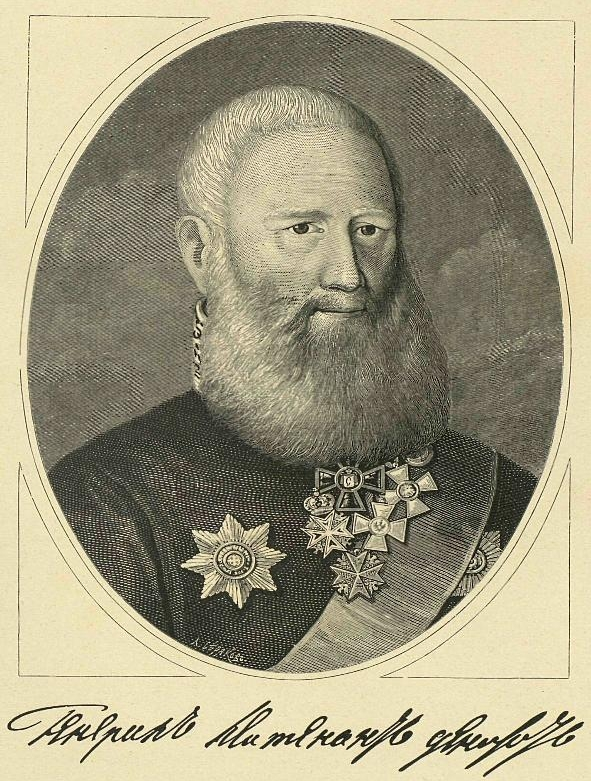
Engraving by Lavrentiy Seryakov

== Sources ==
- Velichko, Konstantin; Novitsky, Vasily; Schwartz, Alexey von; Apushkin, Vladimir; Schoultz, Gustav von (1912). Военная энциклопедия Сытина [Sytin Military Encyclopedia] (in Russian). Vol. IX. Двина Западная – Елец. Moscow: Типография Т-ва И. Д. Сытина. pp. 37–38.
- Polovtsov, Alexander (1905). Russian Biographical Dictionary. Vol. 6: Дабелов – Дядьковский. St. Petersburg: Типография Товарищества "Общественная Польза". pp. 236–238.
- Arsenyev, Konstantin; Petrushevsky, Fyodor (1893). Brockhaus and Efron Encyclopedic Dictionary (in Russian). Vol. X. Давенпорт – Десмин. Friedrich A. Brockhaus (Leipzig), Ilya A. Yefron (St. Petersburg). p. 390.
