= San Paolo, Imbersago =

Italian church

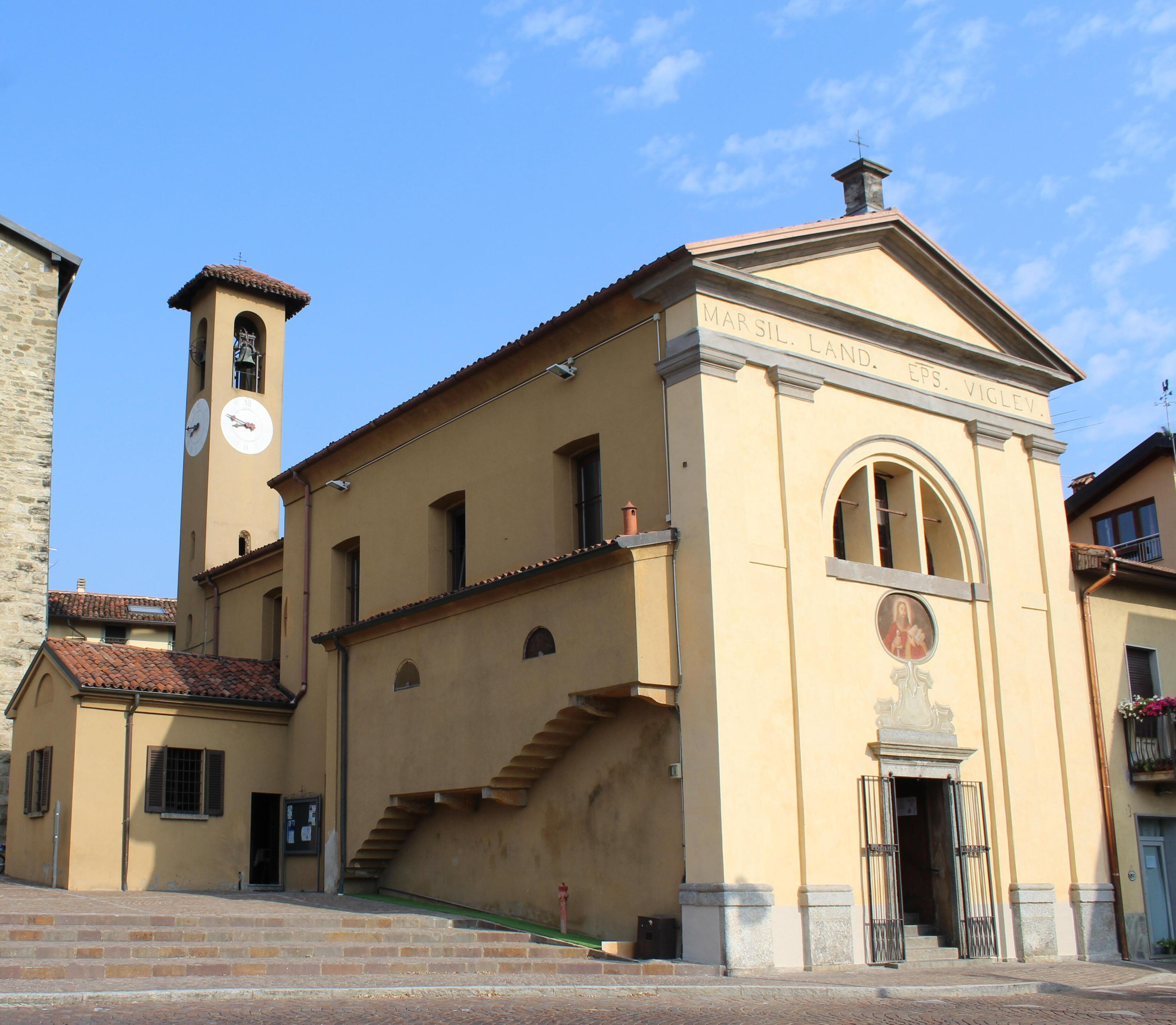

San Paolo is a small Roman Catholic church in Imbersago, province of Lecco, region of Lombardy, Italy.

== History ==
A church at the site was likely present by 10th century, perhaps associated the Frankish knights, that occupied the town about that time. The structure has undergone numerous reconstructions, including the present Neoclassical façade. The church has a single nave with façade to the east, and apse in the west: the typical geographic layout of Romanesque churches. The tympanum of the façade has a fading inscription the states Marsilio Landriani, 16th-century lords of the territory were associated with the church.

The Ladriani family donated some of the artworks in the interior, including the main altarpiece depicting a Maestà of the Virgin and Child with a choir of Angelic Musicians, St Ambrosius, St Eustorgius, and the Donor, Marsilio Landriani, attributed to either Camillo and Giulio Cesare Procaccini or Carlo Francesco Nuvolone. Other paintings depict nine apostles, an Adoration by the Shepherds and a Via Crucis.
