= Santi Marcellino e Pietro, Imbersago =

Parish church building in Imbersago, Italy

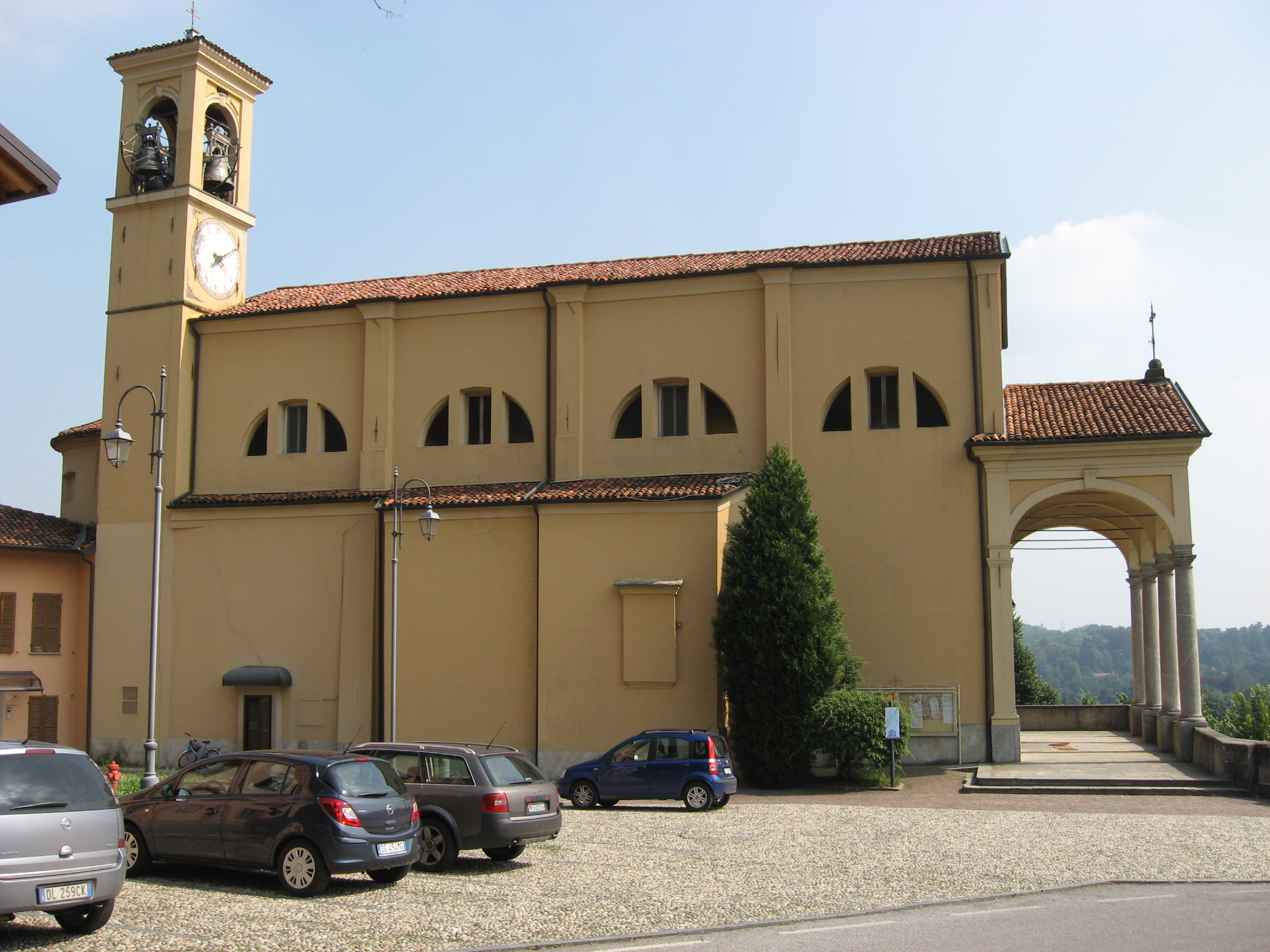
Parvise of the Church of Santi Marcellino e Pietro in Imbersago, Italy

Santi Marcellino e Pietro is a Neoclassical-style, Roman Catholic church in Imbersago, province of Lecco, region of Lombardy, Italy.

A church at the site was likely present by the 12th or 13th century. However, a map from 1721 shows the church with attached cloisters. In 1789, Luigi Canonica, putatively pupil of Giuseppe Piermarini, was commissioned to enlarge the church, and create a new facade.

Marcellinus and Peter are venerated within the Catholic Church as martyrs who were beheaded.

The church has a single nave. The sanctuary is separated from the rest of the nave by a marble balustrade. The main altar, in white marble, was designed and sculpted by Alessandro Verdi. The organ was built by the Serassi family.
