= Verderio Inferiore =

Defunct Italian municipality

Verderio Inferiore was a comune (municipality) in the Province of Lecco in the Italian region Lombardy. In 2014 it was merged with Verderio Superiore, forming the new comune of Verderio.
