= Visconti Citadel (Bergamo) =

Fortification in Bergamo

- Cittadella Viscontea di Bergamo
- Bergamo, Lombardia, Northern Italy
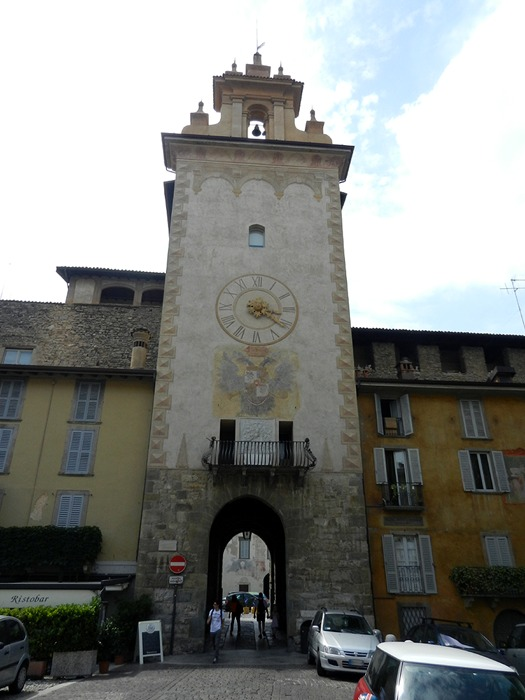
- The tower at the entrance of the Citadel (Torre della Campanella)

Site information
- Type: Citadel
- Owner: Bergamo municipality
- Open to the public: Yes
- Condition: Good

Location
- Location within Northern Italy
- Coordinates: 45°42′20″N 9°39′33″E

Site history
- Built: 14th century
- Built by: Bernabò Visconti
- Materials: Bricks, Stone

The Visconti Citadel of Bergamo is a medieval fortification in Bergamo, Lombardy, northern Italy. It was built in the 14th century by the Visconti of Milan and later expanded by the Colleoni of Bergamo. It lies in the western sector of Bergamo's Città Alta (Upper Town).

== History ==
In 1355, Bernabò Visconti initiated the construction of the Citadel to consolidate his power over Bergamo. The Citadel incorporated a pre-existing fortress and part of the nearby medieval walls. It belonged to the defensive system of the Città Alta of Bergamo, strengthening the western sector on San Giovanni Hill and integrating the fortification in the eastern sector on Sant'Eufemia Hill. The Citadel comprised an enclosure fortified with towers. It was closed to the north by the Hospitio Magnum, the seat of a military garrison.

Under the Venetian domination, the defensive strategy of Bergamo was modified, and the Citadel's role changed. No longer needed as a fortress, the Citadel was abandoned and put up for sale in lots. This transition caused the obliteration of the original Visconti structure, marking a significant shift in the Citadel's history.

In 1958, restorations began, reasserting the Citadel's historical importance. The surviving parts of the ancient fortified nucleus of La Crotta, including the imposing Adalberto tower, were recovered. The Hospitio Magnum building, the arched portico, and the tower at the entrance (Torre della Campanella) featuring the Citadel Clock were also restored. The typical Visconti lozenge decorations and frescoes of the 14th and 15th centuries came out during the works. Further restorations from 1985 to 1988 uncovered the remains of the Salt Tower and other parts of the complex, ensuring the preservation of the historical site.

== Today ==
The Citadel hosts municipal services with social and cultural interest, such as the La Crotta public garden, the Civic Museum of Natural Sciences, the Civic Archaeological Museum, the Pocket Theater, the Institute of Geology, and the Montessori Center.

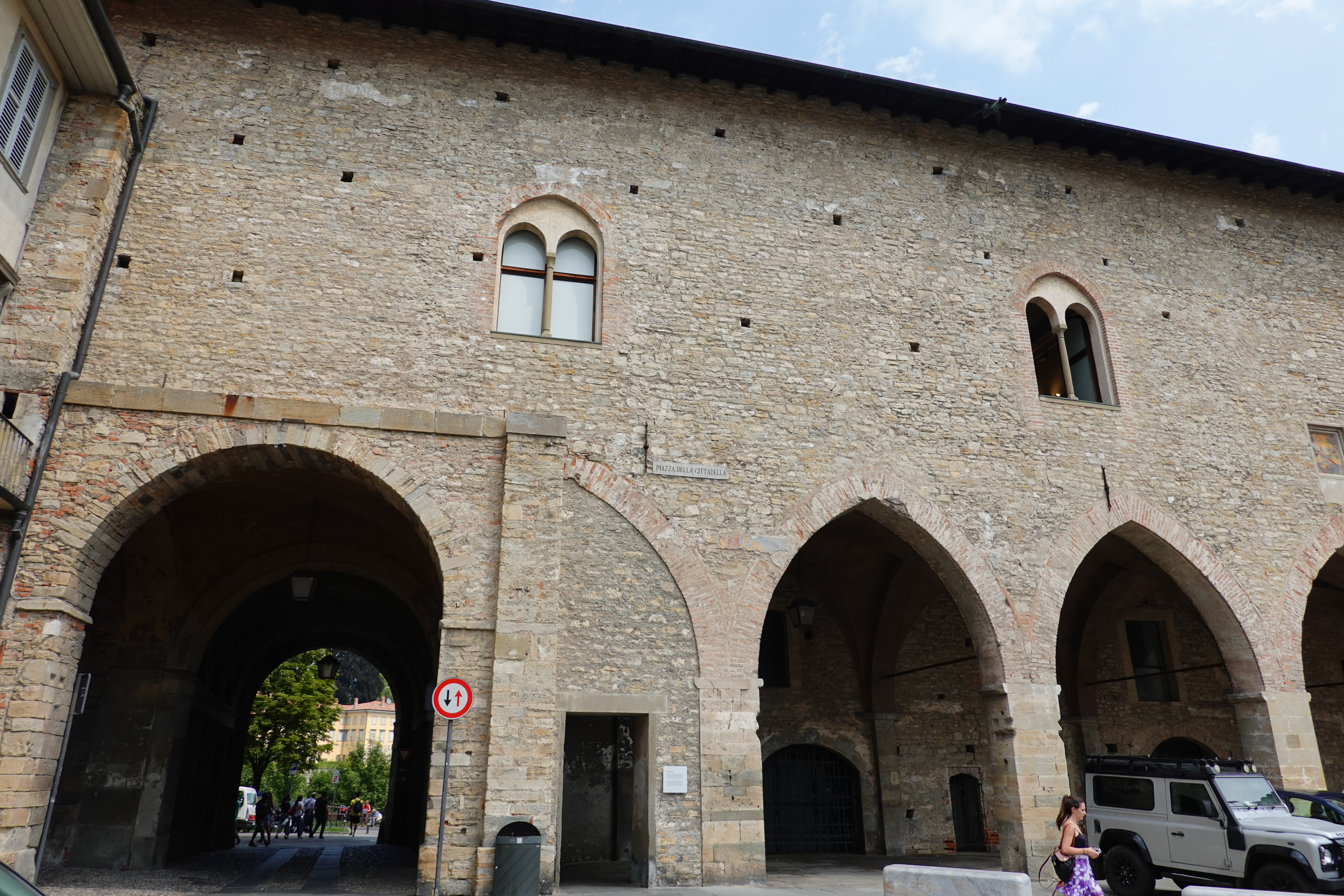
Entrance gate and portico; on the upper floor, the mullioned windows overlooking the courtyard

== Sources ==
- Conti, Flavio; Hybsch, Vincenzo; Vincenti, Antonello (1993). I castelli della Lombardia. Provincie di Bergamo e Brescia (in Italian). Novara: Istituto Geografico de Agostini. ISBN 9788841501610. OCLC 635677243.
- Vincenti, Antonello (1981). I Castelli viscontei e sforzeschi (in Italian). Milan: Rusconi Libri S.p.A. Immagini. OCLC 8446824.
