= Verderio Superiore =

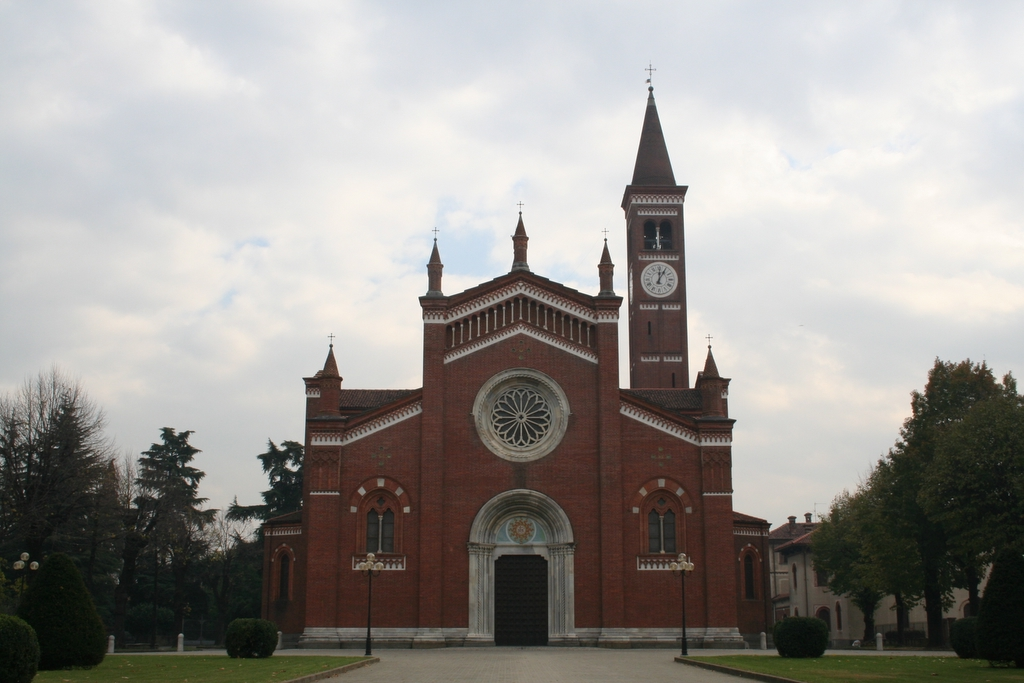
Verderio Superiore, la Parrocchiale.

Verderio Superiore was a comune (municipality) in the Province of Lecco in the Italian region Lombardy. In 2014, it was merged with Verderio Inferiore, forming the new comune of Verderio.
