= Luigi Santucci =

Biography on Italian author

- Born: 11 November 1918; Milan
- Died: 23 May 1999 (aged 80); Milan, Italy
- Education: Università Cattolica del Sacro Cuore
- Occupations: essayist, novelist, poet, satirist

Luigi Santucci (11 November 1918 - 23 May 1999) was an essayist, novelist, poet, and satirist.

== Biography ==
He graduated with a doctoral degree in Italian literature at the Catholic University of Milan, studying under Mario Apollonio. He worked for some years as a critic and essayist of children's literature. He worked at the Catholic University of Milan until 1944, when he fled to Switzerland because of his involvement in the Italian Resistance and opposition to the fascist regime. Along with poet David Maria Turoldo, Santucci helped found the underground newspaper of the Resistance L'Uomo. After the war, he wrote novels including In Australia con mio nonno (1947). He served as professor of literature at the Brera Academy until 1962.

== Works ==
Among his works are:

- Lo zio prete (1951)
- L’imperfetta letizia (1954)
- Il diavolo in seminario (1955)
- Il velocifero (1963)
- Noblesse oblige (1964)
- Orfeo in paradiso (1967, premio Campiello)
- Volete andarvene anche voi? Una vita di Cristo (1969) - Meeting Jesus: A New Way to Christ, Herder and Herder (1971), Wrestling with Christ, Collins (1972), translated by Bernard Wall.
- Se io mi scorderò (1969),
- Non sparate sui narcisi (1971)
- Come se (1973)
- Il mandragolo (1979)
- Poesia e preghiera nella Bibbia (1979)
- Il ballo della sposa (1985)
- Il cuore dell’inverno (1992)
- Nell’orto dell’esistenza (1996)
- Le frittate di Clorinda (1996)
- Éschaton: traguardo di un’anima (1999)
