= Battle of Trebbia (1799) =

1799 battle during the War of the Second Coalition

Battle of the Trebbia
- Part of Suvorov's Italian campaign in the War of the Second Coalition
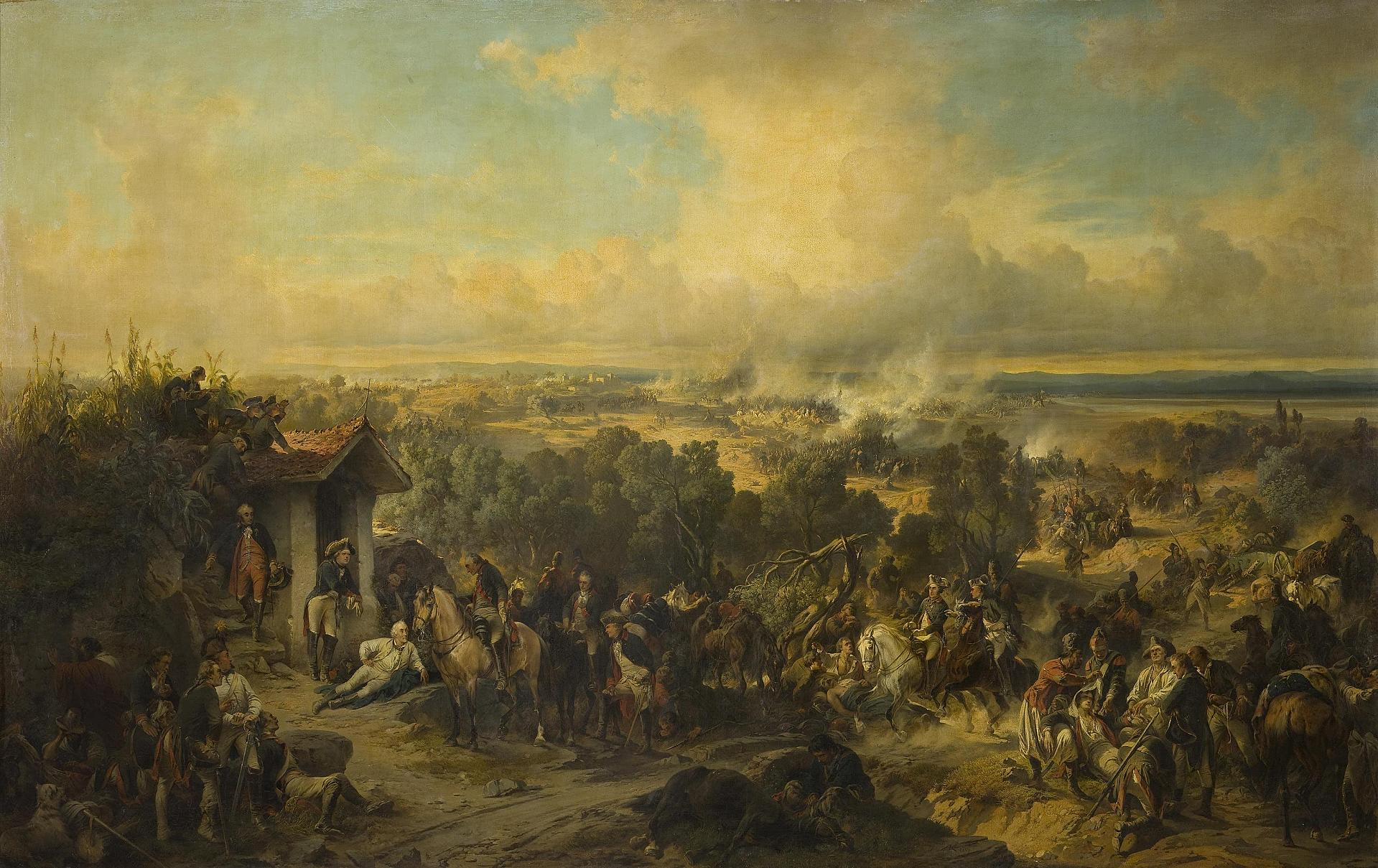
- Suvorov's battle at Trebbia by Alexander Y. Kotzebue (1857)
Date	17–20 June 1799 (Note: If the action of the Nure is excluded, 17–19 June.)
Location	Trebbia River in Po Valley, Duchy of Parma, Northern Italy; present-day Italian Republic 45°3′0″N 9°36′0″E
Result	Russo-Austrian victory

Belligerents
(French First Republic) France: • Polish Legion; • Lombard Legion	(Russian Empire) Russia (Holy Roman Empire) Habsburg monarchy

Commanders and leaders
(French First Republic) Étienne Macdonald (French First Republic) Claude Victor-Perrin (Note: Macdonald, in consequence of suffering from wounds received at Modena, entrusted him with the exercise of tactical control of the battle, but Victor declined to intervene in this role, being in Piacenza. Victor was sick, too.) (French First Republic) Jean-Baptiste Salme (POW) (French First Republic) François Watrin (French First Republic) Jean-Baptiste Olivier (POW) (French First Republic) Joseph de Montrichard (French First Republic) Jean-Baptiste Rusca (POW); Jan Dąbrowski (WIA)	(Russian Empire) Alexander Suvorov (Russian Empire) Andrey Rosenberg (Russian Empire) Pyotr Bagration (WIA) (Russian Empire) Yakov Povalo-Shveikovsky (WIA) (Russian Empire) Ivan Förster (Holy Roman Empire) Michael von Melas (Holy Roman Empire) Peter Ott (Holy Roman Empire) Johann Chasteler (Habsburg monarchy) Michael von Fröhlich

Units involved
Army of Naples, Gen. Macdonald: Salme's Advance Guard; Watrin's Division; Olivier's Division; Montrichard's Division; Victor's Division; Rusca's Division; Dąbrowski's Division; Artillery Park	Allied Field Army, FM Suvorov: 1st Column (Rosenberg); Bagration's Advance Guard; Povalo-Shveikovsky's Division; 2nd Column (Förster, Rosenberg); Förster's Division; 3rd Column (Melas); Ott's Division; Fröhlich's Reserve Division

Strength
33,000–35,000 (Note: 33,000 to 35,000 in the action: approx. 7,000 rising to 18–19,000 – 17 June; approx. 22,000 – 18 June; approx. 33,000–35,000 – 19 and 20 June.; 26,000 fit for combat on the 19th, with 28 guns; 36,728 whole strength; up to 37,000)	30,000–32,656 (Note: 24–25,000 at Suvorov's march on 17 June to the Tidone River—towards Peter Ott's division (which then numbered down to approx. 5,000 out of 12,000 available to Ott, Klenau and Hohenzollern); 30,000 to 32,656 (Note: Duffy gave the total number of cavalry and infantry, without gunners. These figures from Joseph von Stutterheim, and Duffy considered them trustworthy. He also stated that in terms of numbers, the armies were probably evenly matched. n.b.: Rosenberg's forces (2 columns total) and Ott's division are included in this number.) in the action: approx. 5–6,000 rising to 14–15,000 – 17 June; approx. 22,000 – 18 and 19 June; up to 32,656 – 20 June. (Note: According to Petrushevsky, "during the first three days, the number could not exceed 30,000" and "did not reach that figure".); Total per Smith, Bodart, Rothenberg, and Dupuys: 37,000 (Note: Dupuys: "Concentrating 37,000 men unexpectedly against MacDonald...") (20,000 Austrians, 17,000 Russians).; Grand total per Dupuys, Tucker, and Acerbi: ~40,000.); (Russian Empire) ≤18,219 (Note: That includes 2,000 Cossacks.); (Holy Roman Empire) ≤14,437

Casualties and losses
16,000–18,000 killed, wounded, captured, and missing (Note: In battle: 16,000; 16,500; 17,000; 18,000; In all: ~20,000–21,000) (incl. 8 generals and 502 officers)...more calculations 7 guns and 8 standards captured	5,500–6,000 killed, wounded, captured, and missing (Note: In battle: 5,500; 6,000; 800 KIA, 4,000 WIA, 500 Austrians POWs) (incl. 3 generals and 149 officers)...more calculations
- Location within Europe

War of the Second Coalition:
Italy
current battle
Napoleon in command
Napoleon not in command

The Battle of (the) Trebbia (17–20 June [O.S. 6–9 June] 1799) was fought near the rivers of Tidone, (Note: 17 June) Trebbia, (Note: 18–19 June) and Nure (Note: 20 June) in northern Italy between the joint Russian and Habsburg army under Alexander Suvorov and the Republican French army of Étienne-Jacques-Joseph-Alexandre Macdonald. Though French forces were moderately more numerous, the Austro-Russians severely defeated the French using the oblique order tactics, sustaining about 5,500 casualties while inflicting losses of 16,500 on their enemies. The Russian contingent was on the right flank of the coalition force and in the center, and it was the Russian units that played the main attacking role; the Austrians dealt with the French on the left flank, and they helped the Russians in the center. The War of the Second Coalition engagement occurred west of Piacenza, a city located 70 kilometres (43 mi) southeast of Milan.

In the spring of 1799 the Habsburg and Russian armies ousted the French from much of northern Italy after the battles of Magnano and Cassano and they placed the key fortress of Mantua under siege. Assembling the French occupation forces of southern and central Italy into an army, Macdonald moved north to challenge his enemies. Rather than playing safe by moving along the west coast road, Macdonald boldly chose to move east of the Apennine Mountains, hoping to be supported by Jean Victor Marie Moreau's French army from Genoa. After brushing aside a much smaller Austrian force at Modena, Macdonald's army swept west along the south bank of the Po River. Suvorov swiftly concentrated his Russians and the allied Austrians of Michael von Melas to block the French move, eventually covering around 85 km (53 mi) in 36 hours in sweltering heat and heavy equipment. (Note: The march is meant to be from Alessandria to the Tidone. The equipment includes a musket, bayonet, cartridges, a backpack, a canteen, a greatcoat and a bladed weapon.) At the desire of Francis II, Suvorov did not receive the expected support from Paul Kray's Austrian corps, which was involved at Mantua. Battling through intense heat for four days (17–20 June), the weary Allied troops engaged the enemy immediately after their forced march (rapid military advance), pushing past the limits of exhaustion. The French units also gradually joined the battle, since they were on the march as well. Suvorov's task of defeating Macdonald was made easier by the latter's physical weakness, as Macdonald was still suffering from the wounds received at Modena and therefore was bedridden, that is why the French command was not as effective as it could have been. Nevertheless, Macdonald was still able to assess tactical situations and subsequently give orders.

Early on 17 June, Macdonald's leading divisions bumped into a 5,000-strong Austrian holding force led by Peter Karl Ott von Bátorkéz along the Tidone River. Suvorov was more than 15 km (9.3 mi) from the battlefield at this time, but that same day Ott was steadily and rapidly reinforced by the mass of Suvorov's Austro-Russian army and the French pulled back to the Trebbia. Suvorov attacked on the 18th: the equally numbered French managed to hold off the Allied drive but abandoned their positions on the west bank of the Trebbia. On 19 June, Macdonald's entire army of 33,500 was almost concentrated and – with up to 26,000 men fit for combat – Macdonald ordered an attack which was poorly coordinated and repulsed at all points by the 22,000-strong Coalition forces. Realizing that assistance from Moreau was not forthcoming, that night Macdonald ordered the beaten French army to slip away to the south and west. The French also had more men to begin the battle with, 19,000 compared to the 12–15,000 of the Russians and Austrians (including latecomers from both the Allied and French sides); however, Suvorov's forced march helped to concentrate superior forces on 17 June. With the forced march to help Ott, a better concentration of forces on the battlefield, and generally his principle of "coup d'œil, speed, impetus", Suvorov remained one step ahead of Macdonald from 17 to 19 June. On the 20th, along the Nure River, the Allies overran the French 17th demi-brigade acting as rearguard. Macdonald hoped for help from Moreau, but the latter only managed to achieve an indecisive victory over Suvorov's covering force on 20 June, more than 80 km (50 mi) from Suvorov. Instead of bringing a powerful reinforcement to the hard-pressed French in northwest Italy, only the crippled remains of Macdonald's army arrived to Moreau. During the Allied pursuit, 7,500 wounded Frenchmen left in Piacenza hospital were captured by Melas. Among them were generals: Salme, Olivier, Rusca. Thus, the total number of unwounded prisoners, wounded prisoners, and missing amounted to 14,500 French; the total number of bloody losses, inclusive of wounded prisoners, amounted to 9,500, of which only 2,000 French were killed, or up to 4,000 or 6,000 killed, as some estimates inflate. Among Suvorov, 1,000 were killed, 4,000 were wounded and 500 were captured/missing. Some authors estimate fewer than 1,000 killed among the Allies, and less than 2,000 killed among the French. (Note: § Casualties)

The Battle of the Trebbia, or "The Campaign of the Trebbia" as military historian Duffy titled it, is one of the great victories in Alexander Suvorov's military career, along with the storming of Izmail. (The "campaign" applies to all operational movements from 17 to 20 June.) French general Moreau referred to the battle as a masterpiece of the military art, with Macdonald, the French general whom Suvorov defeated, sharing the same opinion. Military historians note that if Suvorov had no previous feats in his career, that the Trebbia campaign alone would make him a great commander.

Due to participation of some 3,000 soldiers of the Polish Legions, who were in the nominal service of the Cisalpine Republic, the Battle of Trebbia is commemorated on the Tomb of the Unknown Soldier, Warsaw, with the inscription "TREBBIA 17 - 19 VI 1799". Macdonald's army also included one Cisalpine dragoon regiment and one Cisalpine hussar regiment from the Lombard Legion.

== Background ==
=== Coalition successes ===
The War of the Second Coalition in northern Italian began with the inconclusive Battle of Verona on 26 March 1799 between the Habsburg army of Paul Kray and the Republican French Army of Italy under Barthélemy Louis Joseph Schérer. The subsequent Battle of Magnano on 5 April was a clear-cut victory by Kray over the French, with the Austrians sustaining 6,000 casualties while inflicting losses of 8,000 men and 18 guns on their foes. The defeat was a crushing blow to French morale and prompted Schérer to plead with the French Directory to be relieved of command. Finding his strong position behind the Mincio River outflanked on the north by 12,000 Austrians, Schérer left 12,000 troops to hold the key fortress of Mantua, directed 1,600 more to defend Peschiera del Garda and retreated to the west on 12 April. Two days later, Alexander Suvorov arrived at Vicenza with an Imperial Russian army and assumed command of the combined Austro-Russian forces.

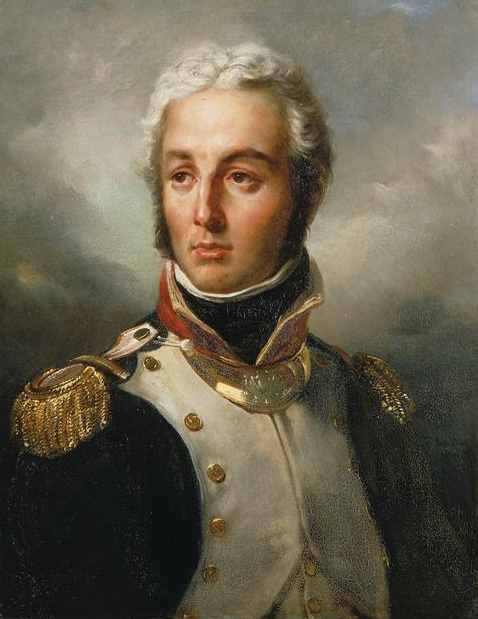
Jean Victor Moreau

On 27 April, the Coalition allies led by Suvorov were victorious over Jean Victor Marie Moreau's French army at the Battle of Cassano along the Adda River. The next day at Verderio, Jean-Mathieu-Philibert Sérurier's division was surrounded and in the fighting that followed the French lost 252 men killed before the 2,700 survivors gave up. The defeats caused Moreau to fall back, leaving 2,400 men to hold the Milan citadel. On 6 May the garrison of Peschiera capitulated to Kray while on 11 May Pizzighettone and 1,500 French soldiers surrendered to Konrad Valentin von Kaim. On 12 May, Suvorov's subordinate Andrei Grigorevich Rosenberg through the blame of Konstantin Pavlovich suffered a minor setback in the Battle of Bassignana, but then Suvorov's troops were victorious at the First Battle of Marengo (Battle of San Giuliano) on 16 May. Ferrara, Ravenna and Milan all capitulated to Austrian besieging forces on 24 May.

Meanwhile, 30,000 Allies under Suvorov moved up the north bank of the Po River toward Turin. On the morning of 26 May, Josef Philipp Vukassovich's advance guard seized Turin with its arsenal and over 300 cannons plus large stocks of ammunition. Pascal Antoine Fiorella and his 3,400-man French garrison withdrew to the citadel where they were besieged. Early June found the Allied main body of 47,087 troops under Suvorov, Rosenberg and Michael von Melas camped near Turin. Karl Joseph Hadik von Futak with 9,900 Austrians watched the Swiss mountain passes. Kray's 19,760-man corps was engaged in the Siege of Mantua, covered by 6,122 Austrians under Johann von Klenau at Ferrera. Finally, Suvorov summoned the 19,458-strong corps of Count Heinrich von Bellegarde from Switzerland to Milan where they arrived on 5 June. To face this array, Moreau counted about 25,000 soldiers in the divisions of Paul Grenier, Claude Victor-Perrin, Pierre Garnier de Laboissière at Genoa, Paul Louis Gaultier de Kervéguen at Florence and Joseph Hélie Désiré Perruquet de Montrichard at Bologna. But the Allies were aware that Jacques MacDonald had a strong French occupation force in southern and central Italy.

=== MacDonald's offensive ===
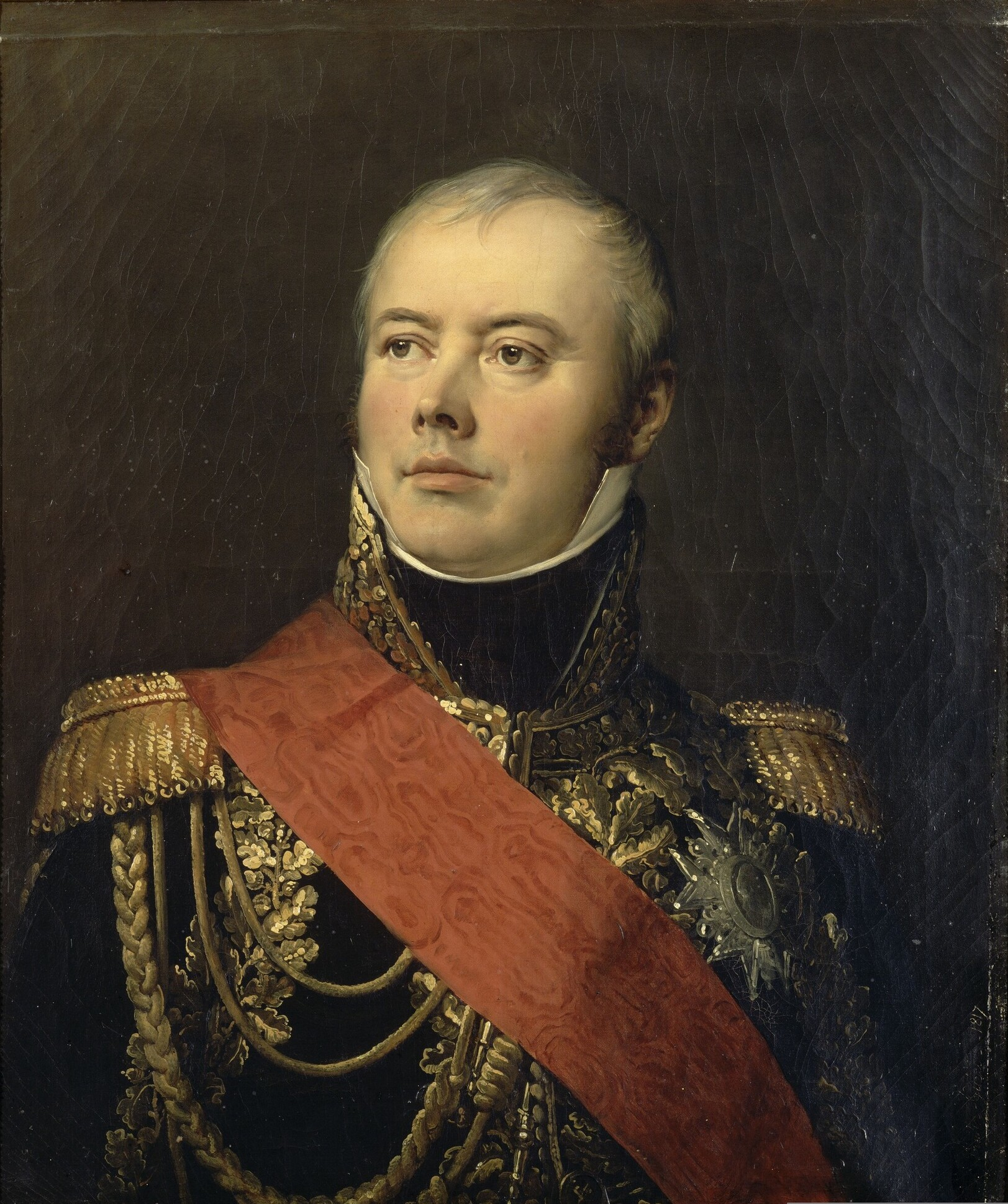
Jacques MacDonald

On 14 April 1799, the French Directory ordered MacDonald to help the French forces in northern Italy. Accordingly, he assembled the Army of Naples and moved north, leaving southern Italy in the hands of local forces. MacDonald reached Rome on 16 May and Florence ten days later. From there, the safest course was to use the west coast road to reach Genoa, keeping the Apennine Mountains between him and the Allies. However, MacDonald believed that the coast road was unusable for his artillery beyond Lerici and feared that Austrian columns might interfere with the operation. But perhaps the real reason was that MacDonald wished to make a theatrical entrance to the campaign by smashing his way through the Coalition allies. In order to accomplish this, he asked Moreau to march north and east to meet him near Piacenza, an impractical move that would place the Army of Italy in the midst of its enemies. After his passage across the Apennines, MacDonald hoped to crush some of the Austrian covering forces. As it moved north, the Army of Naples absorbed the divisions of Victor, Montrichard and Gaultier, bringing its total field force to 36,728 soldiers.

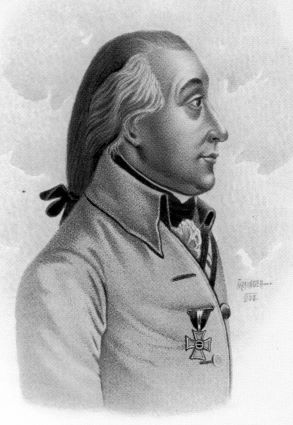
Peter Karl Ott

On 9 June Suvorov received news from Peter Karl Ott von Bátorkéz that Victor and Montrichard reinforced MacDonald and that the French captured Pontremoli. Ott commanded 5,000 soldiers that belonged to Bellegarde's corps, but were acting independently near Parma. Immediately, Suvorov ordered Ott to conduct a staged withdrawal to Stradella, but to hold that position at all hazards. The Russian commander quickly made up his mind to move east to confront MacDonald. With the exception of Kaim's division, the Austro-Russian army marched to Asti, reaching there on 11 June. The Allied troops reached the Bormida River near the French-held fortress of Alessandria on 13 June. That day, Suvorov got definite news of MacDonald's offensive. Until then, Suvorov had not realized the French's true intentions. The French command had been spreading false information that MacDonald's army was being prepared to embark and land in Genoa to join Moreau. It took foresight to discern the enemy's true intentions. Meanwhile, a French squadron put in at Genoa on 2 June to drop off French reinforcements. Intelligence indicated that Moreau was about to descend from the mountains. Suvorov ordered Bellegarde's corps to march on Alessandria to keep an eye on Moreau while the rest of his army concentrated against MacDonald.

The Army of Naples negotiated the Apennine Mountains in four major columns. The divisions of Montrichard and Jean-Baptiste Dominique Rusca formed the easternmost column, moving from Florence to Bologna. Next to the west were the divisions of Jean-Baptiste Olivier and François Watrin, accompanied by MacDonald and advancing from Pistoia on Modena. Farther west was Jean Henri Dombrowski's division descending the Secchia River valley. The westernmost column was made up of Victor's division marching from Borgo Val di Taro down the Taro River toward Parma. Because MacDonald's offensive across the Apennines was so unlikely, it took the Austrian covering forces by surprise. These were Klenau's command southwest of Ferrara, now reduced to 3,500 men, Prince Friedrich Franz Xaver of Hohenzollern-Hechingen at Modena with 4,800 troops and Ott west of Fornovo di Taro. MacDonald planned to destroy Hohenzollern's division by pinning it with his own column while enveloping it with Dombrowski's division from the west and Rusca's division from the east. Klenau deduced the French strategy and shifted northeast behind the Panaro River to block Rusca. MacDonald lost touch with Dombrowski's command. Nevertheless, MacDonald fell on the Austrians at Modena with two divisions. On 12 June in the Battle of Modena, the French inflicted losses of 750 killed and wounded on their enemies while capturing 1,650 men, eight guns and three colors. French casualties were 400 killed and wounded and 200 captured. During the pursuit, MacDonald was set upon by a troop of French Royalist cavalry and suffered saber cuts on the head and arm before his own soldiers could finish off their enemies.

Since the fortress of Alessandria commanded the only crossing of the Bormida, the Austro-Russian main body waited on a pontoon train which finally arrived on 15 June. At 5:00 pm the span was in place and Suvorov's army crossed and marched all night to reach Castelnuovo Scrivia on the morning of the 16th. After only three hours of rest, the soldiers continued the forced march during the day to their bivouac between Casteggio and Casatisma. In a period of 24 hours the Allied army covered 56 kilometres (35 mi) in the scorching heat. Many fell down from fatigue. To provide security for his right flank, Suvorov detached Mikhail Mikhailovich Veletsky with one battalion of the Jung-Baden Musketeer Regiment, 50 Cossacks and 80 dragoons from the Karaczay Regiment. Allowing for the possibility of defeat, the Russian army commander ordered the Po to be bridged at Mezzana Corti for the main army and Valenza for Bellegarde's corps. By this time, Bellegarde and 14,500 troops arrived to maintain the siege of Alessandria and contain Moreau. To keep MacDonald from raising the siege of Mantua, Kray manned the north bank of the Po with several thousand troops.

On 16 June at 10:00 am, MacDonald's vanguard arrived near Piacenza and began pressing Ott's command. Suvorov reiterated his orders for Ott to make a fighting retreat to the Stradella defile. By this time Austrian military engineer Albert Johann de Best got the Piacenza citadel into a defensible state after eight days of work; two or three companies of the Fröhlich Regiment were assigned to garrison it. Victor's division led the French attack on Ott as Rusca's soldiers edged toward the south as if to flank the Austrians out of position. That night, Suvorov's chief of staff Johann Gabriel Chasteler de Courcelles rushed toward Ott's position with 100 dragoons of the Karaczay Regiment plus a half-battery of horse artillery. Following behind was an improvised force including the Wouwermanns Grenadier Battalion, three battalions of the Fröhlich Regiment, the remainder of the Karaczay Regiment and one and one-half batteries of horse artillery. If Ott could hold out along the Tidone River, it would allow ample space for the Austro-Russian army to deploy between the Po and the mountain spurs to the south. If Ott were forced back into the narrow Stradella position, it would be difficult for the Allies to form a line of battle and might even cause a rout.

== Forces ==
=== Allied Army ===
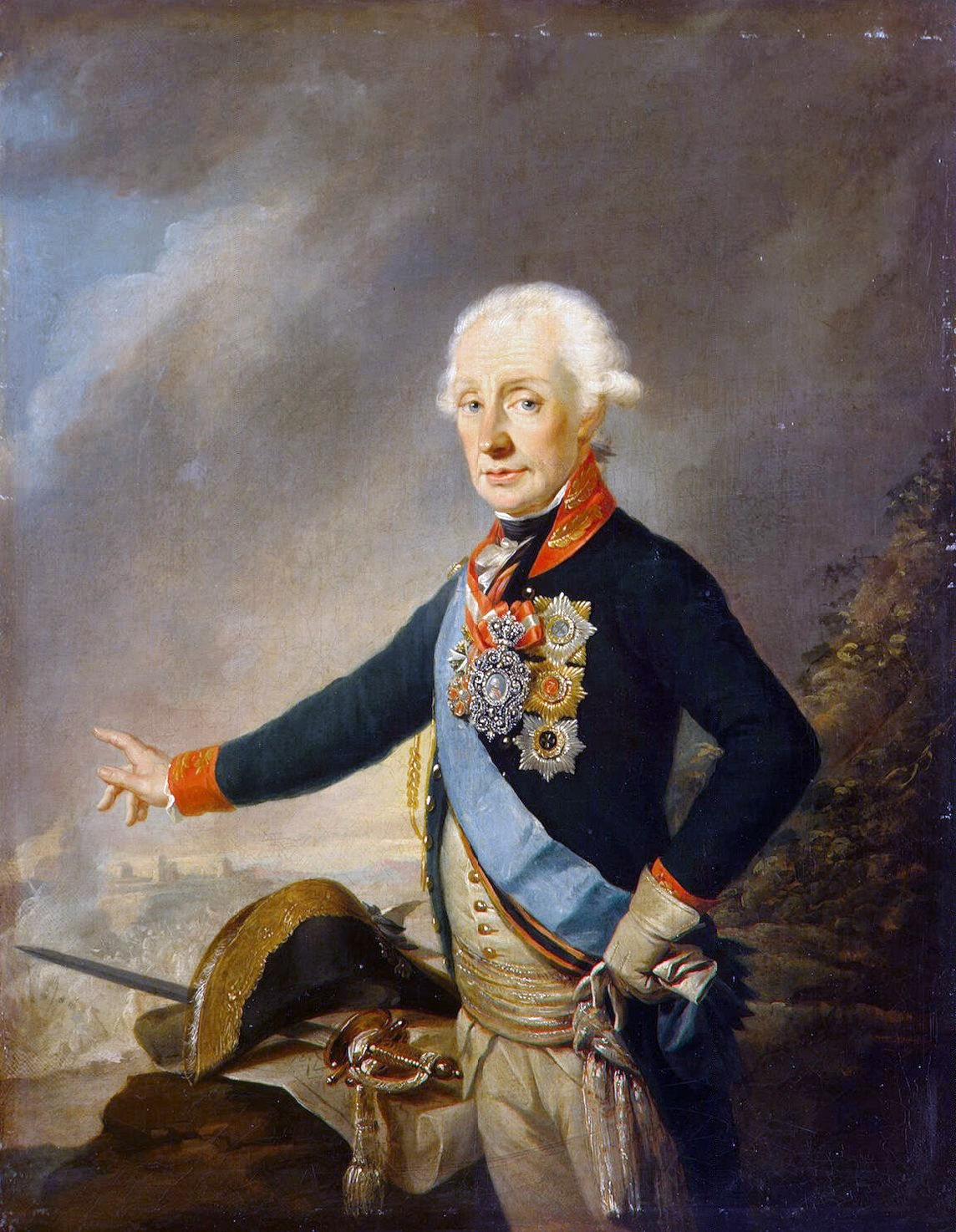
Alexander Suvorov

The Austro-Russian army commanded by Field Marshal Suvorov was organized by him into three columns on 18 June. General Rosenberg directed the mostly Russian First and Second Columns,—at the Second Column he exercised tactical control over its right-hand units,—Lieutenant General Ivan Ivanovich Förster was an actual commander of the whole Second Column, while General der Kavallerie Melas directed the mostly Austrian Third Column. The Austrian forces numbered 9,851 foot and 4,586 horse while the Russians counted 16,219 infantry and 2,000 Cossacks. These numbers amounted to 32,656 and did not include artillerymen. The figures in brackets represent Austrian casualties. The First Column on the right was headed by an Advance Guard under Major General Pyotr Ivanovich Bagration which included the Dendrygin, Kalemin, Lomonosov and Sanaev Combined Grenadier Battalions, two battalions of the Bagration Jäger Regiment, Grekov and Posdeev Cossack Regiments and six squadrons of the Austrian Karaczay Dragoon Regiment Nr. 4 [62]. Lieutenant General Yakov Ivanovich Povalo-Schveikovsky led an infantry division consisting of two battalions of the Rosenberg Grenadier Regiment, one battalion each of the Dalheim and Schveikovsky Musketeer Regiments and six squadrons of the Austrian Lobkowitz Dragoon Regiment Nr. 10 [107].

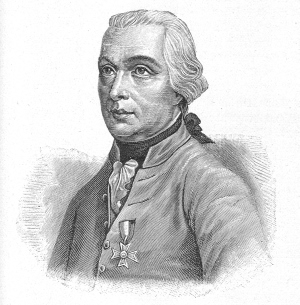
Michael von Melas

Rosenberg personally accompanied the Second Column in the center. The division commander was Förster and his infantry was made up of two battalions each of the Miloradovich and Tyrtov Musketeer Regiments and one battalion each of the Baranovsky, Förster and Jung-Baden Musketeer Regiments. The cavalry contingent was formed from the Molchanov Cossack Regiment and six squadrons of the Austrian Levenehr Dragoon Regiment Nr. 14 [76].

The Third Column under General der Kavallerie Melas was made up of a division under Feldmarschall-Leutnant Ott and a reserve under Feldmarschall-Leutnant Michael von Fröhlich with attached artillery [64]. Ott's division included four battalions of the Nádasdy Nr. 39 [565] and two battalions of the Mittrowsky Nr. 40 [198] Infantry Regiments, the Mihanovich Serbian Free Battalion [260], the 6th Battalion of the Banater Grenz Infantry Regiment [115], six companies of the d'Aspré Jäger Battalion, the Semernikov Cossack Regiment (Semernikov and Molchanov Cossacks were led by Major-General Andrei Ivanovich Gorchakov) and six squadrons of the Archduke Joseph Hussar Regiment Nr. 2 [152]. Fröhlich's reserve consisted of the Morzin [29], Paar [109], Pertusi [106], Schiaffinatti [37], Weber [62] and Wouwermanns [102] Grenadier Battalions. A second source stated that there were 17,000 Russians and 20,000 Austrians present and added three battalions of the Fröhlich Nr. 28 Infantry Regiment, six squadrons of the Württemberg Dragoon Regiment Nr. 8 [2] and listed seven rather than six Austrian grenadier battalions. This source also named as brigade commanders, Johann I Joseph, Prince of Liechtenstein for the grenadiers, Ferdinand Johann von Morzin for the Nádasdy, Mittrowsky and Württemberg Regiments and Friedrich Heinrich von Gottesheim for the d'Aspré, Mihanovich, Banater and Archduke Joseph units.

=== French Army ===
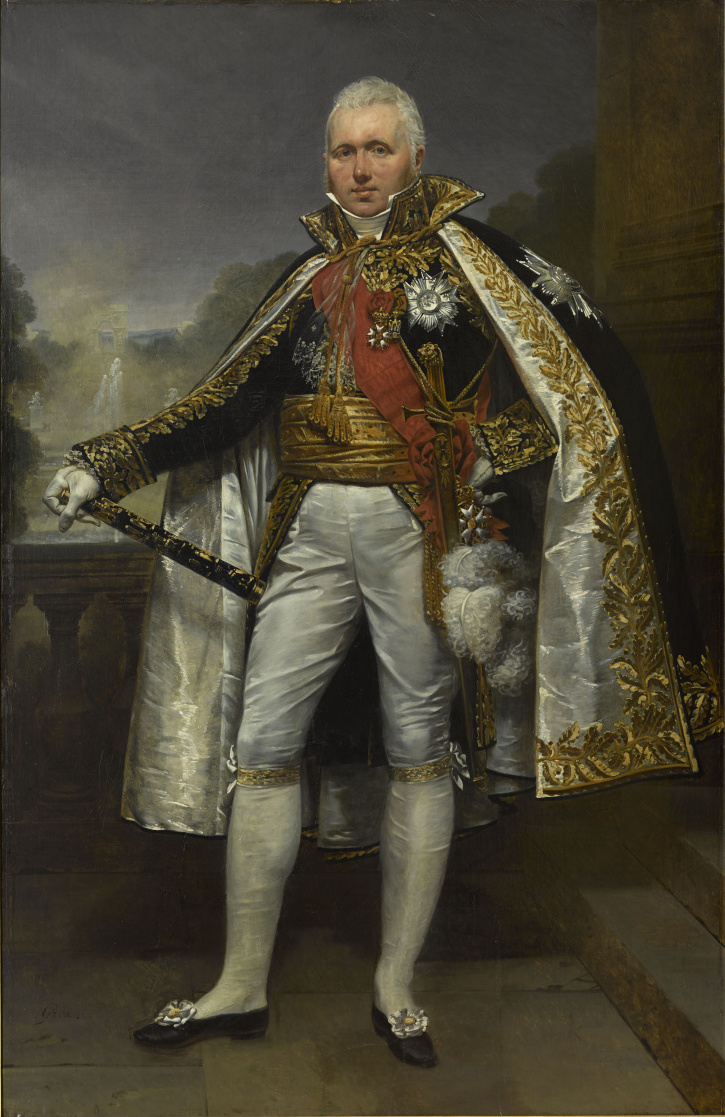
Claude Victor-Perrin

In MacDonald's Army of Naples Chef de brigade Victor Léopold Berthier served as chief of staff, Chef de bataillon Jacques Bardenet as chief of artillery and Jean-Louis Dubreton as commissary officer. In the 8 June order of battle that follows, the figures in parentheses are unit strengths. The Advanced Guard was led by General of Brigade Jean-Baptiste Salme and included the 11th Line (1,390), 12th Line (1,250) and 15th Light (1,340) Infantry Demi-Brigades, a detachment of the 25th Chasseurs à Cheval Regiment (85), the 6th Company of the 8th Foot Artillery Regiment (34) and the 3rd Company of the 1st Sapper Battalion (29). The 1st Division was commanded by General of Division Olivier and consisted of the 30th Line (1,508) and 73rd Line (2,009) Infantry Demi-Brigades, 7th Chasseurs à Cheval (321) and 19th Chasseurs à Cheval (314) Regiments and gunners and sappers (311). The 2nd Division was directed by General of Division Rusca and comprised the 17th Light (1,880), 55th Line (886) and 97th Line (1,760) Infantry Demi-Brigades, 16th Dragoon (488) and 19th Dragoon (330) Regiments and artillerists and sappers (116).

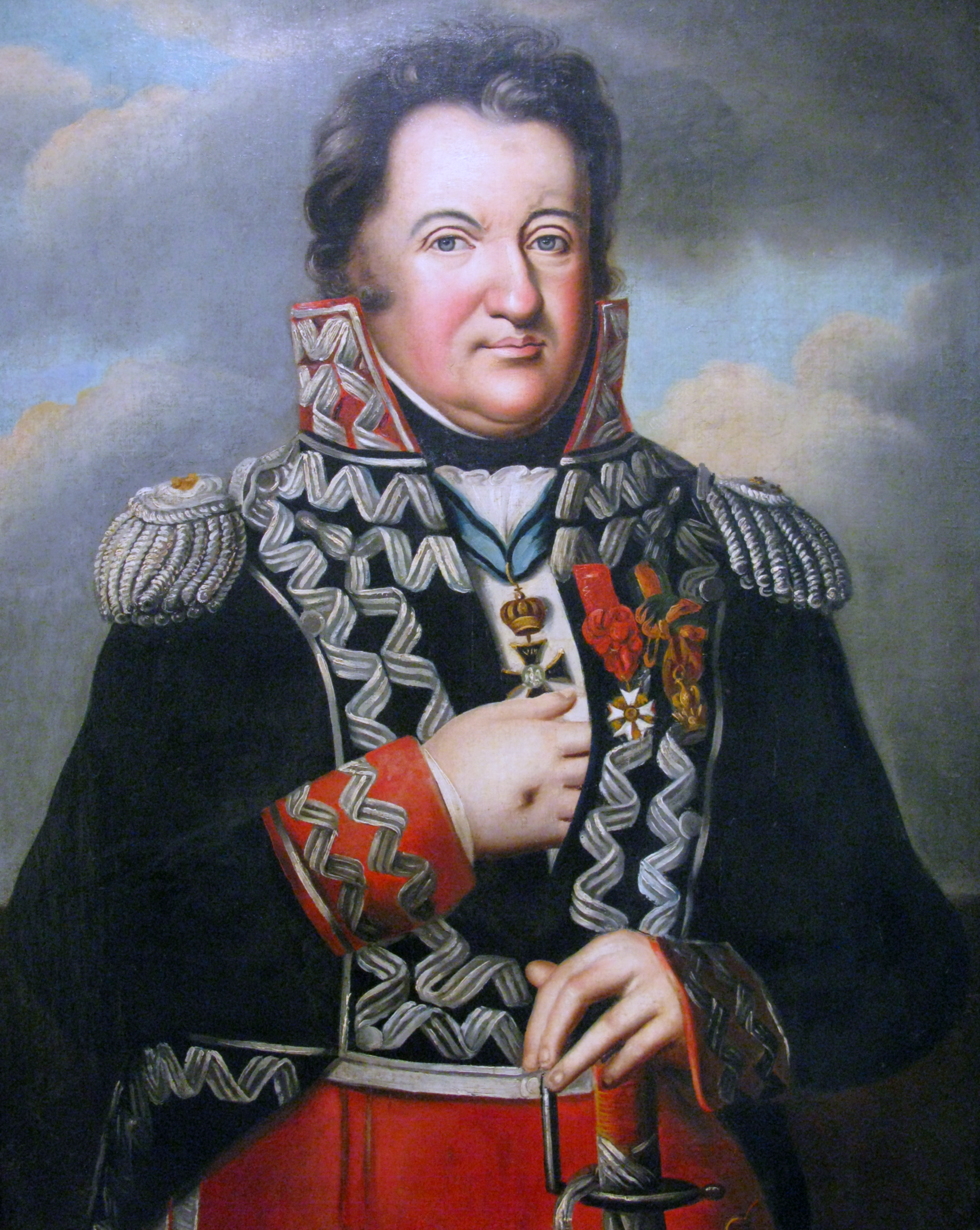
Jean Dombrowski

The 3rd Division was supervised by General of Division Montrichard and was made up of the 3rd (or 2nd) Line (730), 21st Line (1,000), 68th Line (900) and 5th Light (1,900) Infantry Demi-Brigades, 1st Cavalry (263), 12th Dragoon (400), 11th Hussar (250), Cisalpine Dragoon (100) and Cisalpine Hussar (308) Regiments and gunners and sappers (112). The 4th Division was commanded by General of Division Watrin and consisted of the 62nd Line (3,420) and 78th Light (2,120) Infantry Demi-Brigade, 25th Chasseurs à Cheval Regiment (260) and artillerists (33). The 5th Division was directed by General of Division Dombrowski and comprised the 1st Polish Legion (2,000), 8th Light Infantry Demi-Brigade (893) and Polish Cavalry (500).

The remaining infantry division was led by General of Division Victor and included the 5th Line (1,300), 39th Line (1,225), 92nd Line (1,240), 93rd Line (1,265) and 99th Line (1,320) Infantry Demi-Brigades and 15th Chasseurs à Cheval Regiment (400). There were also 526 men assigned to the artillery park. A second authority placed the 12th Line in Olivier's division rather than Salme's Advanced Guard, specified that the 17th in Rusca's division was Light Infantry, put the 2nd Line instead of the 3rd Line in Montrichard's division and listed different unit totals in some divisions. This second source gave the following division strengths for the end of May: Salme 2,997, Olivier 5,826, Rusca 5,397, Montrichard 5,773, Watrin 4,880, Dombrowski 3,555 and Victor 6,750. This yielded a strength of 30,980 infantry, 3,616 cavalry and 1,088 artillerymen and sappers for a 35,684 grand total. From this, losses from the Battle of Modena and other causes must be deducted.

== Battle ==
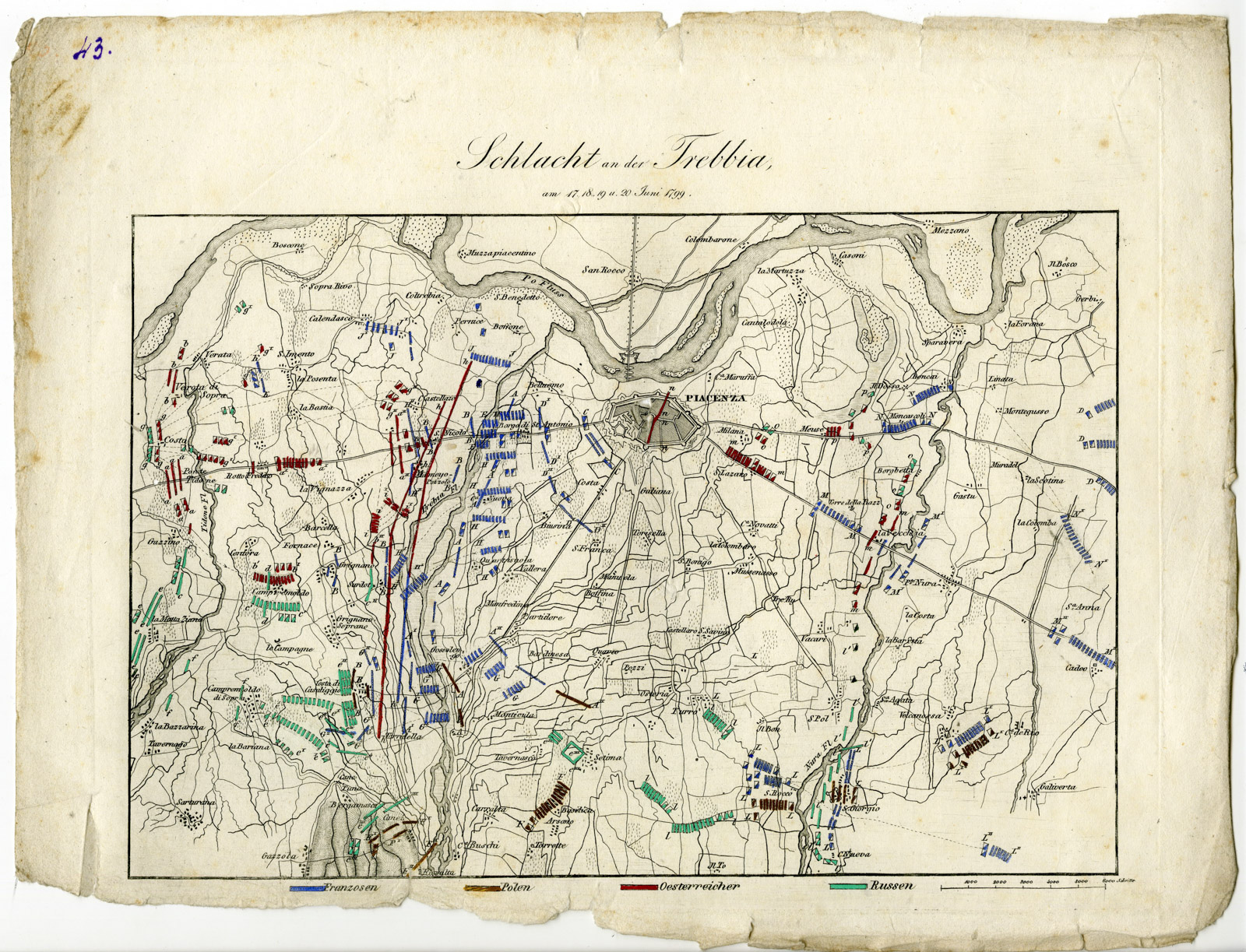
Map of the battle (17 to 20 June)

=== Tidone River – 17 June ===
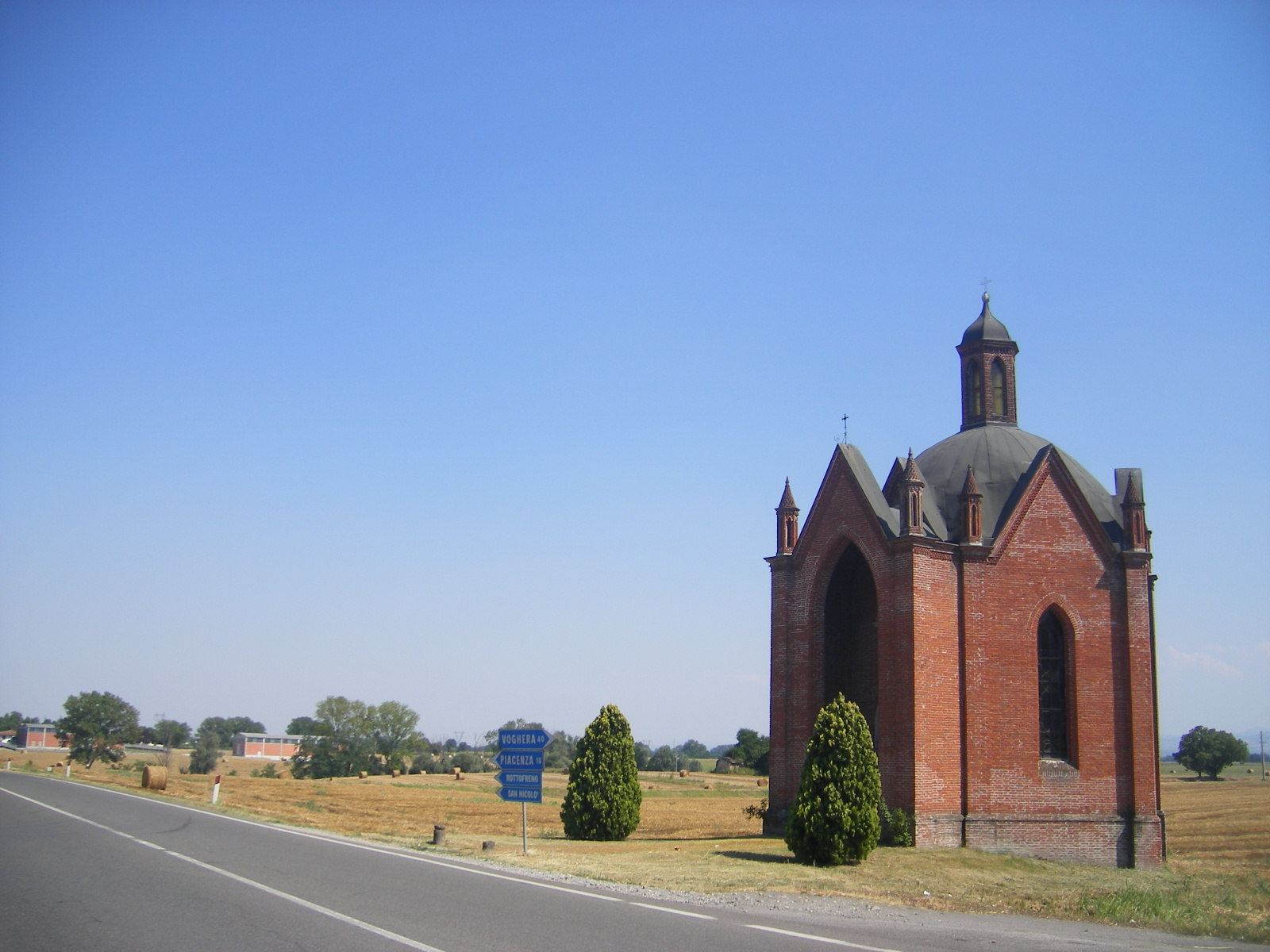
Country chapel is on the highway between Castel San Giovanni and Sarmato.

The Tidone River runs north into the Po west of Piacenza. With steep banks 2 to 3 metres high and a width of about 100 metres (109 yd), the stream has some defensive value. Like the Tidone, the bed of the Trebbia is filled with white stones. On 17 June at 8:00 am the French opened their attack against Ott's positions behind the Tidone. On hand were a total of 18,700 soldiers including Salme's Advance Guard. The French divisions were deployed with Victor on the right, Rusca in the center and Dombrowski on the left. Because of the wounds he sustained at Modena, MacDonald was bedridden in the village of Borgo San Antonio to the west of Piacenza. As senior officer Victor should have assumed tactical control of the fight, but he stayed in Piacenza, resulting in poor coordination of the French effort. Nevertheless, the determined initial assault ousted the d'Aspré Jägers from their west-bank positions in the hamlets of Agazzino, Pontetidone and Veratto di Sopra. As Dombrowski's troops mounted a flank attack to the south, the troops of Victor's division fought their way to the village of Sarmato where they were held up by an Austrian artillery battery and two battalions of the Nádasdy Regiment. Chasteler was with Ott when the French attack started. He urged Ott to hold as long as possible and went back to find that his task force was hurrying on its way. At 1:00 pm Chasteler's men arrived and were thrown into the fight. Nevertheless, at 3:00 pm the French overran both Sarmato and its defending battery, forcing Ott's troops back to a position in front of Castel San Giovanni.

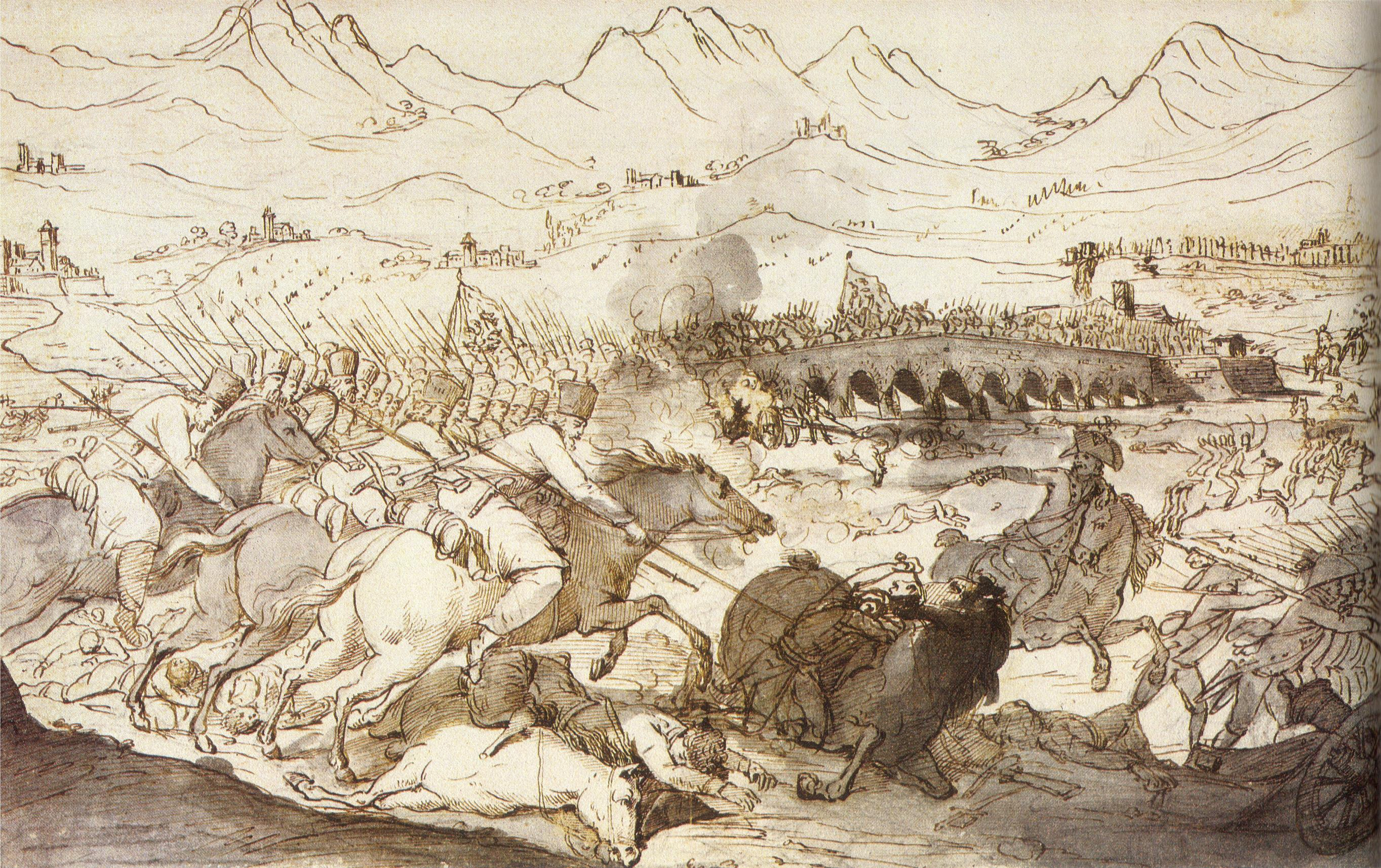
Battle of the Trebbia. Unknown author

Soon afterward Melas arrived with three battalions of Austrians foot and some squadrons of the Archduke Joseph Hussars. Suvorov inspired the Russian columns by suddenly appearing at odd places along the line of march. If inspiration failed, Cossacks were employed to prod stragglers back into line. Suvorov was "everywhere at once", moving from the rear to the front while constantly urging, "Forward, forward! The head does not wait for the tail." He rode alongside the troops, cracking jokes and acting the fool to keep their spirits up. This personal touch energized the men, causing the entire column to close ranks and push ahead with renewed focus. The troops "ran, not marched". Chasteler's units hustled off to the south to block a turning movement by Dombrowski's division. The Bagration Jäger Regiment veered off to the north while the four Russian combined grenadier battalions were committed to battle near Castel San Giovanni. Bagration approached Suvorov and half-voiced asked for permission to delay until at least some of the stragglers arrive, because the companies do not number even 40 men. Suvorov answered him quietly in his ear: "and MacDonald has not even 20 men; attack with God". Despite the odds turning against them, the French continued to mount spirited attacks. Gradually the Allies massed in two battle lines in front of Castel San Giovanni. Ott had held on with the help of Chasteler, and then the arrival of Melas, Suvorov and Bagration in very rapid succession built up the allies to a decisively superior 30,656 Austrians and Russians in regular troops alone (this is the overall numbers). Field Marshal Suvorov's orders for the forthcoming attack had in mind first of all to concentrate as large a force as possible; for this purpose officers were sent back to gather and bring the rest during the forced march on 17 June; orders were sent to Major General Nikolay Chubarov that he should hurry to join the army; besides, support from Kray was expected. However, neither Chubarov (he arrived on the 19th with 1,300 men) nor reinforcements from Kray arrived on that day, and the troops were reinforced only by stragglers, who were pulled up throughout 18 June and went straight from the march into the fray.

Finally, the Allies recaptured Sarmato and the abandoned Austrian cannons, compelling the French to retreat. The French fell back stubbornly, taking advantage of plentiful cover to repulse Austrian cavalry charges. Salme's Advanced Guard covered the last stages of the withdrawal, forming square at Ca' del Bosco on the northern part of the battlefield. The shooting ended by 9:00 pm. The French suffered losses of about 1,000 killed and wounded plus 1,200 more captured. Allied casualties are not given. Based on the results of 17 June, with up to 15,000 men Suvorov decisively rushed on 18,000 French, given the reinforcements that had arrived, and forced them to retreat.

=== Trebbia River – 18 June ===
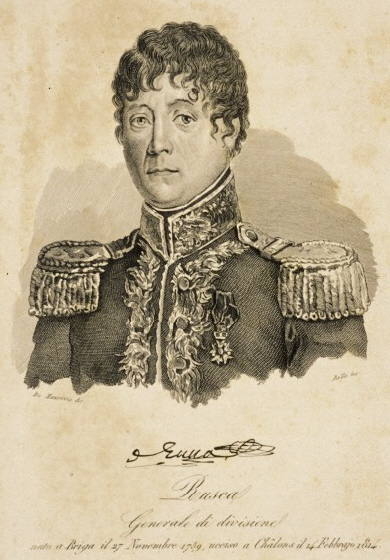
Jean-Baptiste Rusca

The Allied army had a total of 32 2/3 battalions, 24 squadrons and 4 Cossack regiments. Each division was ordered to build in combat order in two lines, 300 paces distance; each cavalry regiment — in the divizion way, having in the first line of two divizions, and in the second — one. The password and the slogan for June 18 were appointed "Theresia" and "Kolin", because the battle fell on the anniversary of the Austrian victory over Frederick the Great at Kolin in 1757. Such a reminder might have been encouraging to the Austrians.

Unexpectedly confronted by a large Austro-Russian army, MacDonald was in a dilemma. He believed that his 22,000 available soldiers were outnumbered and ought to retreat, but he anticipated that Moreau might soon arrive to pitch into the Allied rear. So he hoped to hold out until his last divisions could arrive on the field. MacDonald was also aware of the presence of a force under Jean François Cornu de La Poype that was in position to threaten the Allied south flank. On the 18th, Veletsky's detached force approached Bobbio and on the 21st surprised La Poype's 1,500 French and 2,000 Genoese, sending them fleeing back to Genoa. On morning of 18 June the injured MacDonald inspected his army. He found his men ready to fight and the enemy inactive. Meanwhile, Suvorov and Chasteler planned to throw three columns at the French, with the main strength on the right to break down MacDonald's flank by advancing from the Tidone to the Trebbia and finally all the way to the Nure River, the next river to the east. With luck, the French would be driven back against the Po. The First Column on the right was headed by Bagration's Advance Guard followed by Schveikovsky's division. The Second Column in the center was made up of Förster's division. The Third Column included the divisions of Ott and Fröhlich. Ott was ordered to drive straight ahead to the Trebbia supported by his colleague. At some point Fröhlich's grenadiers were supposed to reinforce the right flank in order to give more weight to its attack.

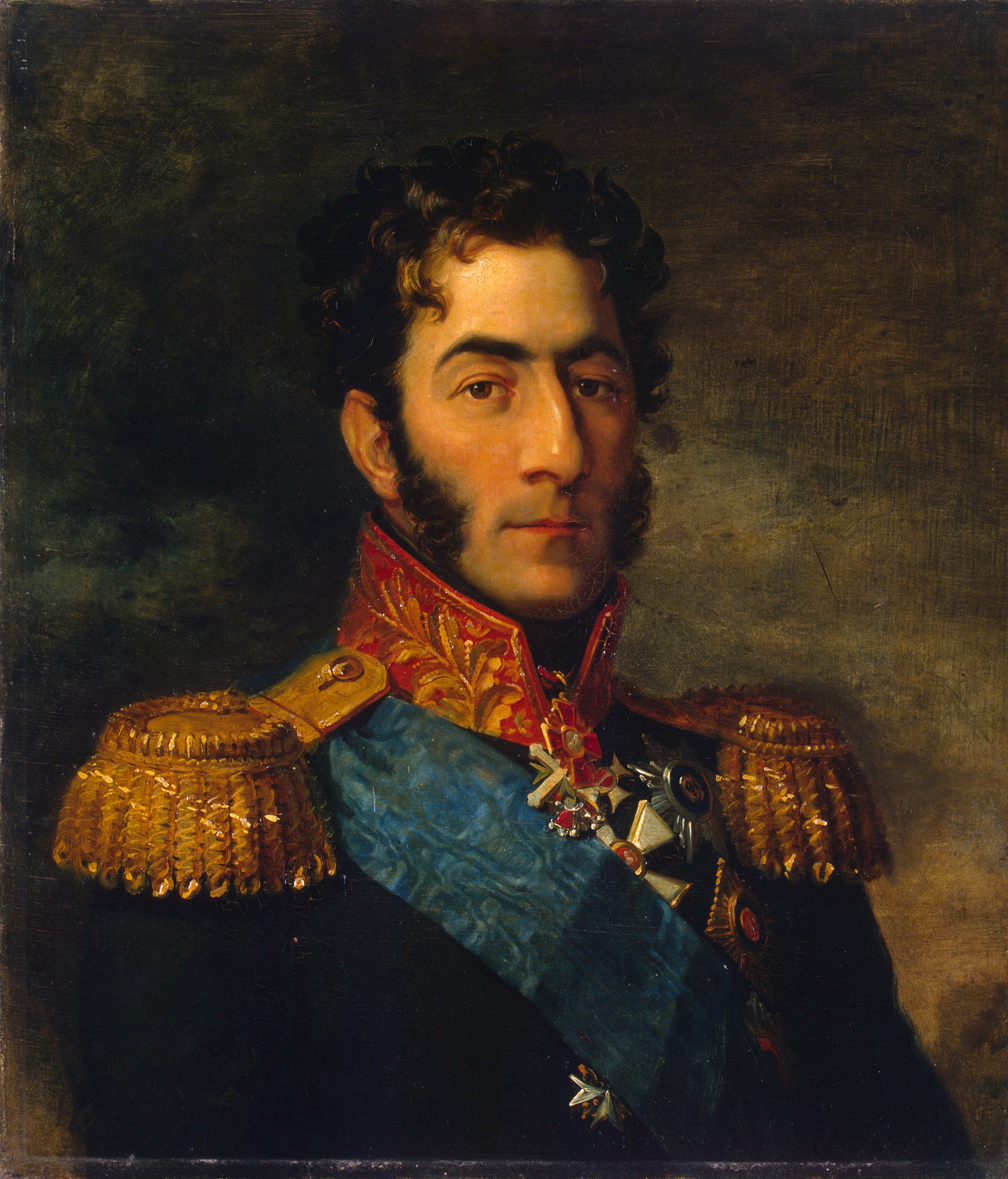
Pyotr Bagration

Suvorov's desire to start the attack at 7:00 am proved to be impractical due to the Allied soldiers' exhaustion, so it was put off until 11:00 am. Scouts reported that the French were defending behind the Trebbia with advanced positions near the villages of San Nicolò a Trebbia, Mamago Sotto Svizzera, Gragnano Trebbiense and Casaliggio, from north to south. Bagration's Advance Guard forded the Tidone and attacked Dombrowski's Polish Legion south of Casaliggio at 2:00 pm, achieving some surprise. Coming from the south, a Polish battalion threatened the Russian rear, but it was quickly hemmed in by Russian infantry, the Austrian Karaczay Dragoons, and Cossacks; 230 men were forced to lay down their arms. An alert French staff officer, Pierre Edmé Gautherin brought the divisions of Rusca and Victor to the west bank of the Trebbia where they stopped and drove back Bagration's troops. Rosenberg brought Schveikovsky's reserve division into the fight while Suvorov personally rallied the shaken Russian infantry. "Halt!" cried Alexander Vasilyevich Suvorov, and at that instant the line of retreating troops stopped, as a concealed battery spewed cannon shot into the French. They wavered in a state of shock, and stood for a while as the cannon shot, shells and canister from the hidden battery coursed through them. "Press on! Stupai, Stupai! With the bayonet! Hurrah!" continued to yell Suvorov. The Russians presently gained the upper hand and compelled Rusca to pull back to the east bank of the Trebbia, which his men accomplished while maintaining their ranks but hotly pursued by the allied cavalry. The fighting in the center began when the Levenehr Dragoons and Molchanov Cossacks clashed with some French horsemen and drove them back. Starting at 5:00 pm, Förster slowly pressed back the right wing of Victor's division. 2 companies of Tyrtov's regiment knocked several hundred French infantry of Rusca's division out of Gragnano. As the advanced French troops were pushed out of this village, part of Monrichard's division went forward to support them. Förster then put all his troops into action, leaving only one battalion in reserve, and attacked the opponent on the left bank of the Trebbia; seeing his flank exposed, Monrichard was forced to retreat. Thus, the French finally evacuated Gragnano and fell back across the Trebbia.

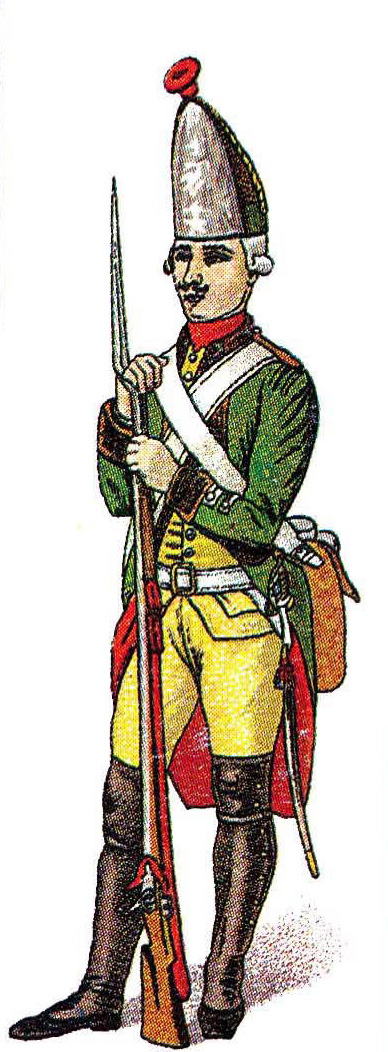
Russian grenadier of a musketeer regiment during Suvorov's anti-republican campaigns

Salme's Advanced Guard, which was posted near Sant' Imento north of the highway, was unchallenged most of the day. At about 2:30 pm, the divisions of Montrichard and Olivier crossed the Trebbia and marched to Salme's support. Seeing these French reinforcements in his front, Melas decided not to release Fröhlich's division, instead of helping the right flank, as he was supposed to. In general, during the two-day fighting at the Trebbia, Melas showed delay and indecision, or even half-heartedly carried out Suvorov's orders to put units into battle, which threatened the troops with a possible French breakthrough, including the decision not to bring Fröhlich into the battle. If Suvorov was not on the right flank (8,5 km from Melas), but, for example, at the middle column, he would have been able to understand Melas' behaviour in time and force him to do his will; but because of the right flank's importance, where the fate of the battle was decided, Suvorov had to be there. The Third Column commander sent Ott forward at 6:00 pm and the Austrians easily brushed aside Salme's outnumbered unit. Together, Ott and Fröhlich pushed Montrichard and Olivier back beyond the Trebbia by evening. That night in a bizarre operation, Rosenberg took two Russian grenadier battalions across the Trebbia south of Gossolengo. They somehow penetrated the French lines as far as Settima where they routed a French detachment and liberated some prisoners. At 3:00 am, Rosenberg's expedition headed back to the west bank, again without arousing any French sentries. Four squadrons of the Karaczay Dragoons mounted a similar expedition but were detected and driven off by musketry. Both groups missed the pointless battle that occurred earlier in the evening. Hearing what they believed to be Moreau's artillery, three French battalions mounted an extemporaneous attack at 9:30 pm, surprising an Austrian battalion. Melas called up reinforcements from his own and Förster's divisions while Prince Liechtenstein charged into the fray with the Lobkowitz Dragoons. The artillery of both sides opened up on the melee, causing many friendly fire casualties. After strenuous efforts, the leaders of both sides managed to wind down the senseless fighting by 11:00 pm. The total allied force in the combat of 18 June, if the casualties of 17 June are roughly deducted, was around 22,000, which is equal to the French forces.

=== Trebbia River – 19 June ===
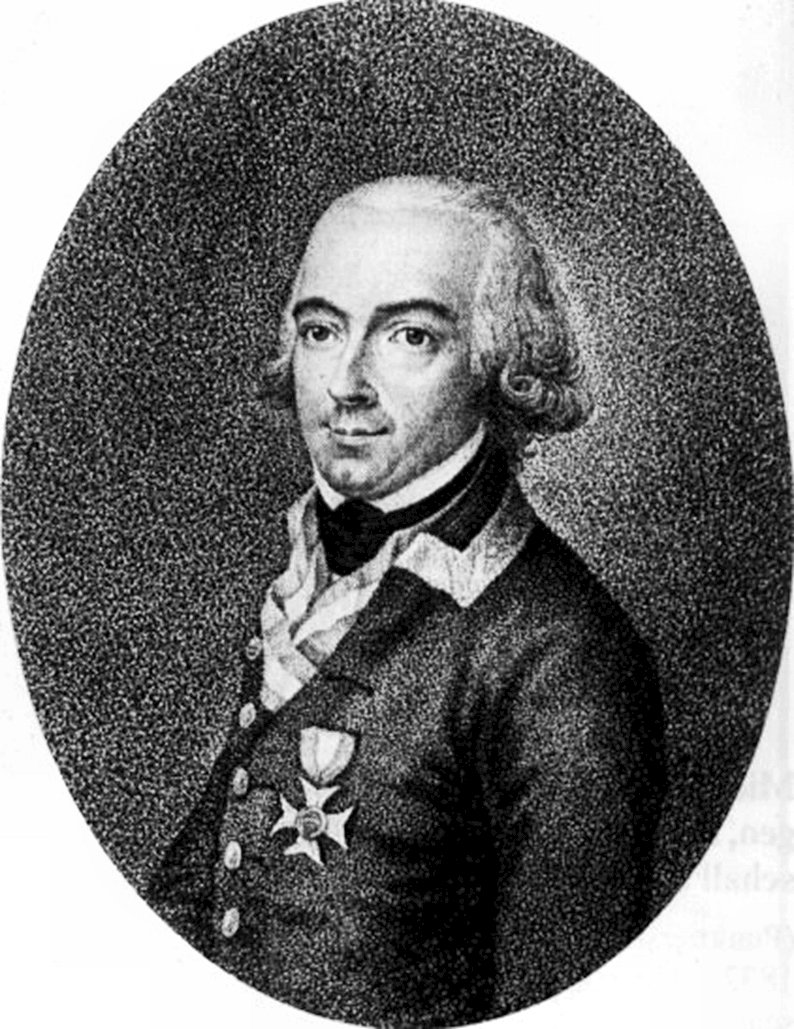
Johann von Chasteler

Chasteler sent orders for the Allied army to begin the assault at 6:00 am on 19 June. However, the plan was not delivered to Melas until 11:00 am. In the meantime, Melas noticed the presence of strong enemy forces at the north end of the battleline and sent 12 artillery pieces to the west bank of the Trebbia to blast the French positions. Two French battalions crept forward to deal with the threat, but they were discovered and driven off by the murderously effective fire of two masked cannons. Also during the morning, the French set up a battery of 10 to 12 guns and began to hammer Förster's positions. This was apparently to cover a shift to the south by a body of French troops. The delay also affected the Russian forces and Suvorov began issuing orders at 11:00 am. Meanwhile, MacDonald determined to launch an assault, putting his faith in the French soldier's enthusiasm for the attack and his troops' good morale. He still believed his army was outnumbered but he hoped to preempt an Allied assault. In the south Rusca and Victor were directed to attack side-by-side near Casaliggio, supported by an outflanking move by Dombrowski via Rivalta. Montrichard was ordered to cross the Trebbia near Gragnano in the center while Olivier was instructed to crack the Allied line farther north near San Nicolò. On the extreme right flank, Watrin and Salme were told to seize Calendasco and turn the Allied left flank.

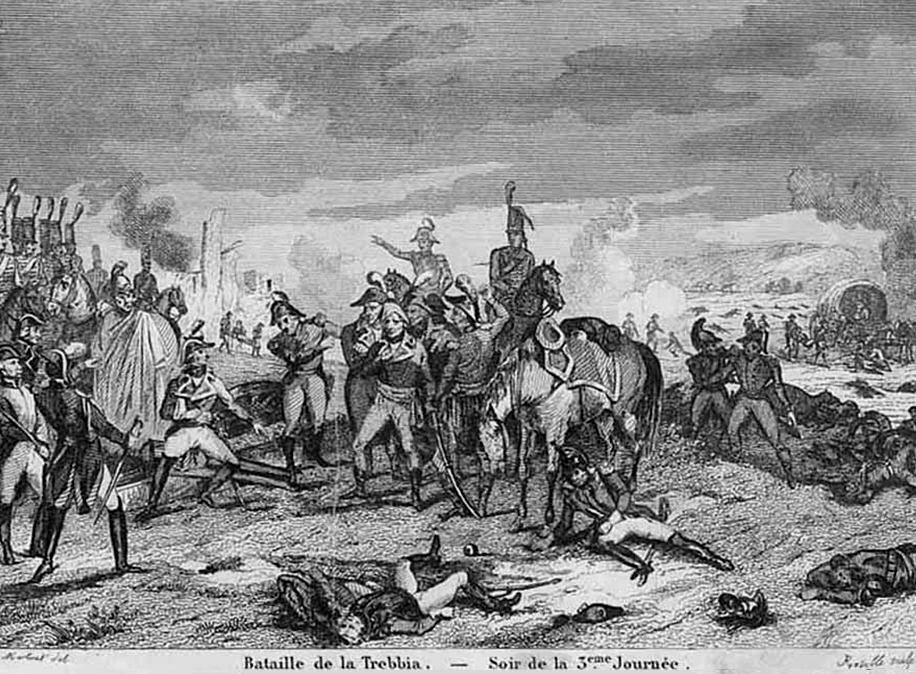
Battle of the Trebbia – Evening of the Third Day

Chasteler spotted Dombrowski's outflanking column and directed Bagration's troops against it. Dombrowski's division seized Rivalta and advanced up the Trebbia's west bank as far as the hamlet of Canetto before they ran into the Russians. Accompanied in person by Suvorov, the Russians defeated their mostly Polish opponents, who suffered serious losses. Suvorov's troops forced them to retreat to the east bank. Rusca's initial advance was blunted by the fire of 14 artillery pieces belonging to Schveikovsky's division. Farther north, Victor's division was repulsed by a combination of Schveikovsky's left wing and Förster's division and withdrew to the French-held east bank. But with Bagration's forces pulled to the south by Dombrowski's ill-fated attack, Rusca's men found a gap in the Allied line south of Casaliggio. The French infantry charged across the Trebbia while a horse artillery battery mauled the Rosenberg Grenadier Regiment. Suvorov appeared on the scene to rally his Russians. Rosenberg swung the left wing of Schveikovsky's division to face the northern edge of Rusca's breakthrough while Bagration hurried north to hit the southern edge. At the same time, Chasteler borrowed four battalions from Förster and brought them to the scene. The combined attack forced Rusca's division to retire to the east bank. The Russians tried to follow up their success but Rusca's men repelled their attacks and the fighting in the south ended around 7:00 pm.

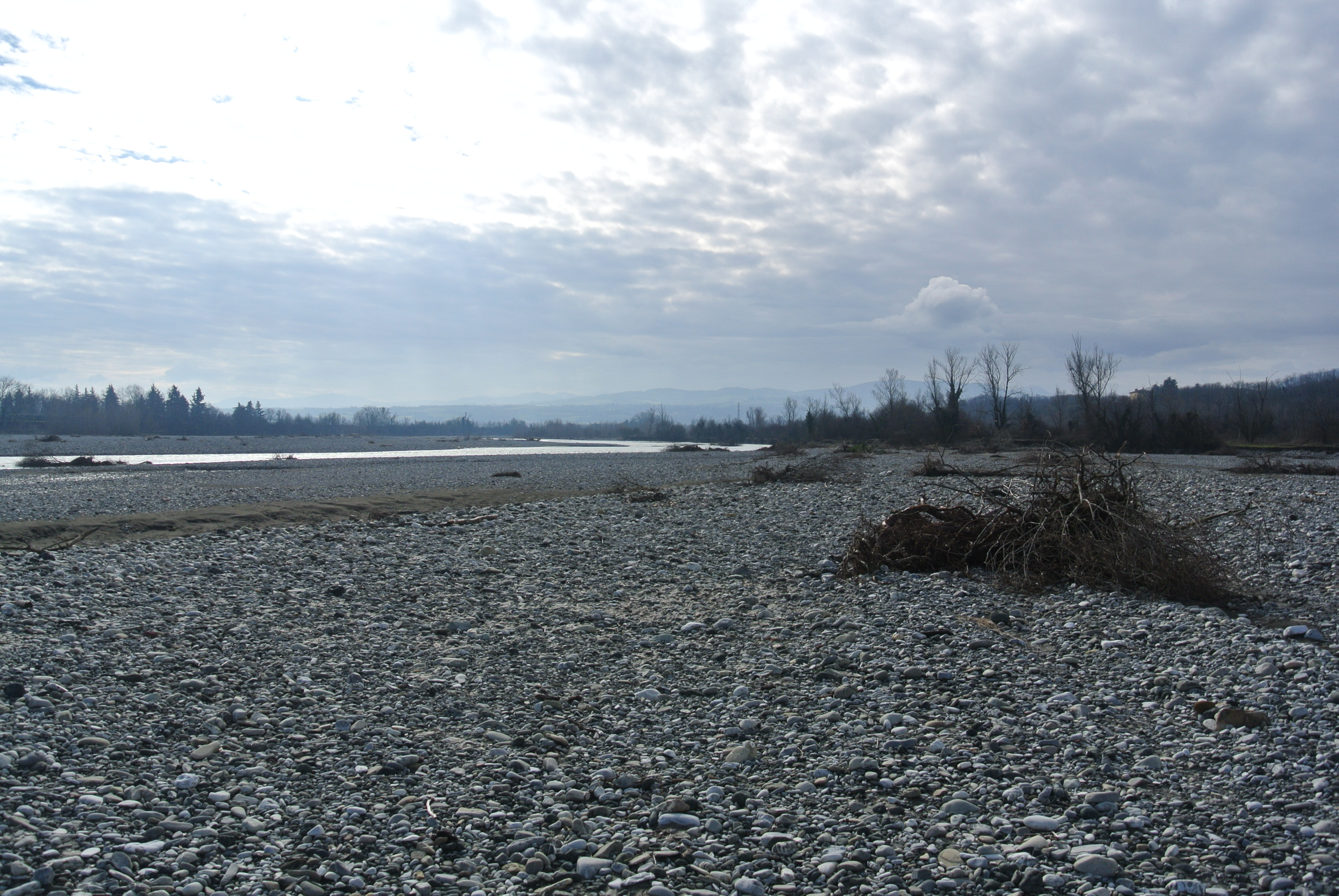
The Trebbia's river bed is filled with white stones.

The assault in the center was delayed because of the tardy arrival of Montrichard's division. Its 5th Light Infantry crossed the river and deployed into line but was hit by a devastating volley from an Austrian grenadier battalion. Montrichard's other units advanced in columns which were out of touch with each other. When Fröhlich's grenadiers and Förster's division counterattacked, Montrichard's division dissolved and its soldiers took to their heels. The grenadier battalion was swamped by fleeing Frenchmen, but it managed to keep its cohesion until some Russian infantry cut their way through to the rescue. Olivier's assault was preceded by a lightning cavalry charge around noon that swept the west bank clear of Austrians. The infantry crossed in the cavalry's wake and soon captured San Nicolò and two guns. Hearing cannon fire, Liechtenstein went forward to check on the situation and found a crowd of Austrian troops running away from Olivier's assault. He immediately went back to his command and led two squadrons each of the Lobkowitz and Levenehr Dragoons and one squadron of the Archduke Joseph Hussars against Olivier's south flank. Having disposed of Montrichard's division earlier, the Allies were free to mass against Olivier's division and eventually throw it back to the Trebbia's east bank. The Wouwermanns Grenadier Battalion recaptured two Austrian 12-pound cannons.

Around the same time that Olivier made his attack, Salme's Advanced Guard and Watrin's division, which had previously been in reserve, crossed the Trebbia on the far right flank. Moving in two bodies, the French force brushed aside the Austrian outpost line. The right thrust reached Ca' Pernici on the Po's south bank while the left thrust carried almost to Calendasco. Here Watrin paused because the noises from Olivier's fight were not encouraging. By this time, Melas had Olivier on the run and wished to attack across the Trebbia. Hearing of the Watrin-Salme incursion, the Austrian general was forced to deal with it first. Melas sent Liechtenstein with a task force composed of one squadron of the Lobkowitz Dragoons, two squadrons of the Archduke Joseph Hussars, 200 Cossacks and nine companies of infantry. Liechtenstein acted with selfless bravery – 4 horses were killed under him. Meanwhile, an artillery battery detached from the Mantua siege corps under the command of Colonel Kinsky unlimbered on the north bank of the Po. The Austrian guns proceeded to bombard their enemies, encouraging them in their decision to recross the Trebbia though the Austrians made prisoners of 300 French. The firing ended in the northern sector about 9:00 pm. The French maintained a firm grip on the west bank of the Trebbia, but MacDonald's division commanders were not able to give him any estimate of their remaining strength. In a scene of horror, thousands of dead and wounded soldiers littered the bed of the Trebbia while Piacenza's Austrian garrison blindly fired cannons into the night. Realizing that neither Moreau nor La Poype were coming to his assistance, MacDonald issued the orders to retreat at 10:00 pm. As soon as the engineers bridged the Nure River, the artillery and wagon train were sent across, followed by the infantry starting about midnight. On 19 June with 22,000 Suvorov beat 33,000 of MacDonald.

During all 3 days, the 70-year-old commander almost did not leave his horse, showed the most vigorous activity; at night he gave dispositions and other orders, and therefore was in dire need of rest—he could hardly keep on his feet; and, in spite of this, the Field Marshal cheerfully congratulated the assembled generals for the evening "of their third victory" and said: "Tomorrow we will give a fourth lesson to MacDonald". The victorious Suvorov on the 19th is depicted in Kotzebue's painting attached to the top. Orders were given to be ready for another attack by 5 am.

=== Nure River – 20 June ===
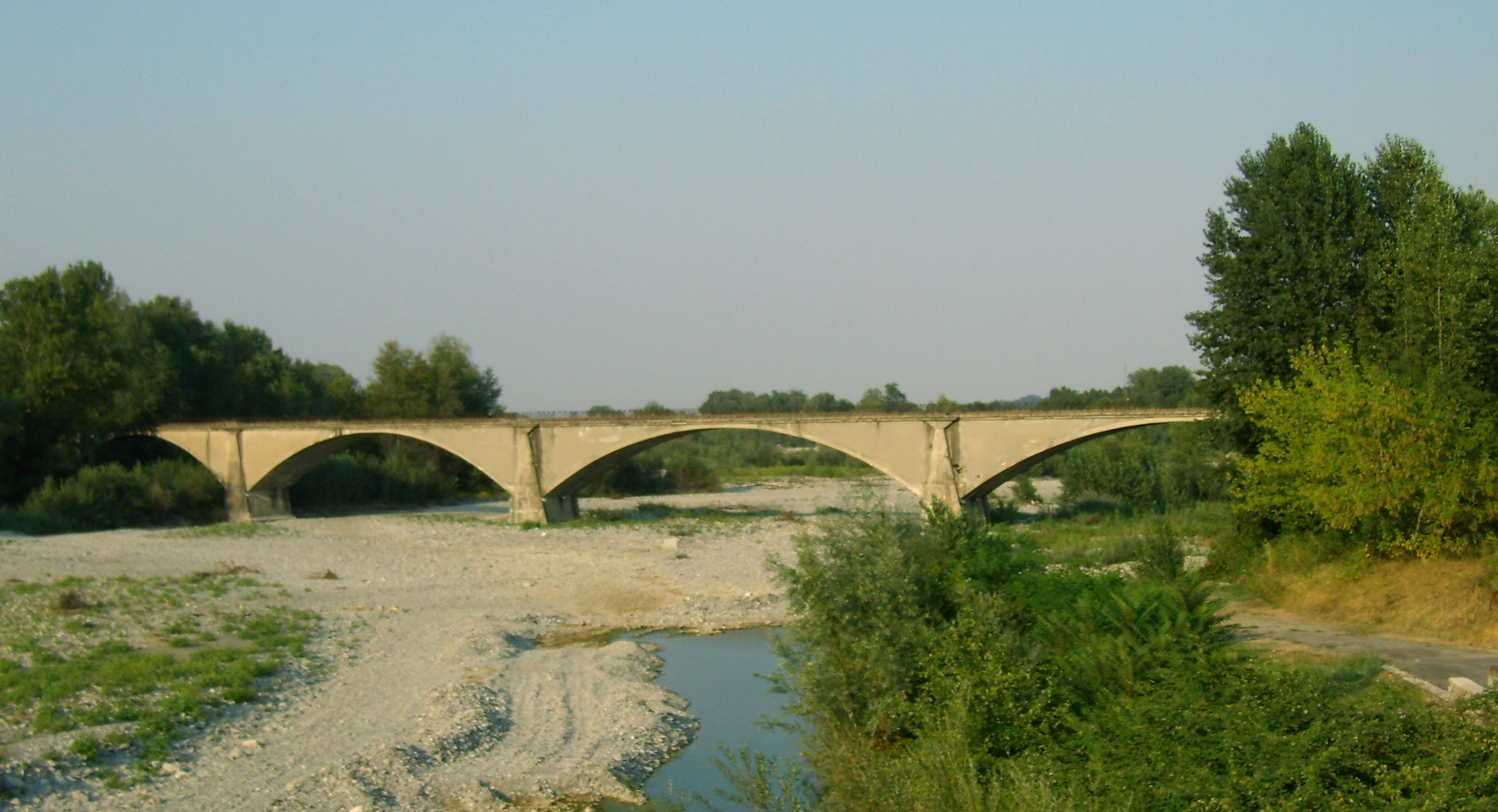
Old railway bridge over the Nure in Ponte dell'Olio

Suvorov determined to finish with the French so he ordered a new attack at 4:00 am on 20 June. When the Allied forces reached the west bank they found MacDonald's army gone. MacDonald abandoned 7,183 to 7,500 wounded men in Piacenza at the mercy of the allies; — as per Suvorov's earlier letter, 4,000. (Note: 7,183 comes from Suvorov's report to Paul (the only verifiable figures), but this is an incomplete number – as per many sources – and was apparently indicated before the Coalition forces fully captured all the French soldiers in Piacenza. In a letter to Archduke Charles, Suvorov indicates 4,000 captured wounded — it was sent to him even earlier.) The French General of Division Alexis Aimé Pierre Cambray was mortally wounded during the battle and died 2 July, General of Division Dombrowski of the Polish Legion was also wounded; Allied commanders Lieutenant General Povalo-Schveikovsky and Major General Bagration were wounded as well. The Austrians advanced into Piacenza where they found the wounded generals Olivier, Rusca and Salme along with the other non-transportable French wounded. Melas secured the town with Fröhlich's division while launching Ott to support the pursuit.

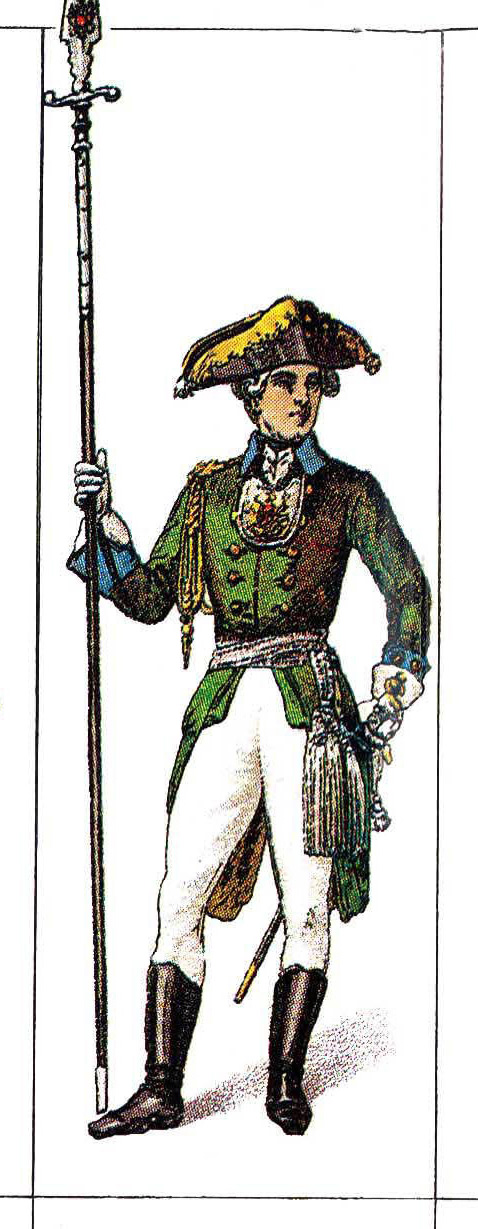
Russian officer of jaeger regiments, carrying his characteristic spontoon; uniform and equipment during Suvorov's anti-republican campaigns

The chase was headed by the Karaczay Dragoons and one battery of horse artillery. They made excellent progress until were held up farther south at San Giorgio Piacentino behind the Nure River by a substantial French rearguard, which was headed by Victor. This force comprised cavalry, some infantry, and a number of guns that were performed well; they repulsed the Austrian dragoons and 2 pieces of the horse artillery. Bagration then came up with the main body of the advance guard (under the command of Chubarov) and Chasteler deployed it for a set-piece attack on San Giorgio. The jäger regiment of Bagration on the upper Nure to the right, the jäger regiment of Miller out to the left towards San Paolo, and the four battalions of grenadiers in four lines against San Giorgio in the center. Chasteler has scarcely issued the necessary orders when Suvorov appeared at the head of the Schveikovsky's and Förster's divisions (which had united at Gossolengo), and ordered the attack to proceed. Intense musketry by 17th Light Demi-Brigade, the old Auvergne Regiment, held off the Bagration and Miller Jägers on the flanks but the combined grenadiers won a foothold in San Giorgio, and then with the help of the Russian main force they cleared the entire village. A total of 1,099 surviving French soldiers and officers surrendered along with four guns, two howitzers, and three colors. At this point any French resistance came to an end, the big four-day battle was over. The French retreated hastily. Following an unexpected fight on 20 June, Russian advance troops pursued the French almost all night long all the way to Castello di Montanaro. Over to the left the Austrian division of Ott advanced by way of San Lazzaro and Montale, but it encountered a whole French division deployed on the right bank of the Ponte Nure in front of Nure, and was held at bay until the French broke contact. Suvorov doubled his energy, all day was on horseback and only with the onset of night stopped together with the Grand Duke Constantine. Suvorov, neglecting his military theory, came to the conviction that no more could be demanded and resolved to give the men a rest. MacDonald's intercepted letter to Moreau and Victor's repulsed correspondence convinced him that the damage done to the French was too great to be soon repaired. "MacDonald is more than defeated," he wrote to Kray.

The battle at the Trebbia took place on the very places where, in 218 B.C., Hannibal had defeated the Romans. Suvorov was very proud of this coincidence, talked about it with enthusiasm and turned to an Austrian general with a question, why Hannibal did not go from the Trebbia directly to Rome. The latter replied that there was probably also a Hofkriegsrat in Carthage. The joke must have pleased Suvorov, as Petrushevsky notes.

== Result ==
=== Casualties ===
The Army of Naples withdrew southeast toward Parma where 200 wounded soldiers were abandoned. The French losses may have been over 16,000 when the killed, transportable wounded (that were smaller in number than the untransportable ones), prisoners, including captured wounded, and missing were counted. The Russians reported 681 killed and 2,073 wounded for a total of 2,754 while the Austrians admitted losing 254 killed, 1,903 wounded and 500 missing for a total of 2,657. Historian Christopher Duffy rounded these figures up to 6,000 Allied casualties. He assumed French casualties at 12,000 based on the only verifiable figure of 7,183 wounded prisoners in Piacenza, but these figures do not include casualties on 20 June and contain only killed, wounded, and missing. When added up with the previously quoted captured in the combat of 20 June (the sole survivors of the 17th Demi-Brigade), the result is 13,099. Duffy claimed as well that MacDonald's defeat and his subsequent retreat from the battlefield cost France the loss of about 21,000 troops. Gaston Bodart in his statistics listed 5,500 Allied casualties including 1,000 killed, 4,000 wounded, and 500 captured; and 16,500 French casualties: 2,000 killed, 7,500 wounded (most of them became prisoners on 20 June) plus 7,000 men captured or missing (these 7,000 do not contain wounded prisoners in Piacenza); seven guns and eight colors were lost. Digby Smith reported similar Allied and French losses, he too included three Russian generals wounded. From a total of 33,000 French, he estimated losses as 2,000 died, 7,500 injured, and 7,000 prisoners. In the 2nd edition of his book, Suvorov's biographer Alexander Petrushevsky estimated total Allied casualties at 5,500–6,000; the French casualties at 15,000 and noted that it is the minimal loss. This estimate does not take into an account missing men, unlike some assessments. In proportion to the wounded, the number of dead "could not be less than 2,000–3,000" (the first edition stated 2,500–3,000 (Note: Acerbi's numbers are the same.)), more than 12,500 wounded or captured (12,268 captured in all according to the most recent letter of Suvorov), thereof more than 7,500 captured wounded and sick in Piacenza. He also said that highest number of allies who fought did not exceed 30,000 during the first three days (the first edition said the number was under 30,000). David Eggenberger wrote about 4,000 killed and 12,000 wounded, captured, missing among 35,000 French, and 6,000 casualties among the Russo-Austrian allies. Carl von Clausewitz stated that the French losses in killed and wounded left on the battlefield amounted to between 3,000 and 4,000, in prisoners and wounded prisoners between 12,000 and 13,000, and the total together with these amounted to 16,000; including sick and infirm, around 18,500. Lyon Blease stated that the French had lost about 17,000 men, including 12,000 prisoners in all and 7,500 prisoners at Piacenza and 1,700 Polish legionaries out of 2,000; the total Allied loss could not have exceeded 6,000. Gunther E. Rothenberg gave Allied losses as 5,000 killed or wounded and 500 captured out of 20,000 Russians and 17,000 Austrians. He stated French losses as 9,500 killed or wounded and 7,000 captured out of 33,000. N. A. Orlov wrote of 16–18,000 French losses with 4–6,000 killed; the rest were prisoners or abandoned wounded in the Piacenza hospital. The Russians and Austrians lost up to 5,425 men dead, injured, and missing in action. In the 4th edition of their book, R. Ernest Dupuy and Trevor N. Dupuy revised the losses to 11,500 French casualties between June 17 and 19 (the first edition stated 10,000), as well as 5,500 Allied losses (the first edition stated 7,000), and asserted that 5,000 French were casualties en route (while MacDonald was trying to connect with Moreau in Genoa), — but it is not clear whether this includes Frenchmen from Piacenza. Spencer C. Tucker gave the same number of 11,500 losses of the French, but even from 17 to 18 June, (Note: Probably a typo.) excluding the combat of 19 June and the combat of the Nure, and also indicated an additional loss of 5,000 MacDonald's forces when he tried to link up with Moreau's army. Tucker put 5,500 allied casualties. Micheal Clodfelter noted 1,600 French killed and 7,685 wounded, 9,285 in total, and also an additional loss of 5,000 men after 19 June with no indication of prisoners or missing; 14,285 as the French total. Russian losses are indicated at 680 killed, 722 wounded, and he estimated Austrian losses at 254 killed, 1,903 wounded, 500 missing. Total Allied loss: 4,059 men.

By June 22, out of 35,000 French, barely 10,000 to 12,000 men remained in their positions, completely demoralized. MacDonald had lost 23–25,000 of his 35,000 troops, i.e. two-thirds (these losses also consist of deserters and stragglers). Duffy notes that when MacDonald linked up with Moreau's 12,000-strong army, their combined force was scarcely 24–25,000 men. Altogether, up to 60 guns were abandoned by the French during this withdrawal. Suvorov, meanwhile, received the victory title of Prince Italiysky for his victory at the Trebbia. The old Field Marshal taught:

Pursue day and night, until he be destroyed.

=== Further steps ===
The Allies pursued the French until 21 June, reaching Fiorenzuola where they rested the next day. Suvorov determined from captured dispatches that MacDonald's mangled army was no longer a threat to northern Italy and marched the Allied army back west on the 23rd, hoping to catch Moreau between himself and Bellegarde. Ott with 7,000 foot, 2,000 horse and 15 guns continued the pursuit, keeping an eye on the French army. MacDonald, scattering his forces once again, ordered Montrichard's division to the east where it was used to form some garrisons which were subsequently captured. One battalion of Warasdiner Grenz and one squadron of the Bussy Mounted Jägers tried to block MacDonald's retreat but were crushed on 24 June at Sassuolo south of Modena.

By 28 June the Army of Naples was back at Pistoia where it stayed for several days before marching to the west coast in early July. The still ailing MacDonald was shipped off to France and replaced in command by Laurent Gouvion Saint-Cyr. The garrisons in south and central Italy were picked off one-by-one by the Allies. Naples surrendered on 15 June, Fort Elmo in Naples harbor on 11 July, Capua on 28 July, Gaeta on 1 August, Rome on 29 September and Ancona on 13 November 1799. Even the French-held fortresses of northern Italy fell rapidly. Turin capitulated on 20 June, Bologna on 3 July, Fort Urbano on 10 July, Alessandria on 22 July and Mantua on 28 July.

Besides the combat of the Nure, the Second Battle of Marengo (Battle of Cascina Grossa) took place on 20 June, and the next major engagement was the Battle of Novi on 15 August 1799.

== See also ==
- Capture of Brescia
- Battle of Cassano
- Battle of Bassignana
- First Battle of Marengo
- Battle of Modena
- Second Battle of Marengo
- Battle of Novi
- Battle of the Gotthard Pass
- Battle of the Klöntal
- Battle of the Muotatal

== Sources ==
- Broughton, Tony (2006). "Generals Who Served in the French Army during the Period 1789-1815: Cabannes de Puymisson to Cazals". The Napoleon Series.
- Clausewitz, Carl von. Napoleon Absent, Coalition Ascendant: The 1799 Campaign in Italy and Switzerland, Volume 1. Trans and ed. Nicholas Murray and Christopher Pringle. Lawrence, Kansas: University Press of Kansas (2020). ISBN 978-0-7006-3025-7
  - Clausewitz, Carl von (1833). Die Feldzüge von 1799 in Italien und der Schweiz (in German). Vol. 1. University of Lausanne: F. Dümmler.
- Clodfelter, M. (2017). Warfare and Armed Conflicts: A Statistical Encyclopedia of Casualty and Other Figures, 1492-2015 (4th ed.). Jefferson, North Carolina: McFarland. ISBN 978-0-7864-7470-7.
- Longworth, Philip (1966). The Art of Victory: The Life and Achievements of Field-Marshal Suvorov, 1729–1800. New York: Holt, Rinehart and Winston.
- Duffy, Christopher (1999). Eagles Over the Alps: Suvorov in Italy and Switzerland, 1799. Chicago, Ill.: Emperor's Press. ISBN 1-883476-18-6. OCLC 42694091.
- Dupuy, Trevor N.; Dupuy, R. Ernest (1970). The Encyclopedia of Military History from 3500 BC to the Present. New York: Harper & Row. ISBN 0-06-011139-9. OCLC 71235.
  - Dupuy, Trevor N.; Dupuy, R. Ernest (1 January 1977). The Encyclopedia of Military History from 3500 BC to the Present, Revised Edition. New York: Harper. ISBN 978-0060111397.
  - Dupuy, Trevor N.; Dupuy, R. Ernest (1 January 1986). The Encyclopedia of Military History from 3500 BC to the Present, 2nd Revised Edition. New York: Harper & Row. ISBN 978-0061812354.
  - Dupuy, Trevor N.; Dupuy, R. Ernest (1 April 1993). The Harper Encyclopedia of Military History (4th ed.). New York: HarperCollins. ISBN 978-0004701431.
- Nafziger, George. French Army of Naples, 8 June 1799 (PDF). United States Army Combined Arms Center. Archived from the original (PDF) on 15 June 2010.
- Rothenberg, Gunther E. (1978). The Art of Warfare in the Age of Napoleon. Bloomington, Ind.: Indiana University Press. ISBN 0-253-31076-8. OCLC 3272721.
  - Rothenberg, Gunther (1980). The Art of Warfare in the Age of Napoleon. Bloomington: Indiana University Press. ISBN 0253202604.
- Smith, Digby (1998). The Greenhill Napoleonic Wars Data Book. London Mechanicsburg, PA: Greenhill Books Stackpole Books. ISBN 1-85367-276-9. OCLC 37616149.
- Eggenberger, David (1985). An Encyclopedia of Battles. New York: Dover Publications. ISBN 0-486-24913-1.
- Tucker, Spencer C. (2009). A Global Chronology of Conflict: From the Ancient World to the Modern Middle East [6 volumes]: From the Ancient World to the Modern Middle East. ABC-CLIO. ISBN 978-1851096725.
- Blease, Lyon (1920). Suvorof. London: Constable & Co Ltd.
- Spalding, Henry (1890). Suvóroff (1st ed.). London: Chapman and Hall.
- Mikaberidze, Alexander (2003). The Lion of the Russian Army. Florida State University.
- Rickard, John (5 February 2009). "Battle of the Trebbia, 17-19 June 1799".
- Acerbi, Enrico (July 2008). "The 1799 Campaign in Italy: The Battle of Trebbia -- June 1799 Part II: The Three Day Battle at the Trebbia -- The Second Day and the Prince Liechtenstein's Cavalry Charge". napoleon-series.org. The Napoleon Series.
- Bodart, Gaston (1908). Militär-historisches Kriegs-Lexikon (1618-1905) (in German). Vienna and Leipzig: C. W. Stern.
- Petrushevsky, Alexander F. (1900). "Итальянская кампания; Треббиа; 1799". Generalissimo Prince Suvorov (in Russian). St. Petersburg: Типография М. М. Стасюлевича.
- Orlov, Nikolay Aleksandrovich (1892). Разбор военных действий Суворова в Италии в 1799 году [Analysis of Suvorov's military actions in Italy in 1799] (in Russian). St. Petersburg: Тип. Тренке и Фюсно. ISBN 9785998994289.
- Milyutin, Dmitry (1852). История войны России с Францией в царствование Императора Павла I в 1799 году [The history of Russia's war with France during the reign of Emperor Paul I in 1799] (in Russian). Vol. II. St. Petersburg: Типография штаба военно-учебных заведений.
- Elchaninov, Andrey Georgievich (2003). История русской армии от зарождения Руси до войны 1812 г. [History of the Russian army from the origination of Rus' to the War of 1812] (in Russian). St. Petersburg: Полигон. ISBN 5-89173-205-X.
- Arsenyev, Konstantin; Petrushevsky, Fyodor (1901). Brockhaus and Efron Encyclopedic Dictionary (in Russian). Vol. XXXIIIа. Томбигби — Трульский собор. Friedrich A. Brockhaus (Leipzig), Ilya A. Efron (St. Petersburg).
- Myachin, Aleksandr Nikolaevich (2001). 100 великих битв [100 Great Battles] (in Russian). Moscow: Вече. pp. 173–176. ISBN 5-7838-0233-6.
- Novitsky, Vasily F.; Schwartz, Alexey V. von; Apushkin, Vladimir A.; Schoultz, Gustav K. von (1911). Военная энциклопедия Сытина [Sytin Military Encyclopedia] (in Russian). Vol. IV: Б – Бомба. Moscow: Типография Т-ва И. Д. Сытина. pp. 328–331.
  - Velichko, Konstantin; Novitsky, Vasily; Schwartz, Alexey von; Apushkin, Vladimir; Schoultz, Gustav von (1915). Sytin Military Encyclopedia (in Russian). Vol. XVIII. Паукер – Порт-Артур. Moscow: Тип. Т-ва И. Д. Сытина. pp. 473–474.
- Rostunov, Ivan I. (1989). Генералиссимус Александр Васильевич Суворов: Жизнь и полководческая деятельность [Generalissimo Alexander Suvorov: Life and military activity] (in Russian). Moscow: Voenizdat. ISBN 5-203-00046-8.
- Skałkowski, Adam (1939–1946). "Jan Henryk Dąbrowski". Polski Słownik Biograficzny [Polish Biographical Dictionary] (in Polish). Vol. V.

Preceded by First Battle of Zurich	French Revolution: Revolutionary campaigns Battle of Trebbia (1799)	Succeeded by Battle of Cascina Grossa
