= Combat of Bobbio =

1799 battle of the Second Coalition war

- Part of the Italian campaigns during the war of the Second Coalition
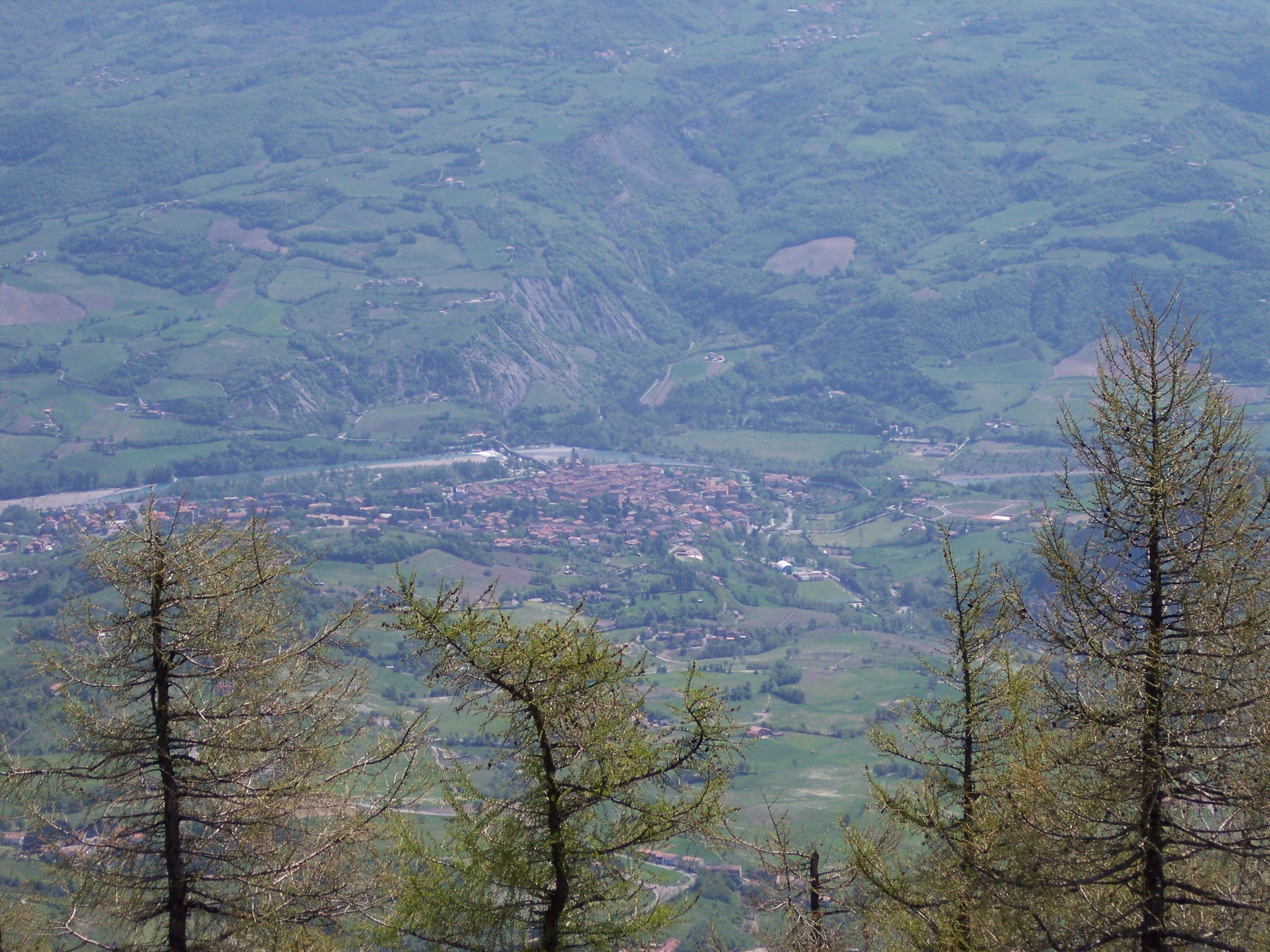
- Bobbio – view from Monte Penice
Date	21 June 1799 (Note: Old Style date: 10 June 1799)
Location	Bobbio, Northern Italy
Result	Russo-Austrian victory

Belligerents
Russia; Austria	France; • Liguria

Commanders and leaders
(Russian Empire) Mikhail Veletsky	(French First Republic) Jean La Poype

Strength
700; • (Russian Empire) 1 battalion; • (Russian Empire) 50 Cossacks; • (Habsburg monarchy) 80 dragoons	3,000–3,500 militia (Note: Estimates: • 3,000; • 3,300; • 3,500); • (Republic of Genoa) 2,000; • (French First Republic) 1,500

Casualties and losses
Unknown	Heavy, incl. 100+ captured

The combat of Bobbio occurred on 21 June [O.S. 10 June] 1799 near Bobbio town in the course of the war of the Second Coalition. In the combat Russian regular battalion from the Jung-Baden regiment and Austrian dragoons from the Karaczay regiment (the commanders of the regiments themselves did not participate in action), together with the Russian Cossacks, fought and won under the command of the Russian Major General Mikhail Mikhailovich Veletsky against the mixed Franco-Ligurian militia of the French General Jean François Cornu de La Poype.

== Action development ==
In order to strengthen Étienne Macdonald, Jean Moreau proposed to secure the left flank of Macdonald's army from the Apennines, Moreau agreed to send 3,300+ troops from Ligurian Legion of Genoa, under the command of La Poype, along the Trebbia valley to Bibbio. Moreau had about 14,000 left, and Macdonald would have 35,600 men.

Macdonald was not worried about an outcome of the battle of the Trebbia, which was taking place before. He counted Alexander Suvorov to be smaller in number than he was and expected any minute Moreau's troops and La Poype to come out on the flank and rear of Field Marshal Suvorov.

During Macdonald's retreat on 20 June, La Poype's enterprise ended in failure. On 16 June, with 3,300+ Ligurian legionaries, he reached the city of Bobbio, but remained inactive. Having received Macdonald's order to advance, he set out on June 19, but not along the Trebbia valley as necessary, an advantageous direction, but along the Nure; he moved slowly and only on June 20 approached San Giorgio Piacentino. La Poype's movement attracted Suvorov's attention, so that on June 21 he sent back 2 Cossack regiments to cover the army's supply trains. But La Poype did not even think about attacking. Having learned of Macdonald's fate, he withdrew to Bobbio, which at that time was already occupied by Veletsky, sent by Suvorov earlier. La Poype thought to defeat the Russians, taking advantage of the numerical superiority of his militia; but Veletsky himself, with a regular battalion, assaulted and routed him. The Ligurian remnants saved themselves, scattering along the mountain paths in small parties.

== Sources ==
- Duffy, Christopher (1999). Eagles Over the Alps: Suvorov in Italy and Switzerland, 1799. Chicago, Ill.: Emperor's Press. ISBN 1-883476-18-6. OCLC 42694091.
- Orlov, Nikolay Aleksandrovich (1892). Разбор военных действий Суворова в Италии в 1799 году [Analysis of Suvorov's military actions in Italy in 1799] (in Russian). St. Petersburg: Тип. Тренке и Фюсно.
- Petrushevsky, Alexander Fomich (1884). "Итальянская кампания: Треббиа; 1799" [Italian Campaign: Trebbia; 1799]. Генералиссимус князь Суворов [Generalissimo Prince Suvorov] (in Russian). Vol. 3 (1st ed.). Типография М. М. Стасюлевича.
- Milyutin, Dmitry Alekseyevich (1852). История войны России с Францией в царствование Императора Павла I в 1799 году [The history of Russia's war with France during the reign of Emperor Paul I in 1799] (in Russian). Vol. II. St. Petersburg: Типография штаба военно-учебных заведений.
