= Yakov Povalo-Shveikovsky =

Russian general of the infantry

His Excellency Yakov Ivanovich Povalo-Shveikovsky
- Яковъ Ивановичъ Повало-Швейковскій
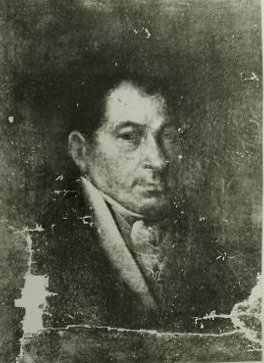
- Ya. I. Povalo-Shveikovsky

Governing Senate
- In office 1801–posthumously
- Monarchs: Paul I Alexander I

Personal details
- Born: 20 October 1750
- Died: 9 October 1807 (aged 56) Saint Petersburg, Saint Petersburg Governorate
- Relations: House of Povalo-Shveikovsky
- Awards: Order of St. Alexander Nevsky; Order of St. John of Jerusalem

Military service
- Allegiance: Russia
- Branch/service: Imperial Russian Army
- Rank: General of the Infantry
- Battles/wars: Russo-Turkish War; Siege of Ochakov; War of the Second Coalition; Italian and Swiss expedition; Action of the Oglio River; Battle of the Adda River; Battle of the Trebbia; Battle of Novi; Battle of the Klöntal; Battle of Glarus

Yakov Ivanovich Povalo-Shveikovsky (Shveykovsky, Schveikovsky; Russian: Яков Иванович Повало-Швейковский, romanized: Yakov Ivanovič Povalo-Šveykovskiy; (Note: Pre-1918 Russian orthography: Яковъ Ивановичъ Повало-Швейковскій) October 20, (Note: Old Style: Oct. 9) 1750 – October 9, (Note: O.S.: Sep. 27) 1807) was a Russian General of the Infantry (then the acting Privy Councillor).

== Biography ==
Povalo-Shveikovsky, who belonged to a family from the Grand Duchy of Lithuania (the family came into Russian allegiance after the conquest of Smolensk in 1654), began his service in the Semyonovsky Life Guards Regiment as a corporal (1768) and in 1771 was promoted to officer in the Novgorod Infantry Regiment.

In 1778 he was transferred to the Preobrazhensky Life Guards Regiment as a captain, in 1784 he was appointed colonel in the Ukrainian Light Horse Regiment, commanding which he was at the siege of Ochakov.

In 1789 Povalo was a brigadier, in 1791 — major-general and chief of the Smolensk Musketeer Regiment, in 1798 — lieutenant-general, in 1799 — General of the Infantry Povalo participated with distinction in Suvorov's Italian campaign: in the affair at the river Oglio, commanding a detachment, he forced to retreat the French who prevented the passage of his troops across this river (22 April 1799); at Lecco and on the river Adda defeated a French detachment (26 April); on the march to Milan forced another French detachment to surrender (28 April); occupied Valenza (20 May); commanded a division in the affairs at the rivers Tidone and Trebia, at which he was wounded (17–20 June); with a 10,000-strong corps of Russo-Austrian troops covered the siege of the Serravalle fortress (July–August); at Novi he commanded a regiment and withstood the attacks of his enemy for a whole day, repelling them with success (15 August).

Since the Russian troops' entry into Switzerland Povalo was a duty general in the army. Awards for the Italian campaign were: the rank of General of the Infantry, the Order of St. Alexander Nevsky and St. John of Jerusalem. In April 1800, Povalo was appointed military governor of Kiev, but in the same year "for a false report" dismissed by Emperor Paul I from service. Accepted by him (5 February 1801) again in the service, Povalo was renamed an acting Privy Councillor and appointed Senator, in which position he died.

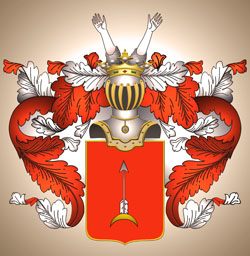
Coat of Arms of the Povalo-Shveikovsky family

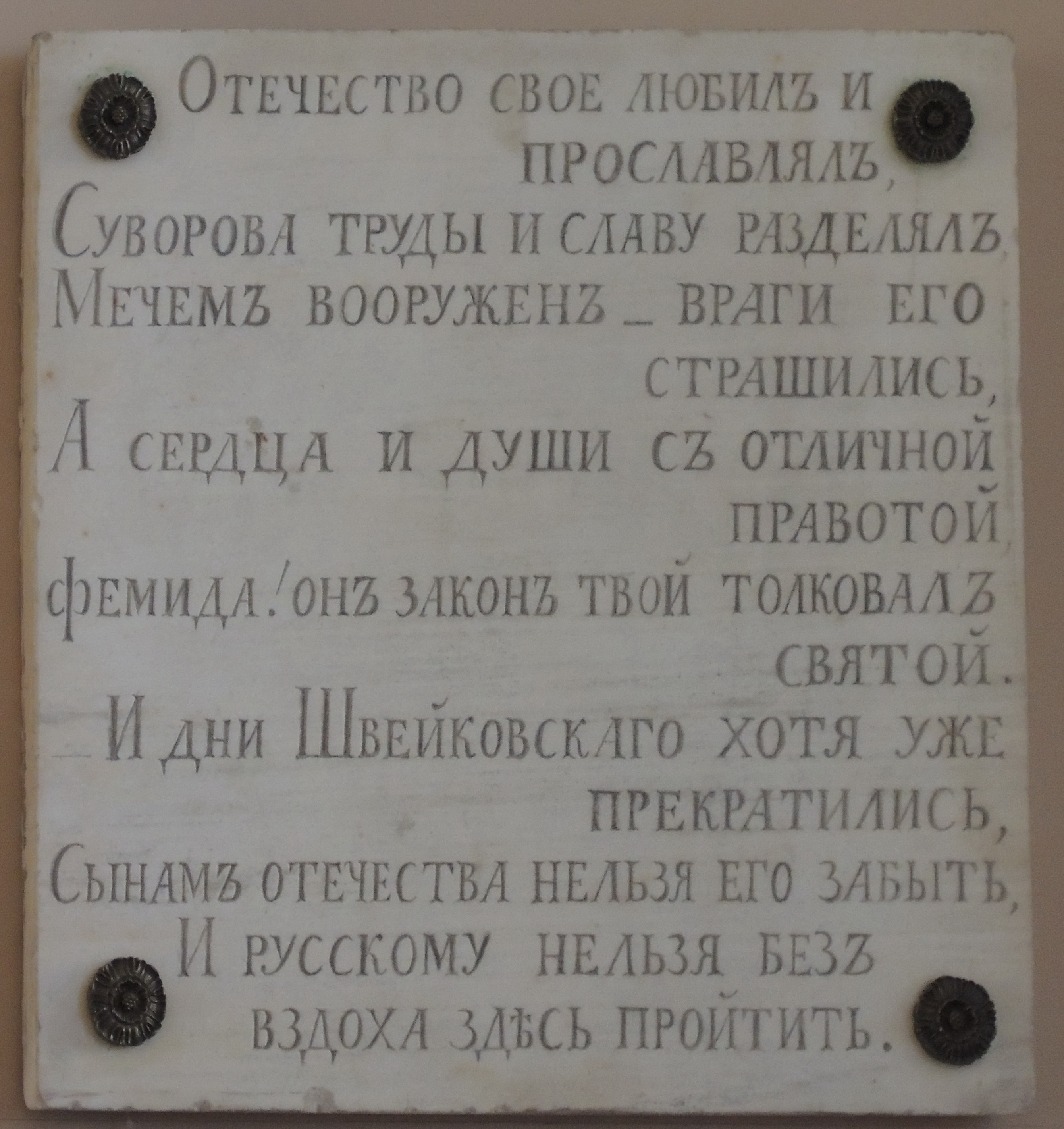
Annunciation Church of the Alexander Nevsky Lavra, St. Petersburg. A slab with a poetic epitaph. Transferred from the monument at the Lazarevskoe Cemetery. He loved and glorified his fatherland, He shared Suvorov's labours and glory, Armed with a sword _ his enemies were afraid of him, And the heart and soul with excellent righteousness, Themis! He was interpreting Your holy law. Though the days of Shveikovsky are over, He cannot be forgotten by the fatherland's sons, And a Russian cannot pass here without a sigh.

== Bibliography ==
- Velichko, Konstantin I.; Novitsky, Vasily F.; Schwartz, Aleksey V. von; Apushkin, Vladimir A.; Schoultz, Gustav K. von (1915). Военная энциклопедия Сытина [Sytin Military Encyclopedia] (in Russian). Vol. XVIII. Паукер – Порт-Артур. Moscow: Типография Т-ва И. Д. Сытина. pp. 473–474.
- Polovtsov, Alexander (1905). Russian Biographical Dictionary. Vol. 14: Плавильщиков—Примо. Saint Petersburg: Типография И. Н. Скороходова. pp. 148–149.
- Arsenyev, Konstantin; Petrushevsky, Fyodor (1898). Brockhaus and Efron Encyclopedic Dictionary (in Russian). Vol. 46. Петропавловский – Поватажное. Friedrich A. Brockhaus (Leipzig), Ilya A. Yefron (St. Petersburg). p. 955.
