= Alexander Petrushevsky =

Russian military historian

- Александр Петрушевский
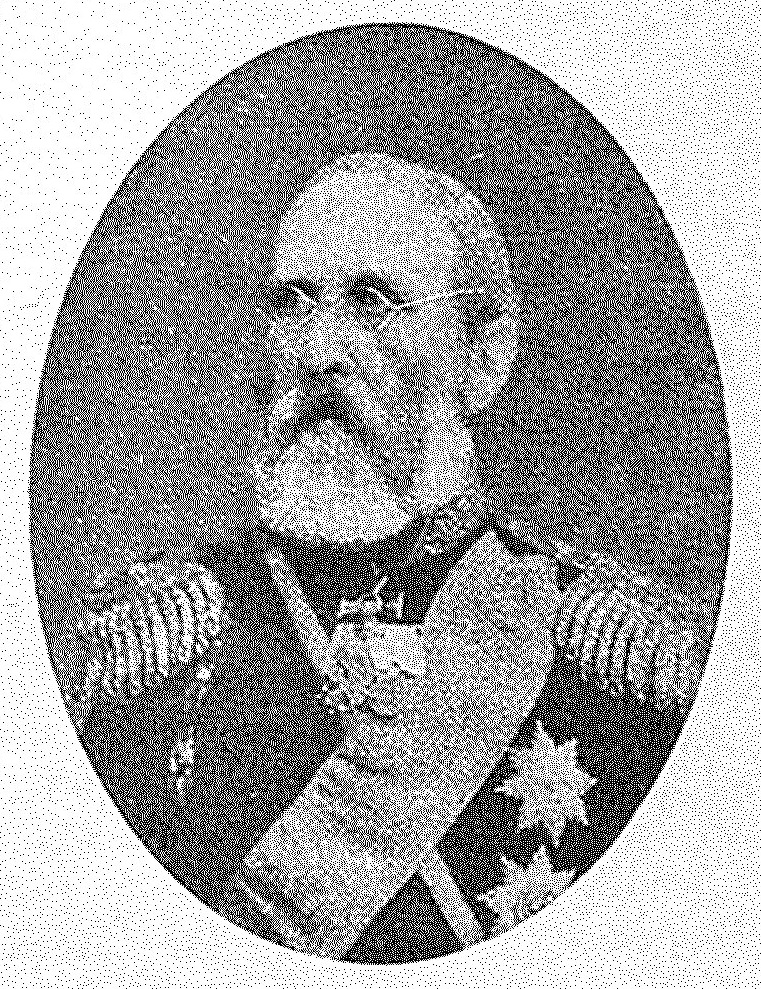
- General-Lieutenant A. F. Petrushevsky. "Sytin Military Encyclopedia" (St. Petersburg, 1911–1915)
- Pronunciation: aɭʲiksˈɑndr pʲitruʃˈɛfskʲij
- Born: Alexander Fomich Petrushevsky; 25 February 1826 (Note: New Style date)
- Died: April 2, 1904 (aged 78) (Note: New Style date)
- Citizenship: Russia
- Occupation: Military history
- Years active: 1857–1900
- Notable work: Generalissimo Prince Suvorov
- Honours: • Macarius Prize; • Honorary Member of the General Staff Academy; • Honorary Member of the St. Petersburg Literacy Committee; • First Prizes of the St. Petersburg Literacy Committee; • Gold Kiselyov medals of the Scientific Committee of the Ministry of State Property
- Military career
- Service years: 1844–1887
- Rank: General-lieutenant
- Education: The Noble Regiment

Alexander Fomich Petrushevsky (Russian: Александр Фомич Петрушевский, romanized: Aleksandr Fomich Petrushevskiy; pre-1918 Russian orthography: Александръ Ѳомичъ Петрушевскій) was a Russian lieutenant-general and a well-known biographer of Suvorov.

== Life ==
Born in 1826, after graduating from the Noble Regiment in 1844 was promoted to warrant officer in the field artillery, enrolled in the Guards Artillery, served in the Main Artillery Directorate and finished his service as manager of the Main Hospital Committee. In 1863 he was promoted to colonel, in 1870 — to major-general, in 1879 — to lieutenant-general, between 1886 and 1887 he retired due to illness. He died in 1902.

Petrushevsky was an active member of the St. Petersburg Literacy Committee.

== Works ==
- Petrushevsky is known for his capital work Generalissimo Prince Suvorov (Russian: Генералиссимус князь Суворов, romanized: Generalissimus Knyaz' Suvorov; 3 vols.), which was awarded by the Imperial Academy of Sciences the 1st Macarius Prize and had two editions (1884 and 1900); for the same work the Nicholas General Staff Academy elected Petrushevsky its honorary member (1901). This biography is based on sources that are largely manuscript and have remained unknown until then.

A supplement to this work is:

- Petrushevsky's article in Russian Mind (1887, No. 5);
- The significance of Suvorov for his and our time (Russian: Значение Суворова для его и нашего времени) and an extract from it for popular reading under the title Stories about Suvorov (Russian: Рассказы про Суворова; St. Petersburg, 1885; 2nd ed., 1891).

In addition, Petrushevsky wrote a number of articles (On the scientific education of Feuerwerker (Russian: О научном образовании фейерверкеров), Artillery Magazine (Russian: Артиллерийский журнал), 1857, No. 5; On the education of lower ranks (Russian: Об образовании нижних чинов), Artillery Magazine, 1859; On the free sale of gunpowder and the provision of saltpeter (Russian: О вольной продаже пороха и заготовлении селитры), Artillery Magazine, 1868, Nos. 5 and 6, etc.) and published a number of popular and educational books for troops and people:

- Russian ABC for soldiers (Russian: Русская азбука для солдат) and Prescriptions for soldiers (Russian: Прописи для солдат) (St. Petersburg, 1859);
- Stories about the old time in Russia (Russian: Рассказы про старое время на Руси; St. Petersburg, 1866, 12 ed.);
- Tale of Alexander Nevsky (Russian: Сказание об Александре Невском; St. Petersburg, 1867; 2 ed.);
- Stories about Peter the Great (Russian: Рассказы про Петра Великого; St. Petersburg, 1885, 7 ed.);
- and others.

For the last three works the author was twice awarded by the Literacy Committee — first prizes, and by the Scientific Committee of the Ministry of State Property — gold medals.

In 1864 Petrushevsky, together with I. S. Kuznetsov, printed, without authors' names, Good reading of Orthodox Christians (Russian: Доброе чтение православных), which was published in 5 editions.

== Sources ==
- Velichko, Konstantin I.; Novitsky, Vasily F.; Schwartz, Aleksey V. von; Apushkin, Vladimir A.; Schoultz, Gustav K. von (1915). "Военная энциклопедия Сытина" ["Sytin Military Encyclopedia"] (in Russian). Vol. 18. Паукер – Порт-Артур. Moscow: Типография Т-ва И. Д. Сытина. pp. 398–399.
- Arsenyev, Konstantin; Petrushevsky, Fyodor (1898). Brockhaus and Efron Encyclopedic Dictionary (in Russian). Vol. 46. Петропавловский – Поватажное. Friedrich A. Brockhaus (Leipzig), Ilya A. Efron (St. Petersburg). p. 478.
