= Christopher Duffy =

British military historian (1936–2022)

Christopher Duffy (1936 – 16 November 2022) was a British military historian.

Duffy read history at Balliol College, Oxford, where he graduated in 1961 with the DPhil. Afterwards, he taught military history at the Royal Military Academy Sandhurst and the college of the British General Staff. He was secretary-general of the British Commission for Military History and vice-president of the Military History Society of Ireland. From 1996 to 2001, he was research professor at the De Montfort University, Leicester. He then worked as a freelance author.

Duffy's special interest was the military history of the European modern age, in particular the history of the German, Prussian, Russian and Austrian armed forces. He wrote two books on the Jacobite Rising in Scotland in 1745. He was most famous for his writings about Frederick the Great and the Seven Years' War. Duffy was fluent in six languages and published some twenty books about military history topics, several of which have been translated into German.

Duffy died on 16 November 2022, at the age of 86.

== Works ==
- The Wild Goose and the Eagle: A Life of Marshal von Browne, 1705-1757, Chatto & Windus, 1964.
- Borodino and the War of 1812, Sphere, 1972. Scribner, 1973. ISBN 0684131730 OCLC 653367
- The Army of Frederick the Great , David & Charles, 1974, ISBN 0858851385. (Superseded by an illustrated second edition in 1996, ISBN 188347602X.)
- Fire and Stone: The Science of Fortress Warfare, 1660-1860, David & Charles, 1975, ISBN 0715365576.
- The Army of Maria Theresa: The Armed Forces of Imperial Austria, 1740-1780, Vancouver 1977, ISBN 0715373870. (Superseded by the two volume The Austrian Army in the Seven Years War in 2000 (ISBN 1883476194) and 2008.)
- Austerlitz 1805, Shoe String Press, 1977.
- Siege Warfare: The Fortress in the Early Modern World, 1494-1660, Routledge, 1979. (vol. 1)
- Siege Warfare: The Fortress in the Age of Vauban and Frederick the Great, 1660-1789, Routledge, 1985. (vol. 2)
- Frederick the Great: A Military Life, London 1985.
- Russia's Military Way to the West: Origins and Nature of Russian Military Power, 1700-1800, Routledge, 1985. ISBN 0710007973 OCLC 8069764
- The Military Experience in the Age of Reason, London 1987.
- Red Storm on the Reich: The Soviet March on Germany, 1945, London 1991. OCLC 23139998
- Army of Frederick the Great, 1974, ISBN 088254277X, Second Edition, Emperor's Press, 1996.
- Eagles over the Alps: Suvorov in Italy and Switzerland, 1799, Emperor's Press, 1999.
- Instrument of War: The Austrian Army in the Seven Years War, Emperor's Press, 2000.
- Prussia's Glory: Rossbach and Leuthen, Emperor's Press, 2003.
- Fire And Stone: The Science of Fortress Warfare 1660-1860, Booksales, 2006, ISBN 0785821090.
- Through German Eyes: The British and the Somme, 1916, London 2006. ISBN 9780753822029 OCLC 85690778
- The '45: Bonnie Prince Charlie and the Untold Story of the Jacobite Rising, Phoenix Press, 2007. ISBN 0304355259 OCLC 51316554
- By Force of Arms: The Austrian Army in the Seven Years War, Volume 2, Emperor's Press, 2008.
- The Best of Enemies: Germans against Jacobites, 1746, Bitter Books/Emperor's Press, 2013.
- Fight for a Throne: The Jacobite '45 Reconsidered, Helion and Company, 2015.
