= Jean François Cornu de La Poype =

French general (1758–1851)

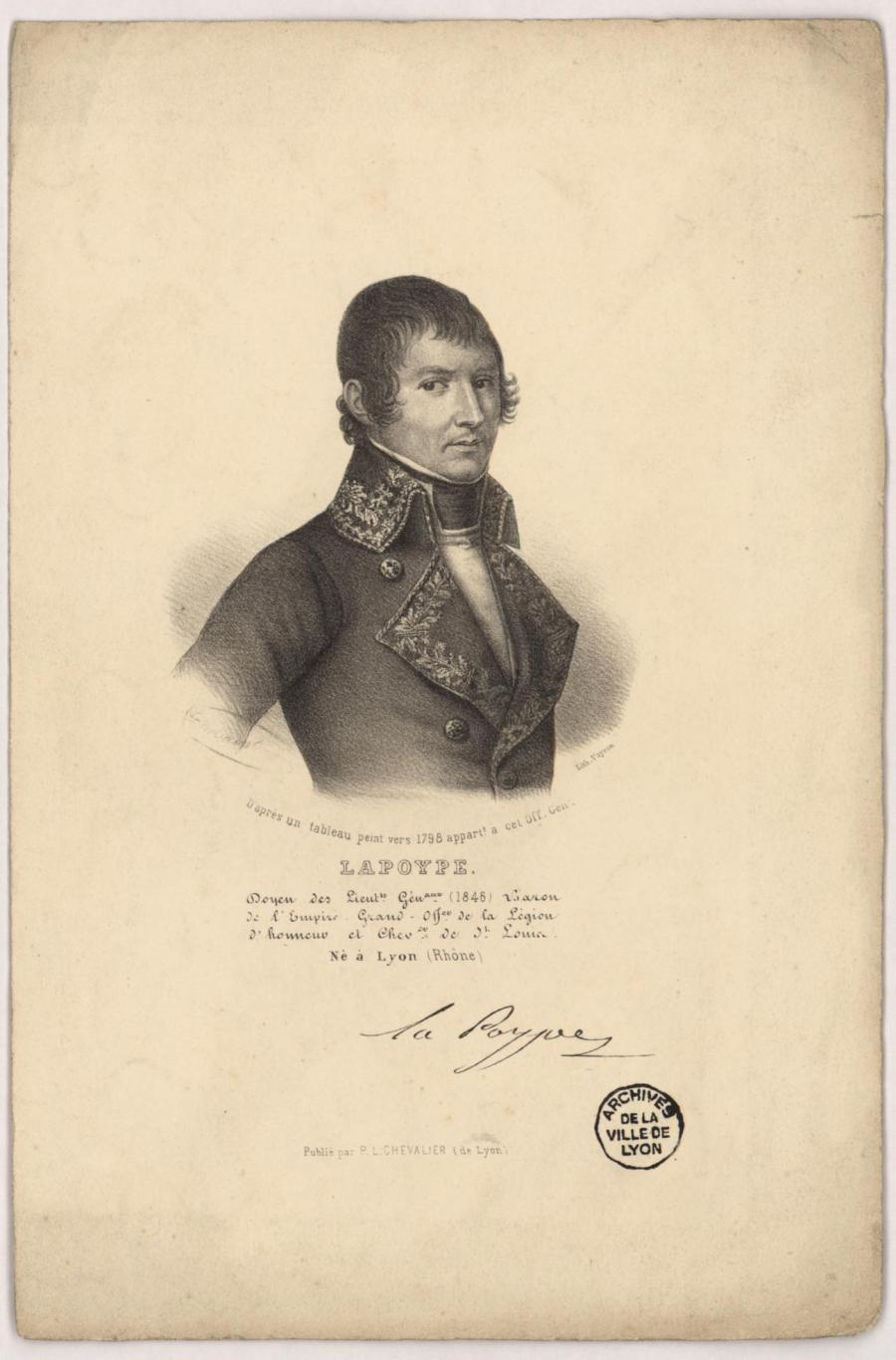
Jean François Cornu de La Poype, engraving

Jean François Cornu de La Poype (French pronunciation: [ʒɑ̃ fʁɑ̃swa kɔʁny də la pwap]; 31 May 1758 – 27 January 1851) was a French military leader. He was born in Lyon, to a noble, military family.

== French Revolutionary Wars ==
Under the ancien regime he joined the army at a young age and received the rank of brigadier before the French Revolution in 1789. He was named a divisional general on 15 May 1793. A Revolutionary partisan, he married the sister of famous convention member Louis-Marie Stanislas Fréron. He distinguished himself at Siege of Toulon. He contributed strongly to the retaking of the fortified town; he then directed the attack on Fort Pharon, then is charged by Committee of public safety to contain Marseille and the South of France under the regime of the Terror. Lapoype was not associated with the thermidor reaction, in which his brother-in-law was one of agitators. He remained without employment under the Directory and served in Italy after 18 brumaire.

== Consulate and Napoleonic wars ==
Sent to Santo Domingo in 1802, he deployed as much capacity there as of courage, made a treaty with Jean-Jacques Dessalines and embarked for France in 1803, and was captured en route by the English, who imprisoned him at Portsmouth. He was exchanged with another prisoner for British prisoners held by the French, and was unemployed until 1813. He was then named to command Wittenberg on the Elbe which Napoleon refortified. La Poype is distinguished in the conflict there in 1814 when it was stormed by the Prussian Army under General Bogislav Friedrich Emanuel von Tauentzien. La Poype fought with an elite unit, against forces ten times bigger and against a rebellion of the inhabitants. He took measures to escape the city rather than to yield. He left Wittenberg with weapons in hand, i.e. did not have to give them up after the suspension of hostilities. He was awarded the order of Saint-Louis and the command of Agen.

=== Hundred Days ===
In 1815, Napoleon named him commander of Lille. He forced the city to recognise the imperial revival, in spite of the exasperation of its inhabitants, who were strongly in favour of Bourbons. To respond to the threat of insurrection, he placed two cannons charged with grapeshot at the door of the house where he was staying; but it was the general headquarters he wanted to protect, and not his own person; and to prove it, he was seen walking without escort, with his hands behind his back, on the streets of Lille.

== Restoration ==
At the Bourbon Restoration, he was put into retirement. Named member of Chamber of Deputies in 1822, he voted consistently with the extreme left. In 1824, he was imprisoned for several months for writing a political booklet. He died at Brosses.
