= Konstantin Arsenyev =

Russian writer (1837–1919)

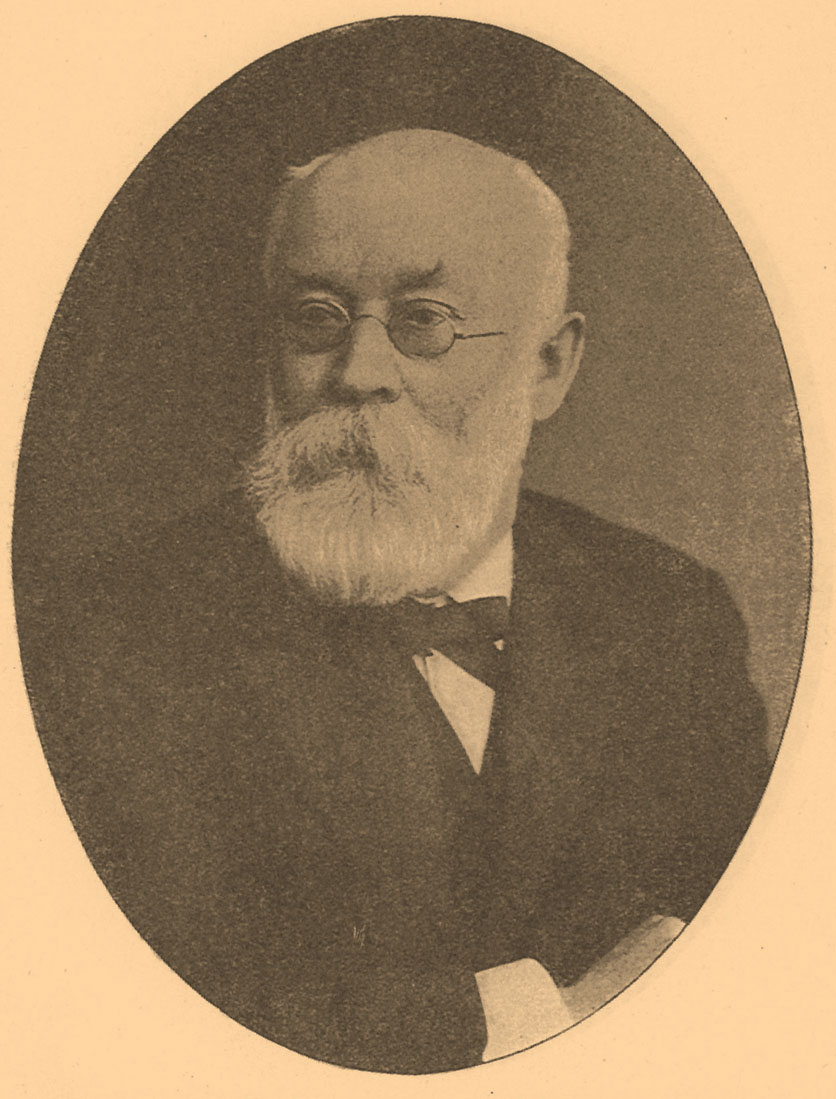
- Born: Константин Константинович Арсеньев; 5 February 1837; Saint Petersburg, Russian Empire
- Died: 22 March 1919 (aged 82); Petrograd, Soviet Russia
- Occupations: writer, journalist, essayist, lawyer, politician

Konstantin Konstantinovich Arsenyev (Russian: Константи́н Константи́нович Арсе́ньев, 5 February 1837, Saint Petersburg, Imperial Russia, — 22 March 1919, Petrograd, Soviet Russia) was a Russian journalist, essayist, lawyer, historian and, in his later years, a liberal politician.

Having started out in Russky Vestnik in 1858–1861 with a series of articles on history, in 1859—1860 Arsenyev moved on to become the deputy editor of the newly born Zhurnal Ministerstva Yustitsiyi (The Journal of the Ministry of Justice) before joining in 1862 Otechestvennye Zapiski where he became known for his series of essays on the British constitution and was for a while a Foreign Review department editor. After a two decades' career of a respectable lawyer (which resulted in, among other things, three critically lauded books on jurisprudence, published in 1870-1875) he retired and joined the staff of Severny Vestnik, the magazine to which he had been sporadically contributing since its inception in 1866. Numerous critical and analytical essays on, among others, Mikhail Saltykov-Shchedrin, Gleb Uspensky and Fyodor Dostoyevsky, composed his 1888 book Critical Etudes on Russian Literature (Критические этюды по русской литературе).

A long-standing member of the Russian Literary Fund chairmanship committee, in 1880s Arsenyev served several terms as its chairman. In 1891, with Fyodor Petrushevsky, he started editing the Brockhaus and Efron Encyclopedic Dictionary. Arsenyev was elected an honourable member of the Law Society at the Saint Petersburg University as well as of the Imperial Academy of Sciences (both in 1900) and the Free Economic Society (1903).

In his later life Arsenyev moved into politics to become one of the leaders of the liberal monarchist Party of Democratic Reform.

== Sources ==
- "Арсеньев, Константин Константинович" . Brockhaus and Efron Encyclopedic Dictionary (in Russian). 1906.
