= Kinburn =

Kinburn may refer to:

== Canada ==
- Kinburn, Huron County, Ontario, a community in Central Huron Township
- Kinburn, Carleton County, Ontario, a community in Ottawa

== Ukraine ==
- Kinburn Peninsula, a peninsula that separates Dnieper-Bug Estuary from Black Sea
  - Kinburn Spit, the western tip of Kinburn Peninsula
  - Kinburn Fortress, a historic fortress at the western tip of Kinburn Peninsula, facing Ochakiv
  - Battle of Kinburn (1787), Russo-Turkish War (1787–1792)
  - Battle of Kinburn (1855), Crimean War
- Kinburn Palanka, including Oleshky under the Crimean Khanate

== Other uses ==
- Russian battlecruiser Kinburn, four battlecruisers ordered by the Imperial Russian Navy before World War I

== See also ==
- Battle of Kinburn (disambiguation)
