= Siege of Izmail =

1790 battle of the Russo-Turkish War (1787–1792)

Storming of Izmail
- Part of the Russo-Turkish War (1787–1792)
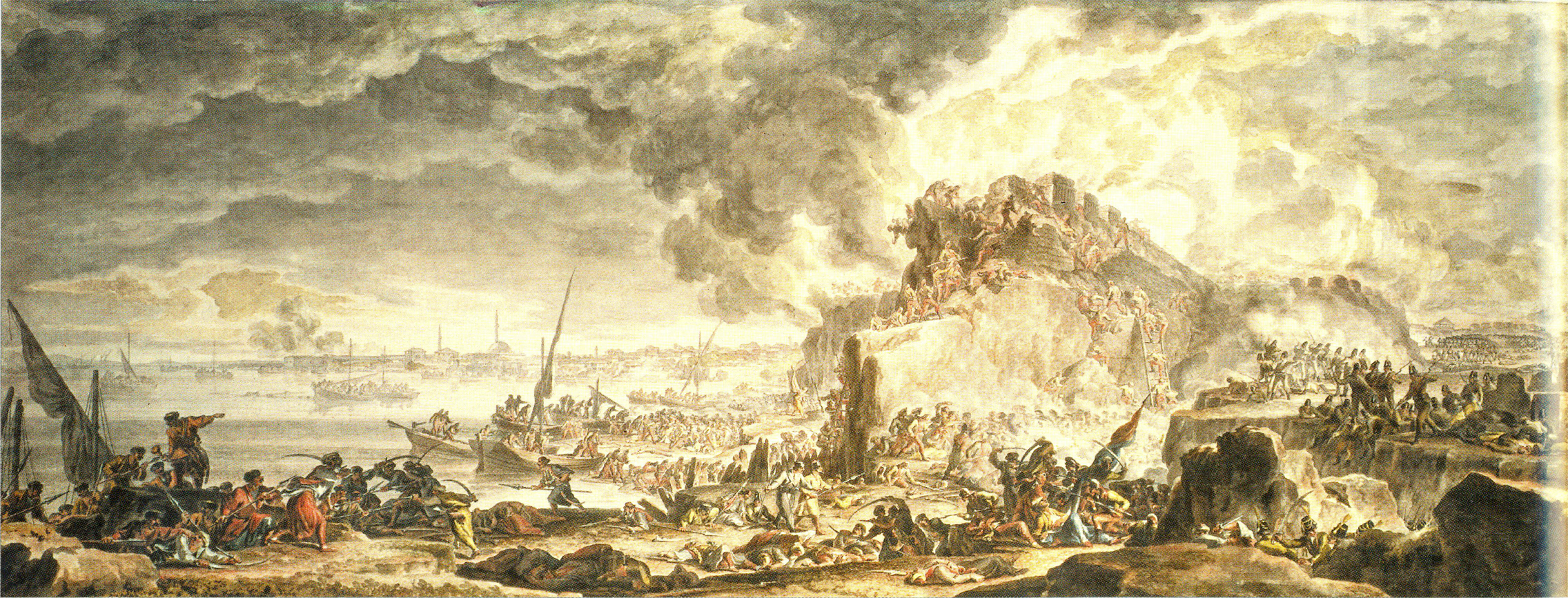
- The capture of Izmail by Russian troops under the command of General-in-Chief A. V. Suvorov on 11 December 1791, Mikhail Ivanov
Date	11 December 1790 (O.S.); 22 December 1790 (N.S.) (Note: Excluding bombardment on the 21st N.S. (10 December O.S.))
Location	Izmail Fortress, İzmail, Silistra Eyalet, Ottoman Empire
Result	Russian victory
Territorial changes	Treaty of Jassy

Belligerents
Russian Empire; Imperial Navy; Black Sea Cossack Host	Ottoman Empire: Crimeans (Note: 3–4,000 Crimean Tatars took part in the siege, but the Crimean Khanate practically no longer existed.)

Commanders and leaders
(Russian Empire) Alexander Suvorov; (Russian Empire) Alexander Samoylov (Note: Suvorov's left wing (12,000 men).); (Russian Empire) Mikhail Golenishchev-Kutuzov (Note: He was under Samoylov's command, leading one of the columns. The future commander-in-chief in the Russian Patriotic War of 1812. For courage at the storming he became fortress' commandant.); (Russian Empire) Pavel Potemkin (Note: Suvorov's right wing (7,500 men).); (Russian Empire) (Spain) José de Ribas (Note: Riverside (9,000 men). de Ribas was also under Suvorov disposal. There is a point of view that de Ribas drew up the plan for the capture of Izmail approved by Suvorov. This is specifically stated in the Russian Biographical Dictionary's entry on de Ribas. However, it is not confirmed by the modern Great Russian Encyclopedia, nor by professional historians, namely Bogdanovich, Orlov, Petrushevsky, Petrov (ru), Lopatin (ru) and Kipnis (ru), as well as Rostunov (ru) and Zolotaryov (ru), to whom the GRE refers. The GRE's article on de Ribas though only mentions his "participation in developing the plan". Also, the English literature on the topic does not mention this. In any case, Ribas got one of the most important parts of the assault's organization. While 6 columns supported by coastal artillery batteries were to attack the walls and gates from land, the flotilla was to land a landing force and attack from the less fortified riverside.)	Aydoslu Mehmed Pasha (POW); Pasha of Kiliia †; Mehmet Pasha †; Hafiz Pasha (POW); (Crimean Khanate) Qaplan Geray †; (Crimean Khanate) Maqsud Geray (POW) (Note: A descendant of Genghis Khan.)

Units involved
(Russian Empire) Southern Army (Note: Grigory Potemkin — commander-in-chief of the Southern Army. Alexander Suvorov — chief of the troops gathered at Izmail.) (Russian Empire) Black Sea Rowing Flotilla	

Strength
28,000–32,000 (Note: 28,000; 31,000; 32,000): • approx. 16,000 regulars; • approx. 15,000 irregulars and ill-equipped troops; 500 to 600 guns, including flotilla	40,000–42,000 (Note: 35,000 (not including Izmail's civilians under arms); 40,000; 42,000): • approx. 15,000 regulars (Note: An older estimate gives up to 17,000 janissaries (a regular force).); • approx. 20,000 militia; • approx. 7,000 armed citizenry of Izmail; 265 guns

Casualties and losses
4,582 to 10,000 killed & wounded (Note: 4,260 (1,800+ killed and 2,400+ wounded; data excluding officers; this is an official Russian report); 4,582 (the official report including officers; perhaps an incomplete number); 10,000 (4,000 killed and 6,000 wounded, including 400 officers out of 650))	up to 41,999 (Note: According to N. Orlov and M. Bogdanovich, only one person from the entire garrison was saved. As specifically Bogdanovich noted, this statement falls into the "as if" category; this same Ottoman person "managed to cross the Danube and convey the news of the defeat to the Grand Vizier" in Rusçuk (now Ruse, Bulgaria).): 23,000 to 26,000+ killed (Note: 23,000; 26,000; 26,000+); including 60 pashas; 5,000 wounded; 9,000 captured; all artillery pieces up to 400 standards

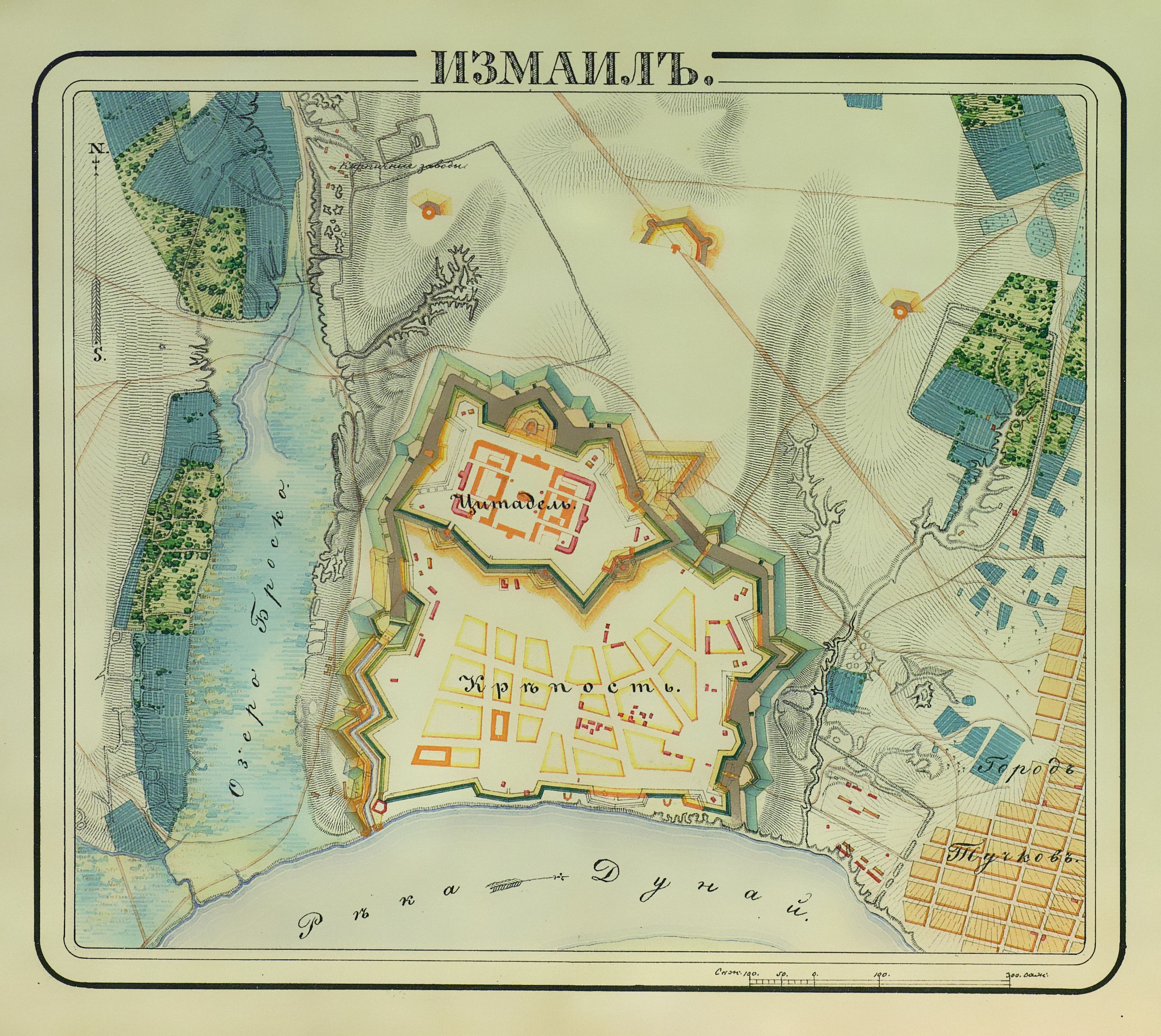
Izmail Fortress

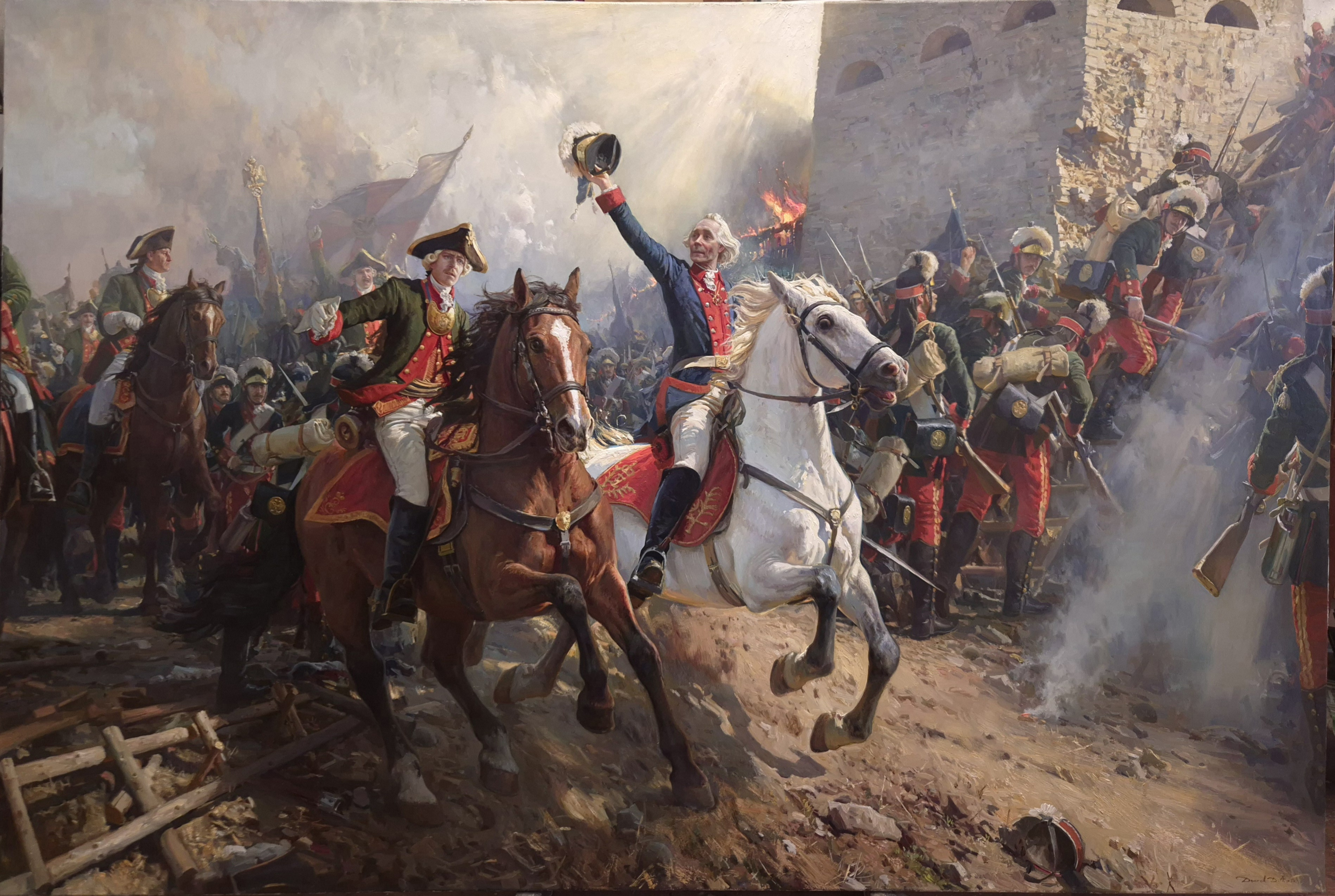
Suvorov on a white horse and the Russian soldiers storming Izmail. A commemorative painting from 2025 by artist Dmitry Dolgov; the painting is licensed under CC BY-SA 4.0. Academic precision and classical techniques of military art.

The siege of Izmail (Note: Also spelled Ismail, Ishmael, or İzmail.) (Turkish: İzmail Kuşatması), also called the storming of Izmail (Russian: Штурм Измаила), was a military action fought in 1790 on the Danube near the Black Sea during the Russo-Turkish War (1787–1792) and simultaneously the Austro-Turkish War (1788–1791). The Russians were led by Alexander Suvorov, who had defeated the Ottoman Turkish forces at Kinburn, Focsani, and Rymnik, as well as participating in the siege of Ochakov. The Black Sea rowing flotilla was commanded by the Spanish admiral José de Ribas (Iosif Deribas) who was in the service of the Russian Empire. In preparation for the storming, Suvorov personally trained his soldiers and, approaching Izmail Fortress at a distance of a gunshot, explained to senior officers how and where to act during the assault. It is regarded as one of Suvorov's finest victories and one of the greatest deeds in world military history.

The fortress was considered to be impregnable and was referred to as "a fortress without weak points", and was commanded by one of the best and most experienced Ottoman generals, Aydoslu Mehmed Pasha, who did not allow the Russian commanders Ivan Gudovich, Alexander Samoylov, Pavel Potemkin, and Deribas (November, 1790) to capture Izmail in the previous beleaguering. The Ottoman commander Hassan Pasha, after his defeat by Nikolai Repnin at Salcia, repelled Repnin's attempt to take Izmail in 1789; however, in this case, the blame lies largely with Repnin's own indecision.

== Background ==
Suvorov gave Commander-in-Chief Potemkin advice regarding subsequent military operations; "rowing fleet should seize the Danube Delta, take Tulcha and Isaktcha, together with ground troops to conquer Izmail and Brailov and put a tremor on Sistovo". Two detachments were intended for action on the Lower Danube; with the help of a rowing fleet they were to take possession of all local Turkish fortifications, destroy Ottoman river vessels and generally clear the Lower Danube with its coasts. Most of this task was accomplished without special effort; by the end of November, the small fortresses of Kilia, (Note: Gudovich took it.) Tulcea, and Isaktcha were in Russian hands, and the Ottoman rowing flotillas had been annihilated. There remained the formidable stronghold of Izmail, "the key to the Danube", built under the direction of German and French engineers, in the region of Budjak (now in Ukraine).

The siege of Izmail in December 1790 was undertaken due to order of the supreme commander of the Russian Southern Army, General-Feldmarshal Grigory Potyomkin, – commonly known as Potemkin, – appointing a new leader of the forces at Izmail. Neither Nikolay Repnin (1789), nor Ivan Gudovich, replaced by Samoylov, nor Pavel Potyomkin, nor Deribas (November, 1790) were able to meet the challenge, failing the siege either through lack of overall command, or sluggishness, or indecisiveness on the part of their troops or themselves; Grigory Potyomkin then assigned the task of supervising the troops assembled at Izmail to General-in-Chief Count Suvorov-Rymniksky, who was then watching Galatz and Brailov with his corps. During the entire last November siege, Deribas managed, however, to eliminate most of the Turkish small vessels (77 captured and 210 sunk). The news of Suvorov's appointment spread throughout the flotilla and the siege corps instantly. Every soldier understood what the denouement of the inaction would be, and one of the top officials in his private letter expressed himself: "as soon as Suvorov arrives, the fortress will be stormed".

=== Austrian actions ===
More recently in 1790, Coburg's Austrians took Orșova. Afterwards, they tried to besiege Giurgiu stronghold: at first things went well for the Austrians there, but the Ottomans, in Prince of Coburg's absence, made a very successful sortie that spoilt the whole affair. They drove the Austrians away, took their artillery, and inflicted a loss of 1,000 men. The Austrians were 6 times stronger than the garrison of Giurgiu, but despite this, they lost all their siege artillery and were forced to retreat from Giurgiu. Potemkin gloatingly described this affair to his sovereign, mentioning Coburg in every negative way, but Coburg had no part in this rout. The affair at Giurgiu was a mere private failure, which, at the end of the same month of June, General Clerfayt partly made up for by a victory over the Turks at the Battle of Calafat. But with these three deeds of the Austrians their active operations ended.

== Preparations ==
=== Trainings ===
Arriving at Izmail on 13 December, Suvorov immediately began preparations for an assault. His troops were positioned in a semicircle 2.1 kilometres (1.3 mi) from the fortress; their flanks rested on the river, where Deribas' flotilla and the detachment on Çatal Island^{[ru]} (5 battalions of infantry with 8 artillery batteries) started the blockade. Reconnaissance was underway for several days in a row, with the participation of both Suvorov himself and his superiors; ladders and fascines were being prepared at the same time; Suvorov went among the soldiers, egging them on, joking with them. He would point towards Izmail and say, "There is the fortress. Its walls are high, its ditches deep, but we must take it. Our Mother, the Empress, has ordered it, and we must obey her". Suvorov, who was accompanied by Ober-Quartermaster Lehn and many generals and staff officers (so that everyone could become more familiar with the approaches to the fortress), rode up to Izmail within gun range, indicating the points to which the columns should be directed, where to attack, and how to support each other. At first, the Turks fired at Suvorov's retinue, but later, [it seems] they no longer considered it worthy of attention. Suvorov carefully thought out and drew up plans to respond to a major sortie, based on his bitter experience at Ochakov. In order to inspire the Turks with the idea that the Russian meant to conduct a proper siege, on the night of 18 December, on both flanks were laid batteries, each with 10 guns: two — on the west side, 300 m. from the fortification, and two — on the east side, not more than 370 m. from the hedge. To train troops for making an assault, a large moat was dug in the distance and filleed ramparts in design like Izmail; secretly on the night of 19 and 20 December Suvorov personally showed the troops escalade techniques and taught them to act with a bayonet, with the Turks represented by the fascines. On 18 December, 2 o'clock in the afternoon, Suvorov sent a note to the commandant of Izmail:

To Serasker, elders and all your society: I arrived here with the troops. Twenty-four hours to think about surrender and twenty-four hours of liberty; my first shots mean that liberty is gone; the assault is death. This is what I leave you for consideration.

The next day came a reply from the serasker, who asked permission to send two men to the Grand Vizier for a command and offered to conclude an armistice for 10 days. By 20 December Suvorov replied that he could not agree to the serasker's request and gave a deadline until the morning of the 21st day. In the appointed time there was no reply and the fate of Izmail was decided.

"The Ottoman Turks estimated the Russian siege corps at 85,000 men, expecting an assault every night. Half the men remained awake and huddled in dugouts. The serasker circled the fortress two or three times a day, Tatar sultans and Janissary aghas inspected it at night, and patrols circulated from battalion to battalion. The common people were unwilling to defend themselves; women urged the pashas to surrender, but the latter wanted to fight back, and, in general, the military relied on their own strength." Such were the deserters' reports, not reassuring for Russian soldiers, but Suvorov ordered them made known to everyone, "from the highest commanders to the rank and file." This was his system, based on mutual trust between superiors and subordinates. The council of war, assembled by Suvorov on 20 December, unequivocally decided to assault.

=== Short bombardment ===
The Russians had only 40 field guns, but no siege guns at all. Field artillery had no more than one set of ammunition; there was an extreme shortage of food, which could not be replenished due to winter conditions and lack of time; there were many sick soldiers. On the whole the state of Russian affairs there seemed very disappointing; nevertheless the assault was militarily and politically necessary. Alexander Suvorov's aim was to squeeze the fortress with pincers from three sides. The Ottomans would greatly disperse their forces and would not be able to support each other in the event of a possible breakthrough of any of the sections. This applied not only to the Ottoman soldiers, but also to their guns, many of which would also go to defend against Deribas' flotilla, rather than against Suvorov's own assault columns.

One day before the assault (21 December), Suvorov ordered the bombardment of Izmail (with naval and ground cannons). The only unprotected section of this fortress was on the Danube side, which was supposed to be defended by ships. Yet the Ottoman fleet had already been defeated by the Russian one during the Battle of Tendra by the great Russia's admiral of those times — Fyodor Ushakov.

An artillery duel took place. At sunrise the assault preparation was begun by fire from the flank batteries, Çatal, and flotilla ships; cannons were smashing Izmail until late at night; the Turkish artillery answered, but soon the firing from the fortress became weaker and finally stopped. Thanks to the fleet, the Russians had an advantage in guns. The firefight started unsuccessfully for the Russians, when a lucky Ottoman cannonball hit the powder chamber of the frigate Konstantin, after which it blew up, but this did not help the Ottomans win the duel either. The bombardment continued until 3:00 am, but since there were no siege guns on land, the walls could not be breached.

== The assault and its planning ==
=== Disposition ===
==== Numbers ====
On the early dusky morning of 22 December 1790, the Russians hoped to take their enemy by surprise, however, information about Suvorov's plans of assault was leaked to the Turkish camp, but Turks were unable to pinpoint the exact location of main Russian attack. The Russians began the assault on Izmail, which had a garrison of 35,000 soldiers (or 40,000), of which around 15,000 regular troops and ~20,000 militias, under the leadership of Aydoslu Mehmed Pasha, a firm, resolute, and battle-tested commander. Suvorov had 31,000 troops, of which 15,000 were irregular and poorly armed.

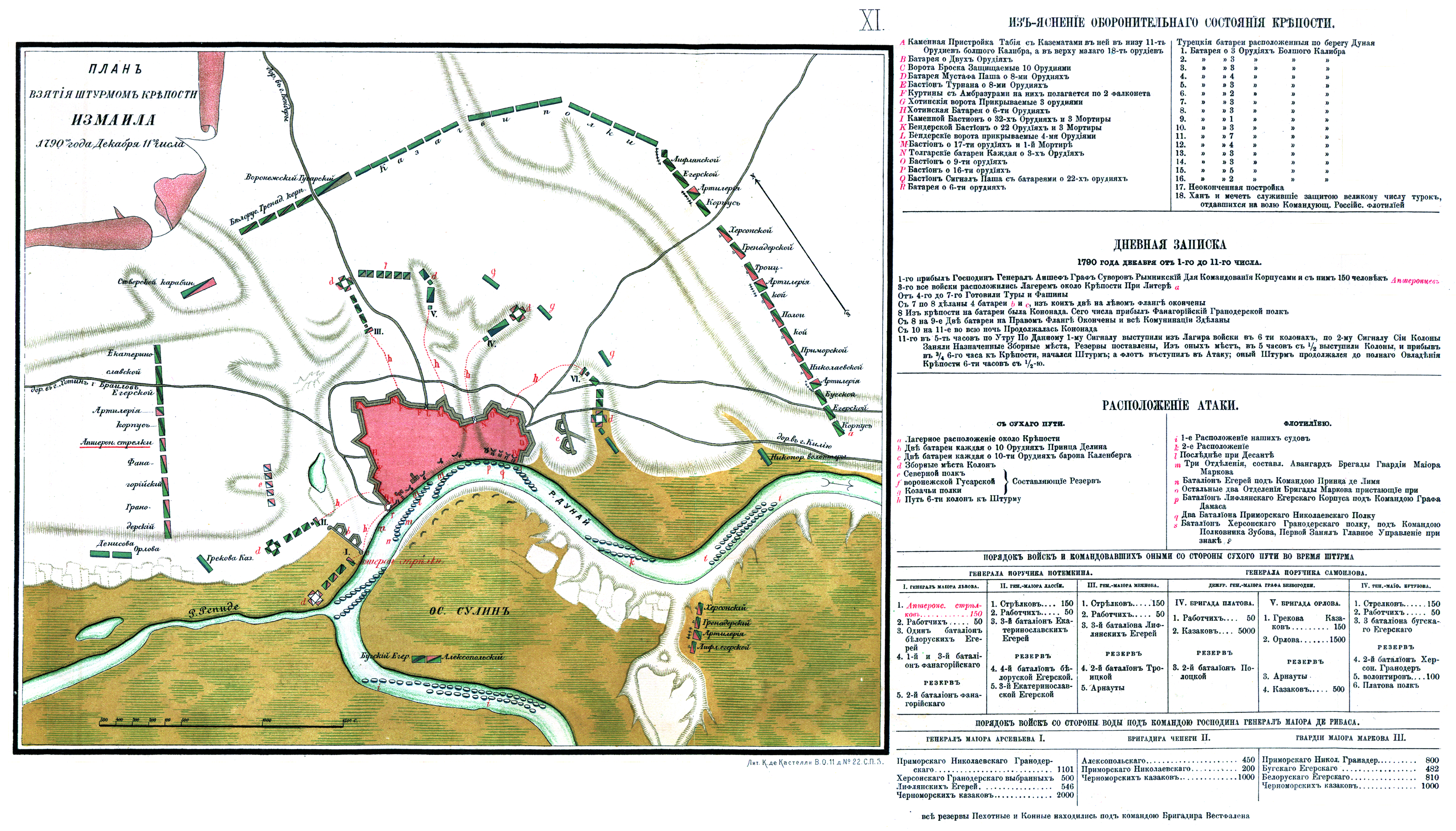
Izmail order of battle

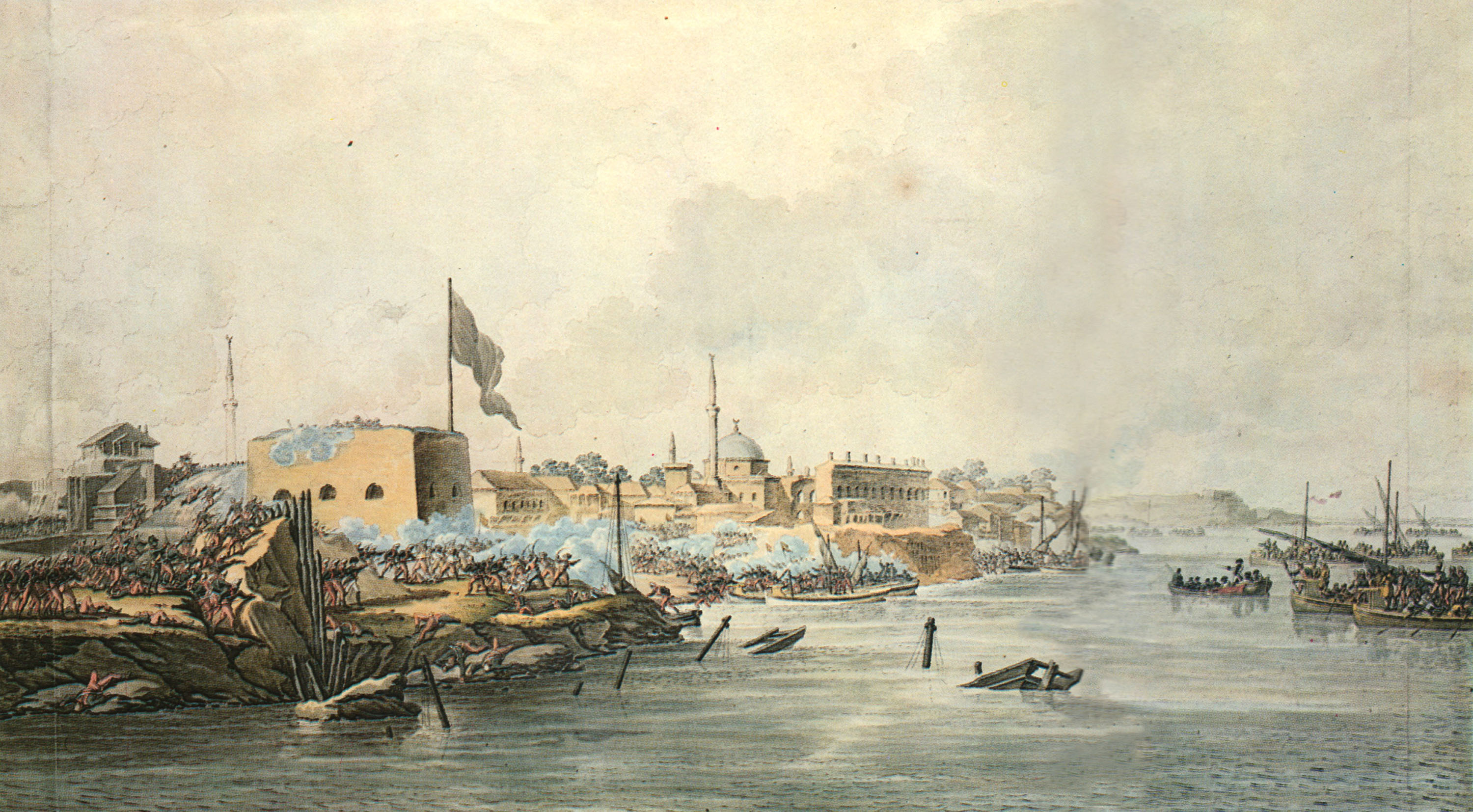
The engraving of Samuil Schiflar (painted version). Creation of the engraving was inspired by a watercolor painting of military artist Ivanov. Ivanov's painting was based on the sketches, made by the artist during the battle.

==== Plan of attack ====
Suvorov's troops consisted of: the right wing, commanded by Pavel Potyomkin, formed out of the columns of Lvov, Lacy, and Meknob; the left wing, commanded by Alexander Samoylov, formed out of the columns of Orlov, Platov, and Golenishchev-Kutuzov (Kutuzov); the fleet — Iosif Deribas — his landing columns under the command of Arsenyev, Chepiha, and Markov. The detachment of Deribas (9,000) was to attack from the river side, with the right column of Major General Arsenyev (3 battalions and 2,000 Cossacks) was given the task to attack the New Fortress, the middle column of Brigadier Chepiha (3 battalions and 1,000 Cossacks) — the center of the coastal front, the left column of Major General Markov (5 battalions and 1,000 Cossacks) — the Old Fortress. The flotilla was ordered to approach Izmail, being built in two lines: the 1st — 145 light ships and Cossack boats with landing troops, the 2nd — 58 large ships, which by fire of heavy guns were to cover the landing. The detachment of Lieutenant General Potyomkin (7,500) was to lead the assault against the fortress' western side with the right column of Major General Lvov to seize the redoubt of Tabia and then spread to the left; the middle column of Major General Lacy to seize the curtain wall at the Bros gate and spread to the left all the way to the Khota gate; the left column of Major General Meknob was to seize the curtain wall at the Khota gate and spread to the left. Each column consisted of 5 battalions; 150 jaegers were to go at the head, followed by 50 workers with tools, then 3 battalions with fascines and ladders, and a reserve of 2 battalions at the tail. The detachment of Lieutenant General Samoylov (12,000) was to go against the eastern front, with the leading column of Brigadier Orlov (2,000 Cossacks) was to seize the rampart east of the Bender gate and spread to the left to support the middle column of Brigadier Platov (5,000 Cossacks), which was to climb the rampart through the valley that divided the Old and New Fortress, and then contribute to the Deribas troops; 150 selected Cossacks with rifles were to march in front of each column, followed by 50 workers, and then the remaining Cossacks on foot; two battalions of infantry were to serve as a reserve for both columns, given under the command of Major General Bezborodko; left column of Major General Golenishchev-Kutuzov (5 battalions and 1,000 Cossacks) was to seize the rampart at Cilic gate, then spread to the right and left. Westphalen's cavalry (2,500) was assigned to the reserve; 10 squadrons were divided into 3 detachments, which stood against the Bros, Khota and Bender gates; 4 Cossack regiments were positioned further to the east and 1 squadron was left at wagon fort.

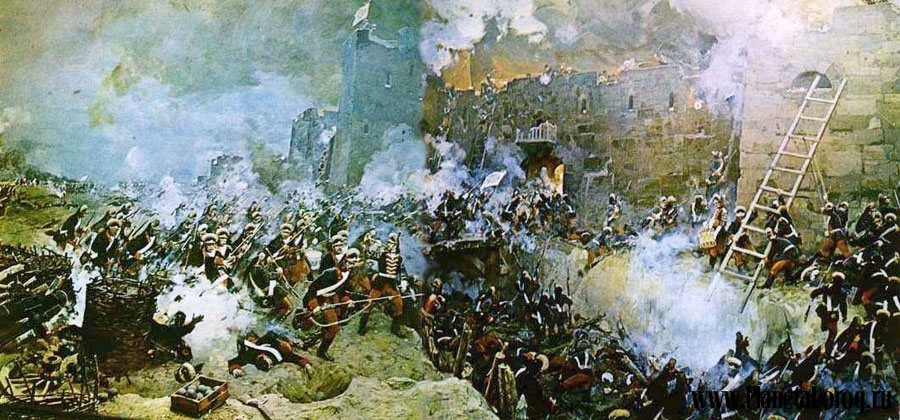
Another engraving by Samuil Schiflar

=== Storming ===
==== To the walls ====
At 3 a.m. on the 22nd the first signal flare went up, by which the troops moved to the positions; at 5:30 a.m. by the third flare the troops moved to the assault. Turks opened fire with cannons. Lacy's column was the first to climb the rampart. Lvov's column failed to take Tabia redoubt, despite the heroism of Suvorov's Phanagorian grenadiers and Apsheron riflemen, who "fought like lions", repelling a raid, and took possession of the first batteries, but no more; Lacy was wounded and Colonel Zolotukhin took command, managing to take Bros and Khota gates and join Lacy's column. Meknob's column had the hardest time, attacking the large bastion in the northwestern corner of the fortress, the one next to it to the east, and the curtain wall between them (instead of the curtain wall assigned to it by the disposition); here the rampart had a small height, and the serasker himself defended this section with elite Janissaries; but, despite the enormous losses, the troops of the column, under Colonel Khvostov, who replaced the wounded Meknob, brilliantly accomplished the task. While there during the battle, Suvorov contributed to this: having received a report that all the battalion commanders of the Livonian Jaeger Corps^{[ru]}, which formed the column's main part, were wounded, assigned Lieutenant Colonel Fries of the Voronezh Hussar Regiment to command the entire corps. The Turks made a desperate sortie from the Bender gate against Brigadier Orlov's column, as it began to climb the rampart. Thanks to the timely arrival of Suvorov's reinforcements (1 battalion of infantry, 7 squadrons and 1 regiment of Cossacks), the sortie was repulsed, but Orlov managed to capture the wall only with the help of Platov's troops. Platov, advancing along the ravine, met an obstacle — a curtain wall, which, crossing the stream flowing through the ravine, formed a dam, waist-deep; Cossacks crossed in the ford and, with the help of infantry battalion sent to their aid, seized the curtain wall; after that part of Platov's troops moved to support Orlov's column, while another part got in contact with Arsenyev's column. Golenishchev-Kutuzov's column after a fierce battle seized the Cilic gate. When one of Kutuzov's attacks on the gate failed, despite his personal participation in the heat of battle, Suvorov encouraged Kutuzov, declaring that the latter had already been appointed commandant of the "anticipatorily captured fortress". Deribas' detachment about 7 am, despite the resistance of 10,000 Turks and Crimean Tatars, successfully made the landing and seized the points assigned to him by disposition.

==== Inside the stronghold ====
By 8 a.m. the Russian troops firmly established themselves on the ramparts of Izmail; the Bros, Khota, and Bender gates were opened, and the cavalry reserves entered the fortress. Suvorov, however, forbade the cavalry to enter inside the city until the infantry cleared the way for it with bayonets. The first to step on the fortress walls was Major Nekludov; and after a short rest, the assault columns from different sides moved toward the center of the city. A new fierce fighting began; the Turks resisted stubbornly; every building, every scrap of land in the fortress had to be taken with the fight. Suvorov, wanting to quickly gain a foothold in the city, ordered 20 light cannon to be brought into the fortress and to open fire along the city streets. The Russians made their way into the Old and the New Fortresses, as well as the Citadel. Garrisoned Crimean Tatars and some Turks, commanded by Qaplan Geray (cousin of the last Crimean Khan and victor against the Austrians at Giurgiu in 1789), then made a desperate attempt to recapture Izmail with 3,000–4,000 men in the Old Fortress. They overturned the Black Sea Cossacks, taking away two of their guns, but the regular infantry stopped this onslaught. Five of Qaplan's sons were killed with Qaplan Geray himself, while Maqsud Geray, descendant of Genghis Khan himself, was captured. By about 4 o'clock in the afternoon the battle subsided; Izmail was taken by the Russians.

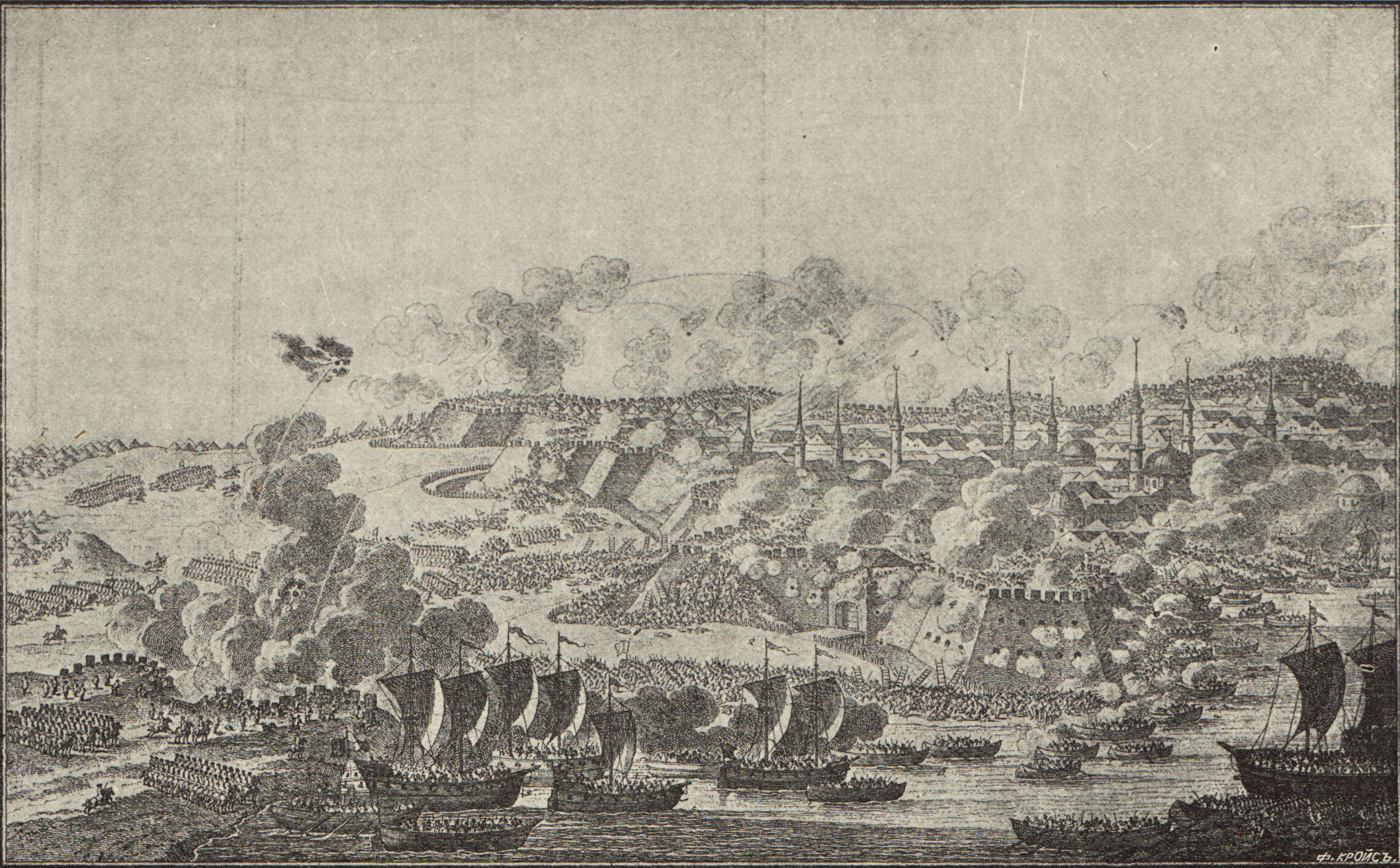
From The storming of Izmail by Suvorov in 1790, written by Nikolay A. Orlov. V. A. Berezovsky Warehouse of the Publication C. Schulz del. et Sculp. 1790

== Result ==
Many ships, munitions and various riches (gold, silver, pearls and precious stones) went to the victors. Several thousand women, children, Jews, Armenians and Moldavians settled in the city after the storming. Of the entire garrison only one man escaped. In total, the Ottoman forces had more than 26,000 casualties with the almost whole armed force of the stronghold being killed. 5,000 were wounded and 9,000 captured. Those who were wounded were captured. The siege hardships and the stubborn Ottoman resistance irritated their victor to the last degree: they gave no mercy to anyone; everyone died under the blows of the furious soldiers, — both the stubbornly defensive and the weaponless, even women and children. Even the officers could not keep people from aimless bloodshed and blind rage. According to the promise given in advance by Suvorov, the city was given to the soldiers for 3 days, — this was the custom of that time; therefore, on the next and on the third day, more cases of violence and murder continued, and on the first night, the crackle of rifle and pistol shots rang out until the morning. The robbery took on terrible proportions. Soldiers broke into houses and seized all kinds of property, — rich clothes, precious weapons, jewelry; merchants' shops were smashed, and over their owners' corpses the new masters sought the spoils; many houses stood dilapidated, their inhabitants lay in blood, screams for help, cries of despair, the wheezing of the dying were heard everywhere; the conquered city presented a terrifying sight. As per the official estimate, Russian forces suffered only 4,330 casualties, out of which 1,815 were killed; according to another estimate, Russia suffered 4,000 killed and 6,000 wounded. The participants of the Ochakov storming considered it a "toy" compared to the Izmail assault, and Suvorov himself later said that

"such an extraordinary storm could be dared only once in a lifetime."

Immediately after the complete conquest of the fortress, Suvorov ordered measures to ensure order. Mikhail Golenishchev-Kutuzov was appointed commandant of the fortress for his courage in battle, guards were placed in the most important places, patrols were sent in different directions of the city. "Why did Your Excellency congratulate me on my appointment to this position when success was still in doubt?" Kutuzov asked Suvorov. "Suvorov knows Kutuzov, and Kutuzov knows Suvorov," replied Count Rymniksky. "If Izmail had not been captured, we both would have died beneath its walls." Catherine II awarded Suvorov the rank of lieutenant colonel of the Preobrazhensky Life Guards Regiment, where she herself was a colonel. The dead were being cleaned up, and help was being given to the wounded. A huge hospital was opened inside the city because the number of wounded was huge. The bodies of the murdered Russians were taken out of this city and buried according to the church rite. There were so many Turkish corpses that there was no way to bury all the dead, and yet their decomposition could lead to the spread of infection; therefore, it was ordered to throw the bodies into the Danube and prisoners were used for this work, divided into turns. But even with this method, it was only after 6 days that Izmail was cleared of corpses.

The conquest of Izmail was of great political importance, as it influenced the further course of the war and the conclusion of peace in 1791.

The impression made by the storming of Izmail on Turkey and Europe was numbing. The Sistova conferences were interrupted (representatives of the European powers negotiated with the Ottoman Empire); the Turks began to flee from Maçin and Babadag; in Bucharest they simply did not believe what had happened, and in Brailov, despite the 12-thousand garrison, "the inhabitants asked the pasha to surrender when the Russian (troops) approached the fortress, so that they would not suffer the same fate as Izmail". In Constantinople the Ottomans remembered the legend that a blond people would come from the north and drive them into Asia. Therefore, fear and despondency prevailed in the Turkish capital, every minute expected outrage; it was strictly forbidden to talk about the actions of the Russians; when the rumor of the capture of Izmail did spread, the excitement of the people reached extreme proportions. The Ottomans spoke of the necessity of strengthening the capital, of a general militia, but the summoning of troops was not successful. Thus, decline in hostilities began.

The storming of Izmail marked an important stage in the development of military art. The advantages of an open assault on fortresses as compared to the then prevailing methods of conquering them by means of a long siege were revealed. The preparation of the assault is instructive by training troops in conditions close to the combat situation. Artillery was effectively used in the assault, the interaction of land forces with the flotilla and between the assaulting detachments and columns was well established, it was also an example of skilful street fighting. With the capture of Izmail the Russian army completed the campaign of 1790.

Award Cross "For the Capture of Izmail" was established in 1791.

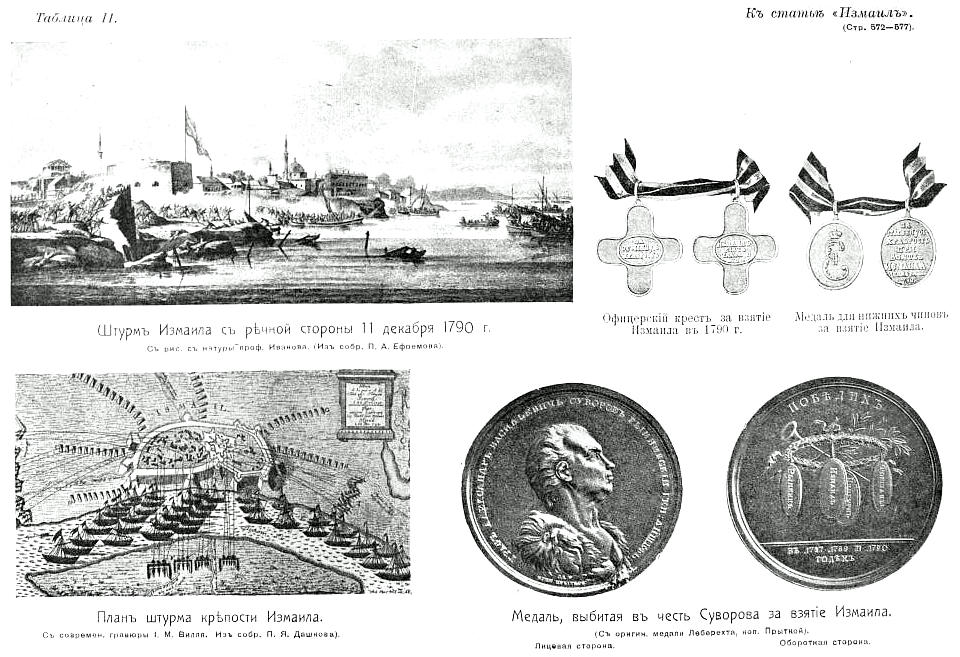
Left to right from the top: The storming of Izmail from the river side on 22 December [O.S. 11 December] 1790; Officer's Cross for the capture of Izmail; Medal for lower ranks for the capture of Izmail; The plan for the storming; Medal struck in honour of Suvorov for his capture of Izmail; Illustrations for the article "Izmail". Military Encyclopedia (Saint Petersburg, 1911–1915)

== Legacy ==
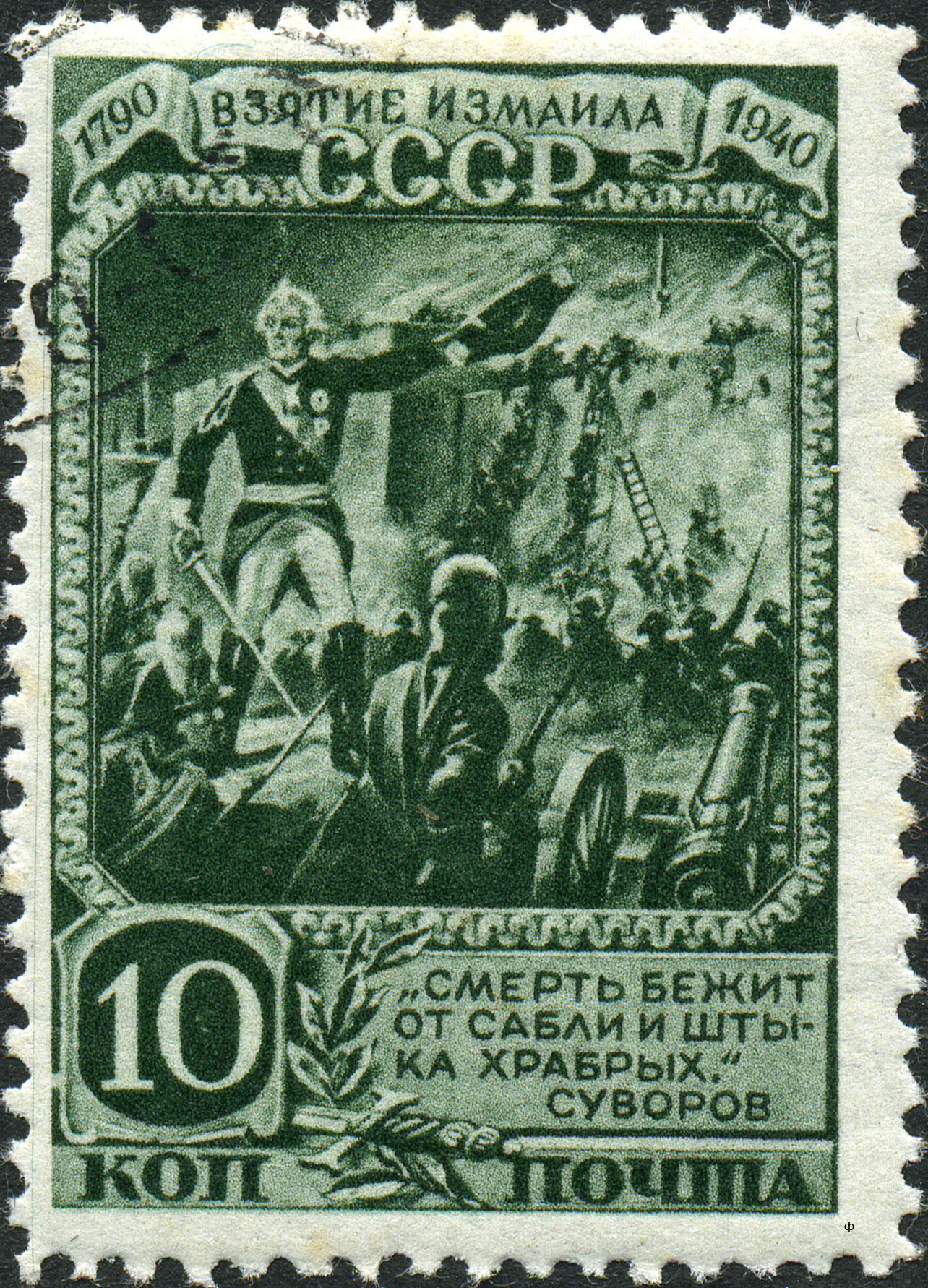
Capture of Izmail. USSR stamp. 10 kopecks. "Death flees the saber and bayonet of the brave." (Alexander Suvorov).

To the victory was dedicated the anthem Grom pobedy, razdavaysya! ("Let the Thunder of Victory Rumble!") which was an unofficial Russian national anthem in the late 18th and early 19th centuries. Today it is commemorated as a Day of Military Honour in Russia. Along with the battles of Rymnik, Praga, and Trebbia, the Storming of Izmail is one of Suvorov's military achievements. Suvorov, as A. F. Petrushevsky claimed, is a "great master" who beat the Ottomans to an unprecedented degree of perfection.

The siege is dramatized in cantos 7 and 8 of Lord Byron's verse-novel Don Juan (1823). His principal source, he states in the preface, was Gabriel de Castelnau's account of the siege in Essai sur l'histoire ancienne et moderne de la Nouvelle Russie (1820).

The monument to Alexander Suvorov in Izmail's city centre was placed in temporary storage on 12 November 2022, until city deputies decide where it will be kept permanently.

== Sources ==
- Grant, R. G. (2017). 1001 Battles That Changed the Course of History. Chartwell Books. ISBN 978-0-7858-3553-0.
- Longworth, Philip (1966). The Art of Victory: The Life and Achievements of Field-Marshal Suvorov, 1729–1800. New York: Holt, Rinehart and Winston. pp. 165–174.
- Duffy C. Russia's Military Way to the West: Origins and Nature of Russian Military Power 1700–1800. Routledge & Kegan Paul Books Ltd. 1985.
- Osipov, K. (1939). Alexander Suvorov. Hutchinson & Co. (Publishers) Ltd..
- Byron, George Gordon (1905). The Complete Poetical Works (Cambridge ed.). Boston: Houghton Mifflin.
- J. Goodwin, Lords of the Horizons, 1998, Henry Holt and Company, ISBN 0805063420.
- Anthing, Johann Friedrich (1813). History of the Campaigns of Count Alexander Suworow-Rymnikski. London: W. Green and T. Chaplin.
- Witzleben, A. von (1859). Prinz Friedrich Josias von Coburg-Saalfeld, Herzog zu Sachsen. Vol. 1. Berlin: Königliche Geheime Ober-Hofbuchdruckerei.
- Bodart, Gaston (1908). Militär-historisches Kriegs-Lexikon (1618–1905) (in German). Vienna and Leipzig: C. W. Stern.
- Orlov, Nikolay Aleksandrovich (1890). Штурм Измаила Суворовым в 1790 году [The storming of Izmail by Suvorov in 1790] (in Russian). St. Petersburg: Типография Тренке и Фюсно. OCLC 781494287.
- Bogdanovich, Modest Ivanovich (1852). Походы Румянцева, Потемкина и Суворова в Турции. Saint Petersburg: Типография Эдуарда Веймара.
- Skritsky, N. V. (2002). "Основатель Одессы. О. М. де Рибас" [Founder of Odessa. O. M. de Ribas]. Георгиевские кавалеры под Андреевском флагом [St. George's Cavaliers under St. Andrew's flag]. Россия забытая и неизвестная. Moscow: Centrepolygraph. ISBN 5-9524-0053-1.
- Kipnis, Boris Grigoryevich (2021). Непобедимый. Жизнь и сражения Александра Суворова [Invincible. Life and battles of Aleksandr Suvorov] (electronic ed.). St. Petersburg: Издательский дом "Питер". ISBN 9785446112845.
- Lopatin, Vyacheslav Sergeyevich (2015). Суворов (electronic ed.). Molodaya Gvardiya. ISBN 978-5-235-03829-5.
- Arsenyev, Konstantin; Petrushevsky, Fyodor (1894). Brockhaus and Efron Encyclopedic Dictionary (in Russian). Vol. XIIа: "Земпер — Имидокислоты". Friedrich A. Brockhaus (Leipzig), Ilya A. Efron (St. Petersburg).
- Velichko, Konstantin; Novitsky, Vasily; Schwarz, Alexey; Apushkin, Vladimir; Schulz, Gustav (1912). Sytin Military Encyclopedia (in Russian). Vol. X: "Елисавета Петровна – Инициатива". Moscow: Типография Т-ва И. Д. Сытина.
- Kolganov, A. M. (2016). "ИЗМАИЛА ШТУРМ 1790". Great Russian Encyclopedia. Electronic version. Archived from the original on 23 January 2023.
