= Russo-Turkish War (1787–1792) =

Seventh conflict of the Russo-Turkish wars

- Part of the series of Russo-Turkish wars
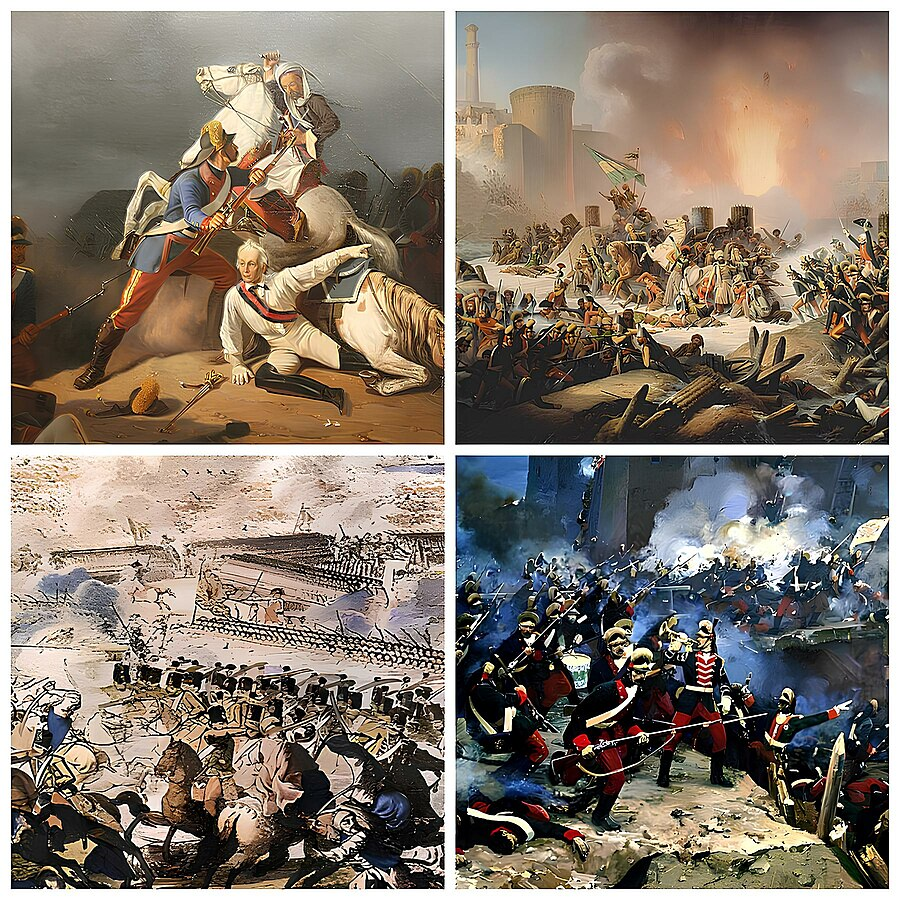
- Clockwise, from top left: The Battle of Kinburn, The Siege of Ochakov, The Siege of Izmail, The Battle of Rymnik
Date	19 August 1787 – 9 January 1792
Location	Eastern Europe, Caucasus, Mediterranean
Result	Russian victory
Territorial changes	Russian annexation of Ottoman Sanjak of Özi (Yedisan or Ochacov Oblast); Black Sea Cossack Host resettled to Kuban

Belligerents
Russian Empire; (Russian Empire) Albanian Battalion; Black Sea Cossacks; Montenegro (Holy Roman Empire) Habsburg monarchy: (Holy Roman Empire) Serbian Free Corps; Banatian Sich	Ottoman Empire; Danubian Sich; Budjak Horde; Nekrasov Cossacks; Deylik of Algiers; Pashalik of Scutari; French volunteers; Caucasian Imamate; Circassia (1787–1791)

Commanders and leaders
(Russian Empire) Catherine II (Russian Empire) Grigory Potemkin # (Note: Died of illness during peace negotiations at Iaşi, Ottoman Empire on 16 October 1791) (Russian Empire) Pavel Potemkin (Russian Empire) Alexander Suvorov (Russian Empire) Ivan Saltykov (Russian Empire) Pyotr Rumyantsev (Russian Empire) Mikhail Kamensky (Russian Empire) Nicholas Repnin (Russian Empire) Mikhail Kutuzov (Russian Empire) Marko Voinovich (Russian Empire) Ivan Gudovich (Russian Empire) Fyodor Ushakov (Russian Empire) Nikolay Mordvinov (Russian Empire) (Spain) José de Ribas (Russian Empire) (United States) John Paul Jones; Koča Anđelković (executed); Sydir Bily †	(Ottoman Empire) Abdülhamid I (1787–1789) (Ottoman Empire) Selim III (1789–1792) (Ottoman Empire) Yusuf Pasha (Ottoman Empire) Hasan Pasha # (Note: Died of either natural causes or poisoning at Şumnu, Ottoman Empire on 19 March 1790) (Ottoman Empire) Aydoslu Pasha (Ottoman Empire) Cenaze Pasha (Ottoman Empire) Süleyman Bey; Kara Mahmud Pasha; Sheikh Mansur

Strength
(Russian Empire) 350,000; 250,000–300,000; Unknown	(Ottoman Empire) 200,000; Unknown

Casualties and losses
(Russian Empire) 59,000–72,000 killed 50,000 killed (1788–1789); Unknown	(Ottoman Empire) Between 116,000–130,000 and 200,000 killed

The Russo-Turkish War of 1787–1792 involved an unsuccessful attempt by the Ottoman Empire to regain lands lost to the Russian Empire in the course of the previous Russo-Turkish War (1768–1774). It took place concomitantly with the Austro-Turkish War (1788–1791), the Russo-Swedish War (1788–1790), and the Theatre War.

During the Russian-Turkish War of 1787–1792, on 25 September 1789, a detachment of the Imperial Russian Army under Alexander Suvorov and Ivan Gudovich took Khadjibey and Yeni Dünya for the Russian Empire. In 1794, Odesa replaced Khadjibey by a decree of the Russian Empress Catherine the Great.

Russia formally gained possession of the Sanjak of Özi (Ochakiv Oblast) in 1792 and it became a part of Yekaterinoslav Viceroyalty. The Russian Empire retained full control of Crimea, as well as the land between the Southern Bug and the Dniester.

== Background ==
In May and June 1787, Catherine II of Russia made a triumphal procession through Novorossiya and the annexed Crimea in company of her ally, Joseph II, Holy Roman Emperor. These events, the rumors about Catherine's Greek Plan, and the friction caused by the mutual complaints of infringements of the Treaty of Küçük Kaynarca, which had ended the previous Russian-Turkish war, stirred up public opinion in the Ottoman capital Constantinople, while the British and French ambassadors lent their unconditional support to the Ottoman war party.

== War ==
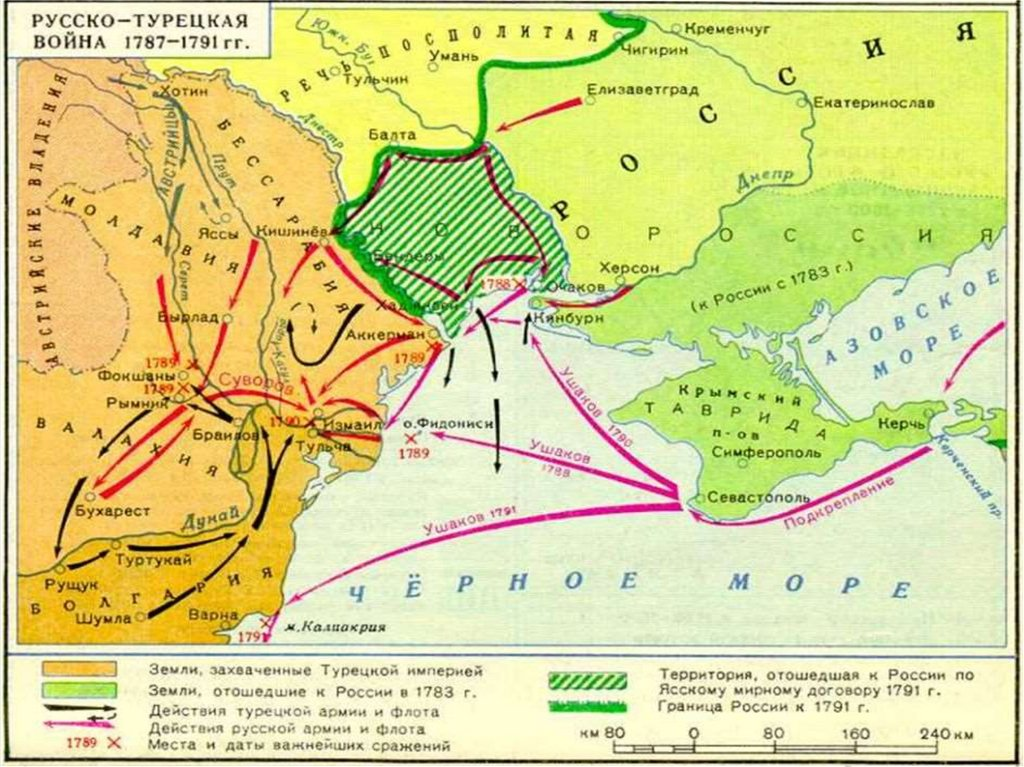
Course of the war (in Russian).

In 1787, the Ottomans demanded that the Russians evacuate the Crimea and give up their holdings near the Black Sea, which Russia saw as a casus belli. Russia declared war on 19 August 1787, and the Ottomans imprisoned the Russian ambassador, Yakov Bulgakov. Ottoman preparations were inadequate and the moment was ill-chosen, as Russia and Austria were now in alliance. The Ottomans mustered forces throughout their domain, and Süleyman Bey from Anatolia went himself to the front at the head of 4,000 soldiers.

The Ottoman Empire opened their offensive with an attack on two fortresses near Kinburn, in southern Ukraine. Russian General Alexander Suvorov held off these two Ottoman sea-borne attacks in September and October 1787, thus securing the Crimea. In Moldavia, Russian troops captured the cities of Chocim and Jassy. Ochakov, at the mouth of the Dnieper, fell on 6 December 1788 after a six-month siege by Prince Grigory Potemkin and Suvorov. All civilians in the captured cities were massacred by order of Potemkin.

Although suffering a series of defeats against the Russians, the Ottoman Empire found some success against the Austrians, led by Emperor Joseph II, in Serbia and Transylvania.

By 1789, the Ottoman Empire was being pressed back in Moldavia by Russian and Austrian forces. To make matters worse, on 1 August the Russians under Suvorov attained a victory against the Ottomans led by Osman Pasha at Focsani, followed by a Russian victory at Rymnik (or Rimnik) on 22 September, and drove them away from near the Râmnicul Sărat river. Suvorov was given the title Count Rymniksky following the battle. The Ottomans suffered more losses when the Austrians, under General Ernst Gideon von Laudon repelled an Ottoman invasion of Croatia, while an Austrian counterattack took Belgrade.

A Greek revolt, which further drained the Ottoman war effort, brought about a truce between the Ottoman Empire and Austria. Meanwhile, the Russians continued their advance when Suvorov captured the reportedly "impenetrable" Ottoman fortress of Izmail at the entrance of the Danube, in December 1790; this became possible also due to Fyodor Ushakov's victory at Tendra. A final Ottoman defeat at Machin (9 July 1791), coupled with Russian concerns about Prussia entering the war, led to a truce agreed upon on 31 July 1791. After the capture of the fortress, Suvorov marched upon Constantinople (present-day Istanbul), where the Russians hoped they could establish a Christian empire. However, the slaughters that were committed in the ensuing period somewhat defiled Suvorov's reputation in many eyes, and there were allegations at the time that he was drunk at the Siege of Ochakov. Persistent rumors about his actions were spread and circulated, and in 1791 he was relocated to Finland.

== Aftermath ==
Accordingly, the Treaty of Jassy was signed on 9 January 1792, recognizing Russia's 1783 annexation of the Crimean Khanate. Yedisan (Odessa and Ochakov) was also ceded to Russia, and the Dniester was made the Russian frontier in Europe, while the Russian Asiatic frontier—the Kuban River—remained unchanged. The Ottoman war goal to reclaim the Crimea had failed, and if not for the French Revolution, the Ottoman Empire's situation could have been much worse.

== See also ==
- Anapa campaign (1787) – first Russian campaign against the Anapa fortress
- Anapa campaign (1788) – second Russian campaign against the Anapa fortress
- Anapa campaign (1790) – third Russian campaign against the Anapa fortress
- Siege of Anapa (1791) – successful Russian siege and capture of the Anapa fortress

== Sources ==
- Bronza, Boro (2010). "The Habsburg Monarchy and the Projects for Division of the Ottoman Balkans, 1771–1788". Empires and Peninsulas: Southeastern Europe between Karlowitz and the Peace of Adrianople, 1699–1829. Berlin: LIT Verlag. pp. 51–62. ISBN 978-3-643-10611-7.
- Cunningham, Allan (1993). Ingram, Edward (ed.). Anglo-Ottoman Encounters in the Age of Revolution: Collected Essays. Frank Cass & Co. Ltd. ISBN 978-0-7146-3494-4.
- Dowling, Timothy C., ed. (2014). Russia at War: From the Mongol Conquest to Afghanistan, Chechnya, and Beyond [2 volumes]. ABC-CLIO. ISBN 978-1-59884-948-6.
- Dowling, Timothy C., ed. (2015). Russia at War: From the Mongol Conquest to Afghanistan, Chechnya, and Beyond. ABC-CLIO. ISBN 978-1-59884-947-9.
- Sicker, Martin (2001). The Islamic World in Decline: From the Treaty of Karlowitz to the Disintegration of the Ottoman Empire. Praeger Publishers. ISBN 978-0-275-96891-5.
- Stone, Bailey (1994). The Genesis of the French Revolution: A Global Historical Interpretation. Cambridge: Cambridge University Press. ISBN 978-0-521-44570-2.
- Tucker, Spencer C. (2011). A Global Chronology Of Conflict. ABC-CLIO. ISBN 978-1-85109-667-1.
- Osipov, Yuri S. (2015). Great Russian Encyclopedia (in Russian). Vol. 29.
- Mayer, Matthew Z. (2004). "The Price for Austria's Security: Part I – Joseph II, the Russian Alliance, and the Ottoman War, 1787–1789". The International History Review. 26 (2): 257–299. doi:10.1080/07075332.2004.9641031.
- Cust, Edward (1859). Annals of the Wars of the Eighteenth Century: Compiled from the Most Authentic Histories of the Period. Vol. 4. London.
- Clodfelter, Micheal (2017). Warfare and Armed Conflicts: A Statistical Encyclopedia of Casualty and Other Figures, 1492–2015 (4th ed.).
- Phillips, Charles; Axelrod, Alan (2005). Encyclopedia of Wars. Vol. 1–3. New York.
- Groß-Hoffinger, Anton Johann (1847). Geschichte Josephs des Zweiten. Leipzig.
