= Nikolay Orlov (military writer) =

Russian military writer

- Николай Орлов
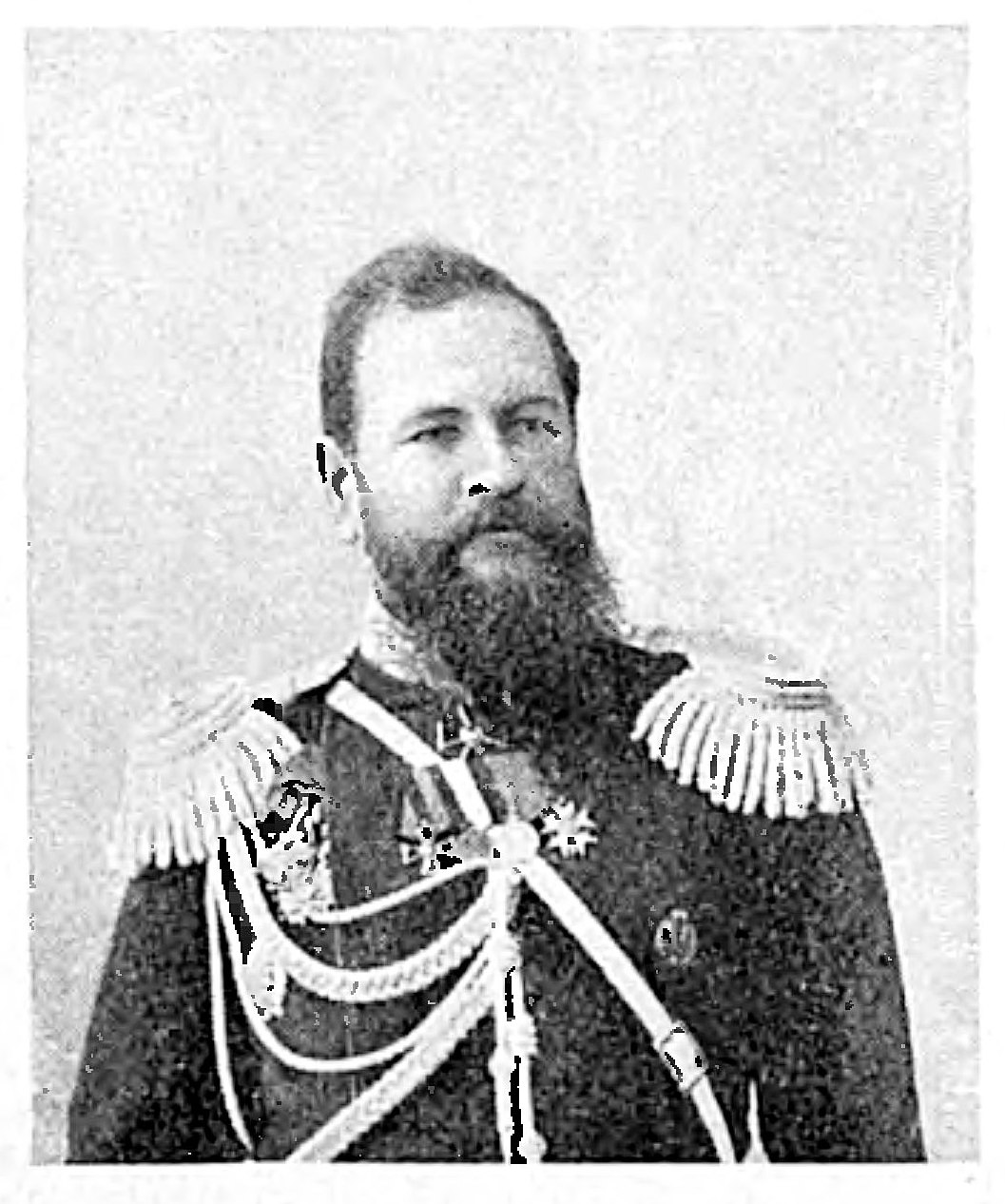
- General-Lieutenant N. A. Orlov. "Sytin Military Encyclopedia" (St. Petersburg, 1911–1915)
- Pronunciation: nʲikʌɭˈɑj ʌrɭˈof
- Citizenship: (Russian Empire)
- Occupations: Military history; Military theory; Military art; Military ballooning
- Years active: from 1881
- Notable work: • The storming of Izmail by Suvorov in 1790; • The storming of Praga by Suvorov in 1794; • Suvorov. Analysis of Suvorov's military actions in Italy in 1799
- Honours: • Professor of the General Staff Academy; • Founding Member of the Imperial Military Historical Society; • Contributor to the "Sytin Military Encyclopedia"
- Military career
- Rank: General-lieutenant
- Conflicts: Boxer Rebellion; Russian invasion of Manchuria; Russo-Japanese War; Battle of Liaoyang; Battle of Mukden
- Alma mater: • Moscow 2nd Cadet Corps; • Mikhailovskoye Artillery Specialized School; • General Staff Academy; • Nikolayevskaya Naval Academy

Nikolay or Nikolai Aleksandrovich Orlov (Russian: Никола́й Алекса́ндрович Орло́в; 1855–1929) was a professor of military art, a military writer, theorist, commander, and a pioneer of aeronautics.

== Career ==
=== Early writing ===
He was educated at the artillery specialized school and the General Staff Academy. His first work on military art — Operations to slow down and prevent the blockade and siege of a fortress (Military Compendium 1881, No. 11 and 12).

Orlov's extensive work: Review of the South-West Theatre of War (Russian: Обзор юго-западного театра войны), compiled in 1886–7, was kept in manuscript in the Military-Scientific Committee. After submitting his dissertation (Suvorov. Analysis of Suvorov's military actions in Italy in 1799 (Russian: Суворов. Разбор военных действий Суворова в Италии в 1799 г.), St. Petersburg, 1892) he was appointed professor at the General Staff Academy in the Department of Military Art, with the appointment to read military history and tactics; at the Nikolayevskaya Naval Academy he taught naval strategy. In his dissertation Orlov held a completely new view of Alexander Suvorov's actions in Italy and especially the battle of Novi. In compiling this work, Orlov used the works of such historians/writers as Dmitry Milyutin, Alexander Petrushevsky, Yegor Fuchs, Wilhelm Rüstow, Nikolay Gryazev, Carl von Clausewitz, and Antoine-Henri Jomini; Orlov studied archival documents, brought French and Austrian sources that had never been translated into Russian, and introduced numerous detailed maps illustrating the warfare. The following works by Orlov are also devoted to Suvorov: The storming of Izmail by Suvorov in 1790 (Russian: Штурм Измаила Суворовым в 1790 г.; St. Petersburg, 1890), Suvorov on the Trebbia in 1799 (Russian: Суворов на Треббии в 1799 г.; St. Petersburg, 1st ed. 1893 and 2nd ed. 1895), The storming of Praga by Suvorov in 1794 (Russian: Штурм Праги Суворовым в 1794 г.; St. Petersburg, 1894); in The Russian Messenger for 1894 and 1896 he elaborated Gryazev's memoirs, in the articles: Suvorov's Italian and Swiss campaign (Russian: Итальянский и Швейцарский поход Суворова) and The return of the Russian troops from Switzerland in 1799 (Russian: Возвращение русских войск из Швейцарии в 1799 г.).

=== Ballooning ===
In 1886 Orlov commanded the ballooning park at the big manoeuvres near Brest and made a flight through Białowieża Forest; after that he made several more flights with scientific purposes. He was the first in Russia to propose to adopt for military ballooning the transportation of hydrogen compressed under high pressures (130 and 200 atmospheres) and the production of hydrogen by factory method by electrolysis using turbines (e.g. waterfalls). Orlov's works on ballooning: Report on the activity of the ballooning park on manoeuvres near Brest in 1886 (Russian: Отчет о деятельности воздухоплавательного парка на маневрах под Брестом в 1886 г.; Engineering Journal, 1887, Nos. 6–7), Dry ballooning parks (Russian: Сухие воздухоплавательные парки; ibid., 1889), Brief description of the material part of the aeronautical department (Russian: Краткое описание материальной части воздухоплавательного отделения; St. Petersburg, 1889); On the tactics of balloons (Russian: О тактике воздушных шаров; St. Petersburg, 1892).

=== Future writing ===
Other works by Orlov: Joint actions of the land army and fleet (Russian: Совместные действия сухопутной армии и флота; St. Petersburg, 1894), The use of three types of weapons under the Italian statute (Russian: Употребление трех родов оружия по итальянскому уставу; St. Petersburg, 1895), Manual for testing for the rank of warrant officer of the reserve (Russian: Руководство для испытания на чин прапорщика запаса; St. Petersburg, 1895), Italians in Abyssinia (Russian: Итальянцы в Абессинии; St. Petersburg, 1896), Guards jaegers under Pavel Petrovich (Russian: Гвардейские егеря при Павле Петровиче; St. Petersburg, 1896), Elementary tactics (Russian: Элементарная тактика; St. Petersburg, 1897), a lithographed course of Marine strategy (Russian: Морской стратегии; 1897). Orlov served as assistant managing editor and supervised the publication of the Encyclopedia of Military and Marine Sciences (St. Petersburg, 1882–97), in which he placed many articles on tactics, strategy, and military history. In 1889 Orlov was promoted to colonel, and in 1899 — to major-general. In 1898 Orlov was granted a massive antique silver ladle by the Highest Order. To facilitate the studies of military youth, Orlov printed several editions of the Manual for the preparation to the test for the rank of ensign of the infantry reserve (Russian: Руководство для подготовки к испытанию на чин прапорщика запаса пехоты) and the same manual for cavalry, The use in battle of 3 types of weapons according to the Italian statutes (Russian: Употребление в бою 3 родов оружия по итальянскому уставу), Sketch of tactics of cavalry according to foreign statutes (Russian: Очерк тактики кавалерии по иностранным уставам), The use of horse artillery in combat (Russian: Употребление конной артиллерии в бою); in addition, under his editorship was published Textbook of tactics (Russian: Учебник тактики) by Konstantin Durop, adopted at that time in all military and junker schools, and 10 editions of Reference book on tactics (Russian: Справочная книжка по тактике) by Nikolay V. Levitsky, then known in the Russian Army.

=== Boxers ===
29 June 1900. (Note: Converted to the N.S.) Orlov received an offer to go to the Far East, to take part in military operations in China, and on the 30th left for Chita, where he was to form the Hailar Detachment, the chief of which he was appointed, and at the same time was appointed commander of the Transbaikal Cossack Brigade by the Highest Order. The Hailar Detachment, composed almost exclusively of preferential Cossacks, was entrusted with the defence of Transbaikalia. The movement deep into Manchuria was considered risky due to the alleged lack of water. However, having in mind to act actively, the Hailar Detachment invaded Manchuria on 23 July, on 30 July broke the Chinese hoard near Ongun (3 steel Krupp guns were taken), pursued them and took the town of Hailar on 3 August. On the 14th of August the Hailar Detachment defeated a new accumulation of Chinese at Yakeshi, and on the 24th of August attacked the Chinese army, which had gathered again at the fortified position on the Greater Khingan ridge, and dispersed it, taking 5 steel Krupp guns and the whole transport. Having no more enemy in front of him, Orlov moved quickly (339.2 km [210.7 mi] in 10 days) to Qiqihar, where he joined the detachment of General Rennenkampf and advanced the latter to Boduna, where the Hailar Detachment also moved, due to the news about the appearance of a new Chinese army. From Boduna Orlov advanced General Rennenkampf to Jilin, where he also moved with the Hailar Detachment, but, by order of his superiors, was forced to turn to Harbin. During this war, in one of the reconnaissance missions, a horse fell under Orlov and he broke 3 ribs.

=== War with Japan ===
After demobilization of the detachment Orlov was appointed chief of the 54th Infantry Reserve Brigade, which with the Russo-Japanese War's beginning in 1904 he mobilized and deployed in the V Siberian Corps, and was appointed commander of one of its divisions, namely the 54th. Upon arrival to the Manchurian Army Orlov participated in the combats near Liaoyang, on the left flank, at the Yantai Mines. Here on 2 September he took part in a hand-to-hand infantry fight, being on horseback the whole time, and was wounded from 20 paces in the stomach by two bullets and concussed by two more. In the official history of the Russian–Japanese war of 1904–5 (3rd part of III volume, pp. 223–242) Orlov's actions are described in detail. Having received relief from wounds, but not yet cured completely, Orlov, at the General Kuropatkin's invitation, returned to the army and was appointed chief of the 3rd Infantry Division, with which he was in constant fighting in the winter of 1904–5, occupying with his division the closest position to the Japanese trenches. In the battle of Mukden Orlov commanded the rearguard of the XVII Army Corps and on 10 March endured a day of hard fighting in 3 consecutive positions. During the Mukden combats Orlov's division suffered a loss of 5,700 people, and he himself was shell-shocked in the head, but he did not leave the command and continued to be the chief of the rearguard until the army stopped at the Sipingjie positions: then he was appointed chief of the 3rd Army's advance guard and commanded it until the peace was ratified. In 1905 Orlov was promoted to lieutenant-general. In February 1906 Orlov returned to Russia with the 3rd Infantry Division and commanded it until 1910, when he was named commander of the 12th Infantry Division.

=== Later career ===
Having switched from professorship to military service, Orlov published: Zabaikals in Manchuria – sketch of the campaign of the Hailar Detachment (Russian: Забайкальцы в Манчжурии — очерк похода Хайларского отряда); The Battle of Grunwald in 1410 (Russian: Сражение при Грюнвальде в 1410 г.); The war for the liberation of Germany in 1813 and the deposition of Napoleon in 1814 (Russian: Война за освобождение Германии в 1813 г. и низложение Наполеона в 1814 г.); The pacification of the Polish rebellion in 1831 and in 1863 (Russian: Усмирение польского мятежа в 1831 г. и в 1863 г.); Organisation of field trips to France (Russian: Организация полевых поездок во Францию); Combat shooting with manoeuvring (Russian: Боевая стрельба с маневрированием).

Orlov was a founding member of the Imperial Military Historical Society and a contributor to the "Sytin Military Encyclopedia".
