= Battle of Kinburn =

Battle of Kinburn may refer to several battles fought at Kinburn:

- Siege of Kinburn (1771), waged during the Russo-Turkish War (1768–1774)
- Battle of Kinburn (1787), part of the Russo-Turkish War (1787–1792)
- Battle of Kinburn (1855), a naval engagement during the Crimean War
