= Aydoslu Mehmed Pasha =

Ottoman statesman and general

Aydoslu Mehmed Pasha, also called Aidos Mehmed Pasha, was an 18th-century Ottoman statesman and military officer.

Aydoslyu Mehmed Pasha is best known for serving as the chief commander of the Izmail garrison during the Siege of Izmail in 1790 during the Russo-Turkish War of 1787–1792. He was captured by the Russians after the battle. He was one of the best and most experienced Ottoman generals during his lifetime.

He later returned to Ottoman service, and in 1791 was appointed Beylerbey of the Rumelia Eyalet.
