= Albanian Battalion =

Units of the Russian Imperial Army composed mostly of Albanians

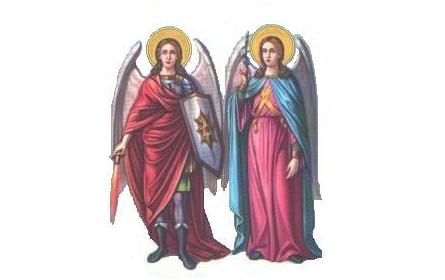
The members of the Albanian battalions were primarily from Himarë

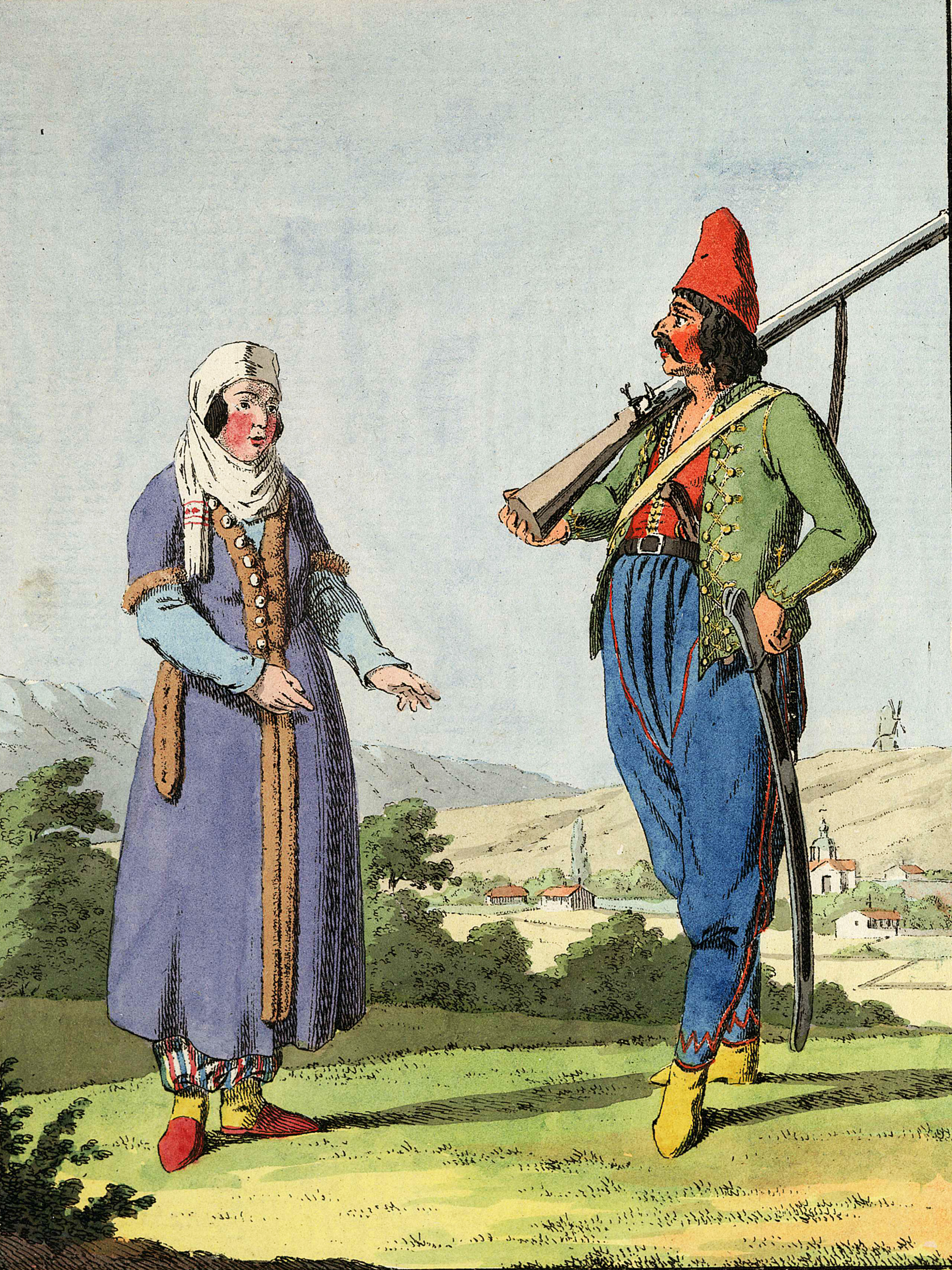
Arnaut of the Albanian battalion with his wife

The Albanian Battalions (1775–1859) were ethnic units of the Russian Imperial Army that were made up mostly of Albanians; fighting against the Ottoman Empire.

The Himarë region had been de facto independent from the Ottoman Empire, even if it had nominally submitted to it. In the 16th century, Himariots had served in the Spanish and Venetian armies. By 1735, Naples had also made its own Albanian guard. Russian influence was felt across the Balkans, including the Albanians. Among those visiting Moscow to request humanitarian aid was Archbishop Gabriel in 1586, Bishop Theophilus in 1587, the Patriarch of Ohrid Athanasius, and Neofil of Korca.

As Albanian revolts broke out in the early 1700s, the Emperor of Russia Peter the Great sent letters of thanks to tribes of Albania for their help and praised their bravery and sacrifice. This led to the opening of Russian consulates in Albania.

In 1759, representatives of Himara address Russia's Tsarina, Elizabeth of Russia with a letter expressing their will to fight for Russia. In 1760, Captain Spiro Bixhili, on behalf of the Assembly, handed a letter to the Russian ambassador to the Ottoman Empire, A. Obreskov. It stated that the Himariots expressed loyalty to Russia and their readiness to carry out diversion actions against the Turks in times of war, and their desire to create one or two military regiments in peacetime. Obreskov responded that Russia could not accept the creation of these units in times of peace, but it would be accepted during war. The Himariots, responding to the Russian call, joined the Russian forces and participated in the Russo-Turkish war of 1768-1774. During this time they were distinguished for bravery, and were admired by the Russian generals.

Over 1,000 Himariot and Morean Albanians moved to Russia in 1774, and continued until 1776. After the union of Crimea with Russia, Albanian emigrants, together with Greek immigrants, settled in various villages, including Odessa. Another migration wave could have of occurred during Russian rule in Corfu in the years 1799–1807, when a unit called the "Albanian hunters" was formed under Admiral Ushakov.

On March 28, 1775, an Albanian battalion, mostly from Himara and some from Morea, was formed and served in the Russian fleet. They were stationed in the Krec and Enikale fortresses. August 3, 1779, the Albanian battalion was renamed to the Greek Battalion, and this led to the schism and reforming of the battalion in April 1795. An array of reconfigurations of Albanian soldiers followed, until the final disbanding of the Albanian Balaclava battalion in 1859. Alternatively, they were also called the 'Greek Battalion' at many points. In its total history, the units had served in the Russo-Turkish wars of 1768-1774, 1787-1792, 1806-1812, and in the Crimean War.

There is also a widespread legend of an 'amazon unit' consisting of the sisters, daughters, and spouses of the Albanian militants of the Ballaclava Battalion. They were described as "dressed in Albanian costumes, embroidered with gold and purloins, with ornamented gold and feather on the head, with faces that radiate indescribable grace."

== See also ==
- Albanians in Ukraine
- Albanians in Russia
- Albania–Russia relations
