= Mikhail Matveevich Ivanov =

Russian painter, watercolorist and Academician

- Михаил Матвеевич Иванов
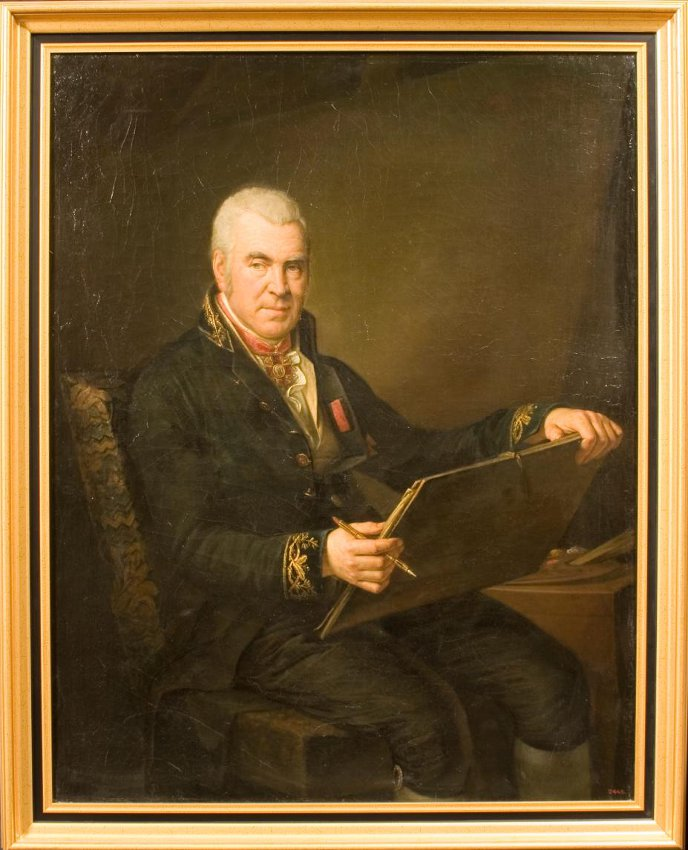
- Yakov Vasilyev, Mikhail Matveevich Ivanov, 1818, oil on canvas; Museum of the Academy of Arts, Saint Petersburg
- Born: 1748; St. Petersburg
- Died: 1823 (aged 74–75); St. Petersburg
- Education: Imperial Academy of Arts
- Known for: Watercolour painting

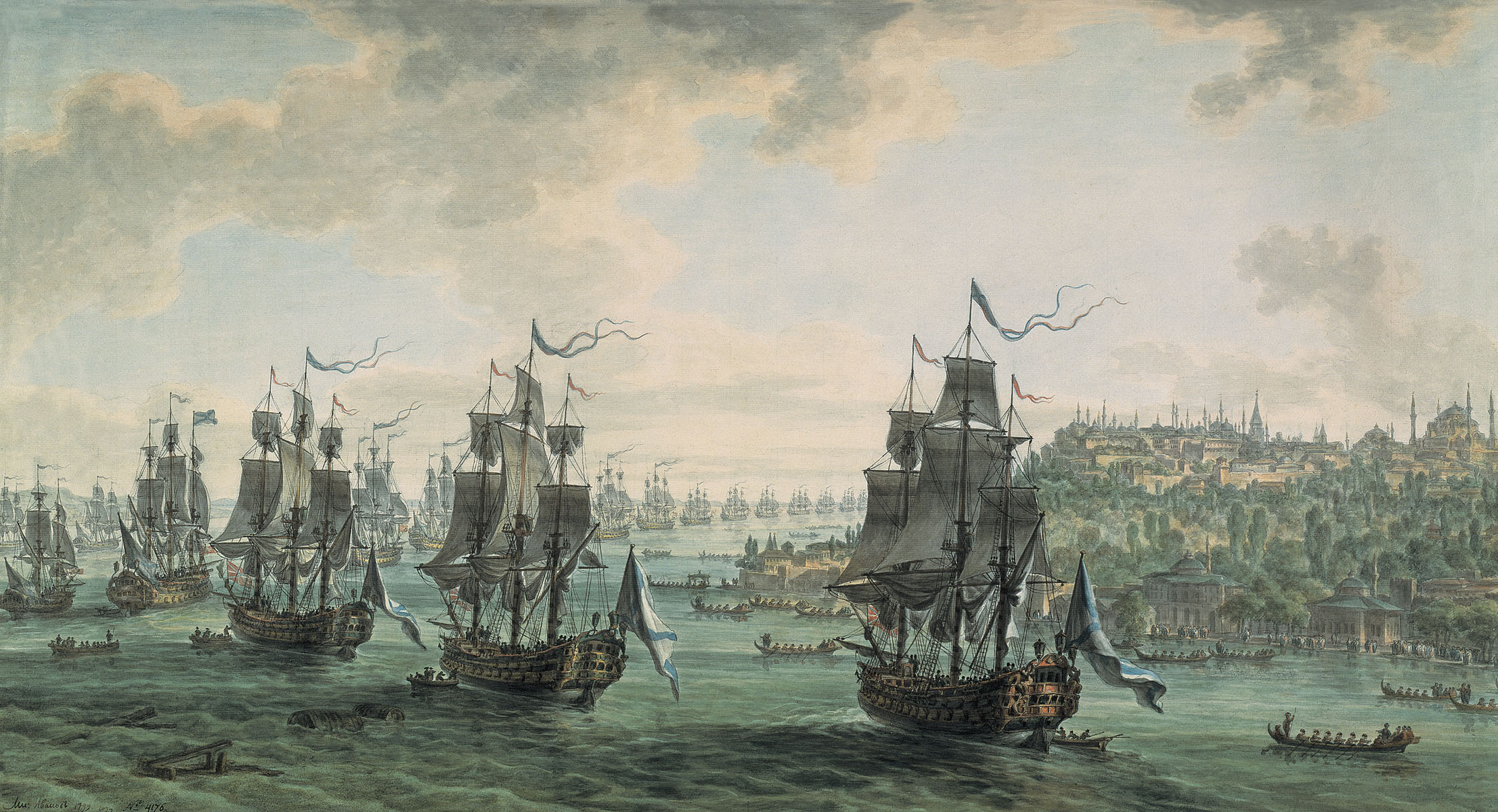
Russian fleet under the command of Admiral Fyodor Ushakov, sailing through the Bosphorus

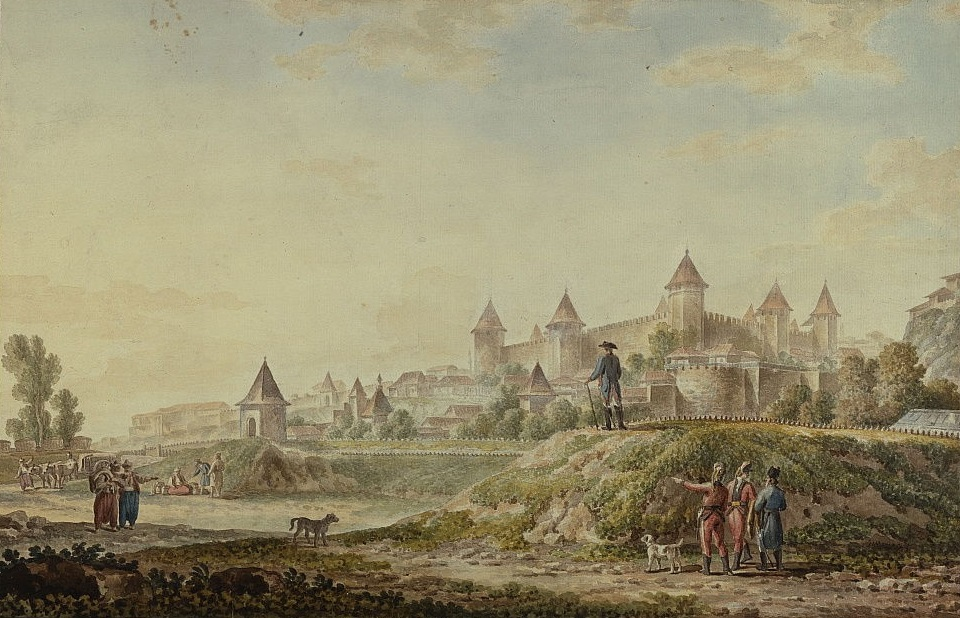
View of the fortress in Bendery

Mikhail Matveevich Ivanov (Russian: Михаи́л Матве́евич Ива́нов; 1748, St. Petersburg – 28 (16) August 1823, St. Petersburg) was a Russian painter, watercolorist, and Academician.

== Biography ==
His father was a soldier in the Semyonovsky Regiment. In 1762, he and his brother, Arkhip were admitted to the Imperial Academy of Arts. He initially took practical courses on painting with varnishes then, in 1764, became a student of Ivan Groot, who instructed him in painting birds, animals and flowers. He was awarded a silver medal in 1769, followed by a gold medal in 1770, for his landscape with staffage, depicting an olive tree with military paraphernalia, soldiers and shepherds. This also earned him a study trip to Western Europe.

In Paris he studied with Jean-Baptiste Le Prince, with whom he copied landscapes by the Old Masters. He was especially drawn to Dutch and Flemish artists.

In 1773, he and Arkhip went to Rome, where he painted landscapes en plein aire and copied more of the Old Masters, many of which he sent back to the Academy. By the time he returned to Russia, in 1779, he had travelled through Spain and Switzerland. Upon his return, the Academy recognized him as a candidate for the title of "Academician".

In 1780, he was assigned to accompany Prince Grigory Potemkin and, per the Prince's instructions, paint all places and events that were in any way "remarkable". He made numerous drawings and watercolors throughout Crimea and the Caucasus, as well as battle scenes, depicting the Siege of Ochakov (1788) and the Siege of Izmail (1790). It was during this time, in 1785, that he was finally named an Academician. His last work on this assignment was a depiction of Potemkin's death in Bessarabia (1791), which was engraved by Gavriil Skorodumov and widely distributed.

After that, he returned to St. Petersburg and served as curator at the Hermitage Museum. In 1792, he married Skorodumov's widow, Maria Ivanovna. From 1800, he taught classes in battle painting at the Academy. From 1804, he also taught landscape painting.

== Some of the works ==
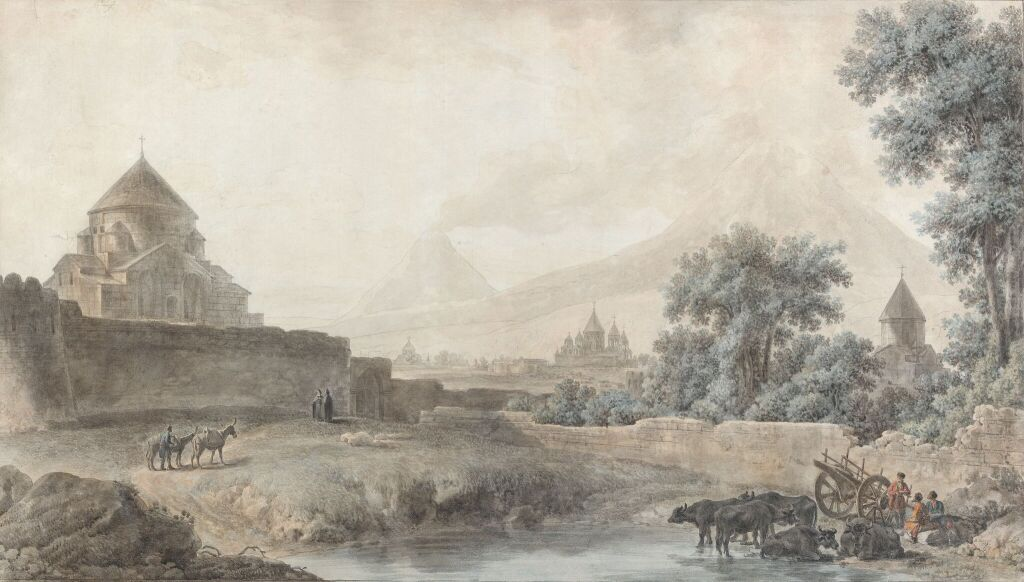
View of three churches against the backdrop of Mount Ararat in Armenia

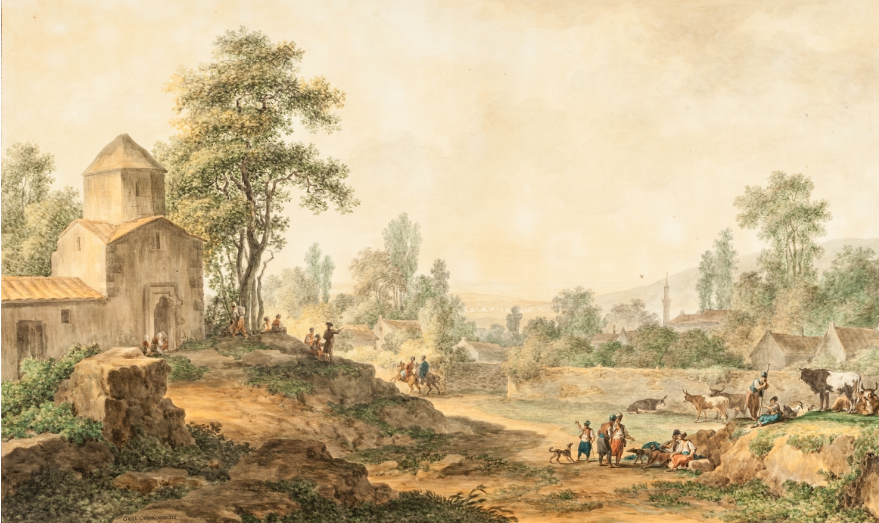
Staryi Krym (Landscape with Armenian church)

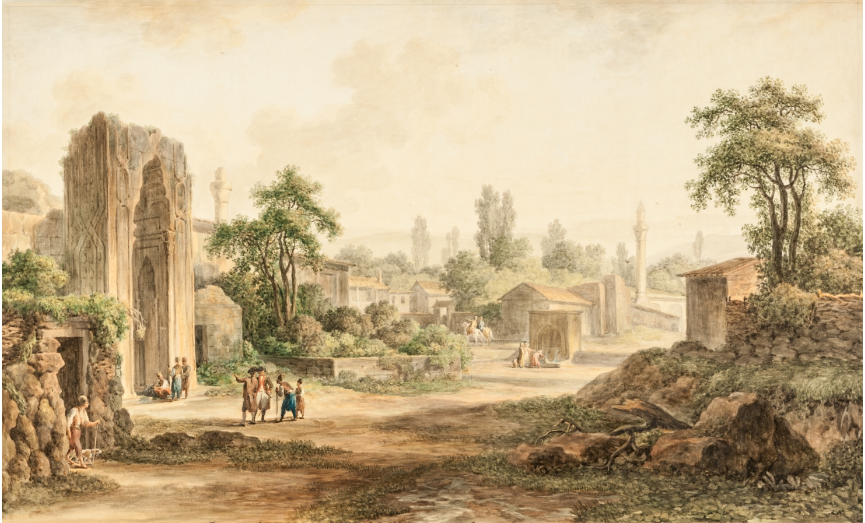
Ruins of a school (portal of the madrasah of Khan Ozbek)

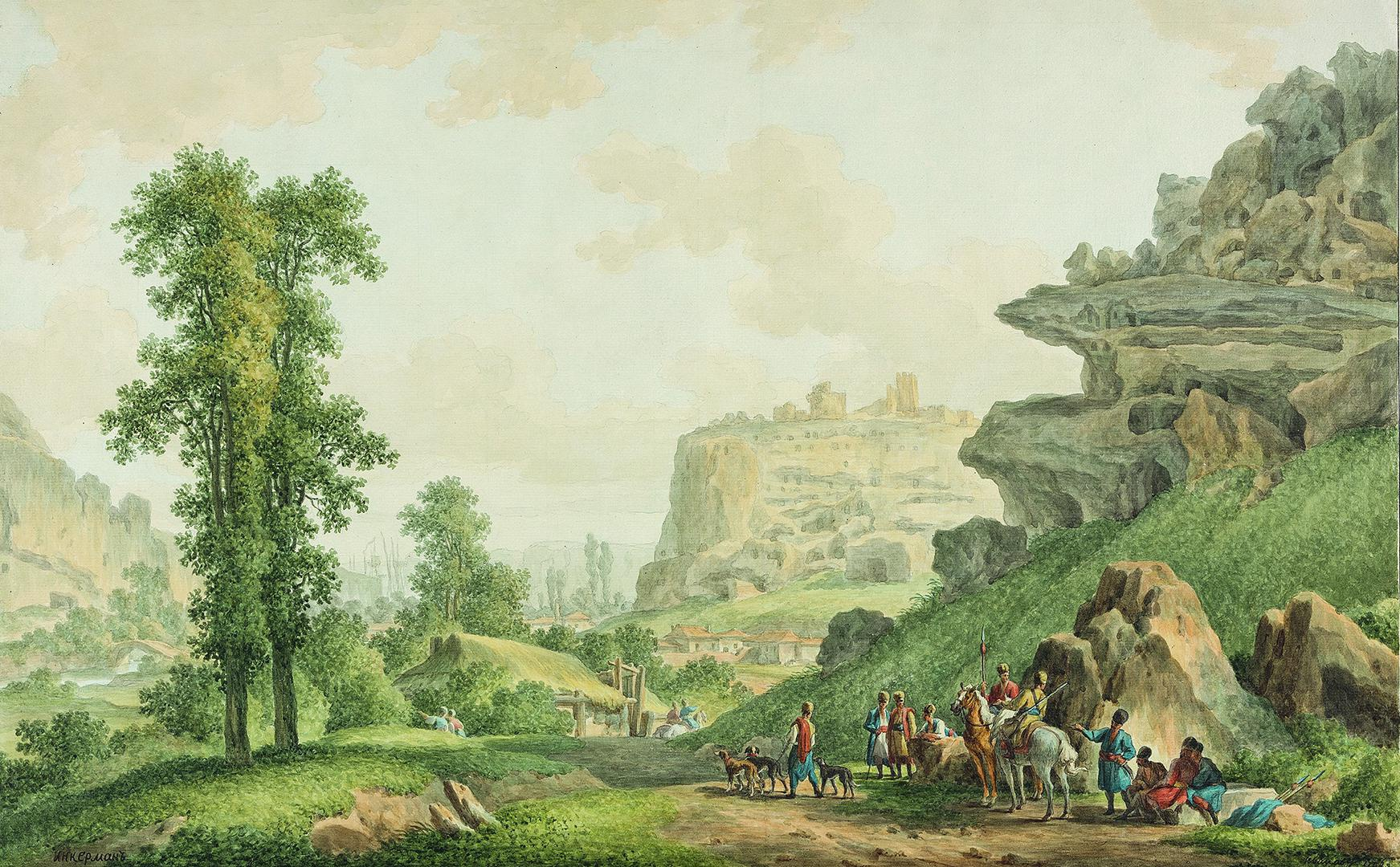
View of Inkerman Fortress in Crimea

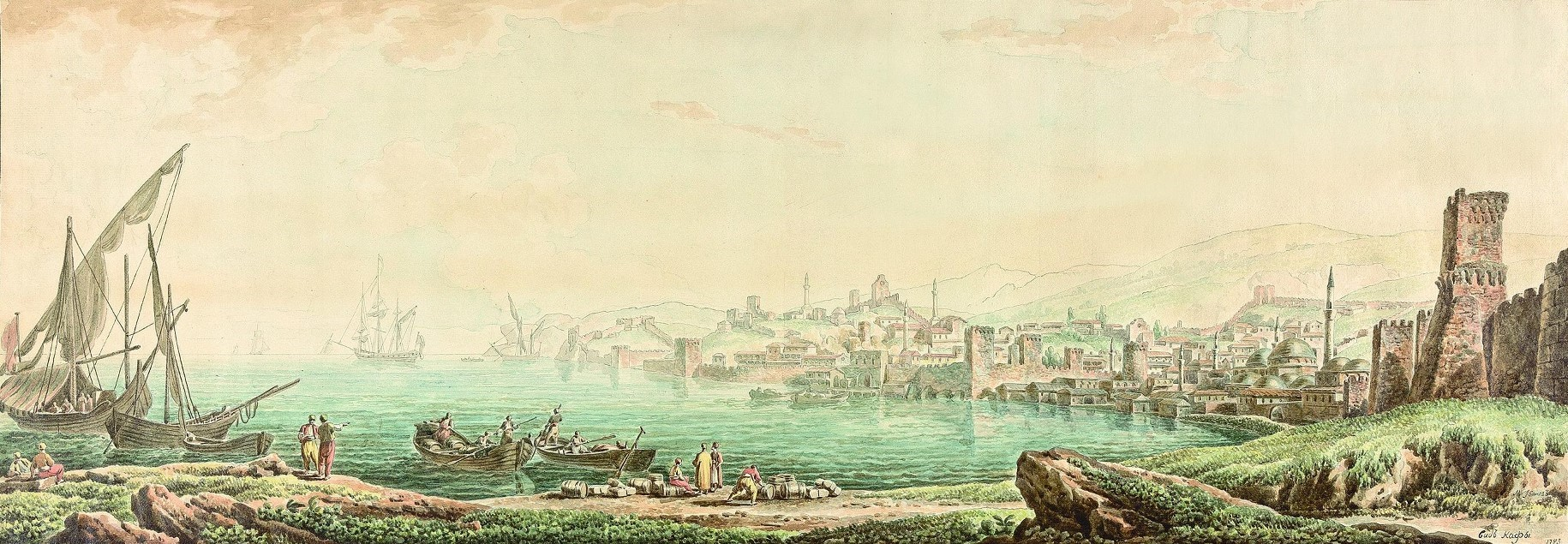
Panorama of the fortress of Feodosia (Kaffa)

== Sources ==
- "ИВАНОВ МИХАИЛ МАТВЕЕВИЧ • Great Russian Encyclopedia – Electronic version". old.bigenc.ru. 2023.
