= Ippolit Bogdanovich =

Russian poet (1743–1803)

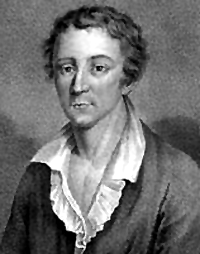
- Born: 23 December 1743; Perevolochna, Poltava Regiment, Cossack Hetmanate
- Died: 6 January 1803 (aged 59); Kursk, Kursk Governorate, Russian Empire
- Education: Imperial Moscow University (1763)
- Occupations: Poet, editor
- Relatives: Modest Ivanovich Bogdanovich (nephew)
- Writing career
- Notable work: Poem Dushenka
- Movement: Rococo

Ippolit Fyodorovich Bogdanovich (Russian: Ипполи́т Фёдорович Богдано́вич, IPA: [ɪpɐˈlʲit ˈfʲɵdərəvʲɪdʑ bəɡdɐˈnovʲɪtɕ]; 3 January 1744 [O.S. 23 December 1743] – 18 January [O.S. 6 January] 1803) was a Russian classicist and rococo author of light poetry, best known for his long poem Dushenka (1778).

== Biography ==
Coming from a noble Ukrainian family, Bogdanovich studied in the Moscow University until 1761. His literary career started two years later with editing a literary journal. In 1766, he joined the Russian embassy in Dresden as a secretary. Three years later, he was back in Saint Petersburg, where he edited the only regular official newspaper, the Vedomosti, between 1775 and 1782. In 1788, Bogdanovich was appointed Director of State Archives, a post which he treated as a sinecure, translating Voltaire, Diderot, and Rousseau at loose hours.

It was in 1778 that Bogdanovich brought out his only work of lasting fame, Dushenka. This long poem, resembling a mock epic, was a reworking of La Fontaine's Psyche, a subject originating from Apuleius but ingeniously stylized by Bogdanovich as a Russian folk tale. The definitive edition followed in 1783 and instantly became popular for its mildly scurrilous passages. La Fontaine's conventional heroine was presented by Bogdanovich as "a living, modern girl from a gentry family of the middling sort". Following the publication, Bogdanovich was recognized as the foremost Russian practitioner of light poetry and gained admission into the literary circle of Princess Dashkova, while Catherine II of Russia engaged him to write several comedies for her Hermitage Theatre. An English translation can be found in the anthology The Literature of Eighteenth-Century Russia.

== Assessment ==
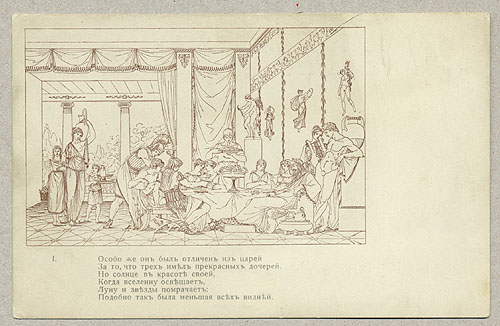
One of Tolstoy's Neoclassical illustrations to Dushenka (1820-33).

By 1841, Bogdanovich's chef d'oeuvre went through 15 editions. Today, it is remembered primarily for Fyodor Tolstoy's Neoclassical illustrations and citations in Pushkin's works such as Eugene Onegin. Indeed, Dushenka was a major influence on young Pushkin, who avidly read the poem during his Lyceum years but later discarded Bogdanovich's verse as immature.

Nabokov summed up contemporary opinion about Dushenka in the following dictum: "The airiness of its tetrametric passages and its glancing mother-of-pearl wit are foregleams of young Pushkin's art; it is a significant stage in the development of Russian poetry; its naive colloquial melodies also influenced Pushkin's direct predecessors, Karamzin, Batyushkov, and Zhukovsky".

== Bibliography ==
- Imperial Moscow University: 1755-1917: encyclopedic dictionary. A. Andreev, D. Tsygankov. Moscow: Russian political encyclopedia (ROSSPEN). 2010. pp. 83–84. ISBN 978-5-8243-1429-8.
