= Nikolay Mordvinov (admiral) =

Russian admiral and statesman (1754–1845)

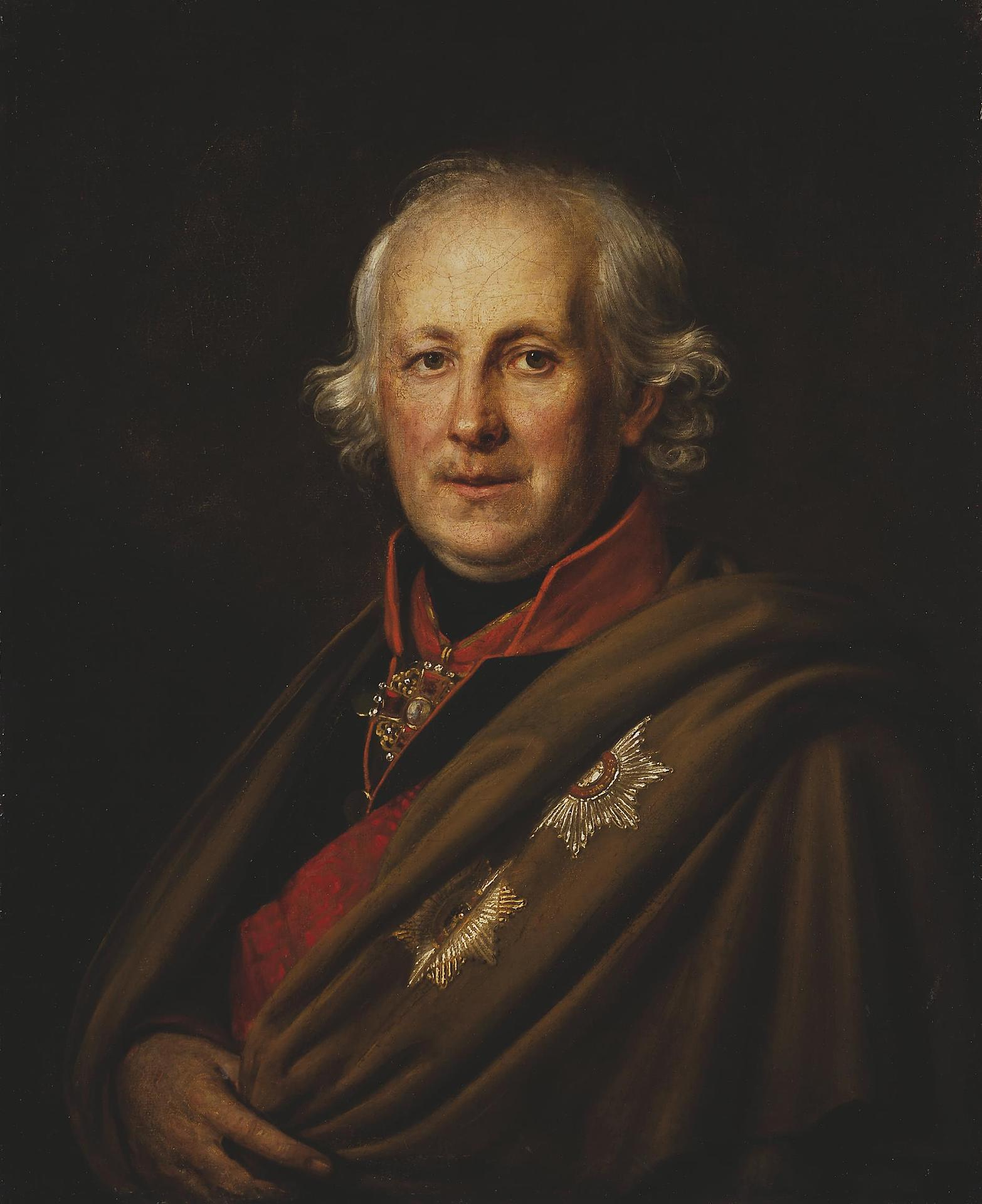

Vice-President of the Admiralty
- In office 1799–1802
- Monarchs: Paul I Alexander I

Minister of the Imperial Navy
- In office 28 December 1802 – 8 September 1802
- Monarch: Alexander I
- Preceded by: Office Established
- Succeeded by: Pavel Chichagov

Military service
- Branch/service: Imperial Russian Navy
- Rank: Admiral

Count Nikolay Semyonovich Mordvinov (Russian: Николай Семёнович Мордвинов; 17 April 1754 – 30 March 1845) was a Russian political thinker of Alexander I's reign. He is associated with the reforms of Mikhail Speransky, who he advised on the ways to improve the performance of the national economy.

Mordvinov was an admiral's son and started his career in the Navy at an early age. He started his service in 1766 in the rank of midshipman. An Anglophile like his peer Chichagov, he spent three years – from 1774 to 1777 – serving on English ships in British North America. In 1783, he accompanied Chichagov during his expedition into the Mediterranean. However, he felt ill at ease with Potemkin's and de Ribas's management of the Imperial Russian Navy and retired in the late 1780s after opposing the Turkish siege of Kinburn in 1787.

His career took a leap forward under Emperor Paul, who shared his intense dislike of Potemkin's coterie and recalled Mordvinov to service with the rank of admiral. In 1799, he was appointed Vice-President of the Admiralty. Three years later, when the Admiralty was transformed into the Navy Ministry, he became the first Navy Minister of Imperial Russia, but ceded this post to Pavel Chichagov within three months.

Mordvinov's independent-mindedness and Anglophile way of life made him a darling of the Muscovite society. In 1806, the Muscovite nobility elected him to lead a volunteer corps rallied against Napoleon. He became particularly popular with young liberals, who admired his courage to oppose the government when needed. Both Kondraty Ryleev and Alexander Pushkin dedicated enthusiastic poems to him.

He considered serfdom to be the main obstacle to the successful economic development of Russia, and wrote that "Freedom, property, enlightenment and justice are the main and only origins of wealth". He also advocated free enterprise, principles of private property and, like Vorontsov, defended a protectionist customs tariff.

In 1823, Mordvinov was elected President of the Free Economic Society, a high-profile position which he filled for 17 years. During his term in office, he outlined his economic views in a number of writings. Mordvinov died at the age of 90 in St Petersburg.

== Honours and awards ==
- Order of St. Andrew
- Order of St. Alexander Nevsky
- Order of St. Vladimir, 1st class
- Order of St. Anne, 1st class
