= Modest Ivanovich Bogdanovich =

Russian lieutenant-general and military historian

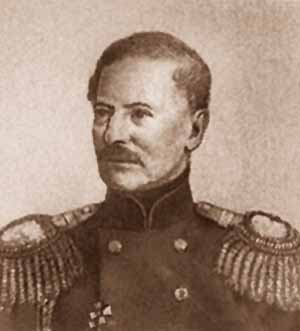
Modest Ivanovich Bogdanovich

Modest Ivanovich Bogdanovich (Russian: Моде́ст Ива́нович Богдано́вич; 26 August / 7 September 1805, Sumy – 25 July / 6 August 1882, Oranienbaum, Saint Petersburg) was a Russian lieutenant-general and military historian from the nobility of Kharkov Governorate. A nephew of the poet Ippolit Bogdanovich, Modest became an officer in 1823 and served in the war against the Poles. In 1839 he became professor of military history and strategy at the St. Petersburg Military Academy.

== Works ==
- Описание походов графа Радецкого в Италии 1848 и 1849 годов (Description of Count Radetzky's campaigns in Italy in 1848 and 1849). St. Petersburg (1849)
- История военного искусства и замечательнейших походов, от начала войн до настоящего времени (History of military art and most remarkable campaigns, from the beginning of wars to the present time). In 2 parts. St. Petersburg (1849–1853)
- Поход 1796 года Бонапарта в Италии (Bonaparte's Campaign in Italy of 1796). St. Petersburg (1859–60)
- Походы Румянцева, Потемкина и Суворова в Турции (Rumyantsev's, Potemkin's and Suvorov's campaigns in Turkey). Saint Petersburg (1852)
- История Отечественной войны 1812 года (History of the Patriotic War of 1812). 2 volumes. St. Petersburg (1861)
- История войны 1813 года (History of the War of 1813). St. Petersburg (1863–69)
- История войны 1814 года во Франции и низложения Наполеона I (History of the War of 1814 and the Deposition of Napoleon I). 2 volumes. St. Petersburg (1865)
- История царствования императора Александра I (History of the Rule of Alexander I). 6 vols. St. Petersburg (1869–71)
- Восточная война 1853—1856 гг. (The oriental war of 1854–56). 4 vols. St. Petersburg (1876)
