= Battle of Kinburn (1787) =

Part of the Russo-Turkish War (1787–1792)

Coordinates: 46°34′19″N 31°33′35″E

The Battle of Kinburn
- Part of the Russo-Turkish War (1787–1792)
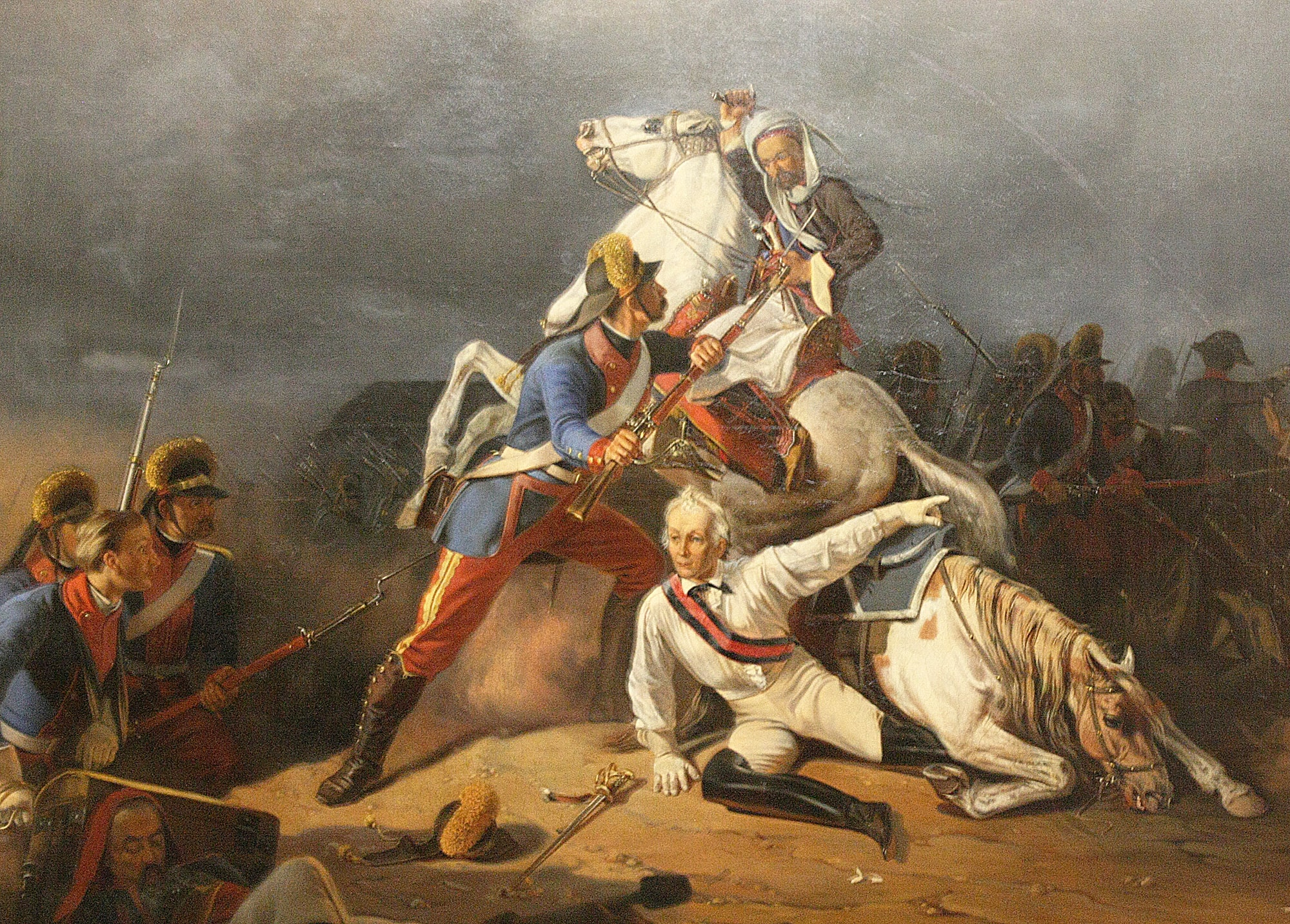
- Grenadier Novikov saves Suvorov from a Turkish warrior
Date	12 October 1787 (N.S.) (Note: The siege of Kinburn began on 25 September 1787 (N.S.). This is part of the so-called "Kinburn defensive operation of September 3 – October 13, 1787" (N.S.).); 1 October 1787 (O.S.) (Note: The siege of Kinburn began on 14 September 1787 (O.S.). This is part of the so-called "Kinburn defensive operation of August 23 – October 2, 1787" (O.S.).)
Location	Near Özi (Ochakov) on a sand bank forming a part of the Dnieper river delta.
Result	Russian victory

Belligerents
Ottoman Empire: • Algiers	Russian Empire

Commanders and leaders
Landing party: Janissary Agha Serben-Geşti-Eyyub-Ağa; Fleet near Ochakov: Giritli Hüseyin Pasha (Hussein Pasha) Said Ali	In Kinburn: (Russian Empire) Ivan von Reck (WIA); Reinforcements: (Russian Empire) Alexander Suvorov (WIA); Squadron: (Russian Empire) Rear Adm. Nikolay Mordvinov (Russian Empire) Midn. Giuliano Lombardo

Strength
Landing party: 5,000 men Fleet near Ochakov: 3 ships of the line; 4 frigates; 4 bomb vessels (floating batteries); 14 gunboats; 23 transport vessels; overall ~400 guns.	In Kinburn: 1,500 infantry; 319 guns.; Reinforcements: 2,500 inf. and light cav.; 1,500+ Cossacks; (Note: A total of 3 regiments of Cossack cavalry, numbering over 1,500 men. (regiments of Cossacks are divided into sotnias, which must have more than 100 people; there are Cossack regiments with five, and there are regiments with seven sotnias)); 38 guns.; Division: 2 frigates; 4 galleys.; Available on land: 12,000 men

Casualties and losses
4,000 to 5,000 (including 2 French officers): 3,000 killed and wounded; 2,000 prisoners	1,000: 250 killed; 750 wounded

The storming or battle of Kinburn (also Kılburun; Russian: Кинбурнская баталия, Turkish: Kılburun Muharebesi) was fought on 11–12 October^{N.S.}/30 September – 1 October^{O.S.} 1787 (Note: The dates include the bombardment with which the landing was supported; shelling from Ottoman ships began the day before the land clash.) as part of the Russo-Turkish War (1787–1792). It ended in victory for the Russian army and naval forces.

A weak fortress, Kinburn was located opposite Ochakov on a sand bank forming a part of the Dnieper river delta. It covered approaches to the fleet base at Kherson. The reason for the Ottoman attack on the Kinburn Spit was to deprive the enemy of a base for the siege of Ochakov and Kherson fleet base.

== The forces ==
Alexander Suvorov, commanding the Russian garrison, had 19 bronze and 300 iron artillery pieces in the fortress, weak in power and range, 1,500 infantry in Kinburn and 2,500 infantry or light cavalry, 28 regimental and 10 field guns, and Cossack cavalry within 30 versts (roughly 32 kilometers / 19 miles) from the fortress.

Near Ochakov, the Ottomans had three 60 gun ships of the line, four 34 gun frigates, four bomb vessels (floating batteries), and 14 gunboats with 4 guns each. Altogether, about 400 guns. The Ottoman troops were carried by 23 transport vessels.

== First attack ==
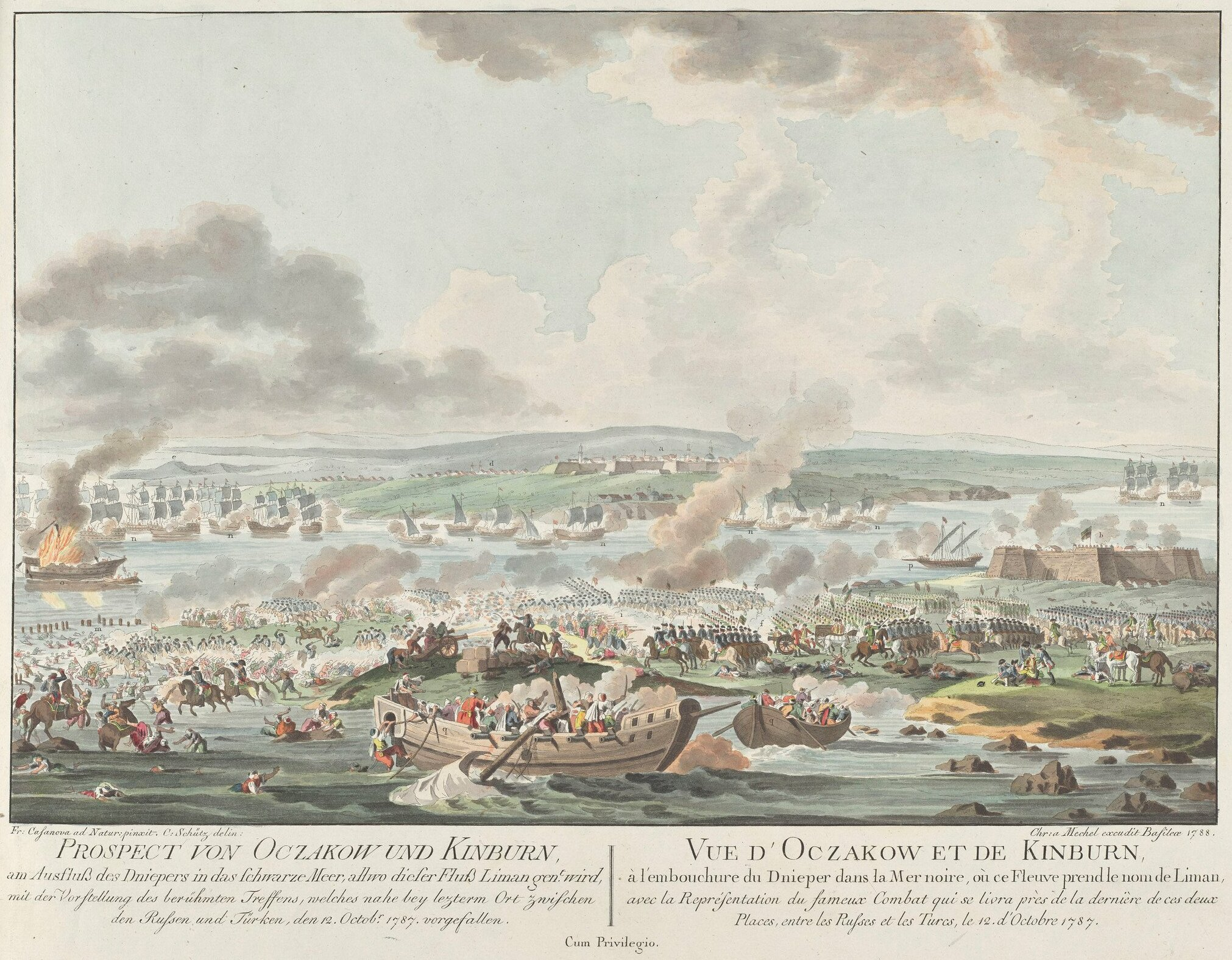
A view of the Battle of Ochakov and Kinburn, on 12 October 1787

During September, the Ottoman fleet twice carried out ranging fire of the fleet against the coast, trying to locate position of the Russian gun emplacements. During one bombardment, a Russian galley Desna which was part of a force of two frigates and four galleys (themselves a part of Admiral Mordvinov's squadron that sent these ships to assist in the defence of Kinburn), intervened on the initiative of its Maltese captain, and drove off the Ottoman gunboats. On the 11 October bombardment of Kinburn was conducted from the Ottoman ships again. Under the cover of this bombing, now more intense, on 12 October 1787 at 9 in the morning an amphibious landing of 6,000 troops was conducted on two separate sites (5,300 on the bank's 'tongue' itself, and the rest 10–15 versts away at a village of Bienka), with the fleet supporting the landing with fire. The landing consisted of shipboard soldiers, composing of Turks, Greeks, and part of the Ochakov garrison (about 600 people). The commander of the landing force was Serben-Geşti-Eyyub-Ağa Janissary. The pasha of Ochakov ordered the ships to leave after the landing so that the amphibious landing force would not contemplate withdrawal. The landing force begun to dig a total of 15 trenches, in the attempt to move closer to Kinburn.

Suvorov called for reinforcement (2,500 infantry and Cossacks) and waited, while being occupied with public prayer in the church (Celebration of the Covering), receiving dispatches and messages in the church.

== Counterattack ==
At midday the Turks approached to within 200 paces of the fortress. Suvorov began pulling troops towards Kinburn, while at the same time the first counterattack was launched, with 1,500 soldiers of the Oryol infantry and Schlisselburg grenadier regiments leading the attack, under the command of Major General Ivan von Reck. Those attacking troops took 10 of the 15 trenches, but further, due to the loss of most of the leaders (General Reck commanding the garrison of Kinburn was seriously wounded), under flank fire of the Ottoman fleet, and the tenacity of the Turks, to which the reinforcements arrived, came to disarray and were forced to retreat to the fortress; then, Suvorov himself led the Russian forces into new, even more fierce fight. Suvorov was wounded in the side of the body and in the left hand. The news of this shook the troops, and they retreated again. Suvorov was saved only through the courage of Stepan Novikov, a grenadier of the Schlisselburg Grenadier Regiment.

At 16.00 hours Russian reinforcements approached and Suvorov repeated his attack, after releasing Cossacks to attack around the left flank of the enemy over the shoals and into their rear. This attack was successful, and Turks were forced out from the trenches and forced against the coast, forcing the fleet to cease fire in order not to hit its own troops. Suvorov had two horses shot under him. The regimental guns were able to fire canister at point-blank range, causing fearful carnage among the Turks.

At night 600 Turk survivors of the landing returned on board the ships by rowboats. Several hundred hid in the reeds, and were attacked by Cossacks on the following morning. Russian losses were 2 officers and 136 others killed and 17 officers and 300 others wounded, and those of the Turk – about 4,000, including two French officers dressed as Turks which were sent to Siberia.

In Suvorov's report the Schlisselburg regiment is particularly noted for bravery. For the Kinburn victory Catherine the Great awarded Suvorov with the Order of St. Andrew and the highest praise, where she wrote: "You deserved it by faith and by faithfulness".

== Troop schedule ==
Russians 13 Oct. (N.S.)
Unit types	The formations
Infantry	Oryol Regt
Inf.	Shlisselburg Regt
Inf.	Kozlov Regt
Inf.	Murom Regt: • 1 bn
Hussars	Mariupol Regt
Hussars	Pavlograd Regt
Dragoons	Saint Petersburg Regt: • arrived at the end of the battle
Don Cossacks	3 regiments: • arrived at the end of the battle

== See also ==
- Battle of Kinburn (1855)

== Bibliography ==
- Bodart, Gaston (1908). Militär-historisches Kriegs-Lexikon (1618–1905) (in German). Vienna and Leipzig: C. W. Stern.
- Широкорад А. Б. Русско-Турецкие войны (под общ. ред. Тараса А. Е.); Minsk: Harvest, 2000. "Сражение за Лиман и Кинбурнская победа".
- Лукирский А. Н. Сражение при Кинбурне 1 октября 1787 г. ВОИН № 12.
- Grant, R. G. (2017). 1001 Battles That Changed the Course of History. Chartwell Books. ISBN 978-0-7858-3553-0.
- Velichko, Konstantin; Novitsky, Vasily; Schwarz, Aleksey von; Apushkin, Vladimir; Schulz, Gustav von (1913). Sytin Military Encyclopedia (in Russian). Vol. XII: Кальяри – Коалиционные войны. Типография Т-ва И. Д. Сытина. pp. 528–531.
- Dal, Vladimir (1882). Explanatory Dictionary of the Living Great Russian Language (in Russian). Vol. 4. St. Petersburg: Типография М. О. Вольфа. p. 289.
- Petrov, Andrey N. (1880). Вторая турецкая война в царствование императрицы Екатерины II. 1787–1791 г. [Second Turkish War in the reign of Empress Catherine II] (in Russian). Vol. I. St. Petersburg: Типография Р. Голике. pp. 92–108.
- Tsybakov, Dmitry Leonidovich (2022). "Проблемные вопросы истории Орловского пехотного полка: начало боевого пути и Кинбурнская оборонительная операция 1787 года". Вестник БГУ (3): 152.
