= Alexander Suvorov =

Russian military commander (1729/30–1800)

Generalissimo, Prince Alexander Suvorov Rymniksky
- Александр Васильевич Суворов
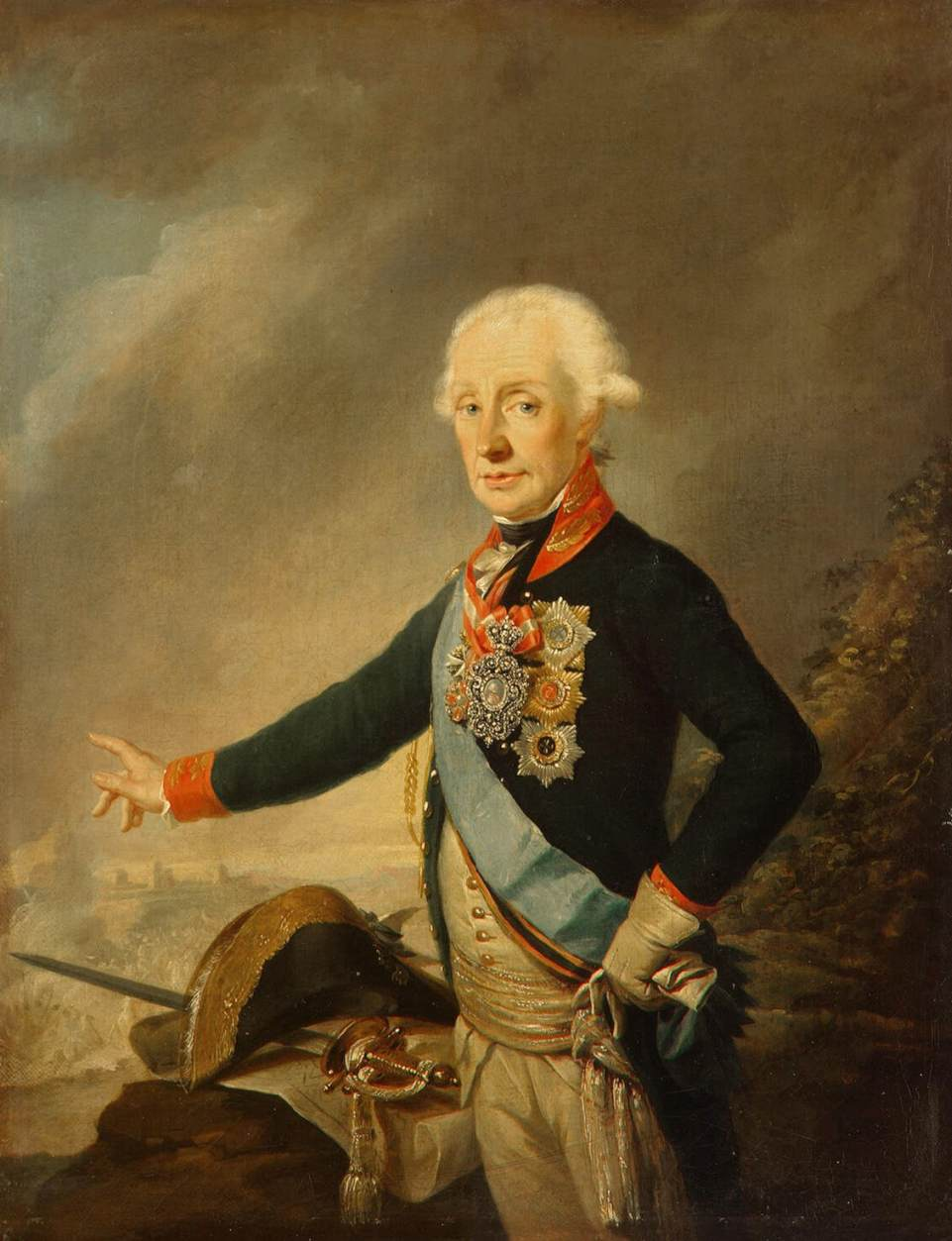
- Portrait by Joseph Kreutzinger, 1799
- Born: 24 November 1730; Moscow, Moscow Governorate, Russian Empire
- Died: 18 May 1800 (aged 69); St. Petersburg, Saint Petersburg Governorate, Russian Empire
- Burial place: Annunciation Church, Alexander Nevsky Lavra, St. Petersburg; 59.92093°N 30.38800°E
- Other name: Aleksandr Vasilevich Suvorov
- Education: First Cadet Corps
- Spouse: Varvara Suvorova (m. 1774)
- Children: Arkady Suvorov; Natalya Zubova
- Military career
- Allegiance: Russian Empire; Holy Roman Empire; Kingdom of Sardinia
- Branch: Imperial Russian Army; Imperial Austrian Army
- Service years: 1745–1800
- Rank: Generalissimus (Russian Empire); Feldmarschall (Holy Roman Empire)
- Nicknames: General Forward; Sword of Russia
- Commands: 11th Fanagoriysky Grenadier Regiment; Coalition Forces in Italy
- Conflicts: See: § Military record
- Awards: See: § Progeny and titles

Coat of arms of Count Suvorov-Rymniksky, Prince of Italy
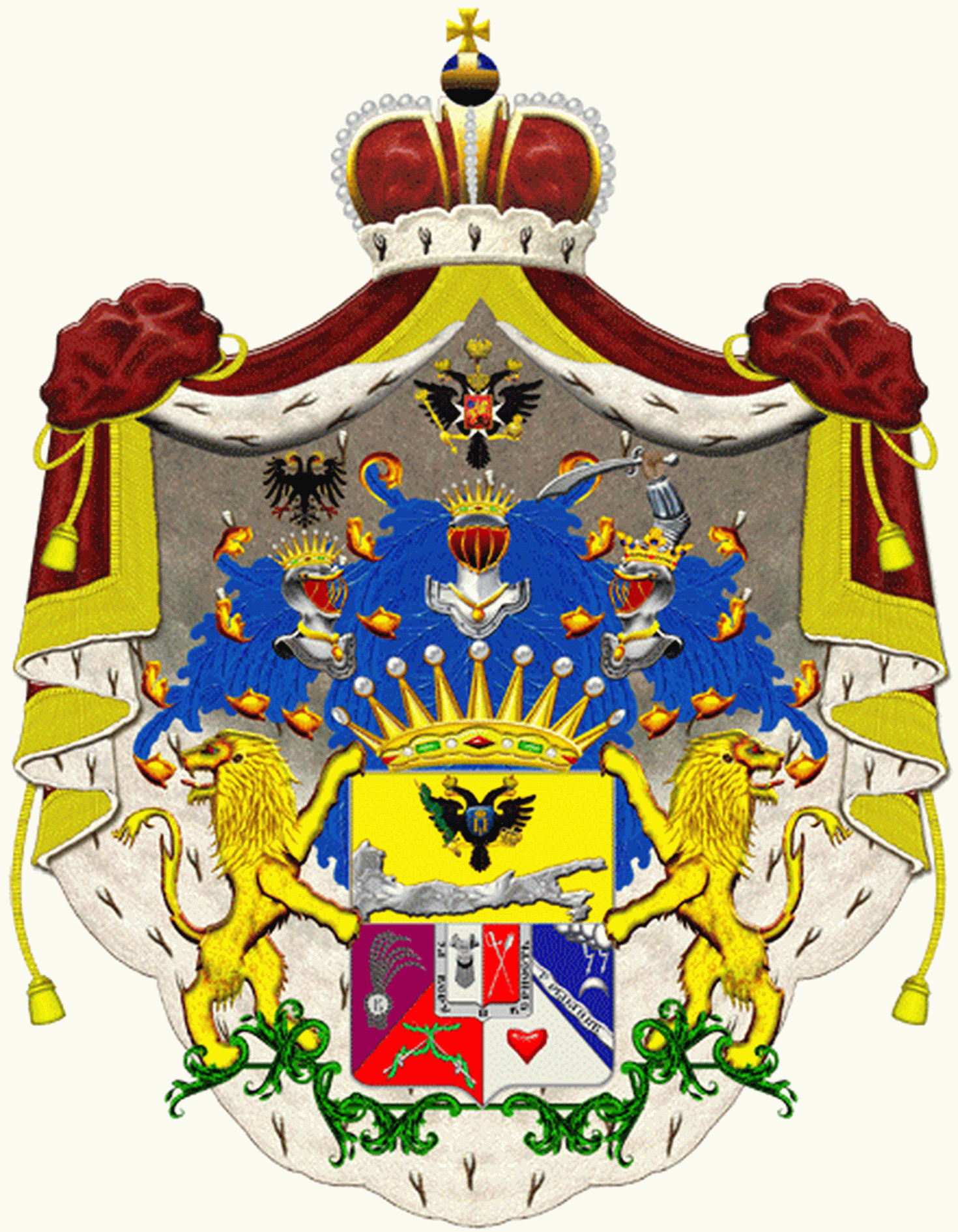

Selected military actions
Opponents:
Prussia Poland Turkey Crimea France

Count Alexander Vasilyevich Suvorov-Rymniksky, Prince of Italy (Note: Russian: Князь Итали́йский граф Алекса́ндр Васи́льевич Суво́ров-Ры́мникский, romanized: Knjazj Italijskij graf Aleksandr Vasiljevič Suvorov-Rymnikskij, IPA: [knʲæsʲ ɪtɐˈlʲijsʲkʲɪj graf ɐlʲɪkˈsandr vɐˈsʲilʲjɪvʲɪtɕ sʊˈvorəf ˈrɨmnʲɪksʲkʲɪj]) (Note: The Prince of Italy is the anglicised victory title of "Knyaz Italiysky". In Russian language, Italiysky comes from the Latin and Italian word Italia and is equivalent to the English word Italic.) (24 November [O.S. 13 November] 1729 or 1730 – 18 May [O.S. 6 May] 1800) was a Russian general and military theorist in the service of the Russian Empire.

Born in Moscow, he studied military history as a young boy and joined the Imperial Russian Army at the age of 17. Promoted to colonel in 1762 for his successes during the Seven Years' War, his victories during the War of the Bar Confederation included the capture of Kraków and victories at Orzechowo, Lanckorona, and Stołowicze. His reputation rose further when, in the Russo-Turkish War of 1768–1774, he captured Turtukaya twice and won a decisive victory at Kozludzha. After a period of little progress, he was promoted to general and led Russian forces in the Russo-Turkish War of 1787–1792, participating in the siege of Ochakov, as well as victories at Kinburn and Focșani.

Suvorov won a decisive victory at the Battle of Rymnik, and afterwards decisively defeated the Ottomans in the storming of Izmail. His victories at Focșani and Rymnik established him as the most brilliant general in Russia, if not in all of Europe. In 1794, he put down the Polish uprising, defeating them at the battle of Praga and elsewhere. After Catherine the Great died in 1796, her successor Paul I often quarrelled with Suvorov. After a period of ill-favour, Suvorov was recalled to a field marshal position at the outbreak of the French Revolutionary Wars. He was given command of the Austro-Russian army, and after a series of victories, such as the battle of the Trebbia, he captured Milan and Turin, and nearly erased all of Napoleon's Italian conquests of 1796–97. After an Austro-Russian army was defeated in Switzerland, Suvorov, ordered to reinforce them, was cut off by André Masséna and later surrounded in the Swiss Alps. Suvorov's successful extraction of the exhausted, ill-supplied, and heavily-outnumbered Russian army was rewarded by a promotion to generalissimo (Russian: генералиссимус, romanized: generalissimus). The most prominent battle was in the Muottental. According to one statement, Masséna himself would later confess that he would exchange all of his victories for Suvorov's passage of the Alps; as per another, Masséna said that he would never forgive him for the crossing accomplished by him in Switzerland. Suvorov died in 1800 of illness in Saint Petersburg. He was instrumental in expanding the Russian Empire, as his success ensured Russia's conquering of Kuban, Crimea, and New Russia.

He was one of the foremost generals in all of military history, and considered the greatest military commander in Russian history. Undefeated in major engagements, he has been described as the best general Republican France ever fought against, and noted as "one of those rare generals who were consistently successful despite suffering from considerable disadvantages and lack of support and resources." Suvorov was also admired by his soldiers throughout his whole military life, and was respected for his honest service and truthfulness.

== Early life ==
=== Origins ===
Alexander Suvorov was born into a noble family originating from Novgorod at the Moscow mansion in Arbat, given as dowry from his maternal grandfather, Fedosey Manukov. His father, Vasily Ivanovich Suvorov, was a general-in-chief and a senator in the Governing Senate, and was credited with translating Vauban's works into Russian.

His mother, Avdotya Fedoseyevna (née Manukova), was the daughter of judge Fedosey Manukov, and is considered an ethnic Russian. However, the name Manuk or Manukyan points to an Armenian origin, and likely a russified Armenian root. According to a family legend his paternal ancestor named Suvor had emigrated from Karelia, at the time ruled by the Swedish Empire, with his family in 1622 and enlisted at the Russian service to serve Tsar Michael Feodorovich (his descendants became Suvorovs). Suvorov himself narrated for the record the historical account of his family to his aide, colonel Anthing, telling particularly that his Swedish-born ancestor was of noble descent, having engaged under the Russian banner in the wars against the Tatars and Poles. These exploits were rewarded by Tsars with lands and peasants. This version, however, was questioned recently by prominent Russian linguists, professors Nikolay Baskakov and Alexandra Superanskaya, who pointed out that the word Suvorov more likely comes from the ancient Russian male name Suvor based on the adjective suvory, an equivalent of surovy, which means "severe" in Russian. Baskakov also pointed to the fact that the Suvorovs' family coat of arms lacks any Swedish symbols, implying its Russian origins.

Among the first of those who pointed to the Russian origin of the name were Empress Catherine II, who noted in a letter to Johann von Zimmerman in 1790: "It is beyond doubt that the name of the Suvorovs has long been noble, is Russian from time immemorial and resides in Russia", and Count Semyon Vorontsov in 1811, a person familiar with the Suvorovs. Their views were supported by later historians: it was estimated that by 1699 there were at least 19 Russian landlord families of the same name in Russia, not counting their namesakes of lower status, and they all could not descend from a single foreigner who arrived only in 1622.

Moreover, genealogy studies indicated a Russian landowner named Suvor mentioned under the year 1498, whereas documents of the 16th century mention Vasily and Savely Suvorovs, with the last of them being a proven ancestor of General Alexander Suvorov. The Swedish version of Suvorov's genealogy had been debunked in the Genealogical collection of Russian noble families by V. Rummel and V. Golubtsov (1887) tracing Suvorov's ancestors from the 17th-century Tver gentry. In 1756 Alexander Suvorov's first cousin, Sergey Ivanovich Suvorov, in his statement of background (skazka) for his son said that he did not have any proof of nobility; he started his genealogy from his great-grandfather, Grigory Ivanovich Suvorov, who served as a dvorovy boyar scion at Kashin.

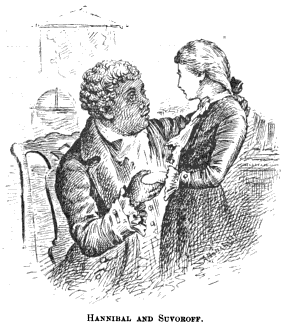
Suvorov speaking with General Gannibal. Spalding

=== Childhood ===
As a boy, Suvorov was a sickly child and his father assumed he would work in civil service as an adult. However, he proved to be an excellent learner, avidly studying mathematics, literature, philosophy, and geography, learning to read French, German, Polish, and Italian, and with his father's vast library devoted himself to intense study of military history, strategy, tactics, and several military authors including Plutarch, Quintus Curtius, Cornelius Nepos, Julius Caesar, and Charles XII. This also helped him develop a good understanding of engineering, siege warfare, artillery, and fortification. His father, however, insisted that he was unfit for military affairs. However, when Alexander was young, General Gannibal asked to speak to the child, and was so impressed with the boy that he persuaded the father to allow him to pursue the career of his choice.

== Early career ==
=== First military experience ===
Suvorov entered the military in 1745 and served in the Semyonovsky Lifeguard Regiment for nine years. During this period he continued his studies attending classes at Cadet Corps of Land Forces. He spent most of his time in the barracks: the troops loved him, though everyone considered him eccentric. Besides, he was sent with diplomatic dispatches to Dresden and Vienna; to carry out these assignments on 16 March 1752, he received a diplomatic courier passport, signed by the Chancellor Count Alexey Bestuzhev-Ryumin. From 1756 to 1758 Alexander next worked on the College of War; from 1758 he was engaged in forming reserve units, and was commandant of Memel. Suvorov gained his first battle experience fighting against the Prussians during the Seven Years' and the Third Silesian wars (1756–1763). (Note: The term Third Silesian War is a narrow concept of the Seven Years' War: the place of action is limited to Europe. Swedish historiography also uses the term Pomeranian War, which is confined only in Pomerania.) His first skirmish occurred on 25 July 1759 under Crossen, when Suvorov with a cavalry squadron attacked and routed Prussian dragoons;—he was serving in General-Major Mikhail Volkonsky's brigade. The following month Suvorov participated in the complete victory over Frederick the Great at the battle of Kunersdorf, after which the so-called Miracle of the House of Brandenburg happened.

At the time when Pyotr Semyonovich Saltykov, upon his Kunersdorf victory, remained unmoved and did not even send Cossacks to pursue the fleeing enemy, Suvorov said to William Fermor: "if I were commander-in-chief, I would go to Berlin right now". Fortunately for Frederick, he did not face Suvorov.

=== 1761 ===
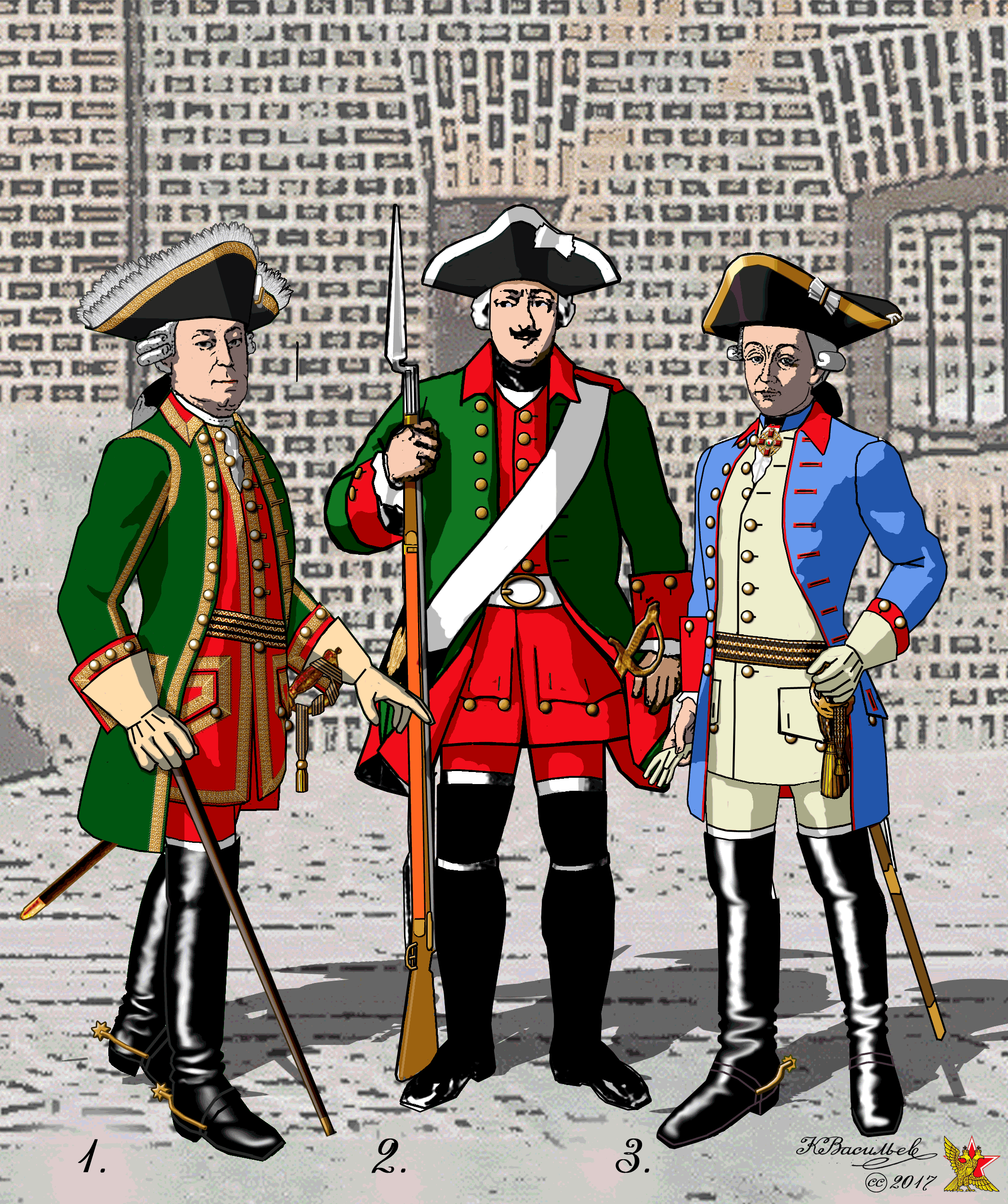
Imperial Russian Army in the Seven Years' War. Königsberg. Uniform: 1. General of the Infantry (Vasily Ivanovich Suvorov); 2. Musketeer of an infantry regiment; 3. Staff officer of a dragoon regiment (Alexander Vasilyevich Suvorov).; Kirill S. Vasilyev

Then, Alexander served under the command of General-Major Maxim Berg. Suvorov successfully defended his positions at Reichenbach, but contrary to his future rules did not pursue the retreating enemy, if the only surviving account of this action is accurate. At the skirmish of Schweidnitz, in a third assault, Suvorov managed to take the hill occupied by the hussar picket; in this clash 60 Cossacks opposed 100 hussars. For another example, in the combat of Landsberg on 15 September 1761, his Cossack-hussar cavalry unit defeated 3 squadrons of the Prussian hussars. On leaving the Friedberg Forest, he hit General Platen's side units and took many prisoners. He also fought minor battles at Bunzelwitz, Birstein, Weisentine, (Note: Weisentin?) Költsch, and seized the small fortified town of Golnau. After repeatedly distinguishing himself in battle Suvorov will become a colonel in 1762, aged around 33. Soon afterwards, following the capture of Golnau, he was given temporary command of the Tver Dragoon Regiment until the regimental commander recovered. Prussian observation detachments had spread far from Kolberg; Berg moved there in two columns, the left he led himself, and the right, which consisted of three Hussar, two Cossack, and Tver Dragoon regiments, he entrusted to Suvorov. In the village of Naugard (Note: Neugarten? / Neigarten?) the Prussians positioned themselves with 2 battalions of infantry and a weak dragoon regiment. Forming his unit in two lines, Suvorov began the attack. He felled the dragoons, struck one of the battalions, killed many on the spot and took at least a hundred prisoners. At Stargard, Suvorov attacked the rearguard of Platen, during which Suvorov cut into the enemy cavalry and infantry, and it was reported that "many were taken and beaten from the enemy". Suvorov managed to avoid heavy losses. All the battles described took place at the same time as the siege of Kolberg (1761) in Pomerania.

=== Freemasonry, Berlin ===
It is stated that Suvorov visited Prussian Masonic lodge. But it is doubtful that he himself was ever a Freemason. Just before his career in 1761, he took part in the raid on Berlin by Zakhar Chernyshev's forces (one year after the Kunersdorf). Suvorov took in a young boy, took care of him during the whole campaign, and on arrival at the quarters sent to the widow, the boy's mother, a letter reading:

"Dear mother, your little son is safe with me. If you want to leave him with me, he will not lack anything and I will take care of him as if he were my own son. If you wish to keep him with you, you can take him from here or write me where to send him."

== Wars against Poland–Lithuania ==
=== Dissolution of the Bar Confederation (1768–1772) ===
==== Outbreak of war and setbacks ====
Suvorov next served in Poland during the Confederation of Bar. Leading a unit of the army of Ivan Ivanovich Weymarn, he dispersed the Polish forces under Pułaski at Orzechowo, captured Kraków (1768), overthrew the Poles of Moszyński near Nawodzice in the spring of 1770, before defeating Moszyński's Polish troops at Opatów in July. The following year Alexander Suvorov won a small combat with Charles Dumouriez's army at Lanckorona, but he failed in the storming of the Lanckorona Castle, being injured here; and then on 20 May 1771, he unsuccessfully stormed the mountain near Tyniec Abbey, which included a strong redoubt enclosed by a palisade, trous de loup, and strengthened with two guns. The Russians under Suvorov and Lieutenant Colonel Shepelev captured the fortification twice, but were beaten back. Fearing to lose a lot of troops and time, Suvorov retreated. It was among the few tactical setbacks in his career, however, these were not field engagements.

Slightly earlier than at Tyniec, however, Suvorov had won small victories over the Confederates at Rachów and Kraśnik (27 & 28 February 1771), capturing an entire wagon train in the first of these clashes. By a "happy coincidence", Suvorov survived in it. After their failure at the Lanckorona Castle, Suzdalian infantrymen, the victors at Orzechowo, restored their reputation in Suvorov's eyes, not only at Kraśnik but also in Rachów. He wrote to Weymarn:

The infantry acted with great subordination, and I made my peace with them.

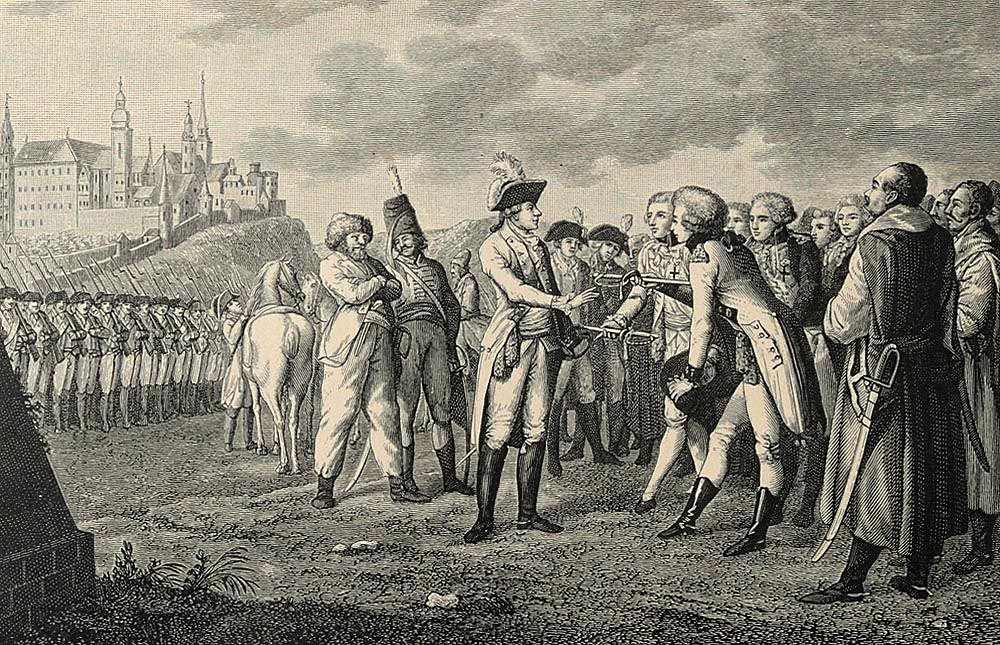
Surrender of the Wawel Royal Castle. French officers pass their swords to Alexander V. Suvorov; author I. D. Schubert

==== Retaliatory strike ====
Follow-up clashes rectify Suvorov's situation: the battle of Lanckorona one day after an incident at Tyniec, where Dumouriez, the future hero of the French Republic, was severely defeated; the combat of Zamość on 22 May 1771; the battle of Stołowicze; and the siege of the Wawel Castle (Kraków Castle), where the French and the szlachta, under the leadership of Brigadier Marquess Gabriel de Claude, made a sortie from the fortifications, and a force of Tyniec moved towards them – the Poles and their French allies were "defeated by brutal shooting and put to flight", paving the way for the first partition of Poland between Austria, Prussia and Russia. Suvorov meanwhile reached the rank of major-general.

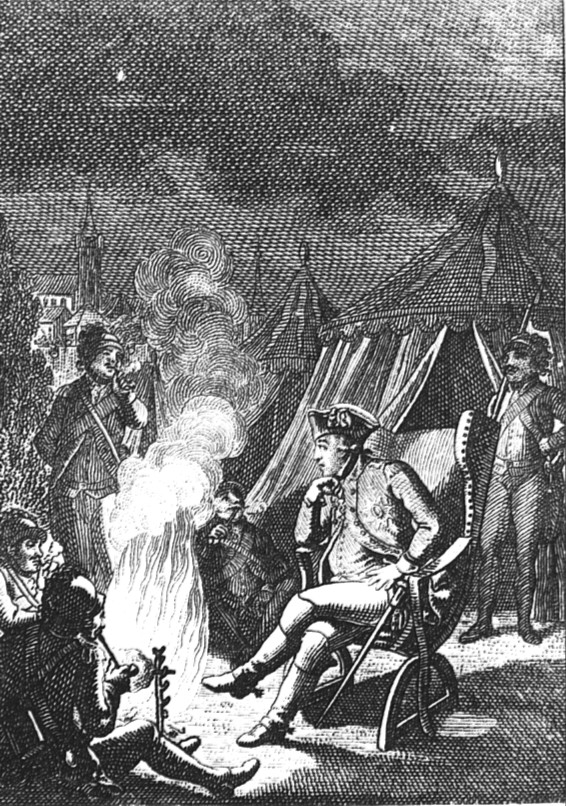
Suvorov near Praga; by Daniel Chodowiecki

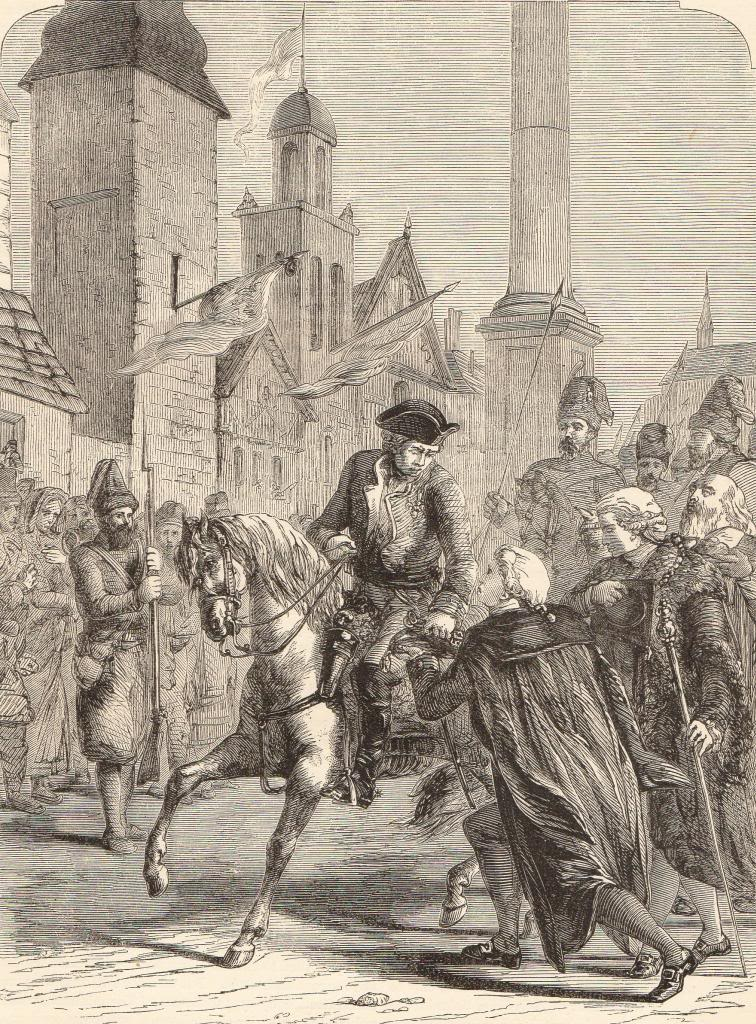
Suvorov entering Warsaw in 1794

=== Battles against Polish uprising (1794) ===
==== Turning victories ====
More than two years after the signing of the treaty of Iași (Jassy) with the Ottoman Empire, Suvorov was yet again transferred to Poland where he assumed the command of one of the corps and led the victorious battles of Dywin, Kobryń, Krupczyce, and the battle of Brest where he vanquished the forces of the Polish commander Karol Sierakowski; afterwards, Suvorov won the battle at Kobyłka. The cavalry attacks at Brest and Kobyłka resemble of Suvorov's offence at Lanckorona 22 years earlier, which ended in the defeat of Dumouriez. The battle showed that there was stability in his tactical rules, and he did not act on momentary impulse.

Suvorov was praised and exalted, anecdotes were told about him, his letters were quoted. It became known that he wrote a letter to Platon Zubov, in which, congratulating Zubov "with local victories," he proceeded: "I recommend to your favour my brothers and children, squires of the Great Catherine, who is so illustrious thanks to them". Suvorov sent to his daughter poems, where he described his working life:

The heavens have given us
Twenty-four hours.
I do not indulge my fate,
But sacrifice it to my Monarch,
And to end [die] suddenly,
I sleep and eat when at leisure.
Hello, Natasha and her household.

==== Triumph and tragedy in Praga ====
On 4 November 1794, Suvorov's forces stormed Warsaw, held by Józef Zajączek's troops, and captured Praga, one of its boroughs (a suburb or the so-called faubourg). The massacre of 12,000 (Note: Petrushevsky: "According to a Polish source, 8,000 Poles in arms and 12,000 Praga residents killed." Or up to 20,000. Only the killing of 20,000 Poles is indicated, without specifying civilians or Poles in arms.) civilians in Praga broke the spirits of the defenders and soon put an end to the Kościuszko Uprising. During the event, Russian forces looted and burned the entire borough. This carnage was committed by the troops in revenge for the slaughter of the Russian garrison in Warsaw during the Warsaw Uprising in April 1794, when up to 4,000 Russian soldiers died. According to some sources the massacre was the deed of Cossacks who were semi-independent and were not directly subordinate to Suvorov. Suvorov supposedly tried to stop the massacre and even went to the extent of ordering the destruction of the bridge to Warsaw over the Vistula River with the purpose of preventing the spread of violence to Warsaw from its suburb. Other historians dispute this, but most sources make no reference to Suvorov either deliberately encouraging or attempting to prevent the massacre. "I have shed rivers of blood," the troubled Suvorov confessed, "and this horrifies me". A total of 11,000 to 13,000 Poles were taken prisoner (approximately 450 officers), including captured with weapons, unarmed and wounded. Of the men taken alive and wounded, more than 6,000 were sent home; up to 4,000 were sent to Kiev, – from the regular army, without the scythemen, who were set at liberty with other non-military men.

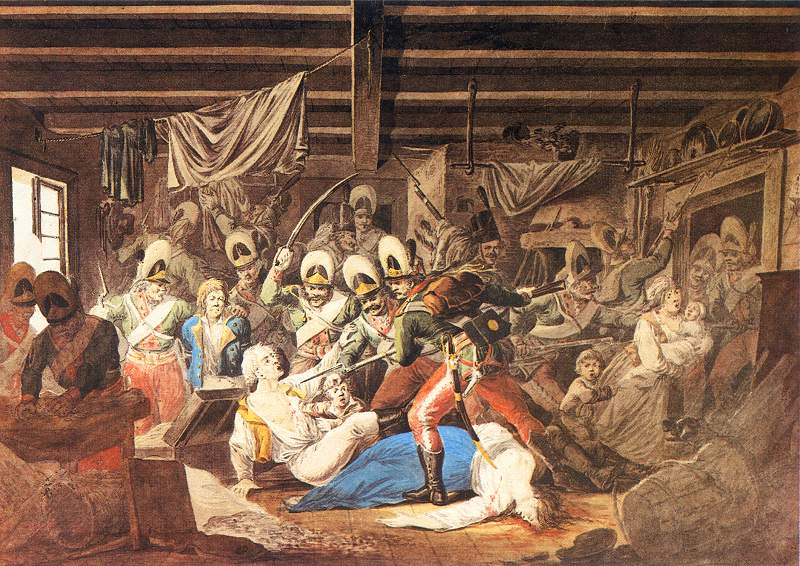
Massacre of Praga, uncontrolled by Suvorov. It is considered a personal revenge of the enraged Russian soldiers for Warsaw Uprising events. Aleksander Orłowski

Many writers call the storming of Praga a simple slaughterhouse. As historian Alexander Petrushevsky notes, Suvorov's dispositions of the troops were characterised by remarkable thoroughness; such was that of Praga according to Petrushevsky. "It is homogeneous with the Izmailian at its core and identical to it in many basic details. Both show a remarkable military calculation, which includes not only figures, but knowledge of the enemy's character, properties and general strength, a correct estimation of their own resources, moral and material, and a choice of means based on these data. But even more than the plan (the storming programme), what is striking is its execution, in which some features of the plan turned out to be additional steps to the Russian victory. Only troops who are perfectly trained and between whom and their leader there is complete harmony can act in this way".

==== Culmination, impact of campaign ====
Despite early successes on a battlefield, the organizer of the uprising, Tadeusz Kościuszko, was captured by the Don Cossack general Fyodor P. Denisov at the battle of Maciejowice, where Kościuszko was defeated at the hand of Baron Fersen's larger forces. Suvorov's and other Russians' victories led to the third partition of Poland. He sent a report to his sovereign consisting of only three words:

"Hurrah, Warsaw's ours!" (Russian: Ура, Варшава наша!)

Catherine replied in two words:

"Hurrah, Field-Marshal!" (Russian: Ура, фельдмаршал! – that is, awarding him this rank)

The newly appointed field marshal remained in Poland until 1795, when he returned to Saint Petersburg. But his sovereign and friend Catherine died in 1796, and her son and successor Paul I dismissed the veteran in disgrace.

== Wars with the Ottoman Empire ==
=== 1st war against the Ottomans ===
==== Developments ====
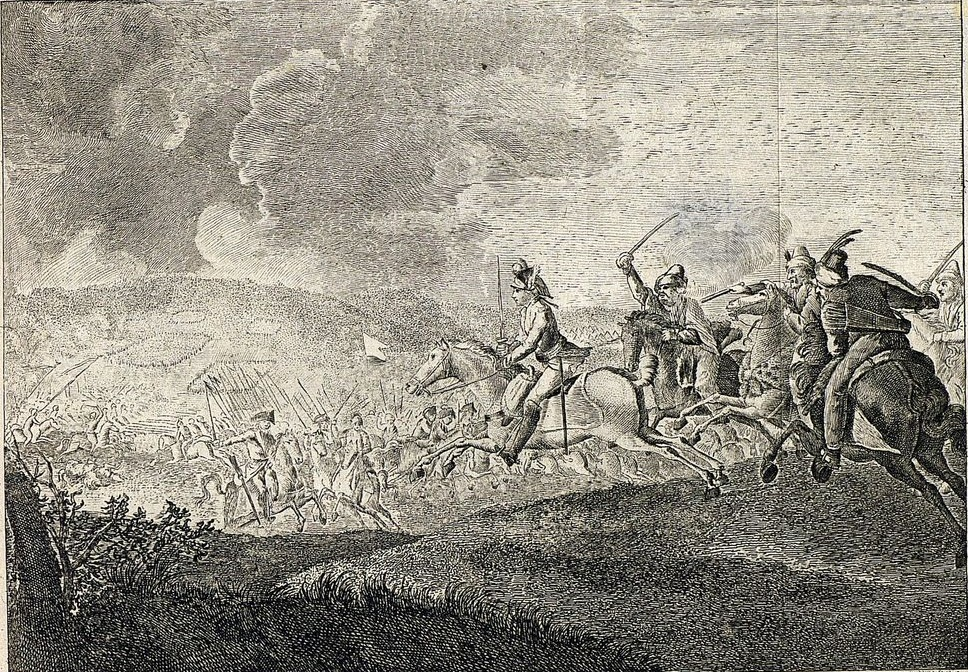
Battle of Kozludzha (now Suvorovo in memory of Suvorov's victory). Johann Friedrich Anthing

By this time period, the Ottoman Empire had become significantly weakened militarily and politically.

The Russo-Turkish War of 1768–1774 saw his first successful campaigns against the Turks between 1773 and 1774, and particularly in the battle of Kozludža (1774); Suvorov laid the foundations of his reputation there. During the same conflict, the Imperial Russian Navy triumphed over the Ottoman Navy at the battle of Cheshme, and Peter (Pyotr) Rumyantsev, likewise one of the most capable Russian commanders of the era as per statistician Gaston Bodart and historian K. Osipov, routed the Ottomans at the battle of Kagul. Petrushevsky states the following: "The battles of Larga, Chesma, and Kagul were balm for the Russian heart of Suvorov, but at the same time a vexation stirred up in him from the fact that he had not participated there. While in Poland, Suvorov's displeasure, inflated by his self-love and unsatisfied thirst for activity, was fed by news from the Turkish theatre of war. There was (or he thought there was) what he wanted, that "comfort" about which he wrote to Yakov Bulgakov in January 1771. Especially strong was to ignite in Suvorov is the desire to go to the main army after its glorious deeds of 1770". It was then that he had already started pushing for a transfer from Poland to Turkey.

His later earned victories against the Ottomans bolstered the morale of his soldiers who were usually outnumbered, such as the stormings of Turtukaya from 21 May to 28 June 1773, and the repelling of the assault on Hirsovo fortress with a subsequent counterattack on 14 September that year. In Suvorov's first reconnaissance to Turtukaya the troops pulled up to the tract of Oltenița, not far from the Danube, waiting for dawn. Suvorov stayed at the outposts, wrapped himself in a cloak and went to bed not far from the Danube shore. It was not yet daybreak when he heard loud shouts: "alla, alla"; jumping to his feet, he saw several Turkish horsemen, who with raised sabres were rushing towards him. He had barely time to jump on his horse and gallop away. Carabiniers were immediately sent to assist the attacked Cossacks, and those first-mentioned attacked the Turks in the flank, while they, having struck down the Cossacks, carried on to the heights. The Turks were repulsed, throwing themselves to the ships and hurriedly departed from the shore; there were only 900 of them, of whom 85 were killed, more were sunk; several men were taken prisoners, including the chief of the detachment. According to the testimony of the prisoners Suvorov managed to find out how many men were in the Turtukaya stronghold, and following its capture, even before sunrise, Suvorov wrote in pencil on a small piece of paper and sent to Lieutenant-General Count Ivan Saltykov, in whose division he served, the following short report: "Your Excellency, we have won; thank God, thank you". Suvorov also sent another report to the Commander-in-Chief Rumyantsev, consisting of couplets:

Glory to God, glory to you,
Turtukaya is taken and I am there too.

The war ended with the treaty of Küçük Kaynarca.

Suvorov's astuteness in war was uncanny and he also proved a self-willed subordinate who acted upon his own initiative. Rumyantsev's putting Suvorov on trial for his arbitrary reconnaissance of Turtukaya belongs to the realm of pure fiction. Rumyantsev was not dissatisfied with Suvorov, but with Ivan Saltykov. There was inactivity in Wallachia after Suvorov's initial capture of Turtukaya; Saltykov did not take advantage of the successful Turtukaya engagement despite the insistence of Rumyantsev; and Ottoman communications on the Danube became unimpeded. Lieutenant-General Mikhail Kamensky, with whose help Suvorov defeated the Turks at Kozludzha, not liking Suvorov, at the same time teased Ivan Saltykov with the mention of Alexander Vasilyevich. In one "decent, but rather unpleasant" letter to Saltykov, he amuses himself about the second Turtukaya victory of Suvorov and the inaction of Saltykov himself. Plus, a little earlier several reconnaissances had been made from Saltykov's division and one of them very unsuccessful. Colonel Prince Repnin was taken prisoner with 3 staff officers, more than 200 Russians were killed and missing, 2 ships, and 2 cannons were recaptured.

=== 2nd war against the Ottomans ===
==== Beginning ====
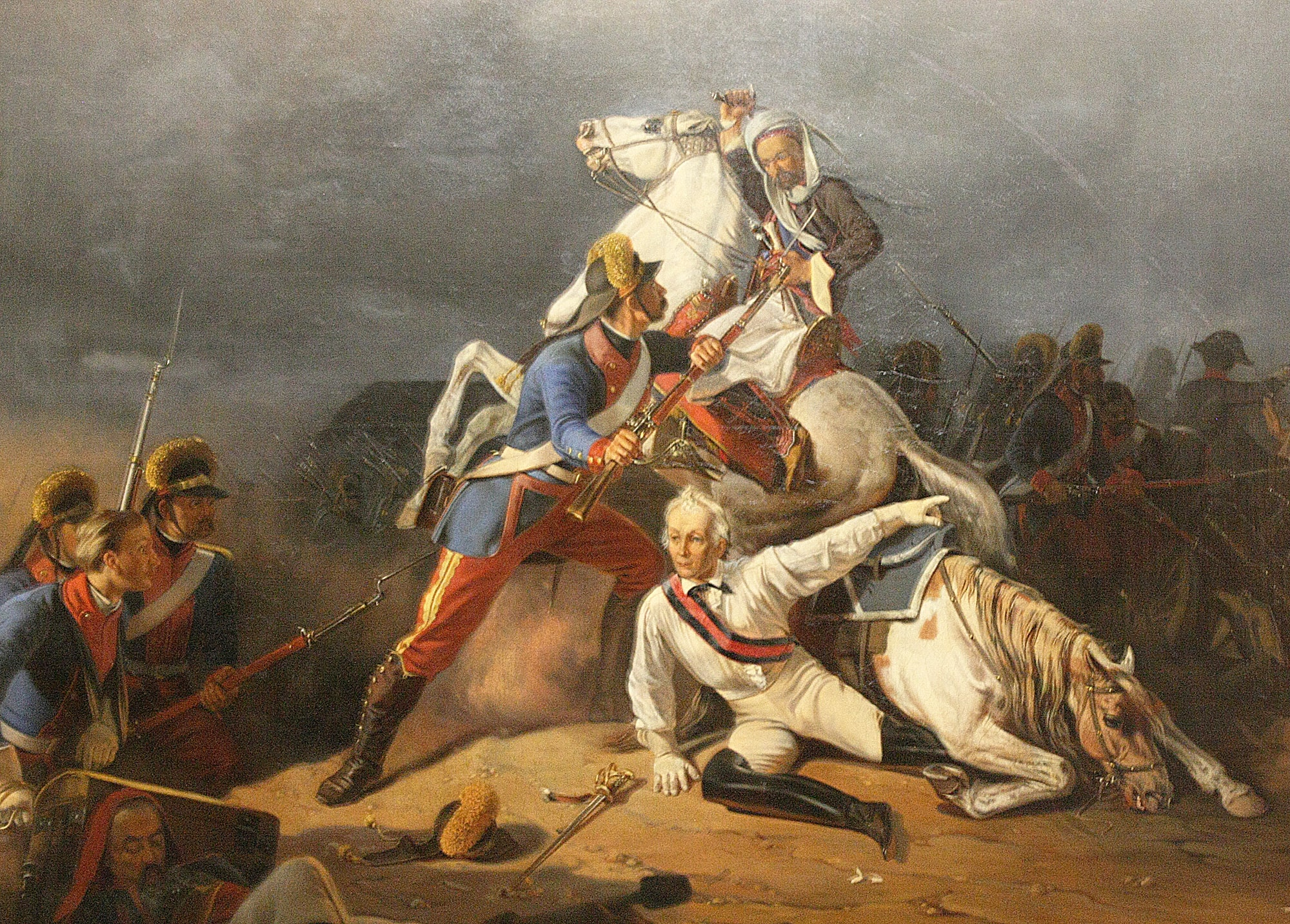
A wounded Suvorov saved by Grenadier Novikov at the Battle of Kinburn. From Generalissimo Prince Suvorov, composed by Alexander F. Petrushevsky M. M. Stasyulevich Press

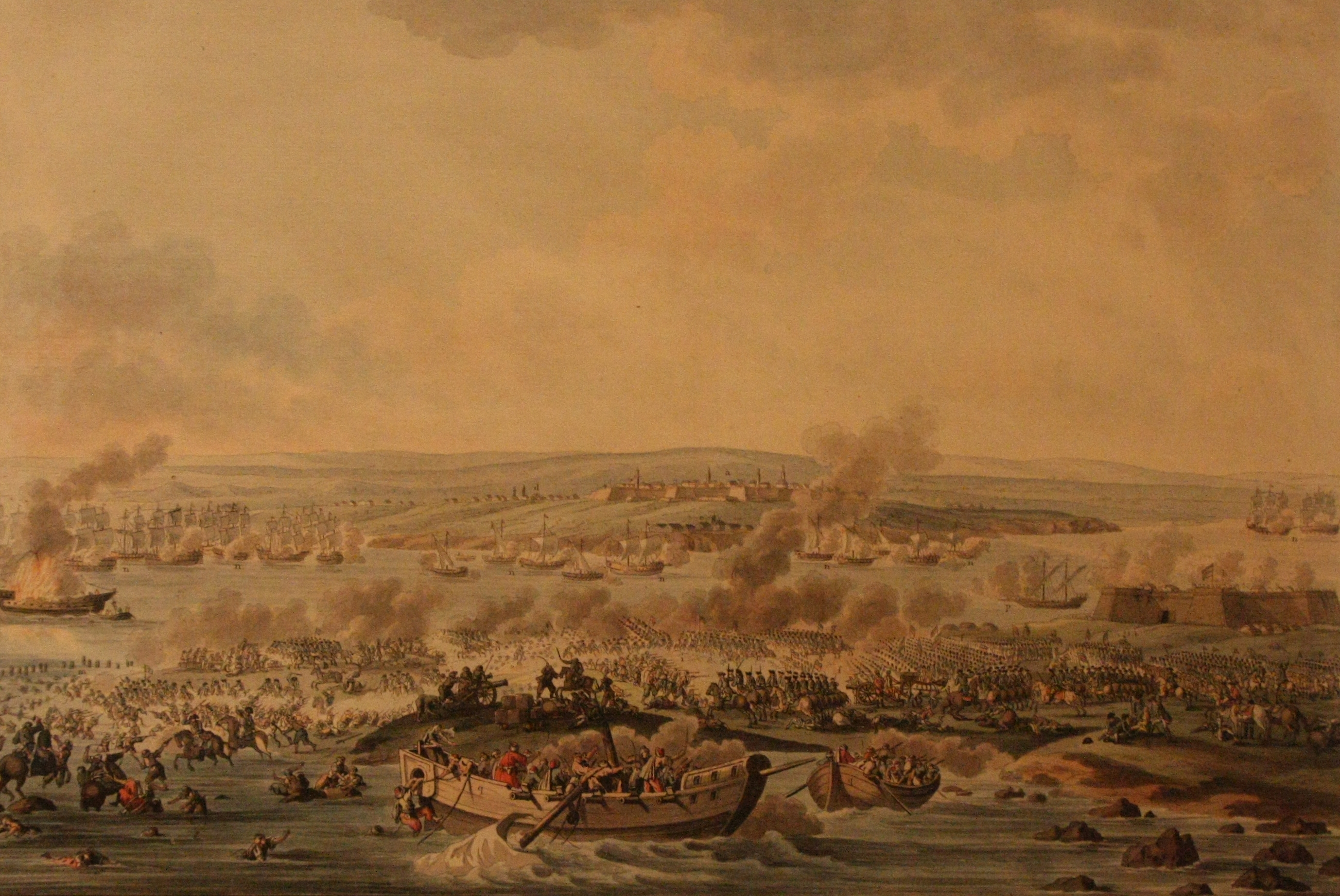
Struggle around the Kinburn Spit. Christian von Mechel

From 1787 to 1791, under the overall command of Grigory Alexandrovich Potemkin, he again fought the Turks during the Russo-Turkish War of 1787–1792 and won many victories; he was wounded twice at the hard-won Kinburn engagement (1787) and saved only thanks to the intervention of the grenadier Stepan Novikov. Novikov heard the call of his chief, threw himself at the Turks; he stabbed one, shot another and turned to the third, but that one fled, and with him the rest. The retreating Russian grenadiers noticed Suvorov, shouted: "Brothers, the general stayed in front!" and rushed again upon the Ottomans. The fight resumed, and the bewildered Turkish soldiers began again to rapidly lose one trench after another. Suvorov suffered greatly from grievous wounds and huge loss of blood; although he kept on his feet, he often fainted, and this went on for a month.

Suvorov was also soon involved in the costly siege of Ochakov (Özi). Energetic and courageous as usual, Alexander Suvorov proposed to take the fortress by storm, but Potemkin was cautious. "That's not how we beat the Poles and the Turks," Suvorov said in a close group of people; "one look will not take the fortress. If you had listened to me, Ochakov would have been in our hands long ago". The siege that took place was supported by a blockade of the Black Sea flotilla of Charles Henri de Nassau-Siegen under John Paul Jones, a renowned fighter for American independence. After a fierce naval combat, the Russian rowing vessels surrounded the flagship and took it; only Kapudan-ı Derya Hasan Pasha managed to escape. However, when great damage was done to the Ottoman fortress plus fleet, "as if inviting" the besiegers to storm, Potemkin still continued the siege, which Rumyantsev wryly called the siege of Troy, and Suvorov described in couplet that he was:

Sitting on a stone so cold,
Watching Ochakov as of old. (Note: In Edith Bone's translation of Osipov's book, the meaning is slightly changed for rhyme in English. In the original (Petrushevsky and Longworth include this as well) it reads: "I am sitting on a rock And at Ochakov I look.")

The mortality rate was extreme, from one cold 30–40 people a day: the soldiers were stiff in their dugouts, suffering terrible want of essentials, and so were the horses. During Potemkin's visit to the camp, the soldiers took the courage to personally ask him to storm, but this did not work. At last there was a deafening murmur among the whole army. Only having reached such a hopeless situation Potemkin decided to storm, setting it for 17 December, in which Suvorov did not participate due to a bullet wound that penetrated his neck and stopped at the back of his head. This happened during a successful Ottoman sortie from the fortress. (Note: The Russians lost 365 men in it, although Ottoman losses were greater.)

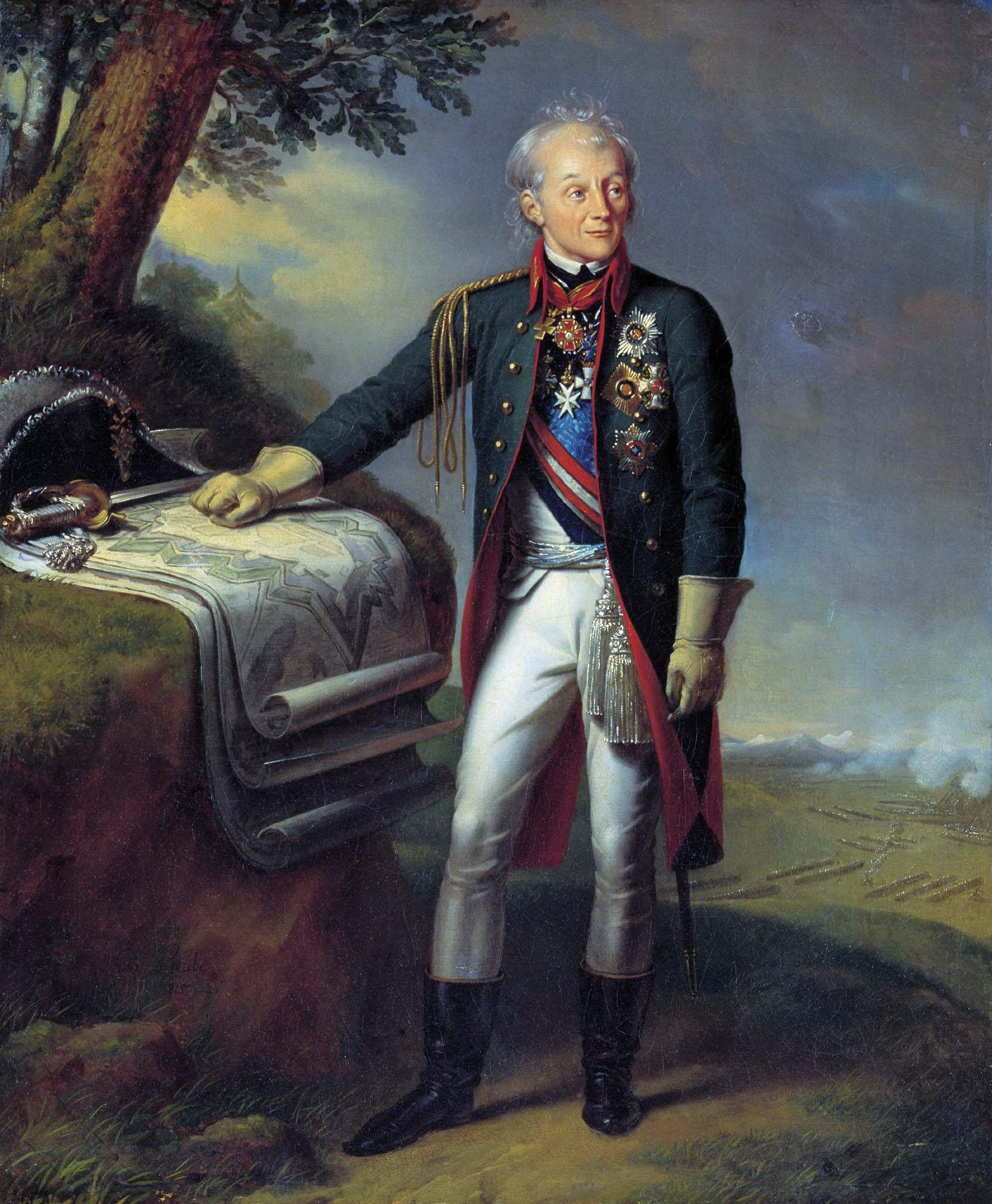
Alexander Suvorov by Charles de Steuben (1815)

==== The apex of military deeds ====
In 1789, after the joint Russian and Habsburg victorious battle of Focșani, he and the talented Austro-Bavarian general Josias of Coburg fought most decisive victories in their career. First at the battle of Rymnik, where, despite the vast inferiority in numbers (a Russian–Austrian force of 25,000 against 100,000 Turks), Suvorov persuaded the Austrian commander to attack; with the bold flanking maneuver of Suvorov and the resilience of the Austrians, together they routed the Ottoman army within a few hours, losing only 500 men in the process. Suvorov earned the nickname "General Forward" in the ranks of the Austrian corps for the latter victory; the word combination came to his attention and gave him sincere pleasure, as he later recalled this martial assessment of his person. Suvorov's 11th Fanagoriysky Grenadier Regiment was formed from soldiers who took part at Rymnik. Catherine the Great, in turn, made Suvorov a count with the name Rymniksky (or Rimniksky) as a victory title in addition to his own name, and the Emperor Joseph II made him a count of the Holy Roman Empire.

The second one came at the storming of Izmail in Bessarabia on 22 December 1790. On 20 December Suvorov convened a military council. Petrushevsky writes as follows: "Suvorov had nothing to consult about, but by doing so, he acted on the basis of the law and used this means to communicate his decision to others, to make his view their view, his conviction – their conviction." Petrushevsky further observes: "This is very difficult for ordinary commanders who do not tower over their subordinates in anything other than their position; but easy for such as Suvorov. There is no need for ranting, or intricately woven evidence; it is the winning authority that persuades, the unbending will that fascinates". Suvorov spoke a little in council and nevertheless brought everyone into raptures, he enthralled the very people who a few days ago considered the same assault unrealisable. The youngest of those present, Brigadier Platov, said the word assault, and the decision to assault was taken by all 13 persons without exception. The council determined:

"approaching Izmail, according to the disposition to storm it without delay, in order to give the enemy no time for further strengthening, and therefore there is no need for reference to his lordship the commander-in-chief [Grigory Potemkin]. Serasker's request is to be refused. The siege must not be turned into a blockade. Retreat is reprehensible to Her Imperial Majesty's victorious troops. By virtue of chapter fourteen of the military regulations."

Turkish forces inside the fortress had the orders to stand their ground to the end and haughtily declined the Russian ultimatum. Despite the fact that Mehmed Pasha was a resolute and firm commander, and inflicted serious losses on the Russians, his army was destroyed. Their defeat was seen as a major catastrophe in the Ottoman Empire, and in Russian military history there has never been a similar instantaneous storming of a fortress in terms of numbers and casualties as that of Izmail, much less without a proper siege. An unofficial Russian national anthem in the late 18th and early 19th centuries "Grom pobedy, razdavaysya!" ("Let the Thunder of Victory Rumble!"; by Gavrila Derzhavin and Józef Kozłowski) immortalized Suvorov's victory and 24 December is today commemorated as a Day of Military Honour in Russia. In this war Fyodor Ushakov also won many famous naval victories, as in the battle of Tendra, which deprived the Ottomans of Izmail's support from the Danube. Suvorov announced the capture of Ismail in 1791 to the Empress Catherine in a doggerel couplet.

The war ended with the treaty of Jassy.

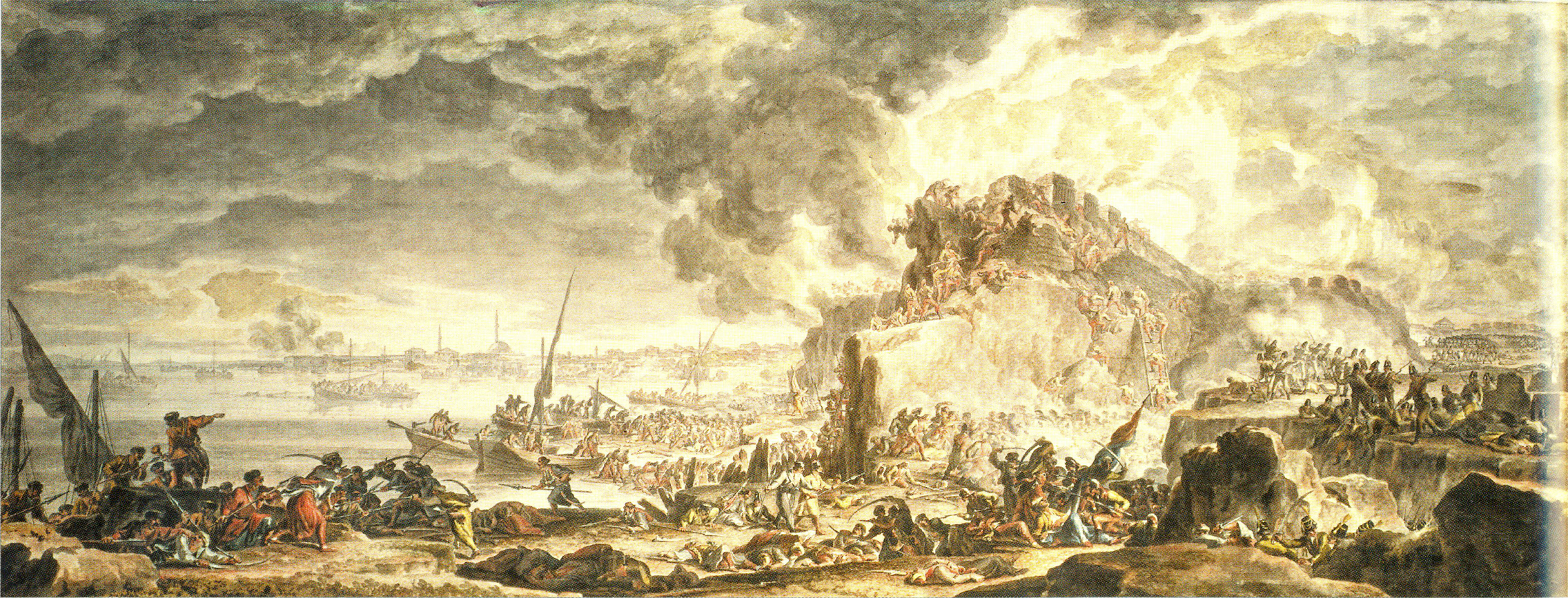
The capture of Izmail by Russian troops under the command of General-in-Chief A. V. Suvorov on 11 December 1791, Mikhail Ivanov

== Cossack Rebellion (1774) ==
From 1774 to 1797, Suvorov stayed and served in Russia itself, that is, in Transvolga or "Zavolzhye", in Astrakhan, Kremenchug, the Russian capital Saint Petersburg; in Crimea, or, more accurately, Little Tartary (Kuban which is in the North Caucasus, and Kherson); in the recently former Poland (Tulchin, Kobrin); and in the Vyborg Governorate, on the border with Swedish Finland.

=== In the footsteps of Pugachev ===
In 1774, Suvorov was dispatched to suppress Pugachev's Rebellion, whose leader Yemelyan Pugachev claimed to be the assassinated Tsar Peter III. Count Pyotr Panin, appointed for operations against Pugachev, asked to appoint a general to assist him, who could replace him in case of illness or death. On the very day of the news' arrival of Pugachev's passage to the right bank of the Volga, Rumyantsev sent orders – to send Suvorov to Moscow as soon as possible. Suvorov, who was in Moldavia, immediately rushed out at full speed, met in Moscow with his wife and father. On the order left by Panin, in one caftan and without luggage, raced to the village of Ukholovo, between Shatsk and Pereyaslavl Ryazansky. He arrived in Ukholovo on September 3 (NS), just at the time when Panin received notice of Alexander Vasilyevich's appointment. Panin gave him broad powers and ordered the military and civil authorities – to execute all Suvorov's orders.

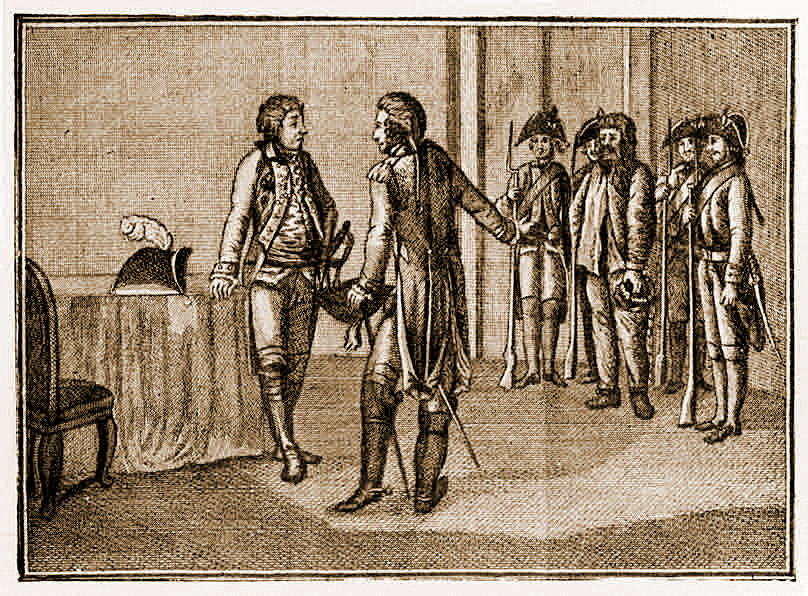
Colonel Ivan Yakovlevich Simonov, commandant of Yaitsk, transfers Y. I. Pugachev to A. V. Suvorov on September 16, 1774. By Christian Gottlieb Geyser.

After receiving instructions, Suvorov the same day set out on the road, in the direction of Arzamas and Penza to Saratov, with a small escort of 50 men. Panin reported to the Empress on the rapid performance of his new subordinate, which "promised in the circumstances of the time a lot of good ahead and therefore worthy of attention". Thanking him for such zeal and speed, the Empress granted him 2,000 chervonets to equip the crew. Reaching Saratov, Suvorov learned that tireless Ivan Mikhelson, who "like a shadow" followed everywhere after Pugachev and repeatedly defeated him, again defeated him badly. Strengthening his detachment here, Suvorov hurried to Tsaritsyn, but a lot of horses went to Pugachev, there was a lack of them, and Suvorov was forced to continue the journey by water. Defeated by Mikhelson, Pugachev slipped away; having somehow crossed the Volga with a small number of his loyalists, he disappeared into the vast steppe. Hasty arrival of Suvorov in Tsaritsyn drew the attention of the Empress, who announced her pleasure to Count Panin. But Suvorov was still essentially late. However, Suvorov did not stop it, he assigned to his detachment 2 squadrons, 2 Cossack sotnias, using horses captured by Mikhelson put on horseback 300 infantrymen, seized 2 light guns, and after spending less than a day on it all, crossed the Volga. Apparently, for reconnaissance on the rebels, he first moved upriver, came to a large village, which kept the Pugachev side, took 50 oxen, and then seeing that around the quiet, turned to the steppe. This vast steppe, which stretched for several hundred km., desolate, woodless, homeless, was a "dead desert, where even without the enemy's weapons was threatened with death". Suvorov had very little bread; he ordered to kill, salt and bake on fire some of the taken cattle and use the slices of meat for people instead of bread, as he did in the last campaign of the Seven Years' War. Thus secured for some time, Suvorov's detachment went deeper into the steppe. "They followed the sun by day and the stars by night; there were no roads, they followed the traces and moved as fast as they could, not paying attention to any atmospheric changes, because there was no place to hide from them". In different places Suvorov was overtaken and joined by several detachments, who went before him from Tsaritsyn; on 23 September, he came to the Maly Uzen River, divided his squad into four parts and went to the Bolshoy Uzen in different directions. Soon they stumbled on Pugachev's trail; they found out that Pugachev was here in the morning, that his men, seeing an unstoppable pursuit, lost faith in the success of their cause, revolted, tied Pugachev and took him to Yaitsk, to extradite the leader to save themselves. And indeed Pugachev was arrested, as it turned out later, at this time, some 53 km (33 mi) from Suvorov. Suvorov arrived at the scene only in time to conduct the first interrogation of the rebel leader, but Suvorov missed the chance to defeat him in battle, who had been betrayed by his fellow Cossacks and was eventually beheaded in Moscow.

== Kuban and Crimea ==
=== Kuban ===
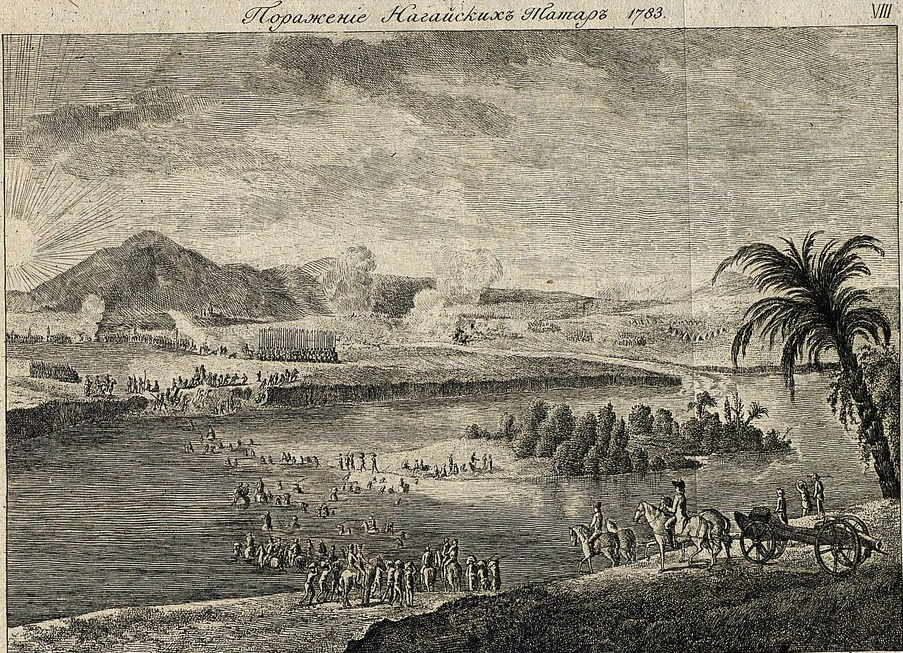
Suppression of the Nogai rebellion. Johann F. Anthing

As a result of the Russo-Turkish War of 1768–1774, the Crimean Khanate became independent of the Ottomans, but in fact became a Russian protectorate (1774 to 1783). The Russian-imposed Şahin Giray proved unpopular. The Kuban Nogais remained hostile to the Russian government. From the end of January 1777, Suvorov set about building new fortifications at Kuban, despite the severe cold and predator raids, suggesting that the entire cordon should be shortened, and that it should be connected to the Azov-Mozdok fortified line. There were only about 12,000 men under Suvorov's command. He explored the region, more than 30 fortifications were built, and the order of service at the cordon was changed. Attacks from across the Kuban ceased; Tatars, guarded against the unrest of Turkish Zakuban emissaries and from the raids of predators, were pacified, and began to make sure that the Russians really had good intentions towards them. But the peace was short-lived, however. "Intelligent Rumyantsev could not fail to appreciate the fruitful activities of Suvorov in Kuban" and spoke of him with pleasure and praise.

By 1781, the situation in the Crimean Khanate, especially in the North-West Caucasus, had "heated up to the limit". Dissatisfaction with the Khan and the withdrawal of Russian troops led to an uprising of the Kuban Nogais at the beginning of the year. By July 1782, the uprising had spread to Crimea. In September to October 1782, Suvorov was engaged in "restoring order" on the territory of north-west Caucasus. The first insurrection was suppressed by the force of returning Russian troops directly by Alexander Suvorov and Anton de Balmen at the end of 1782 (Balmen put down a rebellion on the Crimean Peninsula territory). In 1783, Suvorov with complete surprise for the rebels crossed the Kuban River and in the battle of the Laba on 1 October (near Kermenchik tract) decisively quelled the second Nogai uprising, which, in turn, was triggered by Catherine's manifesto, declaring Crimea, Taman, and Kuban as Russian possessions. At the Laba, Nogai losses amounted to 4,000.

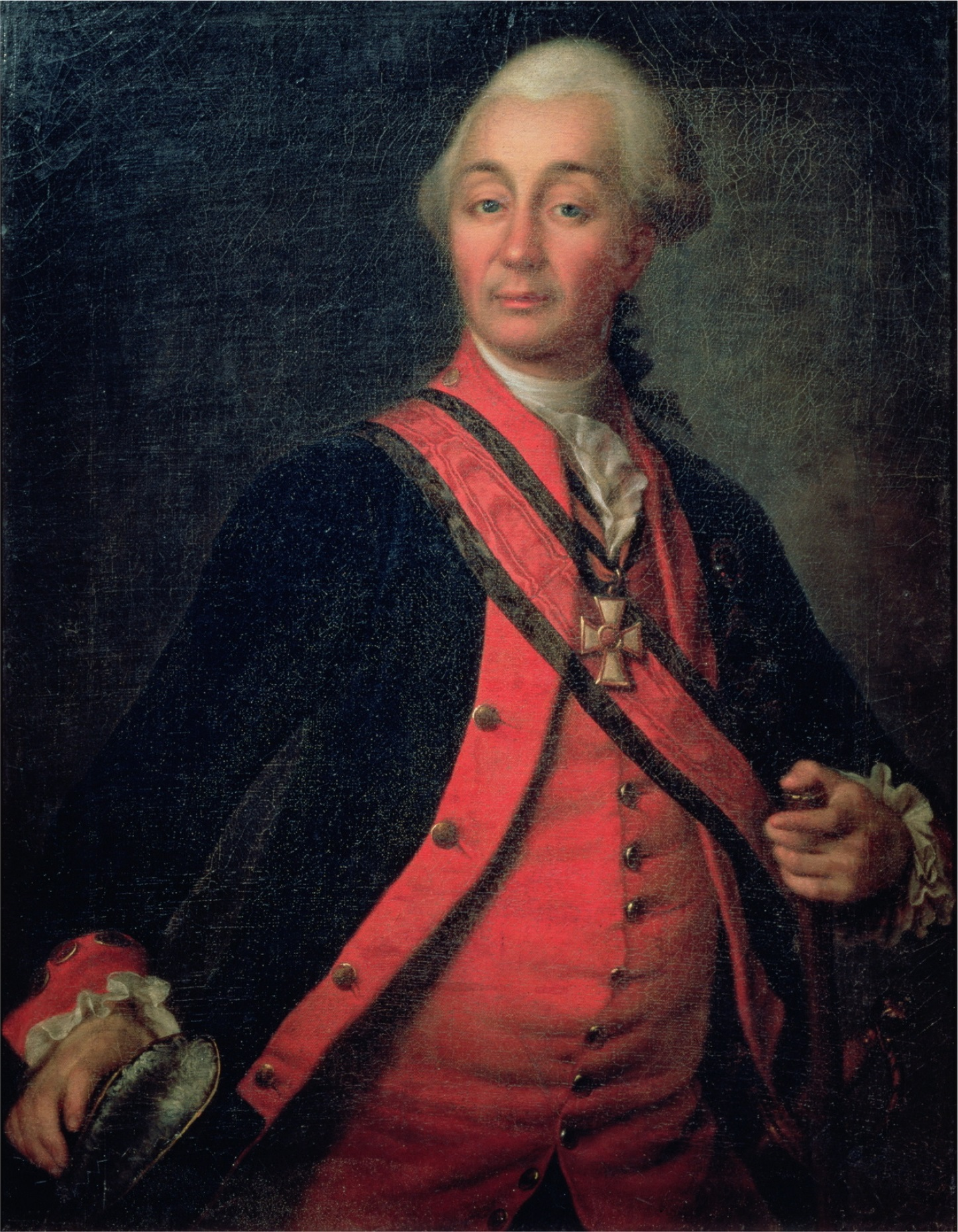
Suvorov, Alexander Vasilyevich (Aleksandr Vasilyevitch); 1786; by Dmitry Levitsky

=== Crimea (Little Tartary) ===
==== Christian resettlement ====
On behalf of Empress Catherine II, Suvorov participated in an incident – the forced resettlement of Christians from Crimea. The possession of Crimea did not seem secure for Russia at that time. Russia had to extract all it could from Crimea, and this was achieved by resettling Christians, mainly of Greek and Armenian nationalities, from Crimea: they had industry, horticulture and agriculture, which constituted a significant part of the Crimean Khan's income. The fact that the Crimean Christians were burdened "to the last degree" by the Khan's extortions and, therefore, the tax exemption granted to them in the new place should have inclined them in favor of the measure conceived by the Russian government, was in favor of the feasibility of resettlement. Thus the matter was resolved and Suvorov was entrusted with its execution. In the second half of September 1778 the resettlement ended. More than 31,000 souls were evicted; the Greeks were mostly settled between the rivers Berda and Kalmius, along the river Solyonaya and all the way to Azov; the Armenians near Rostov and generally on the Don. Rumyantsev reported to the Empress that "the withdrawal of the Christians can be regarded as a conquest of a noble province". 130,000 rubles were spent for transportation and food. Petrushevsky suggests that food itself cost very cheap, because Suvorov bought from the same Christians 50,000 quarters of bread, which, coming locally to the shops, cost half as much as delivered from Russia, what resulted in savings of 100,000 rubles. "Suvorov's orders were distinguished by remarkable and calculated prudence, he had put his heart into this business". More than half a year later, when the case was almost submitted to the archives, Suvorov still felt as if he had a moral obligation towards the settlers and wrote to Potemkin:

"The Crimean settlers suffer many shortcomings in their present state; look upon them with a merciful eye, who have sacrificed so much to the throne; relish their bitter remembrance."

After Suvorov organized the resettlement of Armenian migrants displaced from Crimea, Catherine gave them permission to establish a new city, named Nor Nakhichevan by the Armenians. In addition, Alexander Suvorov would later found the city of Tiraspol (1792), now the capital of Transnistria.

In 1778 Alexander as well prevented a Turkish landing on the Crimean Peninsula, thwarting another Russo-Turkish war. In 1780 he became a lieutenant-general and in 1783 – General of the Infantry, upon completion of his tour of duty in the Caucasus and Crimea.

==== Kherson ====
Going to Kherson (1792), Suvorov received quite a detailed instruction. He was entrusted with command over the troops in the Yekaterinoslav Governorate, Taurida Oblast and the territory newly annexed from Ottoman Turkey, with the responsibility to manage the fortification works there. Black Sea Fleet was under the command of Vice-Admiral Nikolay Mordvinov, and a rowing fleet under the command of General-Major Osip Deribas, who was dependent on Suvorov only for troops in the fleet. Suvorov was ordered to inspect the troops to ascertain their condition and replenish what was missing, to survey the coast and borders, and submit his opinion on bringing them to safety from accidental attack; he was also allowed to change the disposition of the troops without giving any reason for neighbors to think that the Russians were anxious; – finally, he was ordered to collect and submit notifications from abroad.

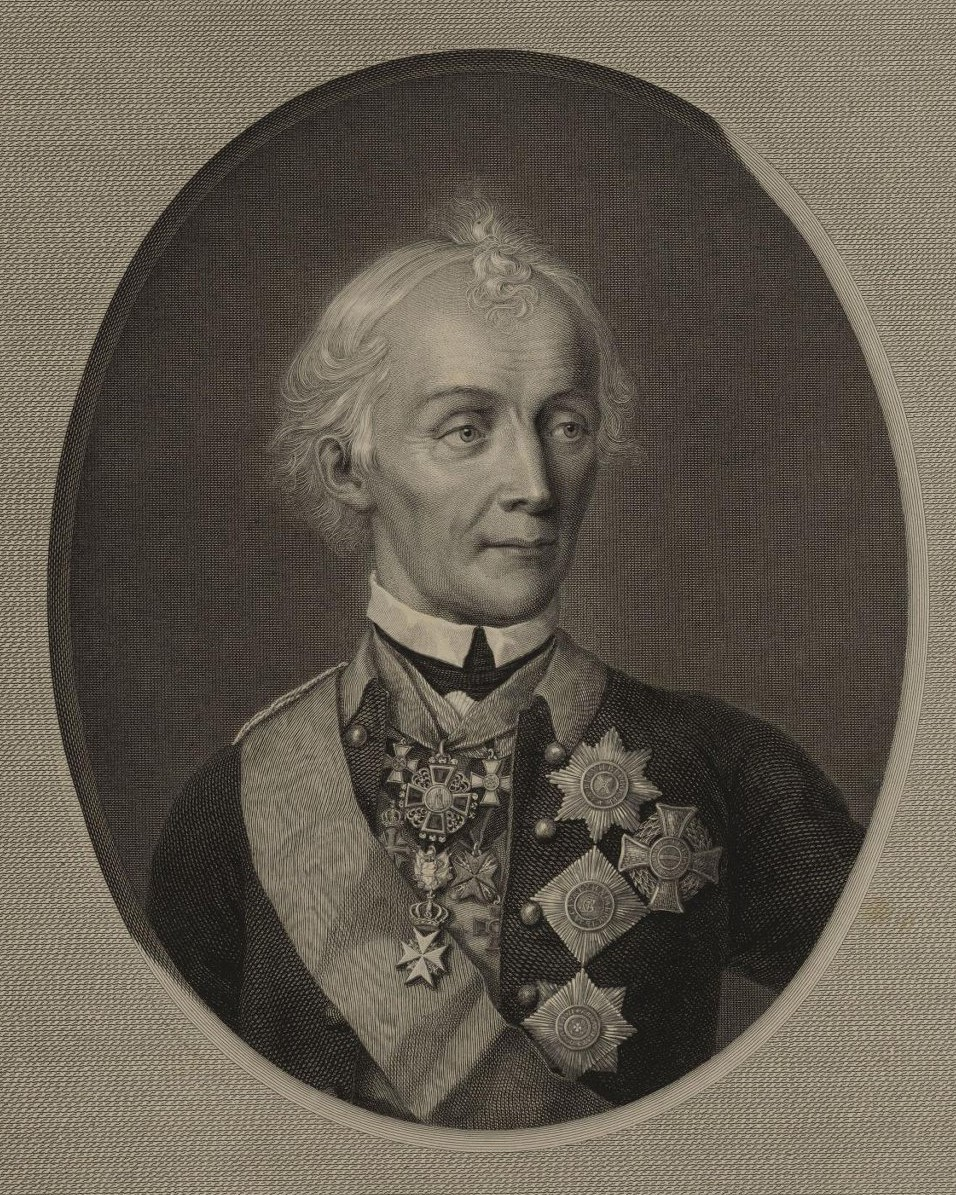
Russian commander Alexander V. Suvorov. Lithography, 1818. By Nikolai Utkin (the engraving after the pastel portrait of Alexander Suvorov by J.H. Schmidt, 1800)

Engineering occupied the most prominent place in Suvorov's activities in the south, as well as in Finland. The plans signed by him were preserved: the project of the Phanagoria fortress, three projects of fortifications of the Kinburn Spit and the Dnieper–Bug estuary, the plan of the Kinburn Fortress, the main logistics center of Tiraspol, the fort of Hacıdere (Ovidiopol) on the Dnieper–Bug estuary, Khadjibey (Odessa) and Sevastopol (Akhtiar) fortifications. Some of these were built during his time there and have progressed considerably, others had only just begun; there were also fortifications remained in the project due to short time and lack of money. At Sevastopol four forts were started, including 2 casemated; in Khadjibey was placed a military harbor with a merchant pier, according to François Sainte de Wollant's plans, under the direct supervision of Deribas and supreme surveillance of Suvorov.

==== Tulchin ====
In Tulchin he contributed to the training of troops (1796). On arriving in Tulchin, Suvorov first of all paid attention to the welfare of the soldiers. There were "huge numbers" dying, as in epidemic times, especially at work in the port of Odessa, where the annual percentage of deaths reached up to 1/4 of the entire staff of the troops, and one separate team died out almost entirely. The reason: "many generals were suppliers to the troops"; the builder of Odessa Deribas capitalised "terribly" on this. Against all the "evils" detected, Suvorov took immediate measures, akin to those of the previous ones, and watched their execution vigilantly. Barely two months have passed before the death rate in Odessa fell fourfold, and in some other places the percentage of deaths was closer to normal, and in August it was below normal.

== Finland (1791–1792) ==
A feast was held in Russia to commemorate glorious military exploits, especially the storming of Izmail. A few days before the feast, 6 May 1791, Suvorov received from Potemkin command of the Empress – to go around Finland to the Swedish border, to design a border fortifications (in the South-Eastern Finland fortification system). Suvorov went willingly, "just to get rid of his inactivity"; the region was familiar to him, as 17 years ago he had already traveled around the Swedish border, and although the present task seemed more difficult, but with his usual energy and diligence, Suvorov completed it in less than 4 weeks. The Empress treated with full approval of Suvorov's construction works.

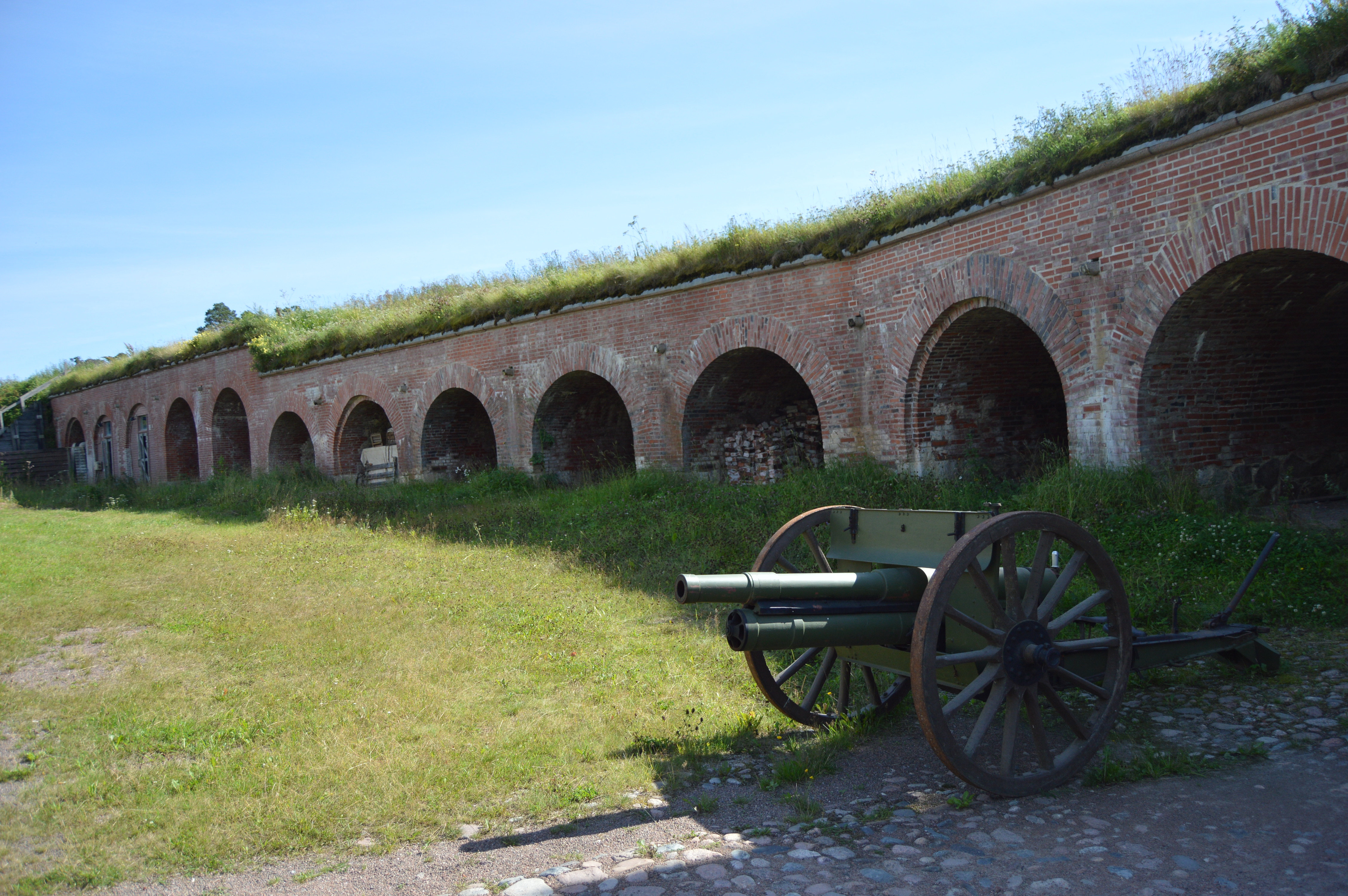
Suvorov founded the fortress of Kymmenegård

During the harsh Finnish spring, he traveled in sledges in the wild backwoods of the Russian–Swedish border, enduring hardships that "a military man of high position does not know even in wartime". Repeated the same old thing: Suvorov had already traveled in winter inclement weather, riding on a Cossack horse, without luggage, to Izmail.

Suvorov, besides building and repairing fortresses, had troops and a flotilla on his hands. The greater part of the rowing flotilla was in the skerries, the smaller on Lake Saimaa. At first the flotilla was commanded by Prince Nassau-Siegen, but in the summer of 1791, he absented himself from Catherine on the Rhine to offer his services to the French princes for the war against the Republicans. The flotilla was numbering upwards of 125 vessels of various names and sizes, with 850 guns; it was under the command of Counter-Admiral Marquess de Traversay and General-Major Hermann, subordinates to Suvorov. He was responsible for manning ships, for training people, for conducting naval exercises and maneuvers. Suvorov was never a nominal chief; he endeavoured to familiarise himself, as much as possible, with marine speciality. Some practical information he had acquired earlier, in the Dnieper–Bug estuary, where a flotilla was also under his command, and continued in Finland to look into naval affairs. On his first trip here he took private lessons, about which he wrote to Military Secretary Turchaninov; later, according to some reports, he jokingly asked to test himself in naval knowledge and passed the exam "quite satisfactorily".

Suvorov lived in different places in Finland, depending on the need: in Vyborg, Kymmenegård, Ruotsinsalmi. In Kymmenegård he left a memory of his concern for the Orthodox Church: he sent a church choir director from St. Petersburg to train local choristers, bought different church things for several hundred rubles. Here he formed a circle of acquaintances, free from service time spent fun; Suvorov often danced, and in a letter to Dmitry Khvostov bragged that once he "contradanced for three hours straight".

== Relations with Paul ==
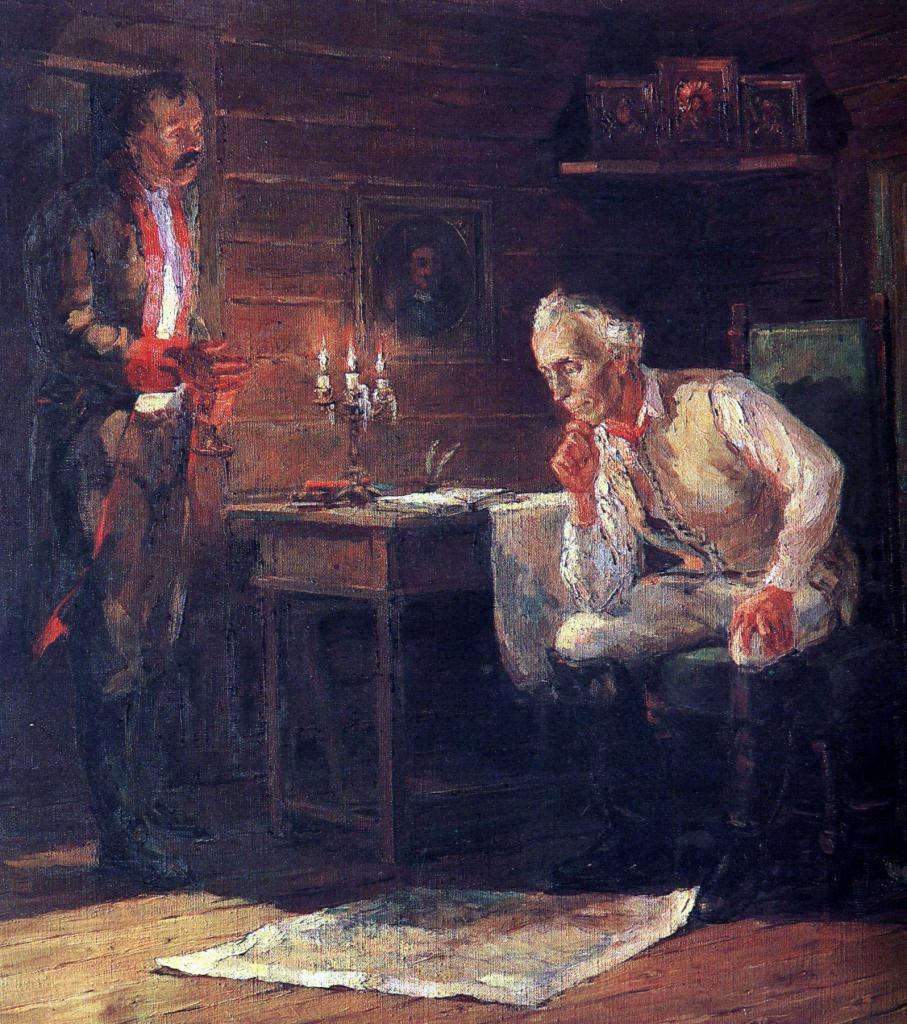
Alexander Suvorov in disgrace

Suvorov remained a close confidant of Catherine, but he had a negative relationship with her son and heir apparent Paul. "Paranoid" Paul even had his own regiment of Russian soldiers whom he dressed up in Prussian-style uniforms and paraded around. Suvorov was strongly opposed to these uniforms and had fought hard for Catherine to get rid of similar uniforms that were used by Russians up until 1784.

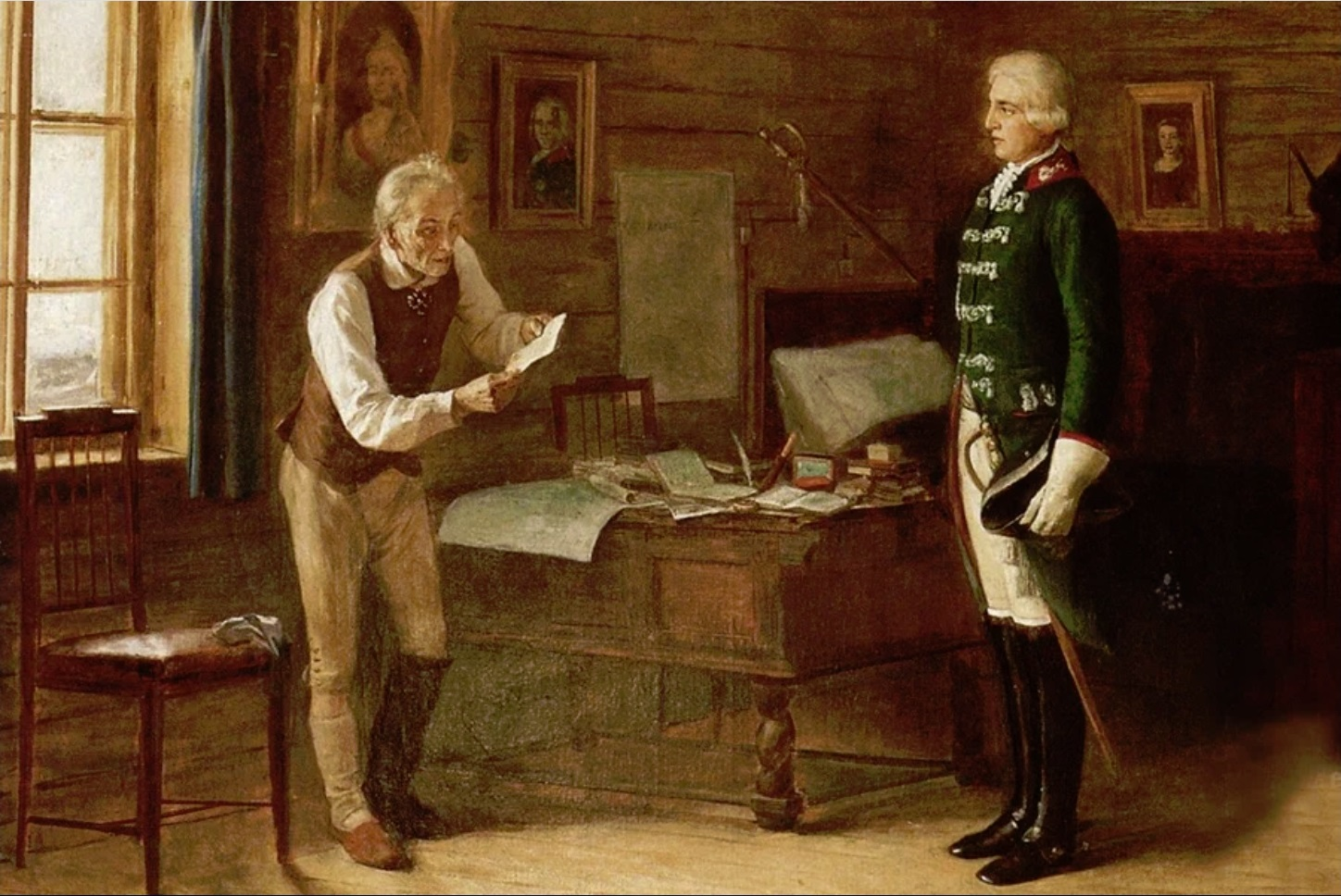
An exiled Suvorov receiving orders to lead the Russian Army against Napoleon. By P. Isaakovich Geller

When Catherine died of a stroke in 1796, Paul I was crowned Emperor and brought back these outdated uniforms instead of the comfortable clothing introduced by Potemkin. It is considered that in the same year the Golden Age of Russian nobility and of the Russian Empire came to an end, along with Catherine the Great. Suvorov was not happy with Paul's reforms and disregarded his orders to train new soldiers in the Prussian military manner (it also included severe punishments), which he considered cruel and useless. (Note: See Prussian Army) Paul was infuriated and dismissed Suvorov, exiling him to his estate Konchanskoye near Borovichi and kept under surveillance. His correspondence with his wife, who had remained at Moscow because their marriage was unhappy, was also tampered with. It is recorded that on Sundays he tolled the bell for church and sang among the rustics in the village choir. On weekdays he worked among them in a smock-frock.

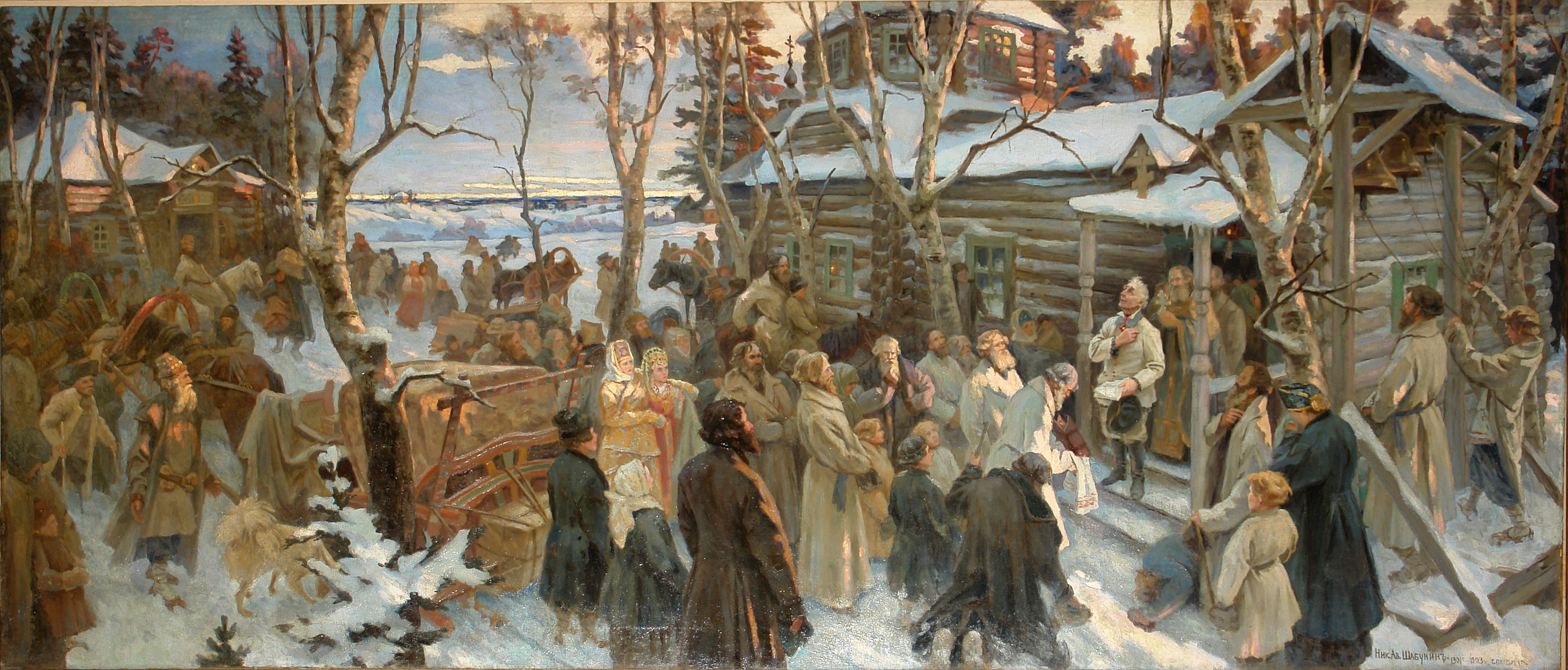
Suvorov's departure from the village of Konchanskoye for the 1799 campaign. Oil painting by Nikolay Shabunin. Suvorov Memorial Museum

== Italian and Swiss expedition of 1799 ==
=== Italian campaign ===
==== General coverage of events ====
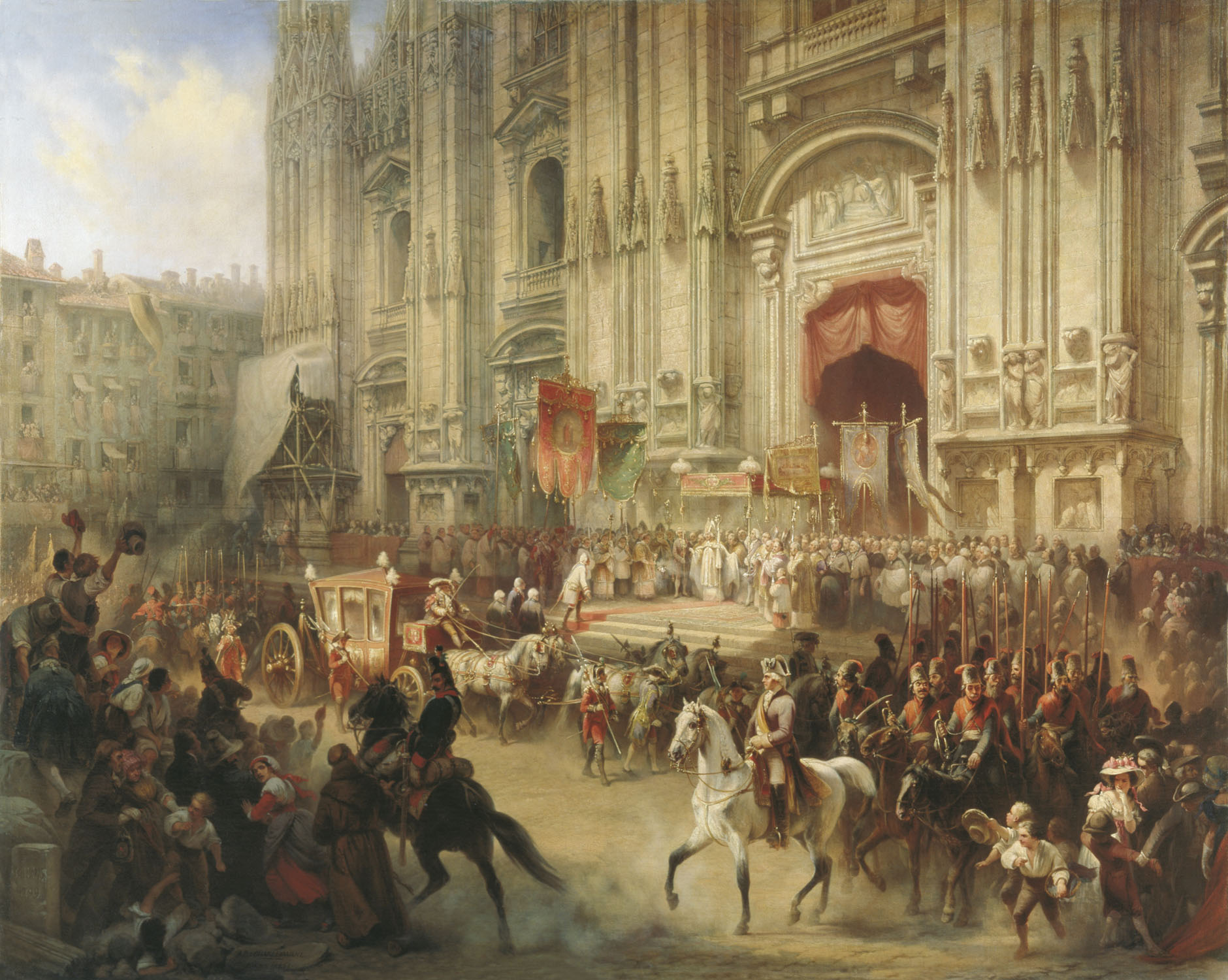
Suvorov in Milan, April 1799; by Adolf Charlemagne

In February 1799, Paul I, worried about the victories of France in Europe during the French Revolutionary Wars and at the insistence of the coalition leaders, was forced to reinstate Suvorov as field marshal. Alexander Suvorov was given command of the Austro-Russian army and sent to drive France's forces out of Italy. For subordination of the Austrian soldiers to a general of foreign service, it was deemed necessary to place him a step above the most senior Austrian generals of the army of Italy, also granting the field-marshal of the HRE.

Suvorov and Napoleon never met in battle because Napoleon was campaigning in Egypt and Syria at the time. However, in 1799, Suvorov erased practically all of the gains Napoleon had made for France in northern Italy during 1796 and 1797, defeating some of the republic's top generals: Moreau and Schérer at the Adda River (Lecco, Vaprio d'Adda, Cassano d'Adda, Verderio Superiore), again Moreau at San Giuliano (Spinetta Marengo (Note: The place where, a year later, Bonaparte would score his famous victory.)), MacDonald near the rivers of Tidone, Trebbia, Nure at the Trebbia battle, and Joubert along with Moreau at Novi; but the Russians lost the battle of Bassignana. All the major battles (Adda, Trebbia, Novi) are of the most decisive nature. Besides, the following Italian fortresses fell before Suvorov: Brescia (21 April); Peschiera del Garda, Tortona, Pizzighettone (April); Alessandria, Mantua (July). Suvorov captured Milan and Turin, as well as citadels of these cities, and became a hero to those who opposed the French Revolution. Allied forces also took the towns of Parma and Modena, the capitals of the Duchies of Parma–Piacenza and Modena–Reggio respectively. The British drawn many caricatures dedicated to Suvorov's expedition. (Note: Examples of Suvorov caricatures: "General Swallow-all-o Feasting on a French Fricassee!!" Library of Congress description: "Print shows a gigantic Russian soldier, possibly a gross caricature of Field Marshal Aleksandr Vasil'evich Suvorov, eating the severed head of a French soldier, another oversized man, a chef, holds a platter containing several more heads; refers to the defeat of the French in Italy by Russian forces under the command of Suvorov".; "General Swarrow, towing the French Directory into Russia!!" Suvorov took the French Directory captive. On Suvorov's uniform, on the right sleeve, a round red-yellow patch with the inscription "WARSAW" (reference to the Praga massacre).; "Gen'l Swallow Destroying the French Army." Giant Suvorov in a pirate hat catches the fleeing French troops with a forks, devours them and tramples others. Just below Suvorov, a French soldier hides under a cannon.; For others, see the related Wikicommons section:)

The French client states Cisalpine Republic and Piedmontese Republic collapsed in the face of Suvorov's onset. Admiral Ushakov, sent to the Mediterranean for support to Suvorov, in 1799 completed the five-month siege of Corfu (1798–1799) and put an end to the French occupation of the Ionian Islands in Greece. On receiving news of the capture of Corfu, Suvorov exclaimed:

Our Great Peter is alive! What he, after defeating the Swedish fleet near Åland in 1714, said, namely that nature has produced only one Russia: she has no rival, — we see it now. Hooray! To the Russian fleet!.. I now say to myself: why wasn't I at least a midshipman at Corfu?

==== Two resounding victories: Trebbia and Novi ====
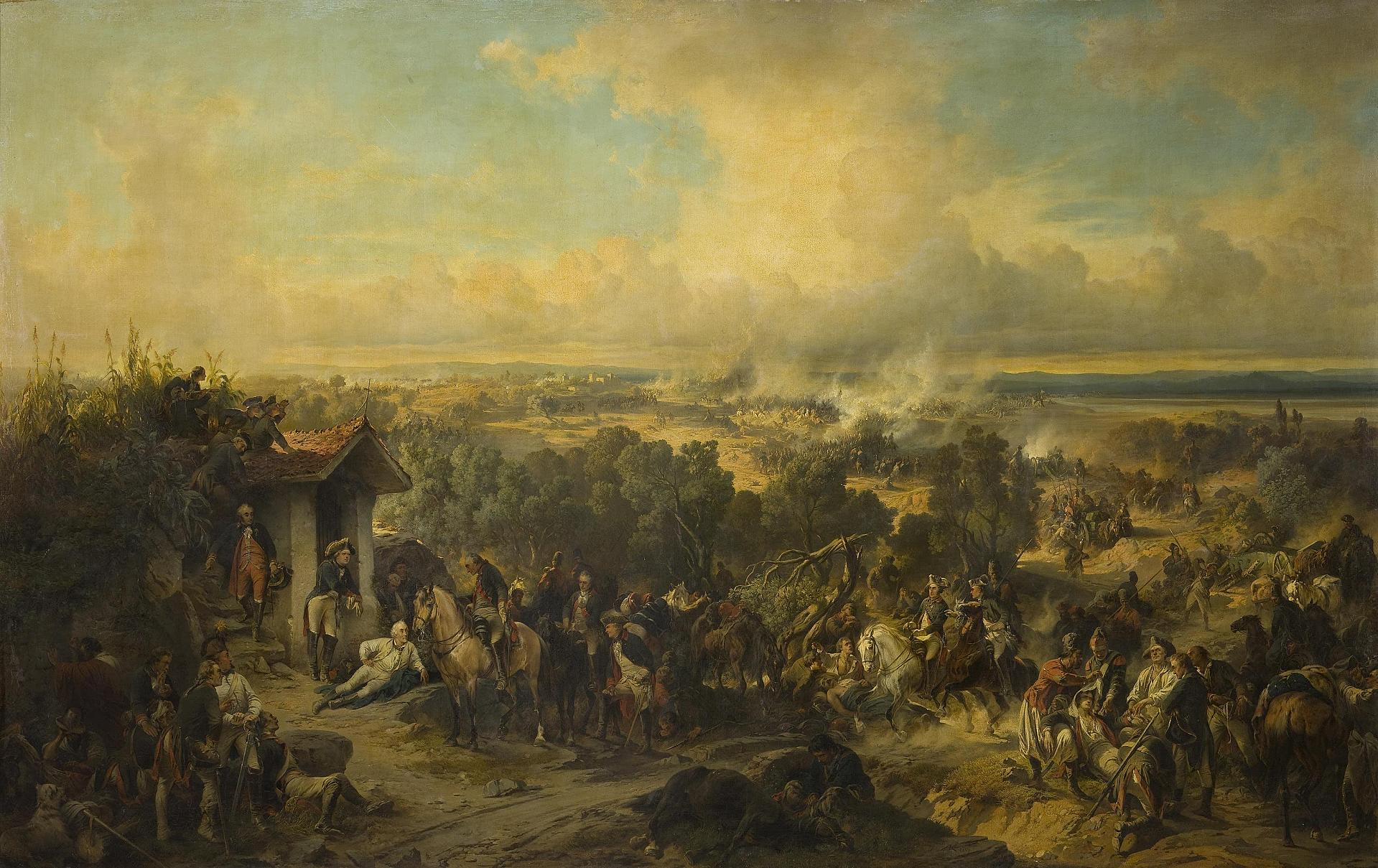
Suvorov victorious at the Battle of the Trebbia. Painting by Alexander Kotzebue. Hermitage Museum

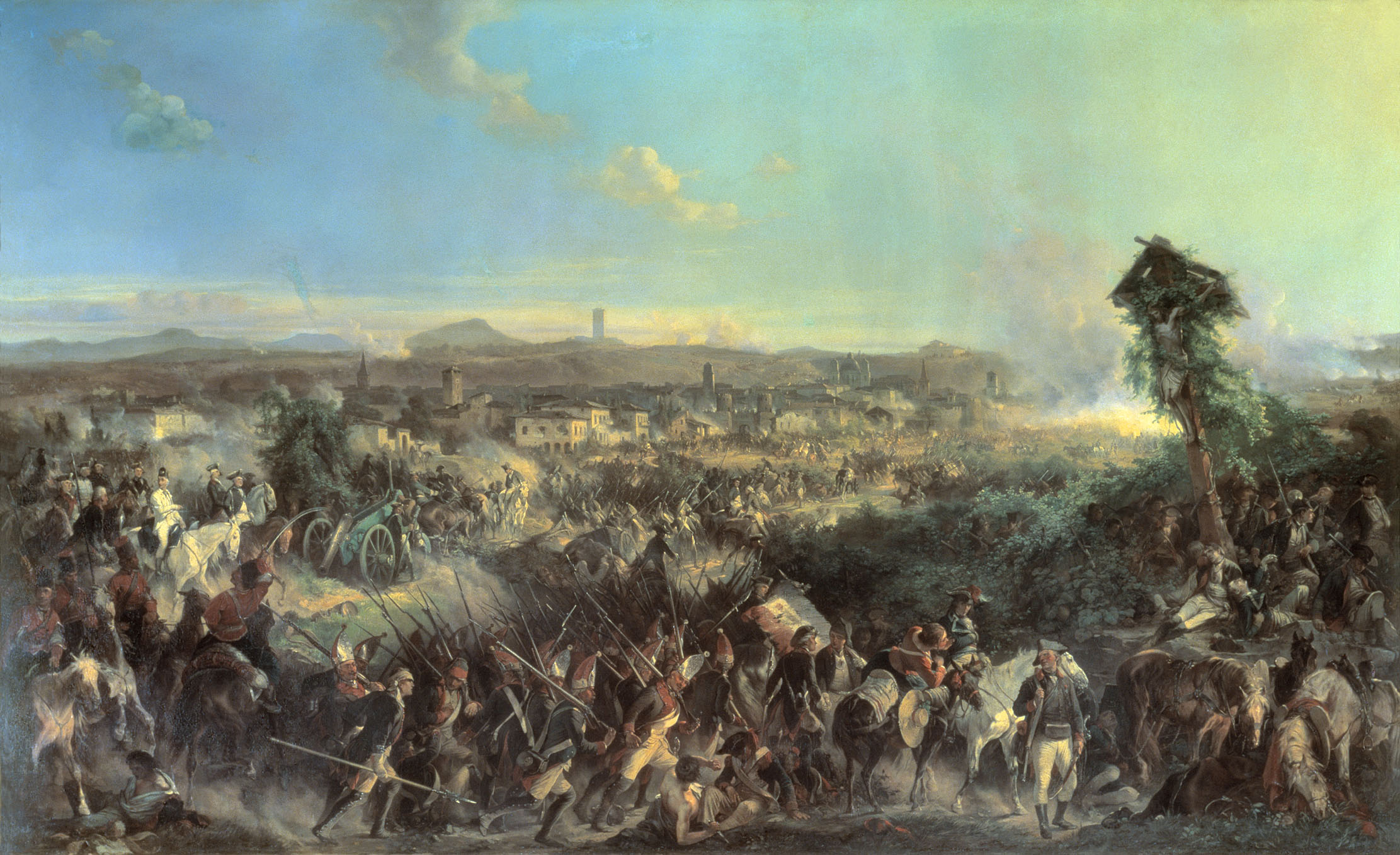
The heaviest battle in the career of Suvorov: at Novi, 15 August 1799. Painting by Alexander Kotzebue. Hermitage Museum

The sister republic in the south, the Parthenopean, also fell before the British Royal Navy, Ushakov's naval squadron, and the local rebels, since Jacques MacDonald at the head of the Army of Naples was forced to abandon southern Italy to meet Suvorov at the Trebbia, leaving only weak garrisons in the Neapolitan lands. MacDonald attacked Ott's small force, whereupon Suvorov quickly concentrated most of his army against MacDonald and threw his men into the fray immediately after a hard march. This confrontation near the Trebbia proved to be the toughest French defeat of Suvorov's Italian campaign: by the end of the retreat, MacDonald had barely 10,000 to 12,000 (Note: or up to 13,000) men left out of an army of 35,000. The battle of Novi, on the other hand, is the most difficult victory in Suvorov's career, largely because the French had strong defensive positions and the Allies could not fully deploy their superior cavalry as a consequence; however, the Russo-Austrian victory turned into a complete rout for the French army. Its troops lost 16,000 of their comrades-in-arms (in total) and were driven from Italy, save for a handful in the Maritime Alps and around Genoa. But the Hofkriegsrat did not choose to take advantage, and sent Suvorov with his Austrian and Russian forces to Switzerland. Suvorov himself gained the title of "Prince of the House of Savoy" and the rank of grand marshal of the Piedmont troops from the King of Sardinia, and after the Trebbian battle – the title of "Prince of Italy" (or Knyaz Italiysky).

==== Detailed assessment of all battles ====
Like Gustavus Adolphus, Turenne, Frederick II the Great, Alexander the Great, Hannibal, and Caesar, in military affairs Alexander Vasilyevich was not vulnerable at any point, rushing with speed to the most important places, and carefully observed the principle of force concentration all his life: at San Giuliano Vecchio (1st Marengo), for example, his troops gathered more than double superiority, and at Novi not so considerable, but at least reaching about 38 per cent, which was still offset by the French army's favourable position. The combat of Lecco, fought as a diversionary maneuver, brought virtually no advantage to either side, but at the beginning, before the reinforcements, the Russian troops were far inferior in numbers. At the combat of Vaprio (part of Cassano), passing through a river obstacle, the Coalition eventually managed to concentrate four thousand more troops in practice than the French did, largely also at the expense of the Cossacks; although in the middle of the battle the French had a twofold preponderance in numbers. In the end there were about 11,000 Austrians and Cossacks versus 7,000 French; but French troops began to give up their footholds before the remaining Austrian battalions arrived. Notwithstanding all, the outcome of the combat at Vaprio d'Adda could have been the only outcome: the timely arrival of 3,000 from Sérurier's division, 6,000 from Victor's division (2,000 he could have left at Cassano d'Adda on the way), would be 16,000 French, led by Moreau, against 11,000 of the enemy. At Cassano d'Adda, Suvorov allocated about 13,000 Austrians against approximately 3,000 French from the divisions of Paul Grenier and Claude-Victor (along with reinforcements), who had taken up strong defences behind the stream; but it was the combat of Vaprio that was decisive and pivotal. At Verderio the Sérurier detachment, cut off during the combat at Vaprio d'Adda, was surrounded and pinned down by the river. Thus, with roughly equal strength overall, having a minimum of 65,000 men at his disposal against the 58,000 available for active operations in the field as part of the French Army of Italy, Suvorov was able to use every advantage he had in the theater to win a complete victory at the battle of Cassano. The blame lies with Barthélemy Schérer: he scattered an even cordon along the whole river; on the more important stretch from Lecco to Cassano d'Adda, 42 km (26 mi), there were no more than 12,000; meanwhile Suvorov had 42,000 on the same stretch.

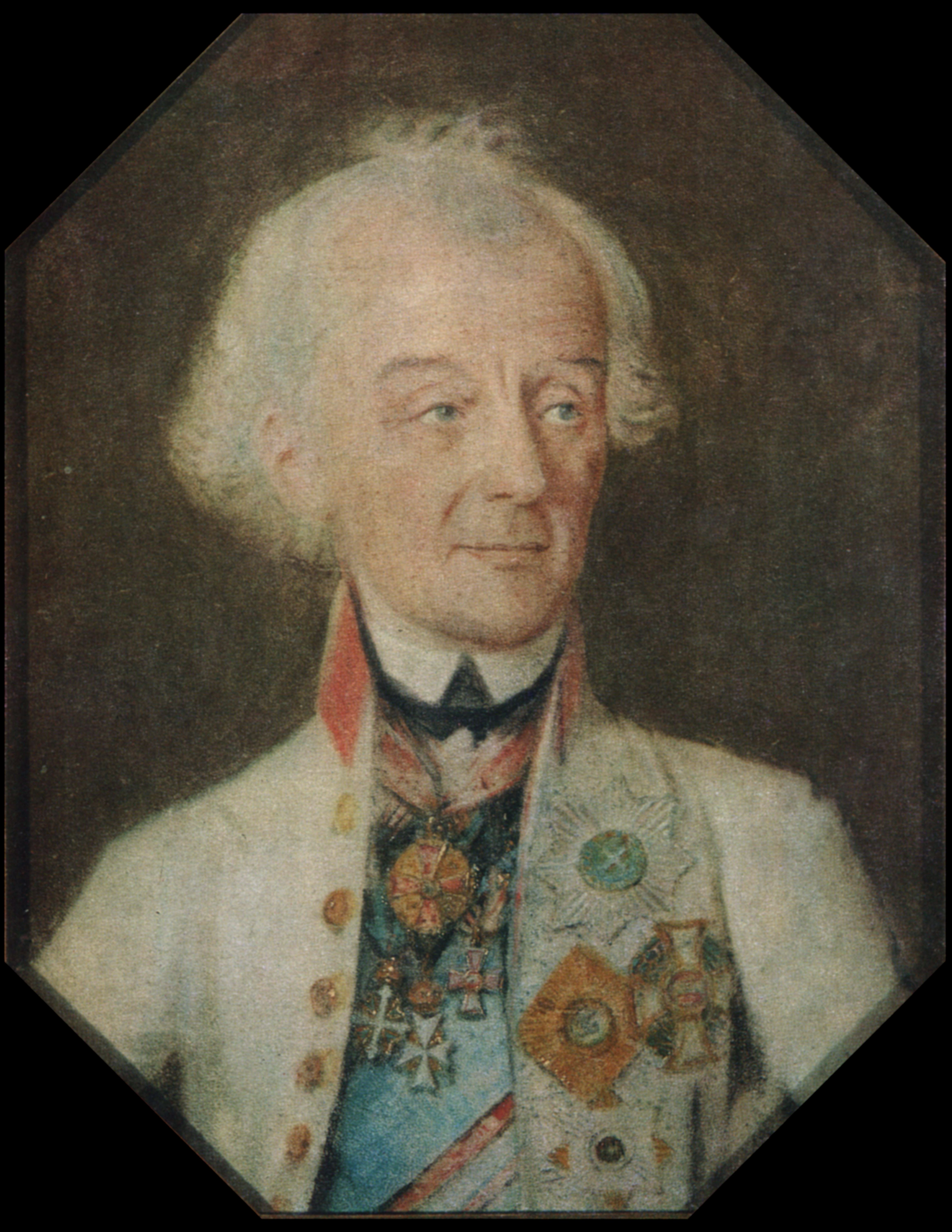
The portrait of Suvorov in Austrian uniform, by Johann Heinrich Schmidt

Near the Trebbia, in contrast to the above, MacDonald had one and a half superiority; this circumstance is explained by the fact that Kray, despite the order of Suvorov, did not send him reinforcements, based on the direct command of Holy Roman Emperor Francis II not to separate any forces before the surrender of Mantua. It was too late for the commander-in-chief to find out. At the battle of the Trebbia on the first day at the Tidone River, the French had 19,000 men against his 14–15,000, and were thrown back. By the Trebbia River itself on the second day the forces were equal, and on the third day Suvorov, with some 22,000 men, beat MacDonald's force of 33,000–35,000. Suvorov then rushed into a fighting pursuit, and at the Nure River, similar to Verderio, an entire Auvergne Regiment was captured after a short battle.

Despite the restraining influence of the Hofkriegsrat, Suvorov always held the initiative in his hands when dealing with the enemy. If the French sometimes tried to catch him (e.g., the movements of Moreau and MacDonald to join at Tortona), the Allies concentrated and dealt brutal blows like at the Trebbia. As for Novi, Joubert, advancing from Genoa to Tortona and expecting to catch the Allied Field Army scattered, unexpectedly met Suvorov and his "strike fist" behind Novi Ligure. But perseverance in the battle of Novi came to the point that when the Russian attacks were unsuccessful, Suvorov got off his horse and, rolling on the ground, shouted: "dig a grave for me, I will not survive this day", and then resumed his attacks. Moreau spoke of Suvorov in this way:

"What can you say of a general so resolute to a superhuman degree, and who would perish himself and let his army perish to the last man rather than retreat a single pace."

==== Campaign environment ====
As a disadvantage to his decisiveness, Field Marshal Suvorov, famous for the storming of Izmail, did not want to storm the citadels of Italian cities, and preferred to resort, in accordance with the situation, to blockade and siege. Nevertheless, during the Italian campaign of 1799 Suvorov's talent expressed itself fully and comprehensively. Nikolay Orlov describes: "When assessing Suvorov's actions, one must always keep in mind the unfavourable situation for the commander, the environment in which he was:—meaning mainly the inconvenience of commanding the Allied troops, originating from the difference in political aspirations of the Allied governments, and the binding influence of the Hofkriegsrat".

The Polish forces had a no small quantity of militias, and the Turks and Tartars were largely "unstable hordes". True, "all these opponents were characterised by fanatical bravery, it was not easy for Suvorov to overcome them; the wars brought Suvorov practice, from which he took out extensive experience, his talent gradually developed and strengthened in this fight, the commander learned the essence, the spirit of war". In 1799, Suvorov's enemies were troops purely regular, crowned with the glory of victories over the German armies (considered themselves the best in Europe), and were led by some of the best generals of the time, including Jean Victor Moreau, "a man in the prime of life" (35), who was generally respected in the army, distinguished by his theoretical knowledge of the art of war and combat experience, affability and high intelligence. "He was not a high-minded genius, but the presence of mind and unwavering equanimity gave him the ability to come out with honour from the most critical circumstances. At any rate, after Bonaparte, he was the best French general of the time" (the talented Lazare Hoche was no longer alive), winning the famous victory at Hohenlinden a year later. The theater of war was not like those steppes, swamps and forests, among which the commander had hitherto fought. In the war with the French Suvorov was not only commander-in-chief, independently acting in the theater of operations, but in addition he was in charge of the allied army – a matter even more difficult for a commander, and in the battles of Cassano and Novi the Austrians formed the bulk of the army, while at Cassano only irregular Cossack troops participated from the Russian side, including the encirclement of the French detachment at Verderio. It should also be noted that Suvorov, being fiery and irritable, was able to restrain himself in many cases.

=== Swiss campaign ===
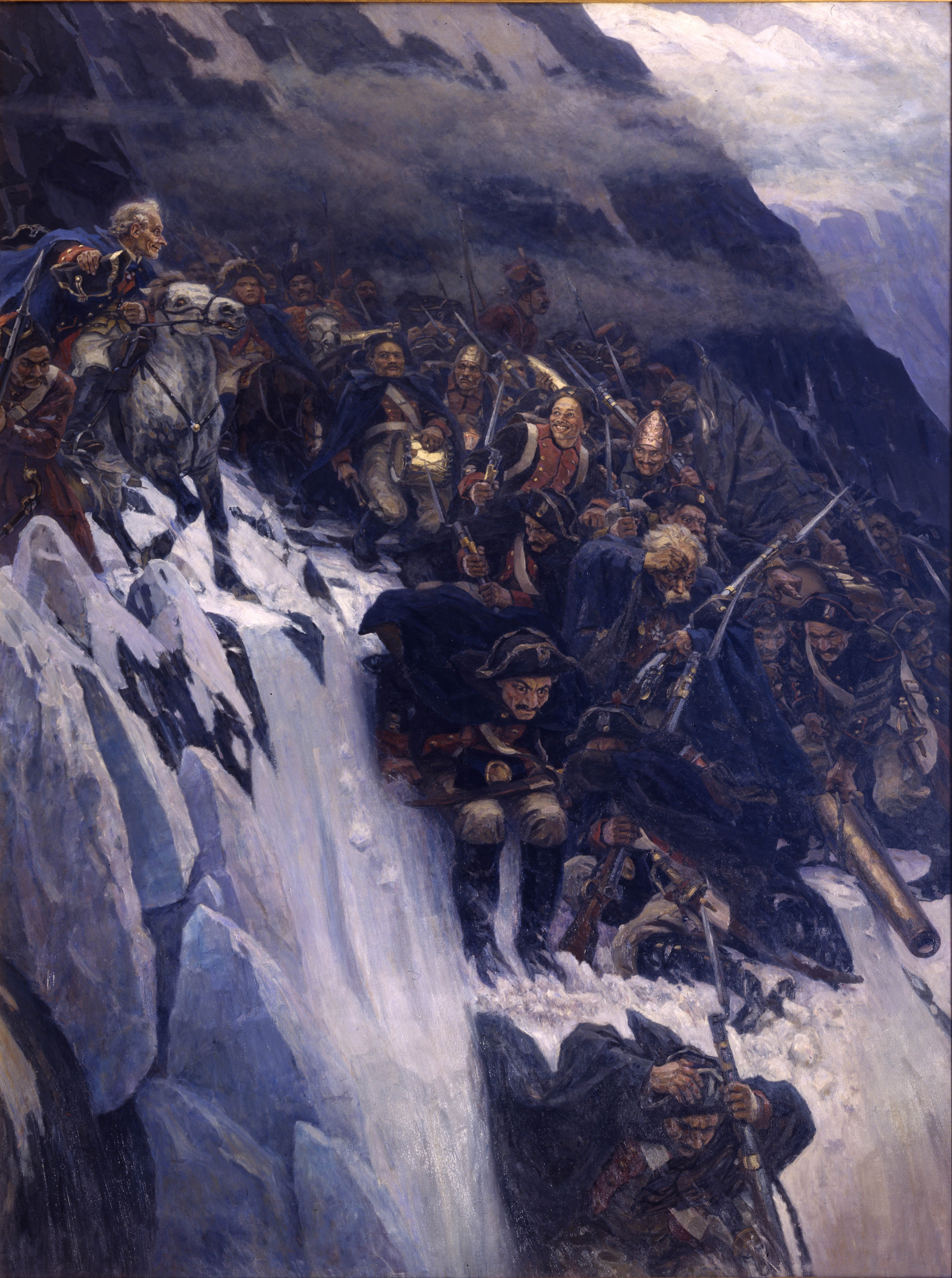
Russian troops under Generalissimo Suvorov crossing the Alps in 1799 (by Vasily Surikov, 1899)

==== Defeat of the allied armies ====
After the victorious Italian theater, Suvorov planned to march on Paris, but instead was ordered to Switzerland to join up with the Russian forces already there and drive the French out. The Russian army under General Korsakov was defeated by André Masséna at Zürich, and Friedrich von Hotze's Austrian army was defeated by Jean-de-Dieu Soult at the Linth River before Suvorov could reach and unite with them all. "…I have defeated myself Jelačić and Lincken who are now pinned down in Glarus. Marshal Suvorov is surrounded on all sides. He will be the one forced to surrender!"—said Gabriel Jean Joseph Molitor to Franz von Auffenberg and Pyotr Ivanovich Bagration.

Surrounded by Masséna's 77,000 French troops, Suvorov with a force of 18,000 Russian regulars and 5,000 Cossacks, exhausted and short of provisions, led a strategic withdrawal from the Alps while fighting off the French.

Fieldmarshal Suvorov on the peak of the Gotthard Pass, by Adolf Charlemagne

==== Early achievements ====
Early on in the path, going to join with the not yet defeated Korsakov, he struggled against general Claude Lecourbe and overcame the St. Gotthard and Oberalp (that goes round Oberalpsee) mountain passes. Suvorov's troops beat the French out of Hospental (situated in the Urseren valley), followed by the so-called Teufelsbrücke, or "Devil's Bridge", located in the Schoellenen Gorge, and the Urnerloch rock tunnel. All these interventions were not without great losses for Suvorov; but in his main attack, where he concentrated some 6,700 against 6,000 Frenchmen, he suffered relatively the same casualties as his opponent. However, Suvorov's troops were at their wits' end.

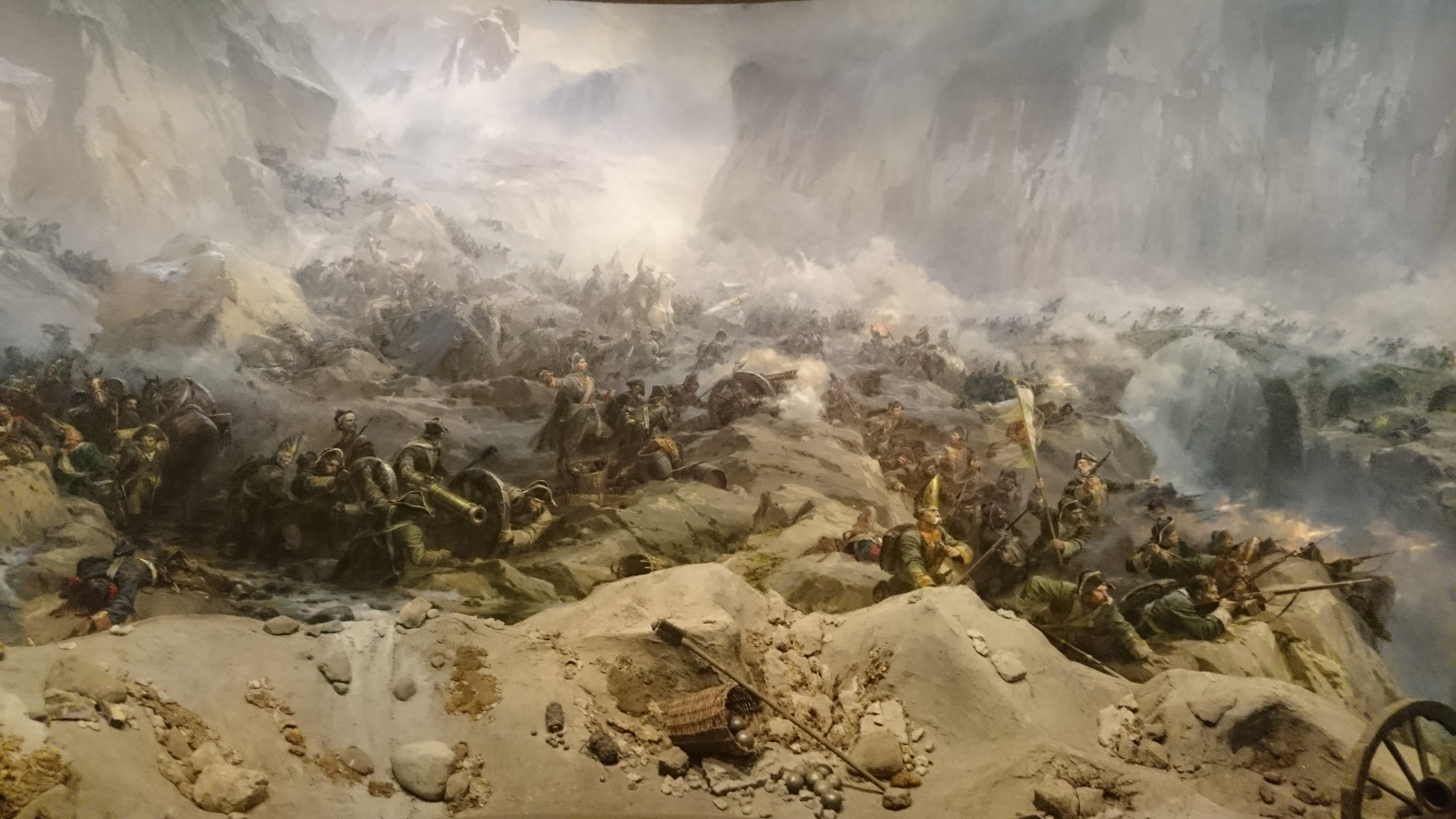
Fighting for the Devil's Bridge

Russian troops of Andrey Grigoryevich Rosenberg crossed the Lukmanier Pass, Austrian troops of Franz Auffenberg overcame the Chrüzli Pass, while Suvorov himself also later traversed more remote passes such as Chinzig and Pragel (Bragell), before climbing the 8,000-foot mountain Rossstock. Marching over rocks had worn out the soldiers' inadequate footwear, of which many were now even deprived, uniforms were often in tatters, rifles and bayonets were rusting from the constant dampness, and the men were starving for lack of adequate supplies,—they were exhausted, surrounded by impassable mountains in freezing cold, and, one way or another, faced a French army far superior in numbers and equipment. Cossack reconnaissance units instead of the Austrians of Lincken found the French there. France's forces, meanwhile, blocked off many important places for troop movements; and on September 29 (18 OS), still uncertain but informed about the fate of Korsakov and Hotze (from the testimony of French prisoners), Suvorov assembled a council of war in the refectory of the Franciscan monastery of Saint Joseph, which decided to pave the way for the army toward Glarus. During the council the Russian commander showed himself extremely resolute not to surrender, blamed the Austrian allies for all the hardships they were forced to suffer, and proposed what appeared to him to be the only possible solution. Suvorov dictated the disposition: in the vanguard appointed to go Auffenberg, who came out on the 29th, and the next day the rest of the troops, except for Rosenberg's corps and Foerster's division, which remained in the rearguard and must hold the enemy coming out of Schwyz until all the packs had passed over the mountain Bragell. Rosenberg was ordered to hold firm,—to repel the French with all his strength, but not to pursue him beyond Schwyz. Alexander Suvorov's speech was written down from the words of Pyotr Ivanovich Bagration, made a huge impression on everyone who attended (especially angry and menacing looked Derfelden and Bagration):

We are surrounded by mountains… surrounded by a strong enemy, proud of victory… Since the Pruth expedition, under the Sovereign Emperor Peter the Great, Russian troops have never been in such a perilous position… To go back is dishonorable. I have never retreated. Advancing to Schwyz (Note: When Suvorov was unaware of Korsakov's defeat, in the absence of news he preferred not to stop to let his exhausted army rest, which he directed instead, as early as the early hours of September 27, toward the Chinzig Chulm, counting on bypassing the French by reaching Schwyz from the village of Muotathal (Mutten).) is impossible: Masséna commands more than 60,000 men and our troops do not reach 20,000. We are short of supplies, ammunition and artillery… We cannot expect help from anyone. We are on the edge of the precipice! All we have left is to rely on Almighty God and the courage and spirit of sacrifice of my troops! We are Russians! God is with us!

==== Salvation and breakthrough ====
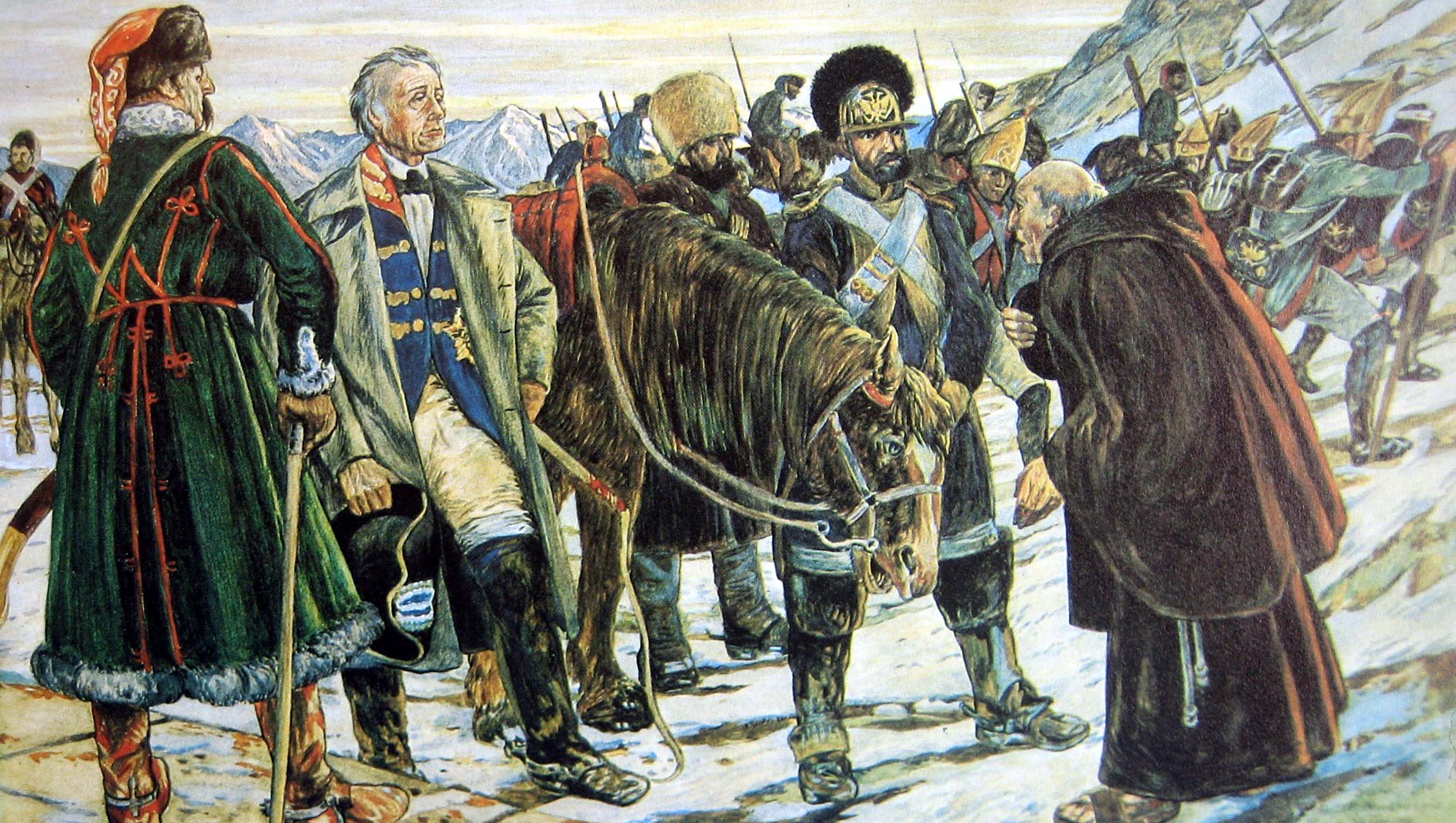
In the Altkirch Barracks in Andermatt, a mural painted in 1917 by Hans Beat Wieland in the officers' canteen commemorates the arrival of the Suvorov troops at the St. Gotthard Hospice on September 24, 1799, during the War of the Second Coalition. Andermatt, Altkirch Barracks, UR

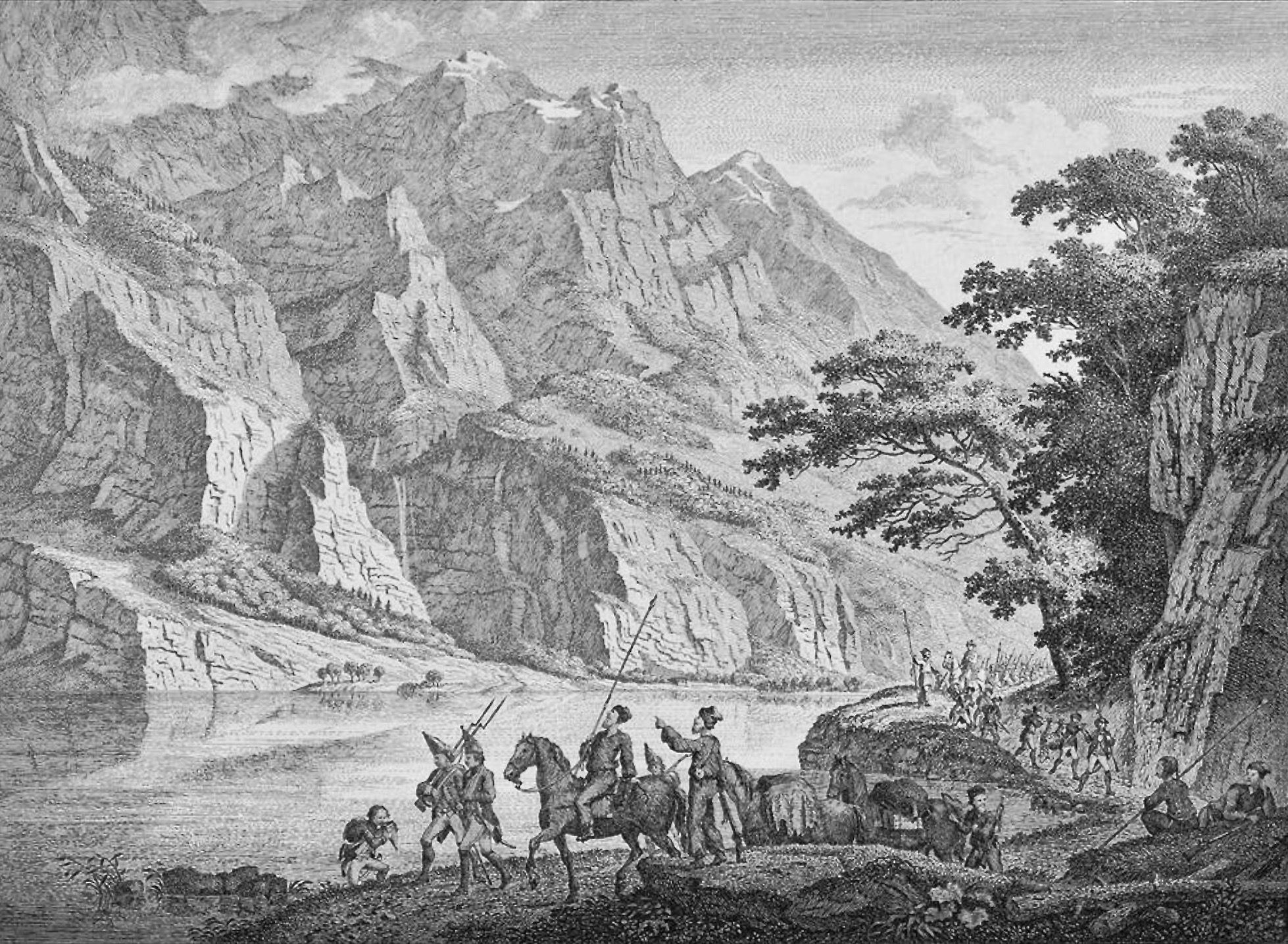
Cossacks over Klöntalersee by Ludwig Hess. Zurich Central Library, Prints and Drawings Department and Photo Archive

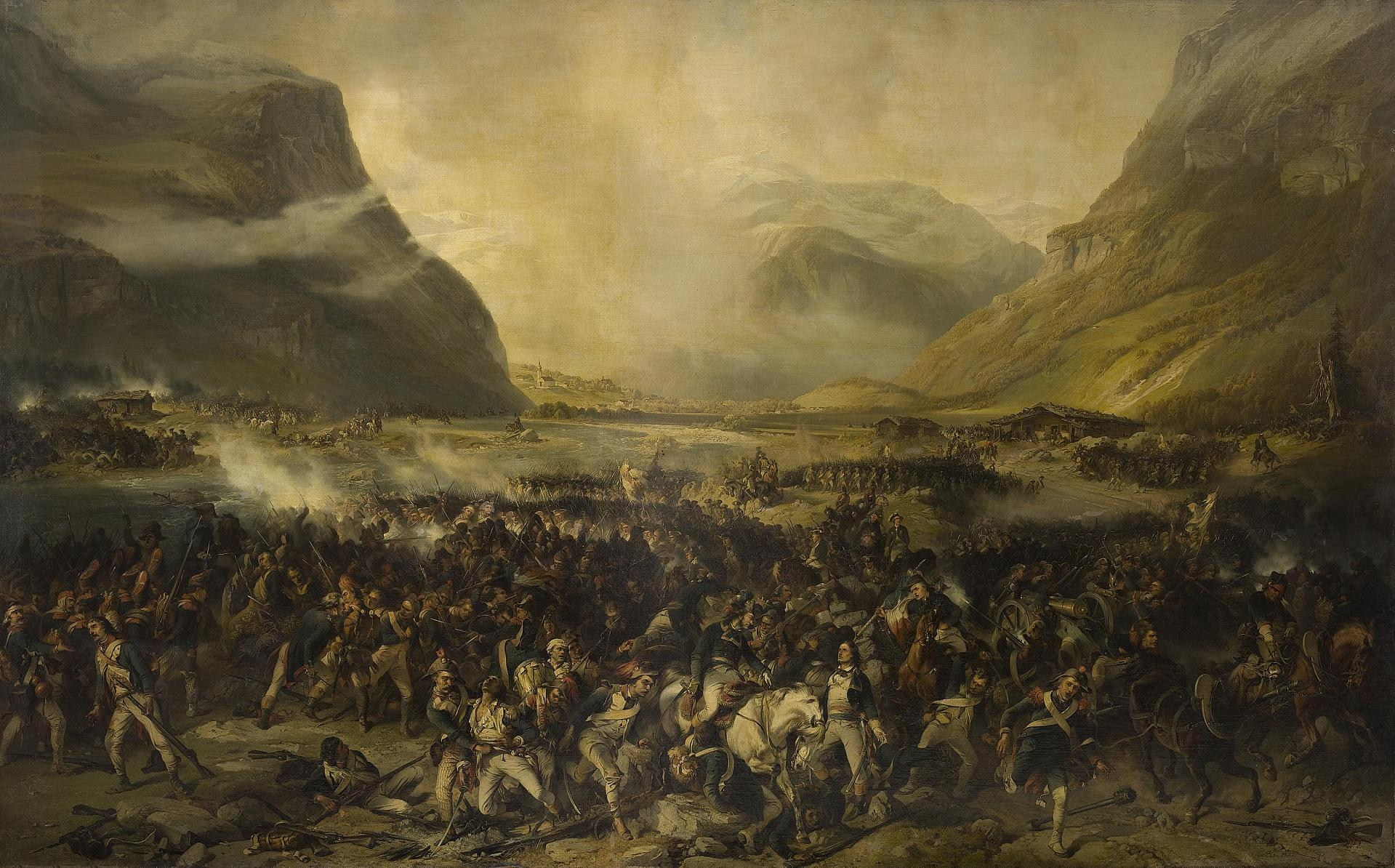
Battle of the Muotatal (Muttental), painting by Alexander von Kotzebue

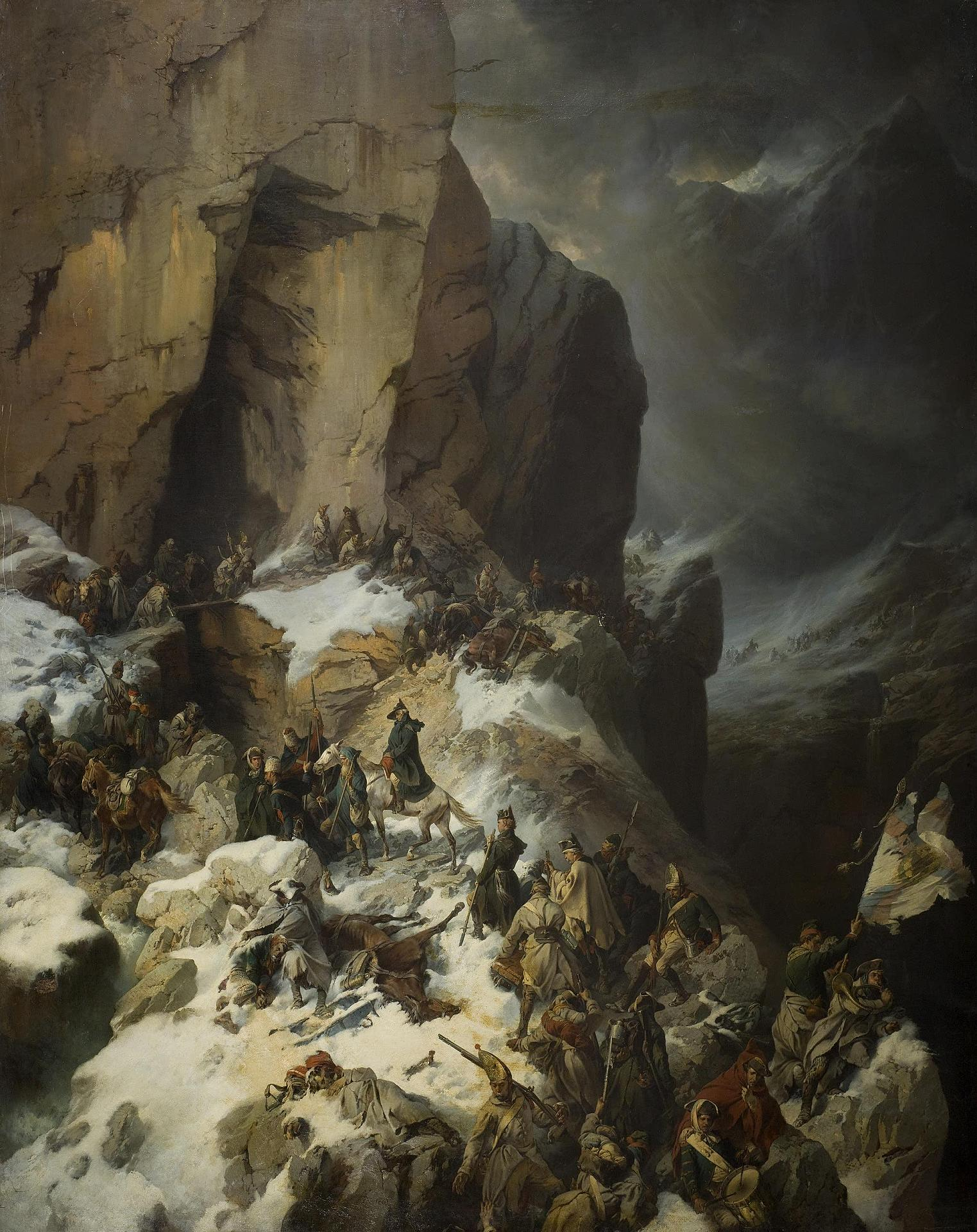
Suvorov crossing the Panix Pass, painting by Alexander von Kotzebue

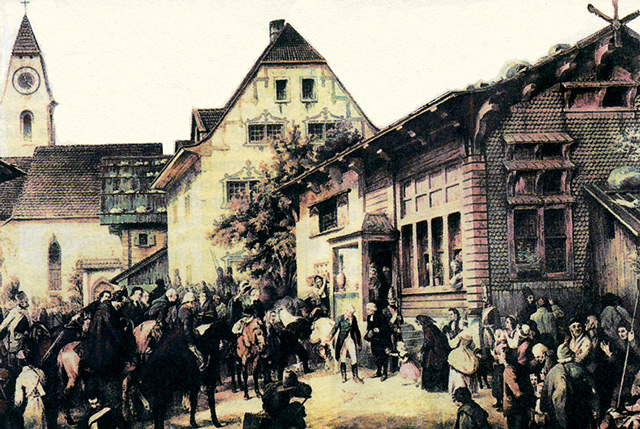
Suvorov Bidding Farewell to the Swiss People. Painting by Andrei Andreyevich Popov (1896).

Between 30 September and 1 October 1799, Suvorov's vanguard of 2,100 men, led by Bagration, was able to break through the Klöntal valley,—with Klöntalersee inside,—and reached the goal. It inflicted 1,000 killed or wounded, and another 1,000 captured to a French force of 6,500 men. However, Bagration tried to push further than Glarus, failing to do so: he was finally stopped by Molitor's troops.

When Molitor took up a position at Netstal, he held for a long time, in spite of Bagration's persistent attacks. Finally driven out of Netstal with the loss of a cannon, a banner and 300 prisoners, Molitor retreated to Näfels, on both banks of the river Linth. Here the French took a strong position, where they again repulsed Bagration long and hard. No matter how weakened Bagration's troops were by the previous battles and heavy march through the mountains, they had so far gained superior numbers over Molitor's detachment. Molitor had gone into full retreat, but the long-expected advance troops of Gazan soon came to his aid. The French now received an overwhelming strength and knocked them out of Näfels. Bagration in turn attacked Näfels and drove off the French, who then went on the attack again. Five or six times the village passed from hand to hand, and when last time it was occupied by the Russians, Bagration received orders from Suvorov to withdraw to Netstal, where at that time the rest of Derfelden's troops were already concentrated. It was evening when Bagration came out of Näfels; noticing this, Gazan moved all his forces to the attack and himself led the grenadiers to the bayonets; but this time the French were also repulsed, and Bagration's troops retreated quite calmly to Netstal.

Meanwhile, on the same days, the rearguard of 7,000 men out of a total of 14,000, commanded by Andrey Rosenberg, who, according to plan, was assigned the task of deterrence, met with Masséna's forces, which numbered up to 15,000 men out of 24,000 in the Muotatal (Muota valley), formerly Muttental. Suvorov ordered to hold on there at all costs, and the rearguard, suffering 500 to 700 casualties, routed the French by inflicting them between 2,700 and 4,000 losses in two days. More than 1,000 prisoners alone were taken, including a general and 15 officers. Suvorov reported to Paul 6,500 French dead, wounded and prisoners of war in two days of fighting: 1,600 – September 30 and 4,500 – October 1. While Suvorov was fighting the French, the short-lived Roman sister republic had also fallen before the troops of the restored Kingdom of Naples.

Despite all the Russian successes on the battlefield, they were not going to win the campaign. Suvorov hoped to make the way for his exhausted, ill-supplied troops over the Swiss passes to the Upper (Alpine) Rhine and arrive at Vorarlberg, where the army, much shattered after a lot of crossing and fighting, almost destitute of horses and artillery, went into winter quarters. When Suvorov battled his way through the snow-capped Alps his army was checked but never defeated. Suvorov refused to call it a retreat and commenced a trek through the deep snows of the Panixer (Ringenkopf) Pass and into the 9,000-foot mountains of the Bündner Oberland, by then deep in snow. Thousands of Russians slipped from the cliffs or succumbed to cold and hunger, eventually escaping encirclement and reached Chur on the Rhine, with the bulk of his army intact at 16,000 men. After the troops reached Chur, they crossed another pass in the form of the St. Luzisteig, and hence left the territory of present-day Switzerland.

For this marvel of strategic retreat, earning him the nickname of the Russian Hannibal, Suvorov became the fourth Generalissimo of Russia on 8 November 1799 (28 OS). Historian Christopher Duffy, on the back cover of his book Eagles Over the Alps: Suvorov in Italy and Switzerland, 1799, called Suvorov's whole Italian and Swiss adventure a kind of Russian "crusade" against the forces of revolution.

==== Consequences ====
Recently, beginning with his involuntary stay in the village of Konchanskoye, Suvorov often felt unwell; when he returned to duty, he seemed to have recovered, but by the end of the Italian campaign again began to grow weak. Before the Swiss campaign, his weakness was so great that he could hardly walk, his eyes began to hurt more often than before; old wounds started making themselves felt, especially on his leg, so that he could not always put on a boot. The Swiss campaign made him sicker; he began to complain of cold, which had never happened before; the cough, which had become attached to him some months before, did not leave him either, and the wind became particularly sensitive. He was officially promised a military triumph in Russia, but Emperor Paul cancelled the ceremony and recalled the Russian armies from Europe, including the Batavian Republic after the unsuccessful Anglo-Russian invasion of Holland; and ultimately the French would regain all of their captured possessions on the Italian Peninsula, though with heavy casualties.

== On the road from Switzerland to Russia ==
The return journey of Suvorov to Russia lasted more than three months.

Suvorov's name, which had grown during the Italian campaign, took on a double luster after the Swiss campaign, and when he retired from the theatre of war and entered Holy Roman Empire (Germany), he became the centre of attention. Travellers, diplomats and soldiers flocked to his destinations, especially on his longer stops in Lindau, Augsburg and Prague. "A general reverence bordering on awe", ladies sought out the honour of kissing his hand, and he did not particularly resist this. Everywhere he was welcomed and seen off, though he avoided it; every social gathering was eager to have him as its guest.

Russian society was proud of its hero and worshipped him enthusiastically. The Emperor Paul was a "true" representative of the national mood; he accompanied all his rescripts with expressions of the most gracious disposition to the Generalissimo, spoke of his unanimity with him, asked advice, and apologised for giving instructions himself. "Forgive me, Prince Alexander Vasilievich," wrote the tsar, "may the Lord God preserve you, and you preserve the Russian soldiers, of whom some were everywhere victorious because they were with you, and others were not victorious because they were not with you". In other rescript it has told:

"…excuse me, that I have taken it upon myself to give you advice; but as I only give it for preservation of my subjects, which have rendered me so much merit under your leadership, I am sure, that you with pleasure will accept it, knowing your affection to me."

In the third:

"I shall be pleased if you will come to me to advice and to love, after you have bring the Russian troops into our borders."

The fourth reads:

"It is not for me, my hero, to reward you, you are above my measures, but for me to feel it and appreciate it in my heart, giving you your due."

The Tsar had extended his courtesy to the point that, in reply to Suvorov's New Year greetings, he asked him to share them with his troops if he, the Tsar, was "worthy of it" and expressed his desire "to be worthy of such an army".

=== Suvorov, Nelson, Coburg, and Charles ===
The famous Admiral Lord Nelson, who, according to the Russian ambassador in London, was at that time together with Suvorov the "idol" of the English nation, also sent the Generalissimo an enthusiastic letter. "There is no man in Europe," he wrote, "who loves you as I do; all marvel, like Nelson, at your great exploits, but he loves you for your contempt of wealth". Someone called Suvorov "the land Nelson"; Nelson was very flattered by this. Someone else said that there is a very great similarity in appearance between the Russian Generalissimo and the British Admiral. Rejoicing at this, Nelson added in a letter to Suvorov that although his, Nelson's, deeds can not equal with those of Suvorov, but he asked Suvorov not to deprive him of the dear name of a loving brother and sincere friend. Suvorov answered Nelson in the same way, and expressed his pleasure that their portraits certify the similarity existing between the originals, but in particular was proud of the fact that the two were alike in their way of thinking.

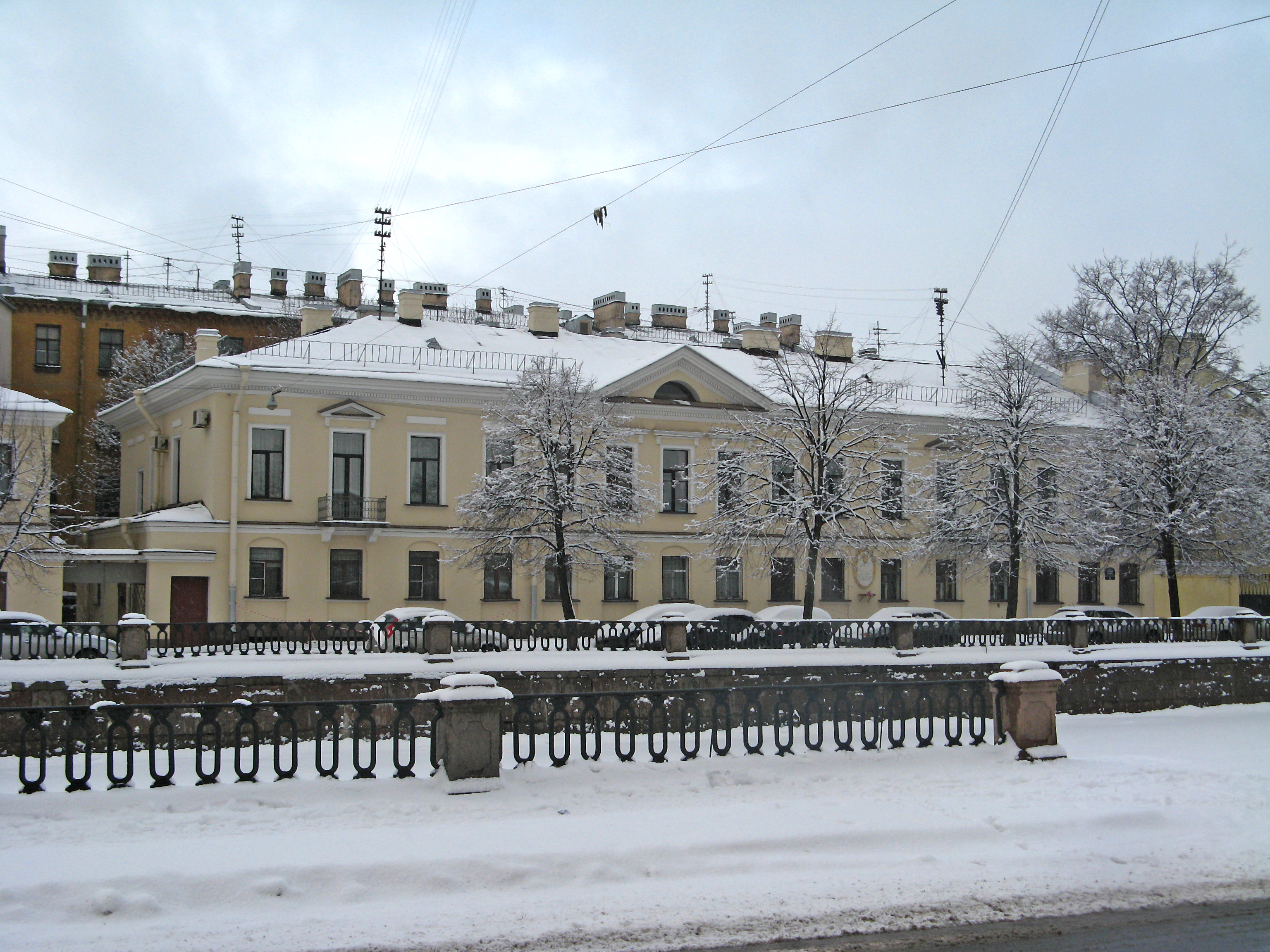
Martha Fomina' House, where Alexander V. Suvorov repeatedly stayed in 1791, 1798 and died in 1800: Kryukov channel, 23, Admiralteysky District.

He also received a warm welcome from his old associate, the Prince of Coburg. The Grand Duke Constantine went to Coburg, through whom Suvorov conveyed a letter or bow to the Prince and via the same Grand Duke received a reply. The Prince called him the greatest hero of his time, thanked him for his memory, lamented the Russian army's removal to the fatherland and lamented the bitter fate of Germany. Suvorov replied to the Prince and said among other things that the entire reason for the failure lies in the differences of systems, and if the systems do not come together, there is no point in starting a new campaign.

Furthermore, a little earlier he had correspondence with Archduke Charles, which, however, was of a sharp nature. Suvorov received greetings and congratulations even from strangers.

=== St. Petersburg ===
Early in 1800, Suvorov returned to Saint Petersburg. Paul, for some reason, refused to give him an audience, and, worn out and ill, the old veteran died a few days afterwards on 18 May 1800, at Saint Petersburg. The main reason for the newly emerged disfavor of Emperor Paul to Suvorov remains uncertain. Suvorov was meant to receive the funeral honors of a Generalissimo, but was buried as an ordinary field marshal due to Paul's direct interference. Lord Whitworth, the British ambassador, and the poet Gavrila Derzhavin were the only persons of distinction present at the funeral. Suvorov lies buried in the Church of the Annunciation in the Alexander Nevsky Monastery, the simple inscription on his grave stating, according to his own direction, "Here lies Suvorov".

== Military record ==
Key to opponent flags

Kingdom of Prussia (1701–1918)	Polish–Lithuanian Commonwealth (1569–1795)	Kingdom of France (987–1792)	Holy Roman Empire (800/962–1806)	Ottoman Empire (c. 1299–1922)	Crimean Khanate (1441–1783)	Regency of Algiers (1516–1830)	(Autonomous Republic of Crimea) Crimean Tatars	(French First Republic) French Republic (1792–1804)	(Poland) Polish Legions (1797–1815)	Helvetic Republic (1798–1803)	Piedmontese Republic (1798–1799)	Cisalpine Republic (1797–1802)

Key to outcome

Indicates a favorable outcome Indicates an unfavorable outcome Indicates an uncertain or mixed outcome

Summary (incomplete)
№	Date(s)	Clash(es)	Type(s)	Conflict(s)	Opponent(s)	Location(s)	Outcome(s)
1.	25 July 1759	Combat of Crossen	Open Battle	Seven Years' War	(Kingdom of Prussia)	Margraviate of Brandenburg	Victory
2.	12 August 1759	Battle of Kunersdorf	Open Battle	Seven Years' War	(Kingdom of Prussia)	Margraviate of Brandenburg	Decisive victory
3.	October 1760	Raid on Berlin	Raid; Occupation	Seven Years' War	(Kingdom of Prussia)	Margraviate of Brandenburg	Berlin occupied for three days
4.	1761	Combat of Reichenbach	Open Battle	Seven Years' War	(Kingdom of Prussia)	Austrian Silesia	Victory
5.	1761	Skirmish of Schweidnitz	Open Battle	Seven Years' War	(Kingdom of Prussia)	Austrian Silesia	Victory
6.	15 September 1761	Combat of Landsberg	Open Battle	Seven Years' War	(Kingdom of Prussia)	Margraviate of Brandenburg	Victory
7.	1761	Combat of the Friedberg Forest	Open Battle	Seven Years' War	(Kingdom of Prussia)	Prussia	Victory
8.	11 October 1761	Storming of Golnau	Storming Fortifications	Seven Years' War	(Kingdom of Prussia)	Prussia	Victory
9.	20–21 November 1761	Assault on Neugarten	FIBUA	Seven Years' War	(Kingdom of Prussia)	Margraviate of Brandenburg	Victory
10.	1761	Combat of Stargard	Open Battle	Seven Years' War	(Kingdom of Prussia)	Province of Pomerania	Victory
11.	24 August – 16 December 1761	Third Siege of Kolberg	Siege	Seven Years' War	(Kingdom of Prussia)	Province of Pomerania	Victory
12.	13 September 1769	Battle of Orzechowo	Open Battle	War of the Bar Confederation	(Polish–Lithuanian Commonwealth)	Brest Litovsk Voivodeship	Decisive victory
13.	1770	Combat of Nawodzice	Open Battle	War of the Bar Confederation	(Polish–Lithuanian Commonwealth)	Sandomierz Voivodeship	Victory
14.	July 1770	Combat of Opatów	Open Battle	War of the Bar Confederation	(Polish–Lithuanian Commonwealth)	Sandomierz Voivodeship	Victory
15.	20 February 1771	Lanckorona clashes; • Combat of Lanckorona	Open Battle	War of the Bar Confederation	(Polish–Lithuanian Commonwealth) (Kingdom of France)	Kraków Voivodeship	Victory
16.	20 February 1771	Lanckorona clashes; • Storming of the Lanckorona Castle	Storming Fortifications	War of the Bar Confederation	(Polish–Lithuanian Commonwealth) (Kingdom of France)	Kraków Voivodeship	Defeat
17.	27 February 1771	Assault on Rachów	FIBUA	War of the Bar Confederation	(Polish–Lithuanian Commonwealth)	Lublin Voivodeship	Victory
18.	27–28 February 1771	Combat of Kraśnik	Open Battle	War of the Bar Confederation	(Polish–Lithuanian Commonwealth)	Lublin Voivodeship	Victory
19.	20 May 1771	Action of the Tyniec Abbey	Storming Fortifications	War of the Bar Confederation	(Polish–Lithuanian Commonwealth) (Holy Roman Empire)	Kraków Voivodeship	Defeat
20.	21 May 1771	Lanckorona clashes; • Battle of Lanckorona	Open Battle	War of the Bar Confederation	(Polish–Lithuanian Commonwealth) (Kingdom of France) (Holy Roman Empire)	Kraków Voivodeship	Decisive victory
21.	22 May 1771	Combat of Zamość	Open Battle	War of the Bar Confederation	(Polish–Lithuanian Commonwealth)	Ruthenian Voivodeship	Victory
22.	24 September 1771	Battle of Stołowicze	Open Battle	War of the Bar Confederation	(Polish–Lithuanian Commonwealth)	Nowogródek Voivodeship	Decisive victory
23.	24 January – 26 April 1772	Siege of the Kraków Castle; • Storming of the Krakow Castle	Siege	War of the Bar Confederation	(Polish–Lithuanian Commonwealth) (Kingdom of France)	Kraków Voivodeship	Victory; • Defeat in the storming
24.	8 May 1773	Combat of Oltenița	Open Battle	Sixth Russo-Turkish War		Wallachia	Victory
25.	21 May 1773	Turtukaya engagements; • First Storming of Turtukaya	Open Battle; Storming Fortifications	Sixth Russo-Turkish War		Ottoman Bulgaria	Decisive victory
26.	28 June 1773	Turtukaya engagements; • Second Storming of Turtukaya	Storming Fortifications; Open Battle	Sixth Russo-Turkish War		Ottoman Bulgaria	Decisive victory
27.	14 September 1773	Defence of Hirsovo	Storming Fortifications; Open Battle	Sixth Russo-Turkish War		Dobruja	Victory
28.	20 June 1774	Battle of Kozludzha	Open Battle	Sixth Russo-Turkish War		Ottoman Bulgaria	Decisive victory
29.	1 October 1783	Battle of the Laba	Open Battle	Kuban Nogai uprising		Kuban	Decisive victory
30.	11–12 October 1787	Battle of Kinburn	Storming Fortifications; Open Battle	Seventh Russo-Turkish War	(Regency of Algiers)	Silistra Eyalet	Decisive victory
31.	May – 17 December 1788	Siege of Ochakov; • Battle of 28 June 1788; • Sortie of 7 August 1788	Siege	Seventh Russo-Turkish War		Silistra Eyalet	Victory; • Defeat by the sortie
32.	18 November 1788	Assault on Berezan Island	Storming Fortifications	Seventh Russo-Turkish War		Black Sea	Victory
33.	1 August 1789	Battle of Focșani	Open Battle	Seventh Russo-Turkish War		Moldavia	Decisive victory
34.	22 September 1789	Battle of Rymnik	Open Battle	Seventh Russo-Turkish War		Wallachia	Decisive victory
35.	21–22 December 1790	Storming of Izmail	Storming Fortifications	Seventh Russo-Turkish War	(Autonomous Republic of Crimea)	Silistra Eyalet	Decisive victory
36.	15 September 1794	Combat of Kobryń	Open Battle	Polish Revolution of 1794	(Polish–Lithuanian Commonwealth)	Brest Litovsk Voivodeship	Victory
37.	17 September 1794	Battle of Krupczyce	Open Battle	Polish Revolution of 1794	(Polish–Lithuanian Commonwealth)	Brest Litovsk Voivodeship	Decisive victory
38.	19 September 1794	Combat of Dywin	Open Battle	Polish Revolution of 1794	(Polish–Lithuanian Commonwealth)	Brest Litovsk Voivodeship	Victory
39.	19 September 1794	Battle of Terespol (Battle of Brest)	Open Battle	Polish Revolution of 1794	(Polish–Lithuanian Commonwealth)	Brest Litovsk Voivodeship	Decisive victory
40.	26 October 1794	Battle of Kobyłka	Open Battle	Polish Revolution of 1794	(Polish–Lithuanian Commonwealth)	Masovian Voivodeship	Victory
41.	2–4 November 1794	Storming of Praga	Open Battle; Storming Fortifications	Polish Revolution of 1794	(Polish–Lithuanian Commonwealth)	Warsaw	Decisive victory
42.	21 April 1799	Capture of Brescia	Surrender	Italian campaign	(French First Republic)	Cisalpine Republic	Victory
43.	26 April 1799; 27–28 April 1799	Battle of the Adda River; • Combat of Lecco; • Battle of Cassano	Open Battle; Storming Fortifications	Italian campaign	(French First Republic) (Poland) (Helvetic Republic)	Cisalpine Republic	Decisive victory
44.	16 May 1799	Battle of San Giuliano (First Battle of Marengo)	Open Battle	Italian campaign	(French First Republic) (Helvetic Republic)	Piedmontese Republic	Victory
45.	till 20 June 1799	Siege of Turin Citadel	Siege	Italian campaign	(French First Republic)	Turin	Victory
46.	17–20 June 1799	Battle of the Trebbia; • Combat of the Tidone; • Combats of the Trebbia; • Combat of the Nure	Open Battle	Italian campaign	(French First Republic) (Poland)	Duchy of Parma	Decisive victory
47.	15 August 1799	Battle of Novi	Open Battle; Storming Fortifications	Italian campaign	(French First Republic) (Poland)	Piedmont	Decisive victory
48.	24 September 1799	Battle of the Gotthard Pass	Open Battle	Swiss campaign	(French First Republic)	Saint-Gotthard Massif	Victory
49.	24 September 1799	Combat of Hospital / Hospental	Open Battle	Swiss campaign	(French First Republic)	Canton of Waldstätten	Victory
50.	24 September 1799	Battle of Oberalpsee / the Oberalp Pass	Open Battle	Swiss campaign	(French First Republic)	Canton of Waldstätten; Canton of Raetia	Victory
51.	25 September 1799	Combat of the Urnerloch	Open Battle	Swiss campaign	(French First Republic)	Canton of Waldstätten	Victory
52.	25 September 1799	Battle of the Devil's Bridge	Open Battle	Swiss campaign	(French First Republic)	Canton of Waldstätten	Victory
53.	30 September – 1 October 1799	Battle of the Klöntal	Open Battle	Swiss campaign	(French First Republic)	Canton of Linth	Victory
54.	30 September – 1 October 1799	Battle of the Muttental	Open Battle	Swiss campaign	(French First Republic)	Canton of Waldstätten	Decisive victory
55.	1 October 1799	Battle of Glarus	Open Battle; Storming Fortifications (Note: Battle of Glarus (1799)#According to Milyutin)	Swiss campaign	(French First Republic) (Helvetic Republic)	Canton of Linth	Disputed

== Progeny and titles ==
=== Honours ===
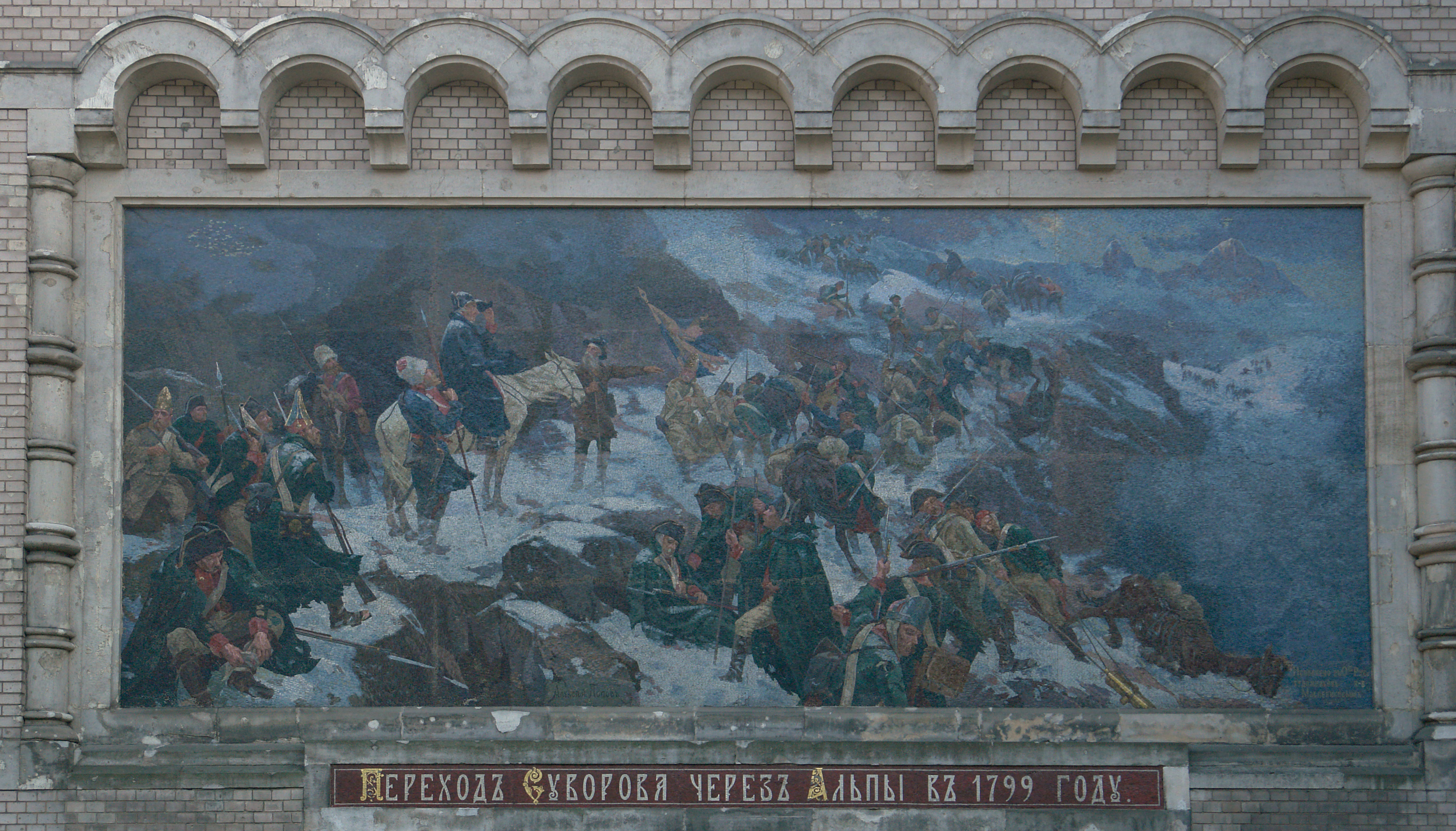
Mosaic Suvorov's Crossing the Alps in 1799 on the Suvorov Museum facade. By N. E. Maslennikov

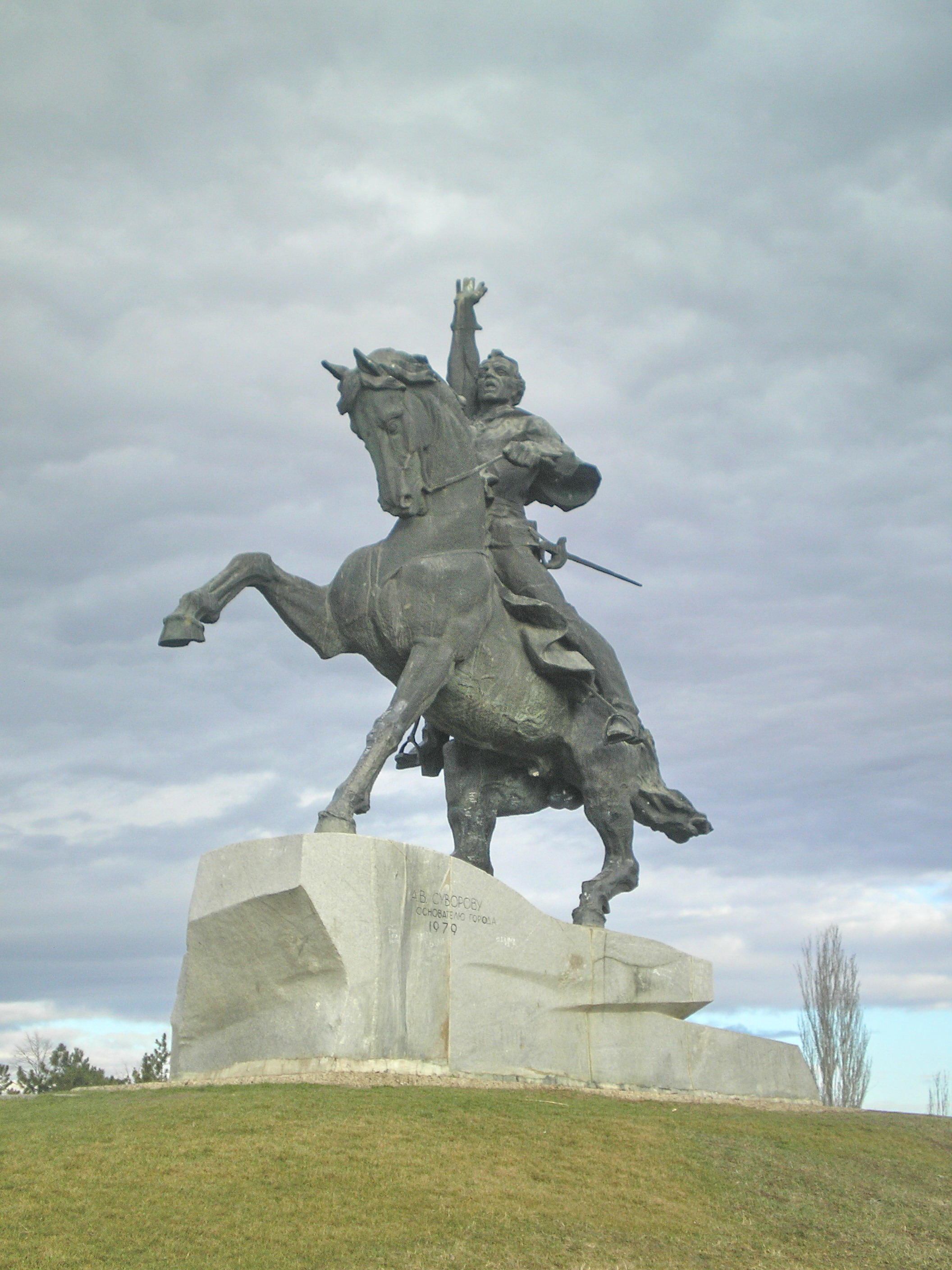
In 1792, Suvorov founded Tiraspol, today the capital city of Transnistria. An equestrian statue of Suvorov stands in Suvorov Square, the central square of the city.

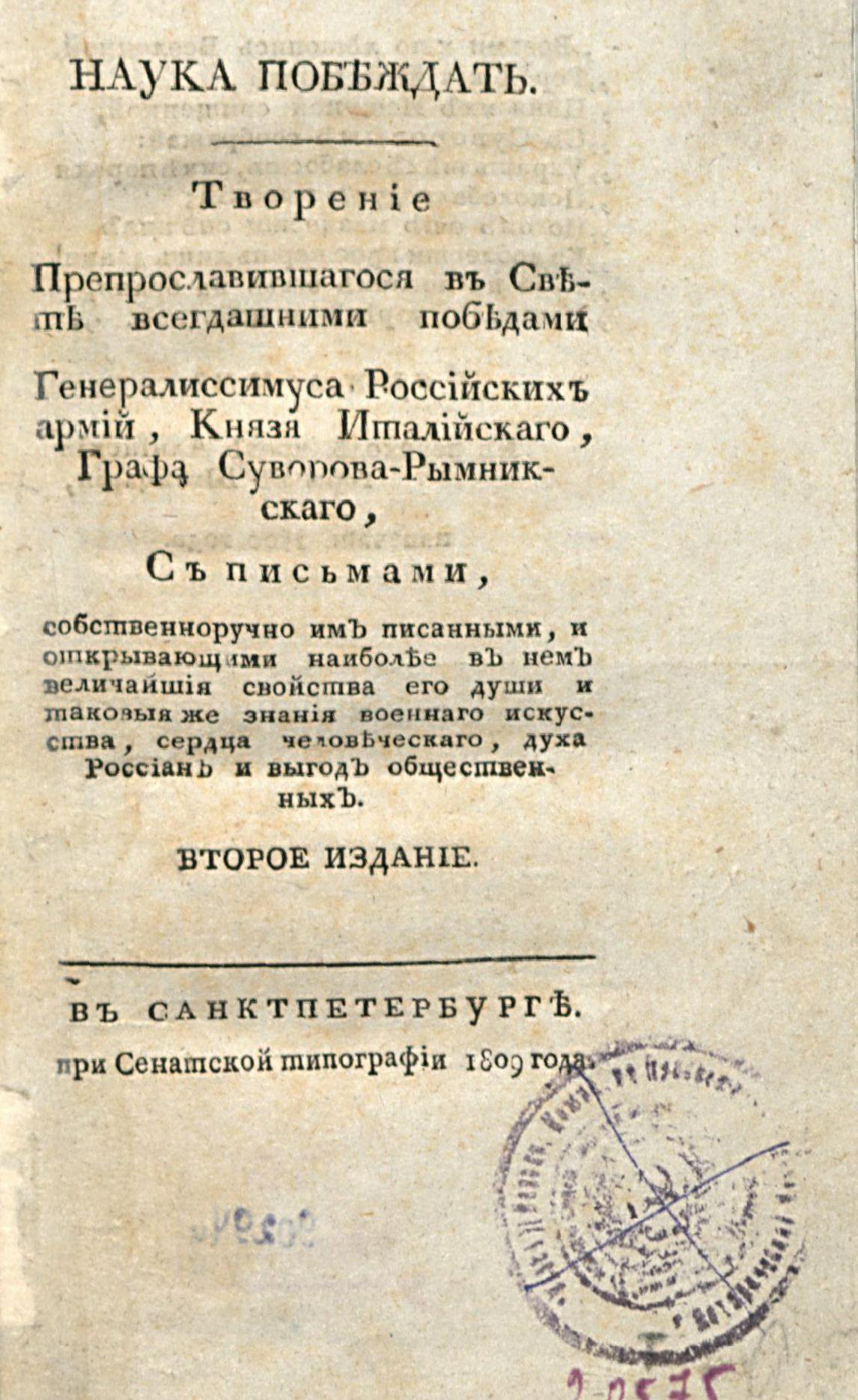
Suvorov. The Science of Victory/Winning. Title page of the 2nd ed., 1809.

Suvorov's full name, titles (according to Russian pronunciation) and ranks are the following: "Aleksandr Vasilyevich Suvorov, Prince of Italy, Count of the Rymnik, Count of the Holy Roman Empire, Prince of Sardinia, Generalissimus of Russia's Ground and Naval Forces, Marshal of the Austrian and Sardinian Armies, Grandee of the Spanish Crown"; seriously wounded six times, he was the recipient of various honors, many of which are listed below.

Medals

- Order of Saint Andrew, the Apostle First-Called (09.11.1787, for the victory at Kinburn) + the diamond insignia of this order (03.11.1789, for the victory at Focsani);
- Order of Saint George, the Victory-bearer
  - First Class (18.10.1789, for the victory at Rymnik),
  - Second Class (30.07.1773, for the victories at Turtukaya),
  - Third Class (19.08.1771, for the victories during the war of the Bar Confederation in 1770 & 1771);
- Order of Saint Vladimir First Class (28.07.1783, "for the accession of various Zakuban peoples to the All-Russian Empire");
- Order of Saint Alexander Nevsky (20.12.1771, for the victory at Stołowicze) + the star of this order with diamonds "from Her Imperial Majesty's own clothes" (24.12.1780);
- Order of Saint Anna First Class (30.09.1770, for the victory at Orzechowo);
- Order of Saint John of Jerusalem and Grand Commander's Cross (13.02.1799);
- Order of the Black Eagle (07.12.1794) & Order of the Red Eagle (07.12.1794) – Prussia;
- Supreme Order of the Most Holy Annunciation with Grand Cross (23.06.1799) & Order of Saints Maurice and Lazarus with Grand Cross (23.06.1799) – Sardinia;
- Military Order of Maria Theresa First Class and Grand Cross (12.10.1799) – Austria;
- Order of Saint Hubert (21.01.1800) – Bavaria;
- Royal Military and Hospitaller Order of Our Lady of Mount Carmel and Saint Lazarus of Jerusalem united (13.02.1800, from the exiled titular King Louis XVIII) – France.

Weapons

- Golden Weapon for Bravery with diamonds (29.07.1775, while celebrating peace with the Ottoman Empire in 1775);
- Golden Weapon for Bravery with diamonds and the inscription "To the victor of the Vizier" (26.09.1789, for the victory at Rymnik).

Other honours

- Gold snuff box with the portrait of Empress Catherine II (1778, for forcing the Ottoman squadron out of the Akhtiar harbour);
- Gold coin (05.11.1784, for the joining Crimea and Taman to Russia in 1783);
- Gold snuff box with the monogram of Empress Catherine II, decorated with diamonds (06.1787);
- Diamond feather to the tricorne with the letter "K", meaning Kinburn (26 [15] April 1789);
- Gold snuff box with the monogram of the Austrian Emperor Joseph II, decorated with diamonds (13.08.1789, for the victory at Rymnik);
- Decision on the establishment of a medal in honour of A. V. Suvorov (25.03.1791, for the capture of Izmail; analogous medal was established on 02.03.1994);
- The Senate was ordered to compile a letter of commendation with a list of Suvorov's exploits (25.03.1791);
- Diamond epaulettes and ring (02.09.1793, for strengthening the southern borders of Russia);
- Certificate of Appreciation (02.09.1793);
- As a demonstration of the Emperor's confidence, the Order of St. George of the 3rd degree is entrusted to be conferred on the worthiest of Suvorov's choice (02.09.1793);
- Diamond bow to the hat (26.10.1794, for victories at Krupczyce and Brest);
- Three guns from among those captured from Polish insurgents (26.10.1794, for victories at Krupczyce and Brest);
- Gold snuff box from the Warsaw magistrate with the inscription "Warsaw to its deliverer, day 4 November 1794" (15.11.1794, a gift, as only monarchs had the right to award);
- Portrait of the Austrian Emperor Francis II, decorated with diamonds (25.12.1794);
- The Senate was ordered to compose a letter of commendation outlining the merits of A. V. Suvorov in the Polish Campaign (01.01.1795);
- Ring with the portrait of Emperor Paul I (14.05.1799);
- Portrait of Emperor Paul I to wear on the chest (13.07.1799).

Often found in the literature references to the awarding of Suvorov with the Polish Orders of the White Eagle and Saint Stanislaus, the Prussian Pour le Mérite, the Neapolitan Order of Saint Januarius and the Bavarian "Order of the Golden Lion" (perhaps referring to the Order of the Palatine Lion) do not correspond to reality.

=== Progeny ===
27 (16 OS) January 1774, Suvorov was married to Varvara Ivanovna Prozorovskaya of the Prozorovsky and Golitsyn noble families, and had a son Arkadi Suvorov and daughter Natalya Suvorova (in marriage Zubova), but his family life was not happy and he had an unpleasant relationship with his wife due to her infidelity. Suvorov's son, Arkadi Suvorov (1783–1811) served as a general officer in the Russian army during the Napoleonic and Ottoman wars of the early 19th century, and drowned in the same river Rymnik in 1811 that had brought his father so much fame. The drowning of his son in the river is supported by Aleksey Yermolov's memoirs, as well as by the military historian Christopher Duffy. His grandson Alexander Arkadievich (1804–1882) served as Governor General of Riga in 1848–61 and Saint Petersburg in 1861–66. Suvorov's daughter Natalya Alexandrovna (1775–1844) known under her name Suvorochka married Count Nikolay Zubov.

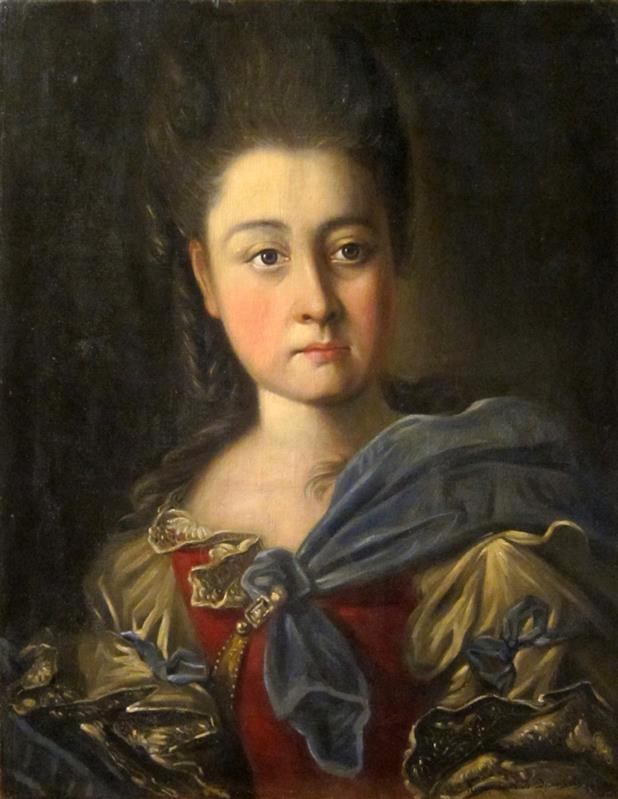
Varvara Ivanovna, wife

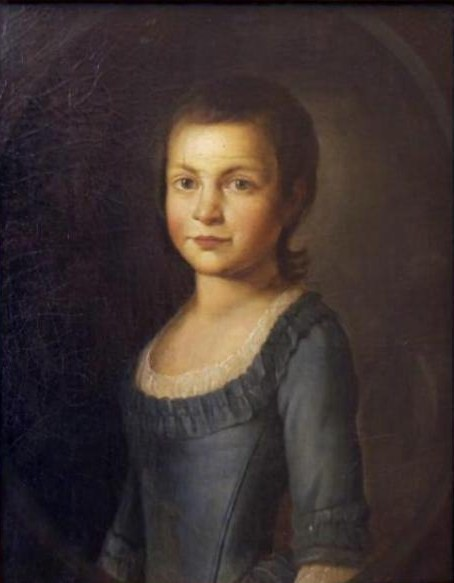
Natalya, daughter

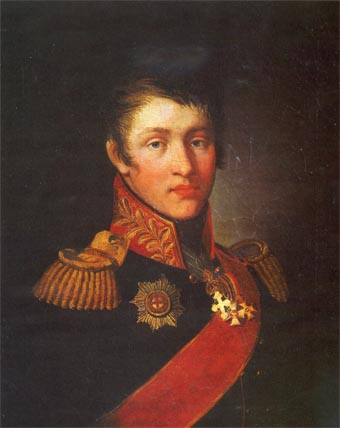
Arkady, son

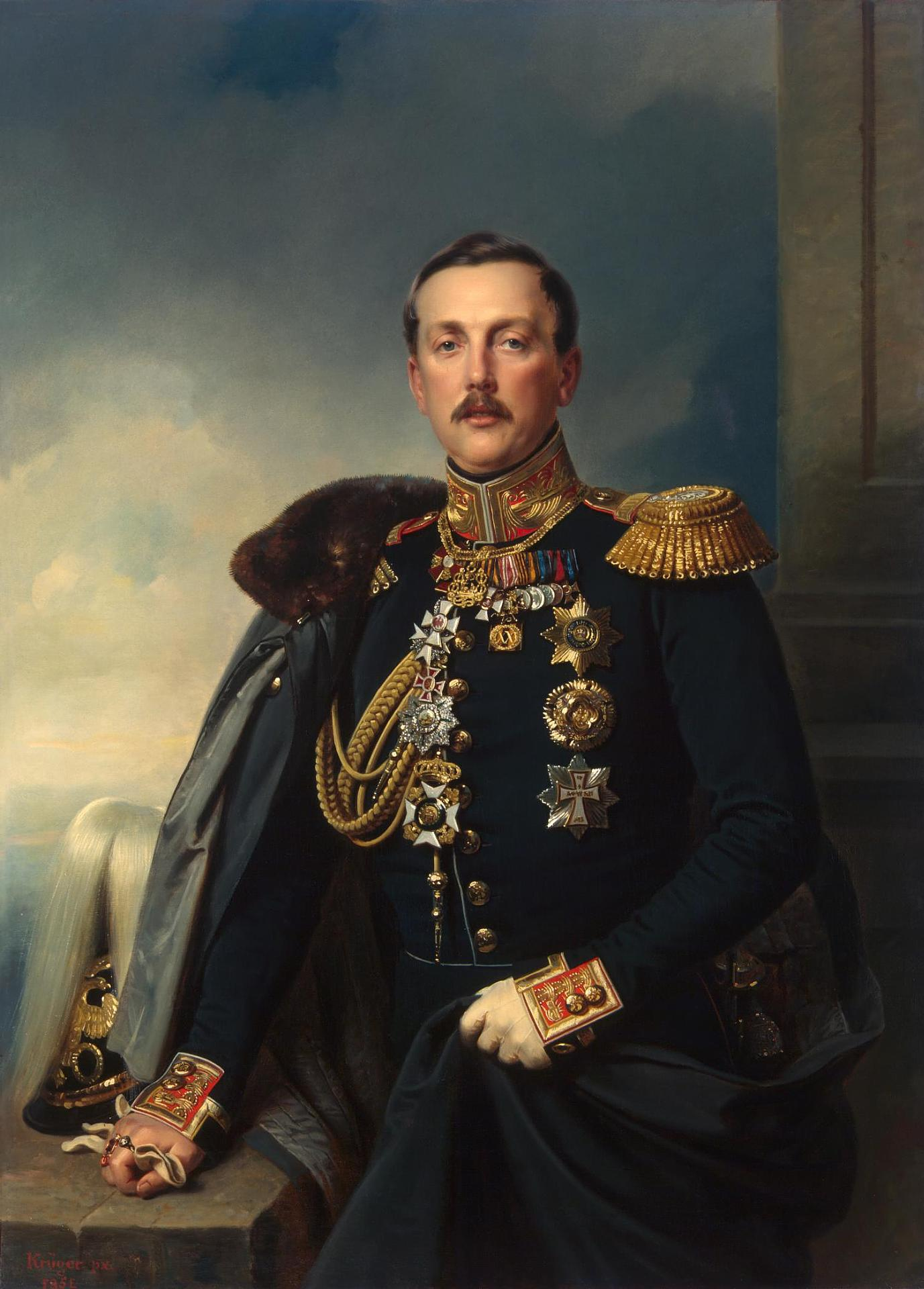
Alexander, grandson

== Character ==
Suvorov was one of the best-educated Russians of his time. He was well versed in mathematics, history and geography; spoke German, French, Italian, Polish, Turkish, Arabic and Finnish; he also had a thorough knowledge of philosophy, ancient and modern literature. His military erudition was impressive. He had studied all the important military works from Plutarch down to his own contemporaries, mastered the science of fortification and had also passed a naval qualifying examination.

Contrary to the belief that Suvorov was short, academic Vladimir Medinsky stated that Suvorov measured at 177 cm, taller than the average soldier.

== Political views ==
His political views were centered around enlightened monarchy. However, Suvorov had no interest in pursuing politics and made his disdain for the court lifestyle and tendencies of aristocrats well known: he lacked diplomacy in his dispatches, and his sarcasm triggered enmity among some courtiers. He joked with the men, calling common soldiers "brother" and shrewdly presented the results of detailed planning and careful strategy as the work of inspiration.

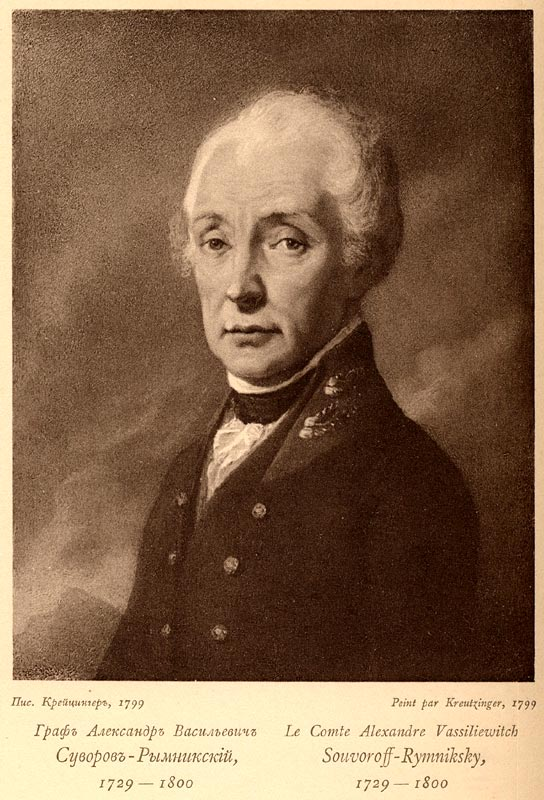
Graf Aleksandr Vasil'evich Suvorov-Rymnikskiy by Joseph Kreutzinger

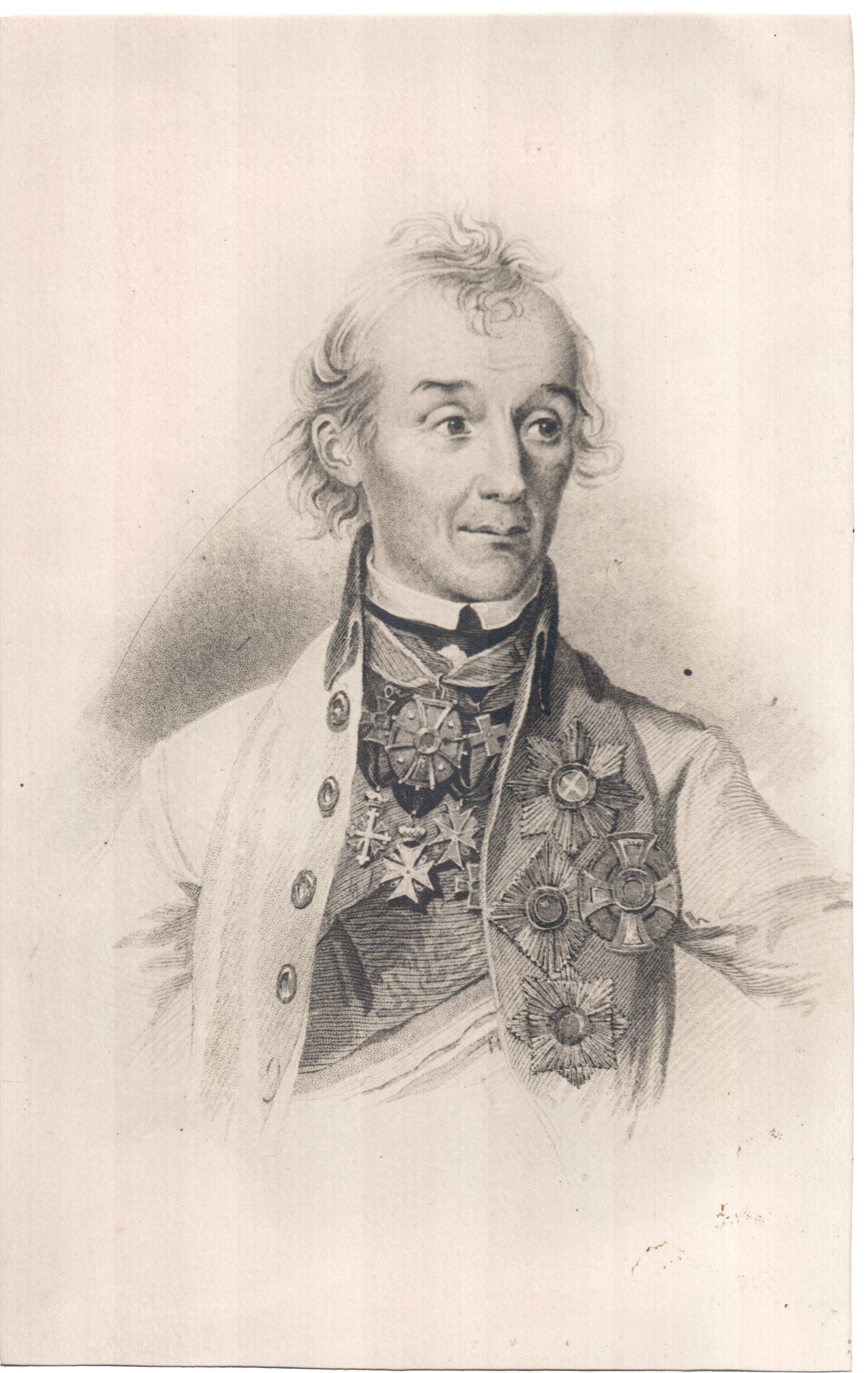
Suvorov by John Charles Robinson from a drawing by Taras Shevchenko

== Assessment ==
=== Suvorov's art of war ===
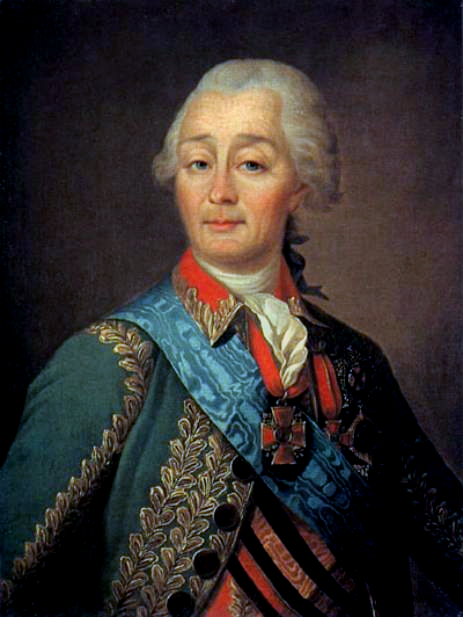
Alexander V. Suvorov, end of XIX century.

Suvorov won despite being outnumbered in almost all of his battles, defeating many of the best commanders of the time period, those being André Masséna, Étienne Macdonald, and Jean Victor Marie Moreau of France, and Koca Yusuf Pasha, Cenaze Hasan Pasha, and Aydoslu Mehmed Pasha of the Ottoman Empire. Notably, Suvorov defeated the French Revolutionary Army multiple times, which was regarded as the best in the world, and Masséna, arguably the best French Revolutionary general, who had superior forces in terms of experience, morale, and numbers.

Moreau ultimately ranked Suvorov alongside Napoleon, while also describing Suvorov's victory at Trebbia as "the height of the art of war", while writer Eugen Binder von Krieglstein ranked Suvorov as one of the greatest commanders of all time, alongside Napoleon and Frederick the Great. Renowned military officer and theorist Antoine-Henri Jomini called Suvorov "the true genius of war". Naval officer John Paul Jones, referred to as the "Father of the American Navy", labeled Suvorov the "greatest warrior" and ranked him alongside Alexander the Great, Hannibal, Caesar, Gustavus Adolphus and Frederick the Great. The British historian Simon Sebag Montefiore called Suvorov Russia's most brilliant general and ranked him as one of the modern military geniuses, along with Napoleon and Frederick the Great.

In 1799, Napoleon himself warned the Directory that they would not be able to stop Suvorov unless they found generals with "special skill in fighting him". In 1807, Macdonald declared to the Russian ambassador at a reception with Napoleon and a crowd around that "This crew would never have seen the Tuileries if you had had a second Suvorov".

While on a campaign, he reportedly lived as a private soldier, sleeping on straw and contenting himself with the humblest fare. Suvorov saw victory as dependent on the morale, training, and initiative of the front-line soldier. In battle he emphasized speed and mobility, accuracy of gunfire and the use of the bayonet, as well as detailed planning and careful strategy. His motto: coup d'oeil (glazomer), speed (bystrota), impetus (natisk). He abandoned traditional drills, and communicated with his troops in clear and understandable ways. Suvorov also took great care of his army's supplies – what could not be done in Switzerland due to the Habsburg indifference to his army (see § The march to Switzerland) – and living conditions, reducing cases of illness among his soldiers dramatically, and earning their loyalty and affection. A master of logistics, Suvorov ordered his officers, quartermasters and doctors to keep the welfare and fitness of the troops in the forefront of their attentions. He severely punished, often with courts-martial, any officers who senselessly or cruelly drilled their troops or who failed to maintain his high sanitary and health standards. Although a strict disciplinarian, he took extenuating circumstances into account. Once a soldier or officer had been punished or reprimanded, Suvorov would do his utmost to rehabilitate him.

Suvorov "did not know retreat", he constantly acted offensively and in accordance with the situation was looking for a fight, not evaded it, but he did not overuse the battles, the fight always turned out to be appropriate, necessary in the operation, and moreover decisive; if he got the chance to confront his enemy, he used it with all the energy. Suvorov's guiding principle was to detect the weakest point of an enemy and focus an attack upon that area. He would send forth his units in small groups as they arrived on the battlefield to sustain momentum. Suvorov used aimed fire instead of repeated barrages from line infantry and applied light infantrymen as skirmishers and sharpshooters. He used a variety of army sizes and types of formations against different foes: squares against the Turks, lines against Poles, and columns against the French.

Suvorov believed that "a military man must know the languages of the nations with whom he is fighting," so he developed a fluent command of French, German, Greek, Ottoman Turkish, Italian, Polish and Latin, as well as some knowledge of Arabic, Finnish and Persian. He also rejected a suggestion that the Russian army rid itself of its musicians, saying,

"music doubles, trebles the force of an army."

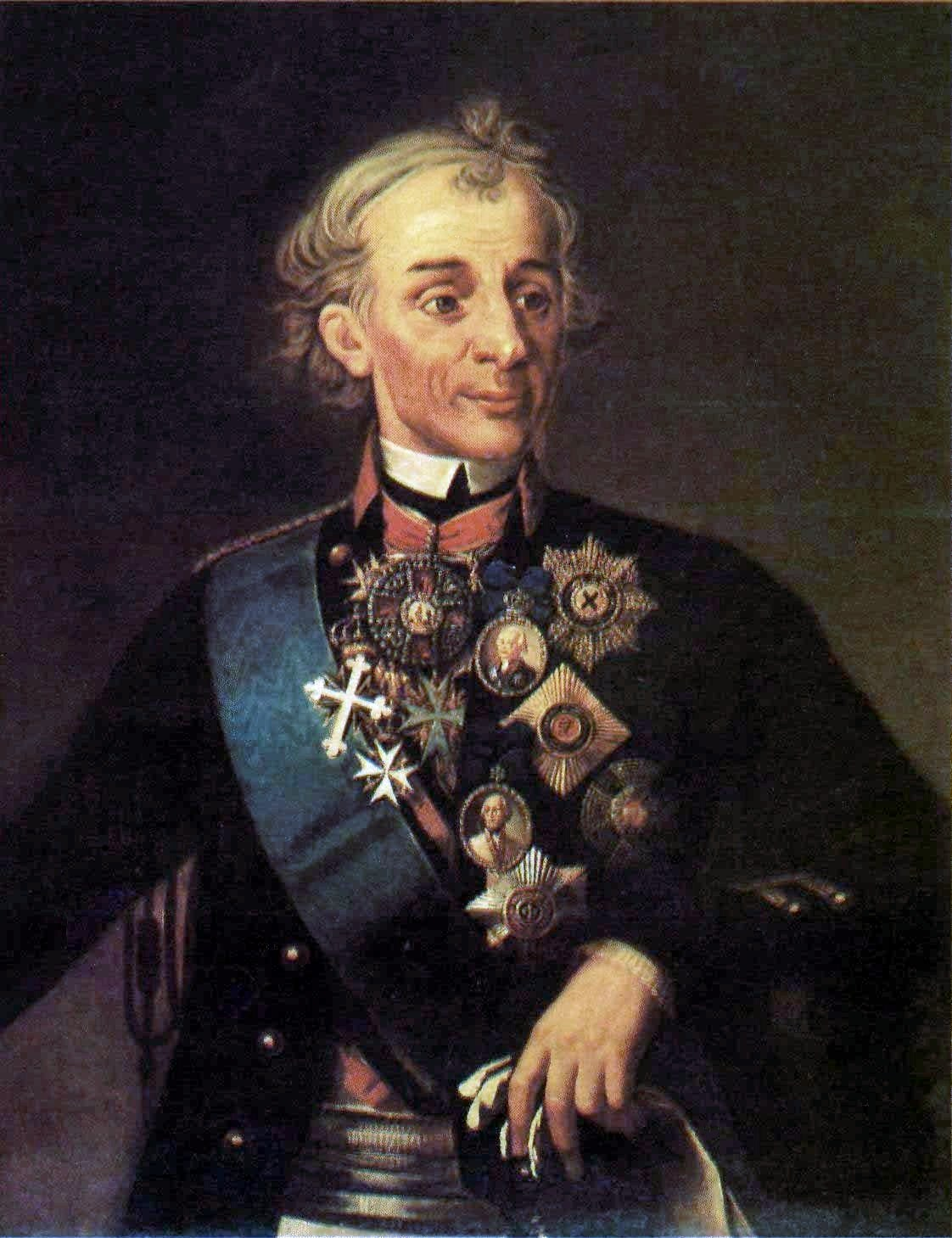
Alexander V. Suvorov by George Dawe, painted no later than 1830.

According to D. S. Mirsky, Suvorov "gave much attention to the form of his correspondence, and especially of his orders of the day. These latter are highly original, deliberately aiming at unexpected and striking effects. Their style is a succession of nervous staccato sentences, which produce the effect of blow and flashes. Suvorov's official reports often assume a memorable and striking form. His writings are as different from the common run of classical prose as his tactics were from those of Frederick or Marlborough".

Mikhail Ivanovich Dragomirov declared that he based his teaching on Suvorov's practice, which he held as representative of the fundamental truths of war and of the military qualities of the Russian nation.

Suvorov's maneuvering of the Alps led him to be called the "Russian Hannibal", and was also referred to as the "Russian Mars" and "God of War". The French king, Louis XVIII, compared Suvorov to Attila.

=== Suvorov and Napoleon ===
Suvorov considered Hannibal, Alexander the Great, Julius Caesar, and Napoleon Bonaparte to be the greatest military commanders of all time. Suvorov is seen as having anticipated Napoleon's tactics, and is regarded as being on par with him in terms of military genius. Like Napoleon, Suvorov believed that opportunities in battle are created by fortune but exploited by intelligence, experience and an intuitive vision. To Suvorov, mastery of the art and science of war was not, therefore, purely instinctive. Suvorov kept up with events in Europe by subscribing to foreign newspapers and journals. He had written to one of his nephews in 1796:

"That young Bonaparte, how he moves! He is a hero, a giant, a magician. He overcomes nature and he overcomes men. He turned the Alps (Note: Tyrolean Alps, during his 1796–1797 campaign.) as if they did not exist; he has hidden their frightful rocks in his pocket, and tucked up his army up the right sleeve of his uniform. The enemy scarcely catches sight of his soldiers before he throws his troops at them like a thunderbolt from Jupiter, spreading terror in all directions, and crushing the scattered bands of Austrians and Piedmontese. My God, how he moves! The first time he assumed command he cut to the heart of tactics like a sword slashing through the Gordian Knot. He disregards the odds against him, he attacks the enemy wherever they are to be found, and he defeats them in detail. He knows that shock is irresistible—and that says it all. His enemies will continue in their old routine, subject to the scribblers in the Cabinet, but as for him, he carries his council of war in his head. His operations are as free as the air he breathes… My conclusion is this. That as long as General Bonaparte keeps his wits about him he will be victorious; he possesses the higher elements of the military art in a happy balance. But if, unfortunately for him, he throws himself into the whirlpool of politics, he will lose the conference of his thoughts and he will be lost."

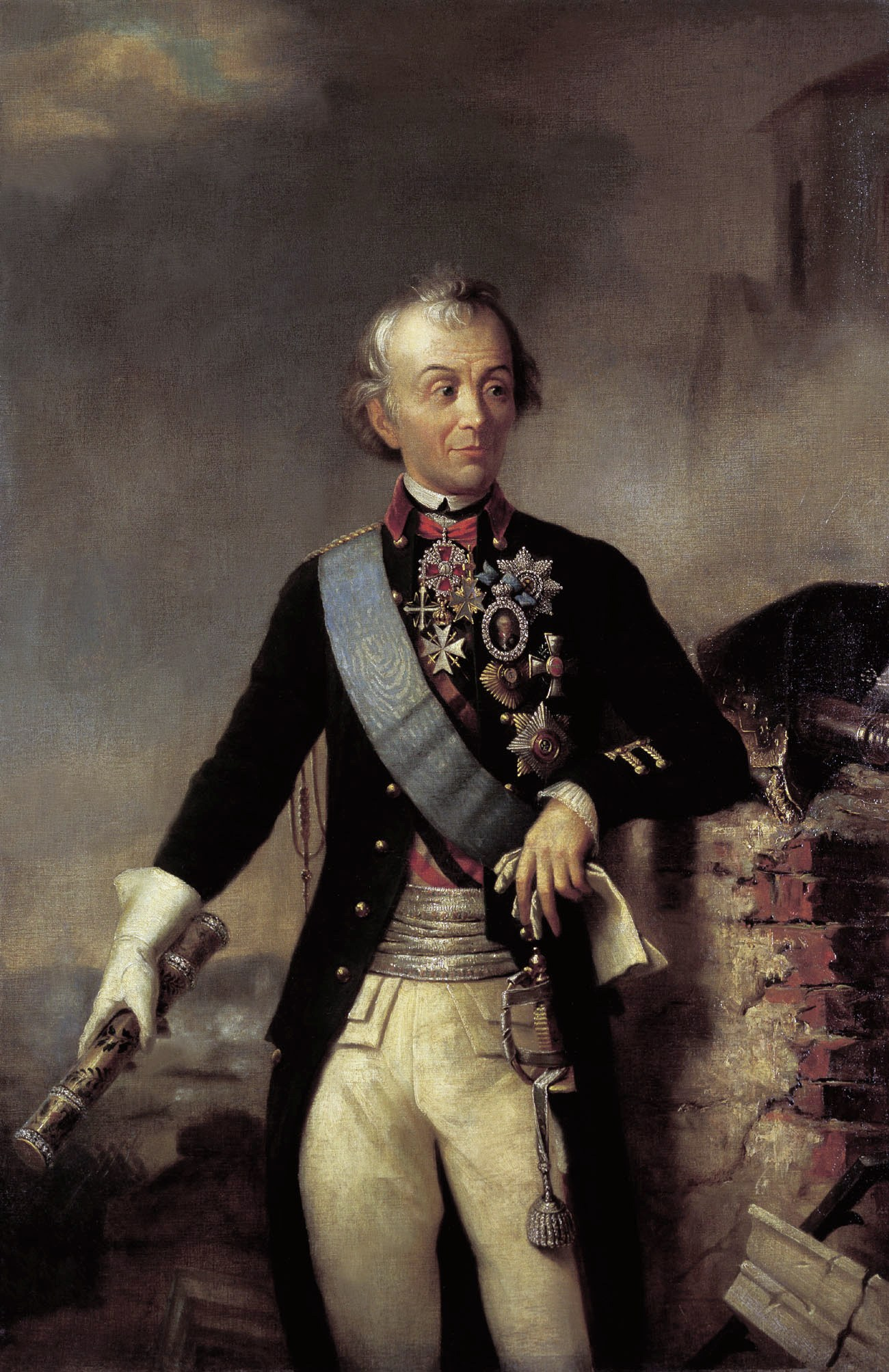
Suvorov with a Field-Marshal's baton (unknown author)

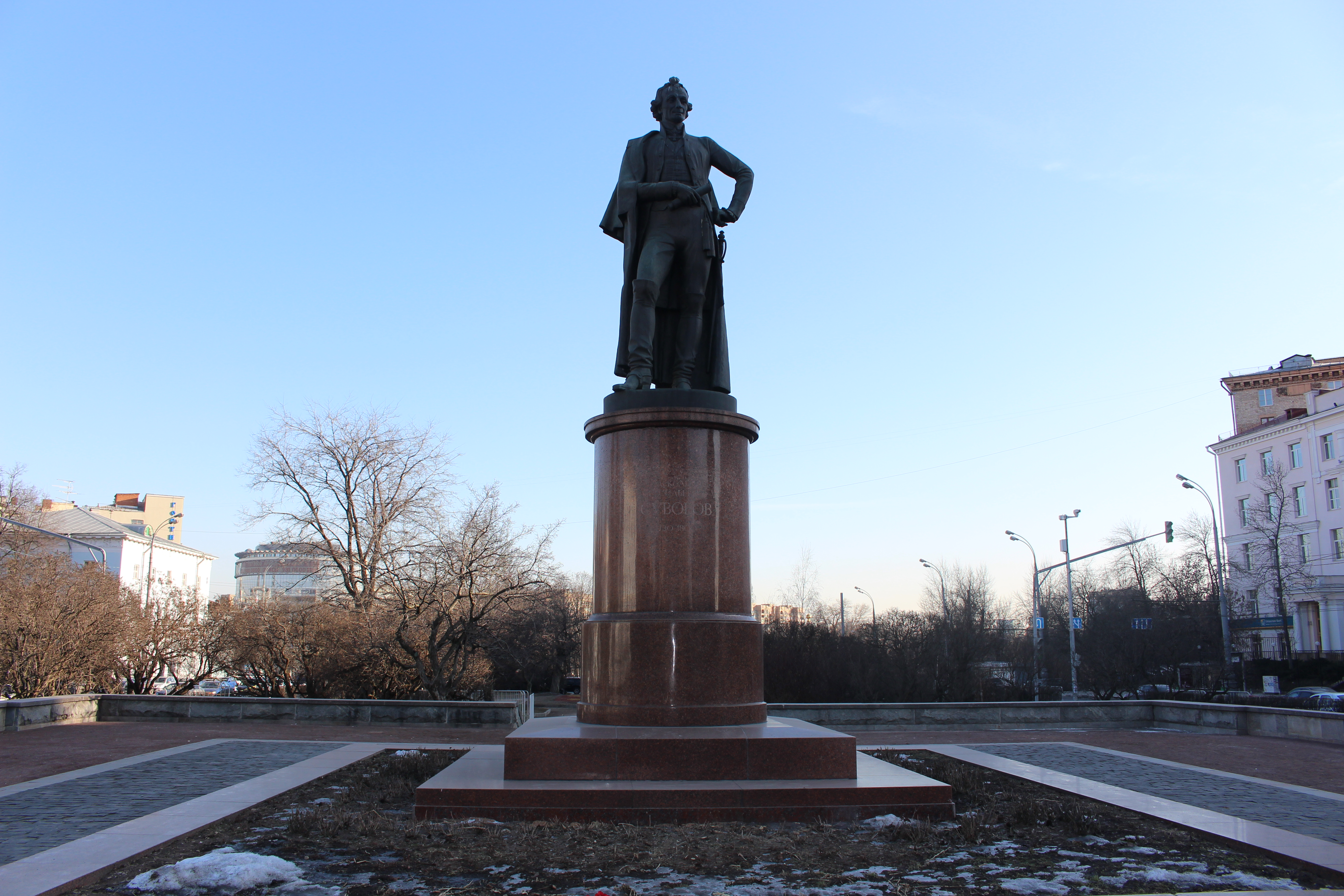
Monument to Suvorov, A. V., in Moscow

Suvorov held Napoleon in high regard, despite not living to see the Napoleonic Wars. However, Napoleon did not reciprocate Suvorov's esteem, assessing Suvorov as having "the soul of a great commander, but not the brains. He was extremely strong willed, he was amazingly active and utterly fearless—but he was as devoid of genius as he was ignorant of the art of war". Despite the two never facing each other, military historians often debate between Suvorov and Napoleon as to who was the superior commander.

== Legacy ==
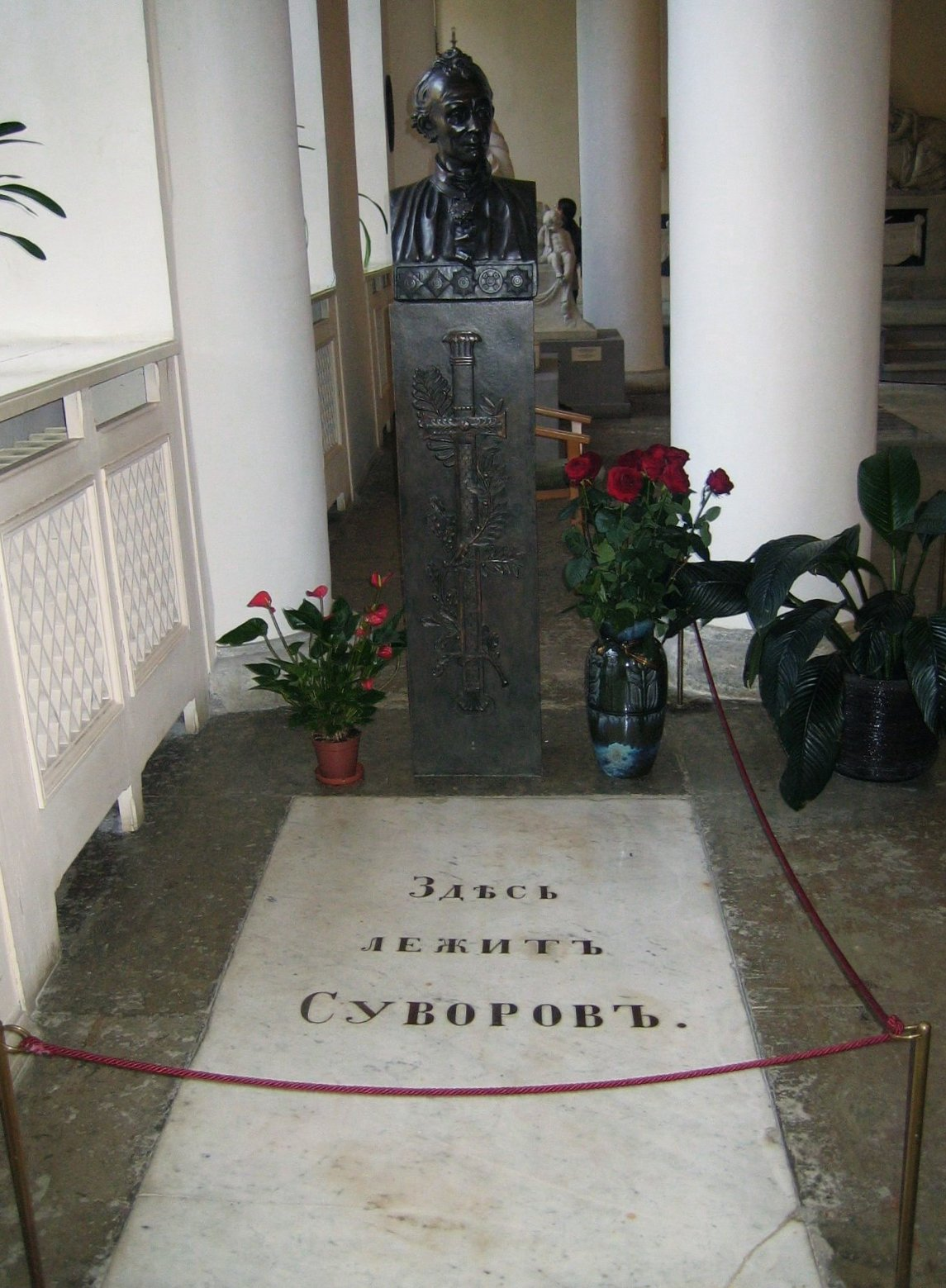
Suvorov's tomb at Alexander Nevsky Lavra in Saint Petersburg

Suvorov was buried in Saint Petersburg in the Alexander Nevsky Lavra. His gravestone states simply: "Here lies Suvorov".

Within a year after his death, Paul I was murdered in his bedroom for his disastrous leadership by a band of dismissed officers and his son and successor Alexander I erected a statue to Suvorov's memory in the Field of Mars.

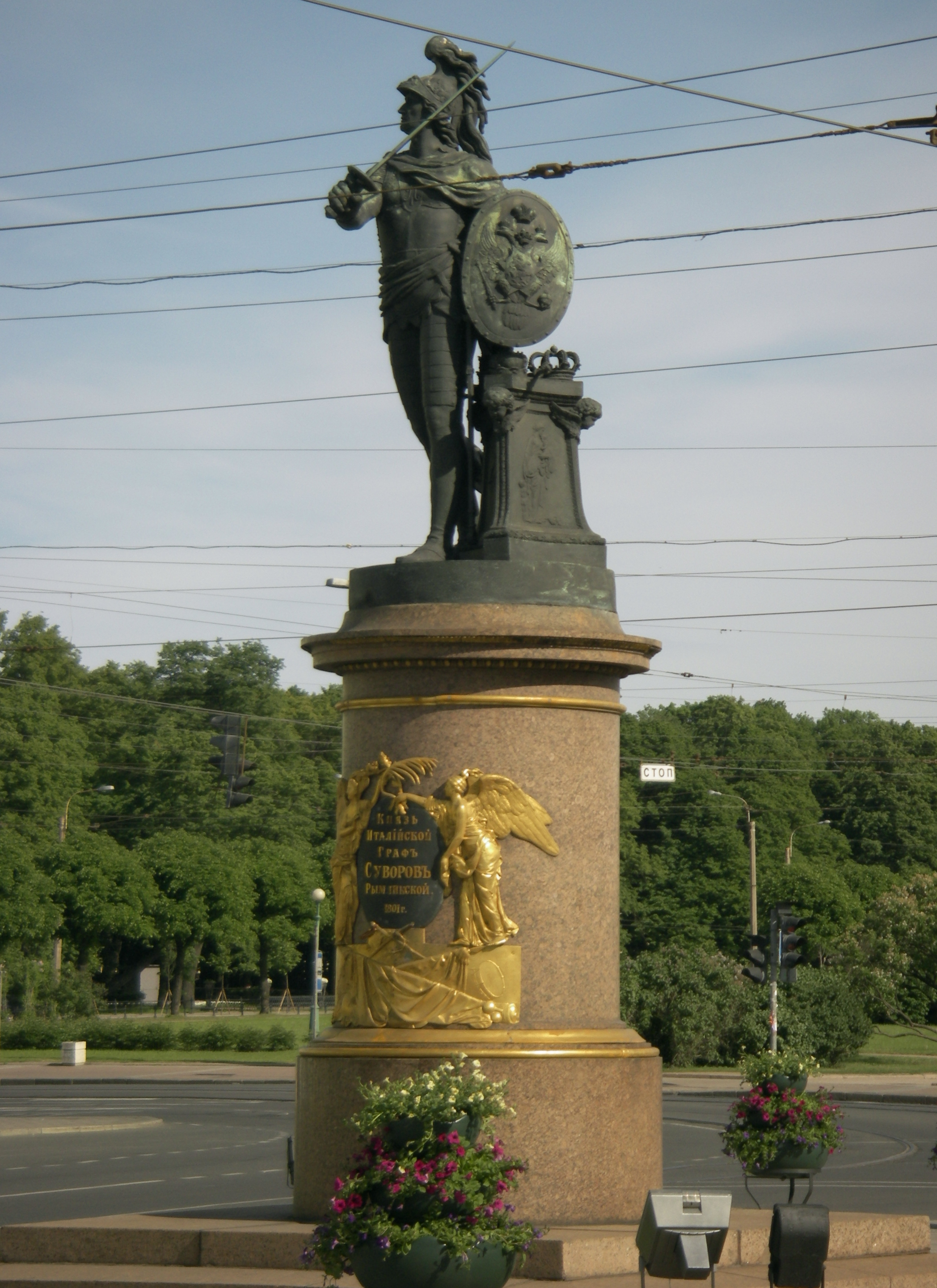
Monument to Suvorov as youthful Mars, the Roman god of war, by Mikhail Kozlovsky in St. Petersburg (1801)

Suvorov's revolutionary methods of waging war endure in his prodigious literary, documentary and epistolary output. He was famed for his military writings, the most well-known being The Science of Victory (The Science of Winning)^{[ru]} and Suzdal Regulations,^{[ru]} and lesser-known works such as Rules for the Kuban and Crimean Corps, Rules for the Conduct of Military Actions in the Mountains (written during his Swiss campaign), and Rules for the Medical Officers. Suvorov was also noted for several of his sayings:

"What is difficult in training will become easy in a battle."

"Perish yourself but rescue your comrade!"

"Fight the enemy with the weapons he lacks."

"One minute can decide the outcome of the battle, one hour — the outcome of the campaign, and one day — the fate of the country."

"He who is afraid is half beaten."

"To me death is better than the defensive."

"A strong pursuit, give no time for the enemy to think, take advantage of victory, uproot him, cut off his escape route."

"When the enemy is driven back, we have failed, and when he is cut off, encircled and dispersed, we have succeeded."

He taught his soldiers to attack instantly and decisively:

"Attack with the cold steel! Push hard with the bayonet!"

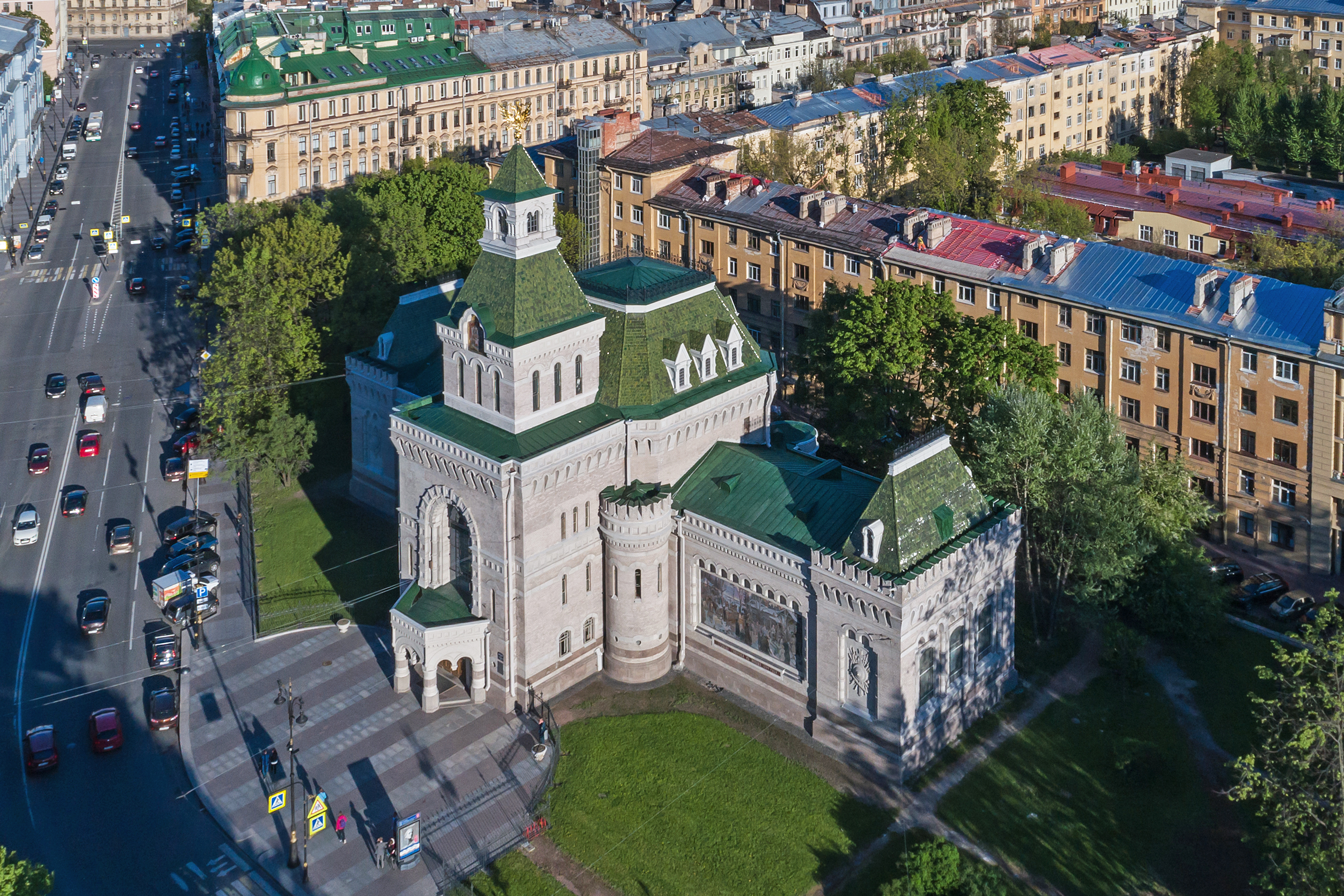
The Suvorov Museum

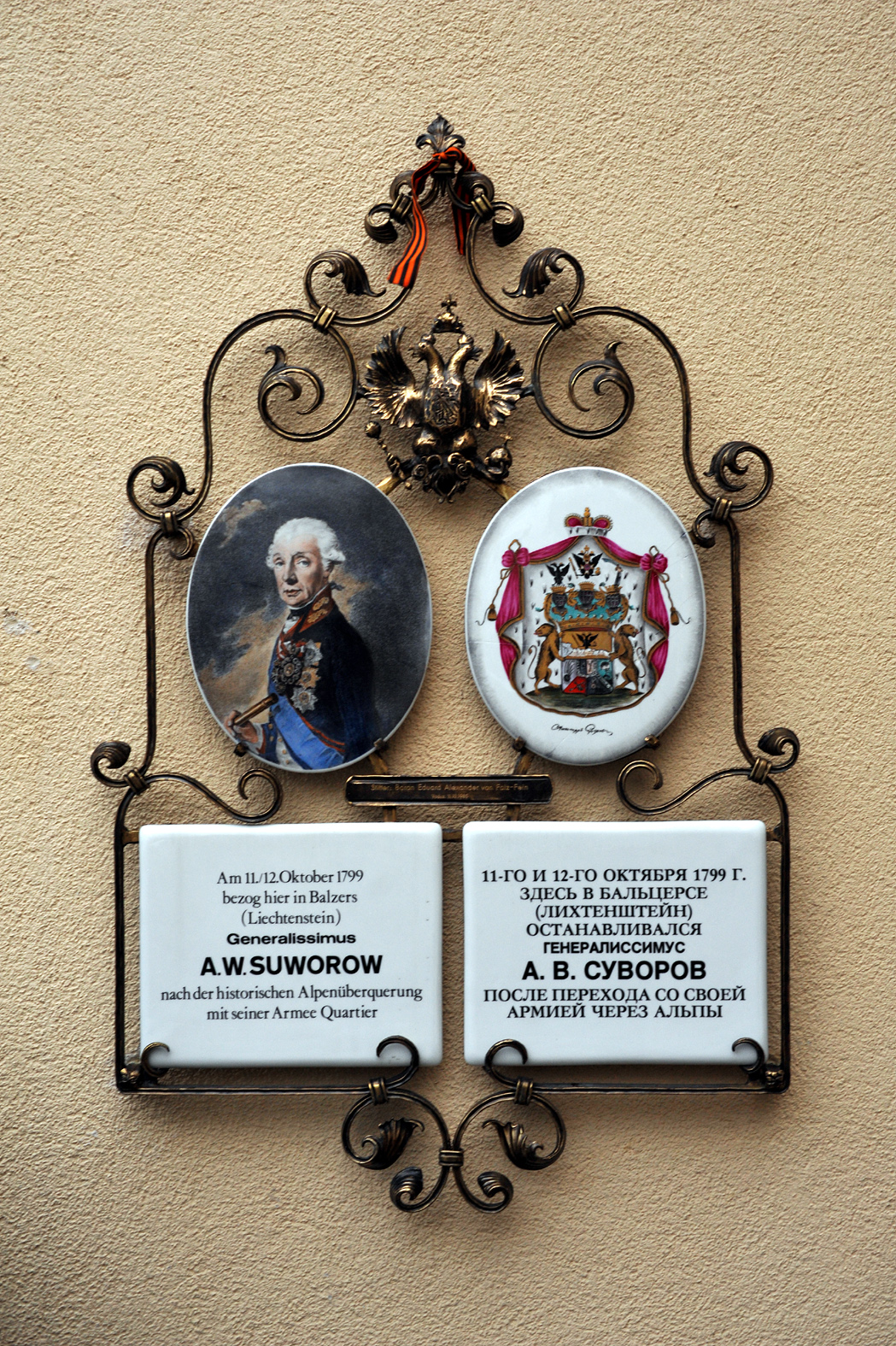
Memorial plaque to the passage of Suvorov's army in October 1799 at the Hotel Hofbalzers in Balzers; Liechtenstein. The plaque is a donation of Baron Eduard Alexandrowitsch von Falz-Fein and has been placed on 11 October 1985.

A "Suvorov school" of generals who had apprenticed under him played a prominent role in the Russian military. Among them was future Field Marshal Mikhail Kutuzov who led the Russian imperial army against Napoleon during the Napoleonic Wars, including the French invasion of Russia. Suvorov, a follower of Peter I the Great and a pupil of Field Marshal Pyotr Alexandrovich Rumyantsev-Zadunaisky, brought up a pleiad of remarkable commanders and military leaders, among whom the most outstanding were, except for Kutuzov, Generals of the Infantry P. I. Bagration, M. A. Miloradovich. On his ideas were brought up Field Marshal D. A. Milyutin, Generals of the Infantry M. I. Dragomirov, M. D. Skobelev, General of the Cavalry A. A. Brusilov, and other famous military figures.

The Suvorov Museum opened in Saint Petersburg in 1900 to commemorate the centenary of the general's death. Apart from in St. Petersburg, other Suvorov museums and monuments have feature in Focșani, Ochakiv(-ov) [1907 (Note: Year when the monument was built.)], Sevastopol [1983], Tulchyn(-in) [1954], Kobryn(-in) [1949; 1950; 1964], Novaya Ladoga [1947], Kherson [1904], Tymanivka or Timanovka [1947; 1950], Simferopol [1984], Kaliningrad [1956], Konchanskoye-Suvorovskoye [1942], Râmnicu Sărat or Rymnik, (Note: Battle of Rymnik § Gallery) Elm and Andermatt which are in the Swiss Alps, etc.

During World War II, the Soviet Union revived the memory of many pre-1917 Russian heroes to raise patriotism. Suvorov was the Tsarist military figure most often referred to by Joseph Stalin, who also received (but did not personally use) the rank of Generalissimo that Suvorov had previously held. The Order of Suvorov was established by the Presidium of the Supreme Soviet on 29 July 1942, and it is still awarded to senior army personnel for exceptional leadership in combat operations against superior enemy forces.

The town of Suvorovo in Varna Province, Bulgaria, was named after Suvorov during the communist period, as was the Russian ship which discovered Suwarrow Island in the Pacific in 1814.

Various currency notes of the Transnistrian ruble depict Suvorov.

There is a Suvorov Square in Tiraspol, Transnistria, named after Alexander Vasilyevich, and another in Saint Petersburg.

His prowess, military wisdom, and daring remain in high regard. Another of his many utterances are well known in the Russian military:

"Achieve victory not by numbers, but by knowing how."

"The bullet is a mad thing; only the bayonet knows what it is about."

"Train hard, fight easy. Train easy and you will have hard fighting."

"Train hard, fight easy" became a Russian proverb.

Alexander Petrushevsky in third volume of his work Generalissimo Prince Suvorov quoted a small song of Russian soldiers about Alexander Suvorov, Pyotr Rumyantsev, and Grigory Potemkin:

Count Rumyantsev-general
Lost a lot of strength.
Thief Potemkin-general
Was never in his own regiment,
He neglected all his strength:
Some of it he drank, some of it he squandered,
Some of it he lost at cards.
And Suvorov-general
Proved his strength,
He loaded a small cannon,
He took the king prisoner.

In Russia, there are 12 secondary-level military schools called Suvorov Military School that were established during the USSR. There is also a military school in Minsk named after Suvorov.

In Soviet times, the 1941 film Suvorov was made (released in the US as General Suvorov).

Russia's former defence minister Sergei Shoigu has proposed that Suvorov be made a saint in the Russian Orthodox Church.

=== Miscellaneous art ===
==== Coins ====
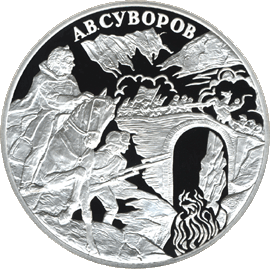
Bank of Russia coin – Series: "Outstanding Russian Military Commanders"; A. V. Suvorov, 3 rubles reverse.

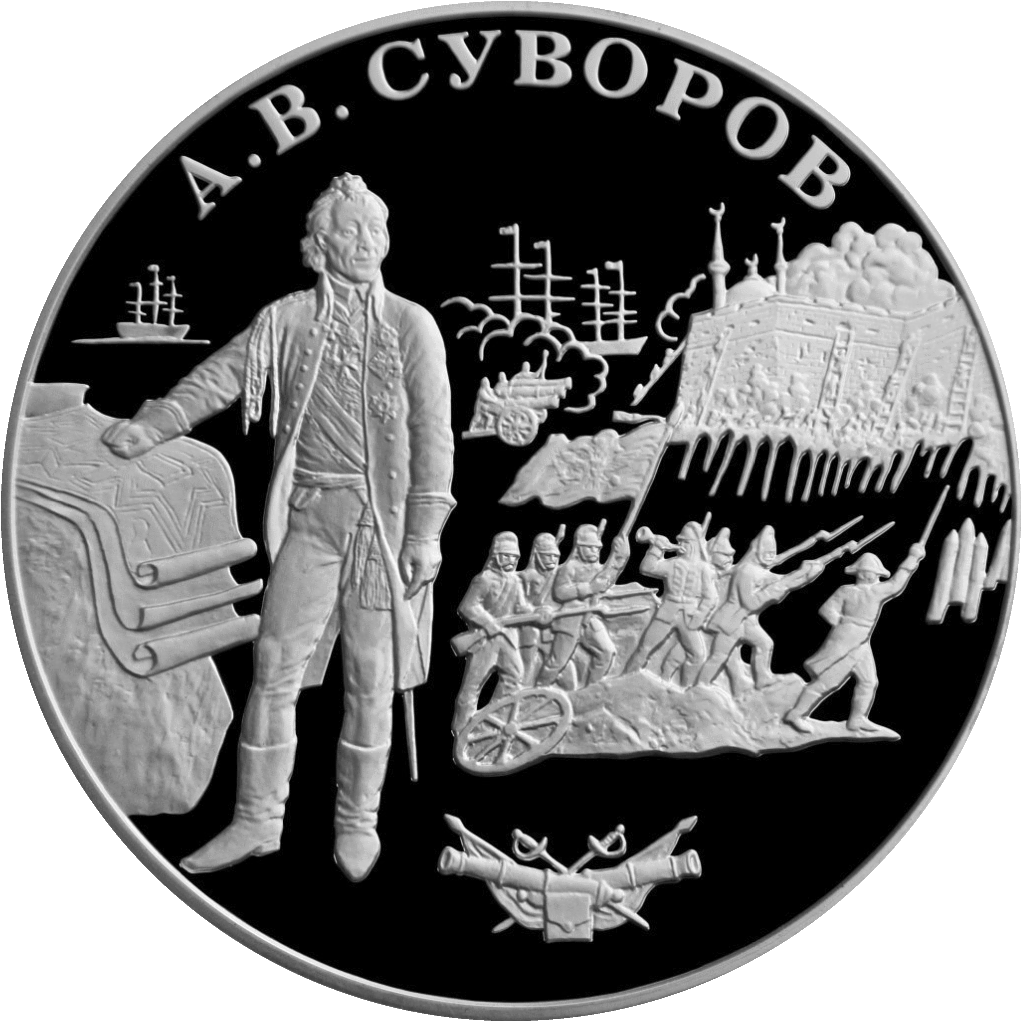
Bank of Russia coin – Series: "Outstanding Russian Military Commanders"; A. V. Suvorov, 25 rubles reverse.

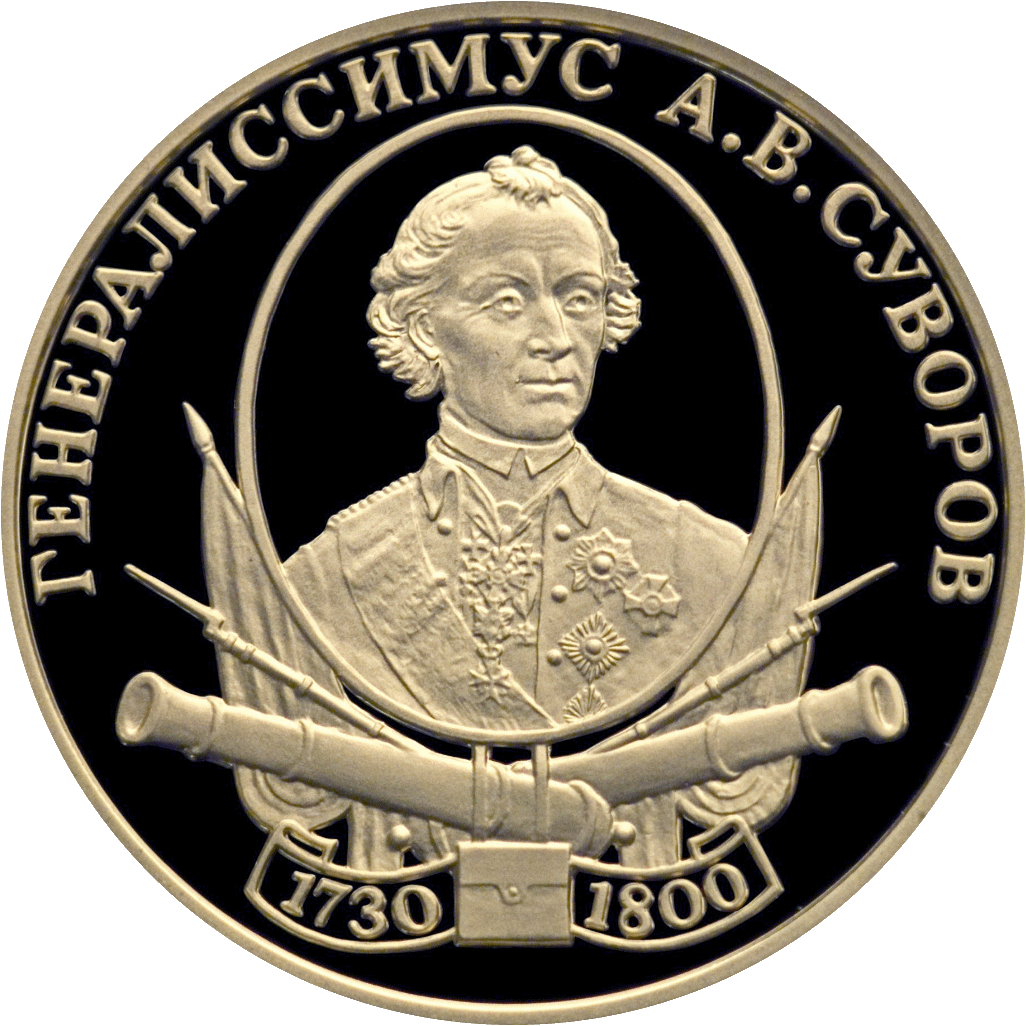
Bank of Russia coin – Series: "Outstanding Russian Military Commanders"; Generalissimo A. V. Suvorov, 50 rubles reverse.

==== Banknotes ====
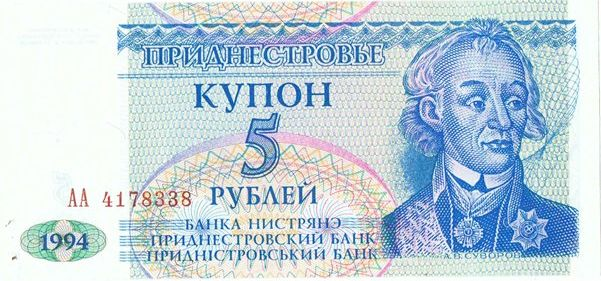
Transnistria
5 Transnistrian rubles
Transnistrian Republican Bank. 1994 series.

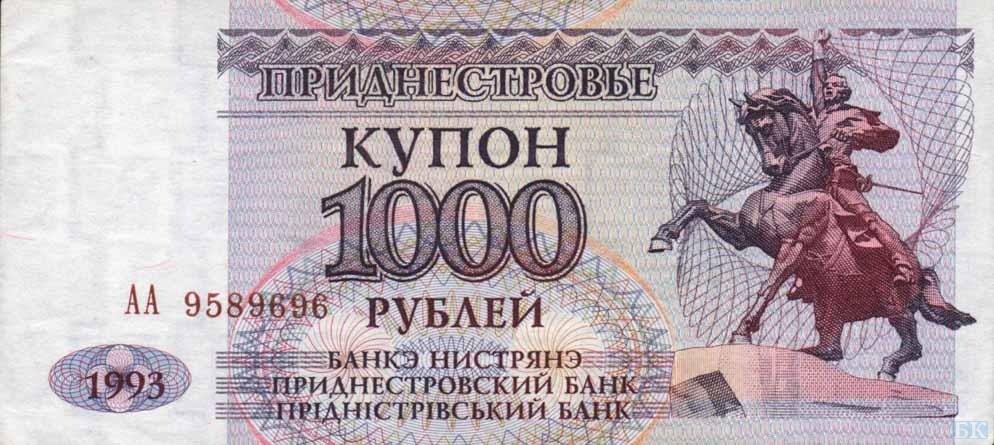
Transnistria
1,000 Transnistrian rubles
Transnistrian Republican Bank. 1993 series.

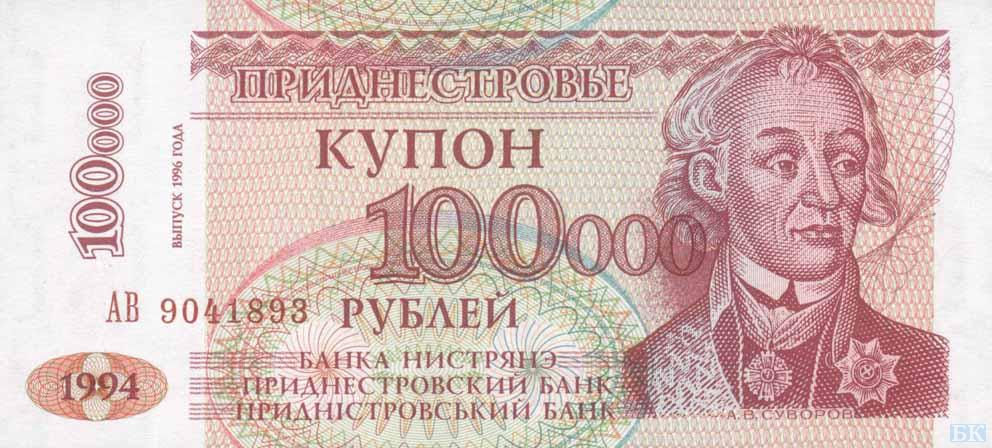
Transnistria
100,000 Transnistrian rubles
Transnistrian Republican Bank. 1994 series.

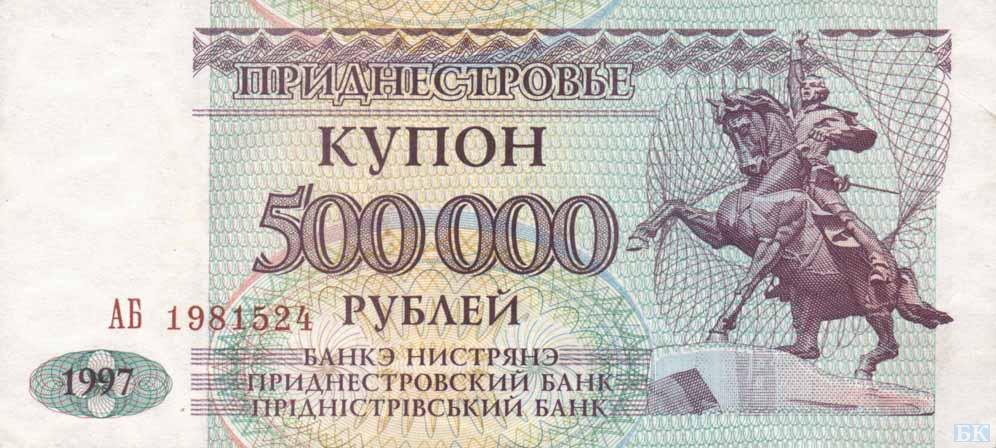
Transnistria
500,000 Transnistrian rubles
Transnistrian Republican Bank. 1997 series.

==== Stamps ====
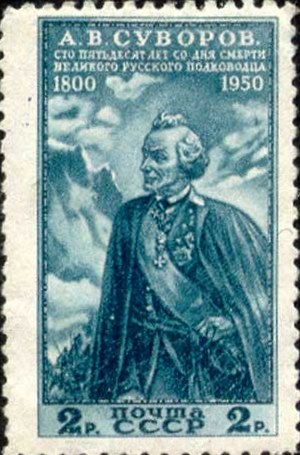
USSR stamp, 2 rubles; 150th anniversary of Suvorov's death; Suvorov in the Alps (artist Nikolay Mikhailovich Avvakumov, 1941, Moscow, Pushkin Museum).

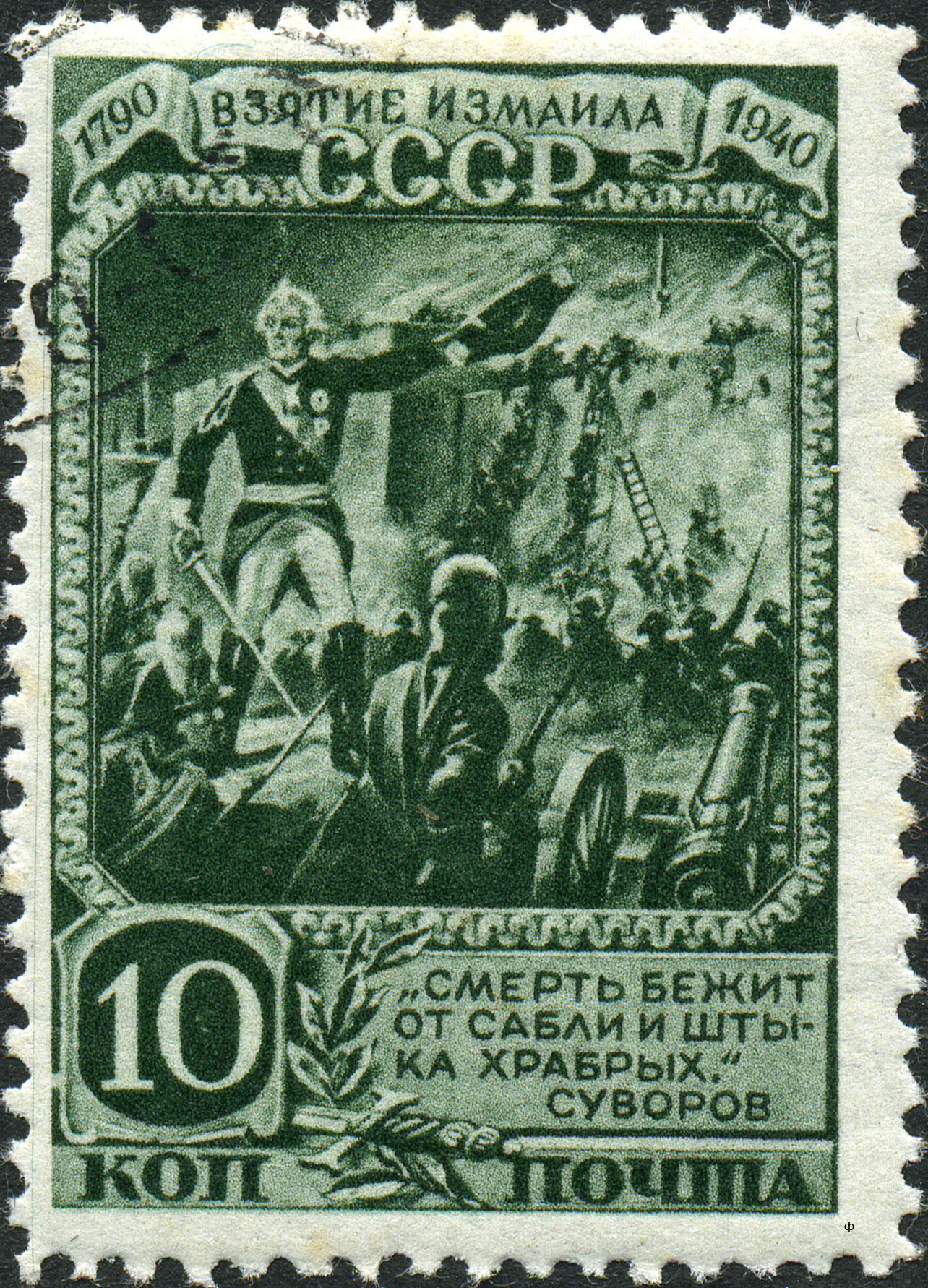
Capture of Izmail. USSR. 10 kopecks. "Death flees the saber and bayonet of the brave." (Alexander Suvorov).

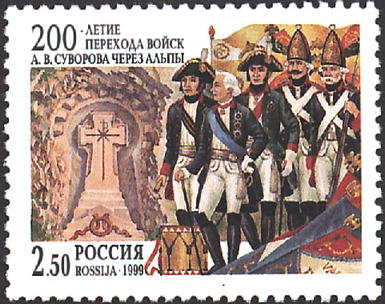
Russian Postage stamp. 200th anniversary of Suvorov's crossing of the Alps. Suvorov with a group of officers and soldiers of the Russian army.

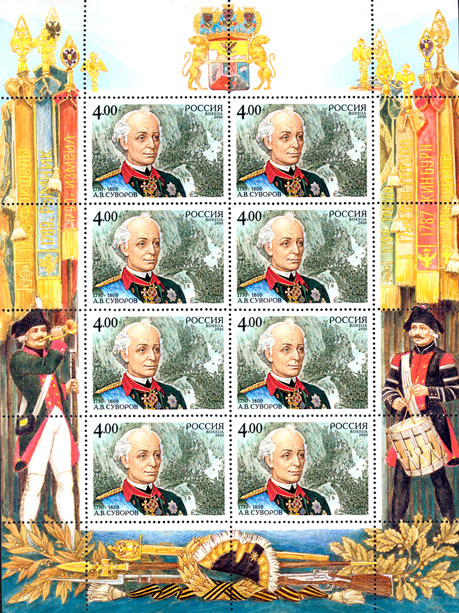
Russian postage stamp, 2005.

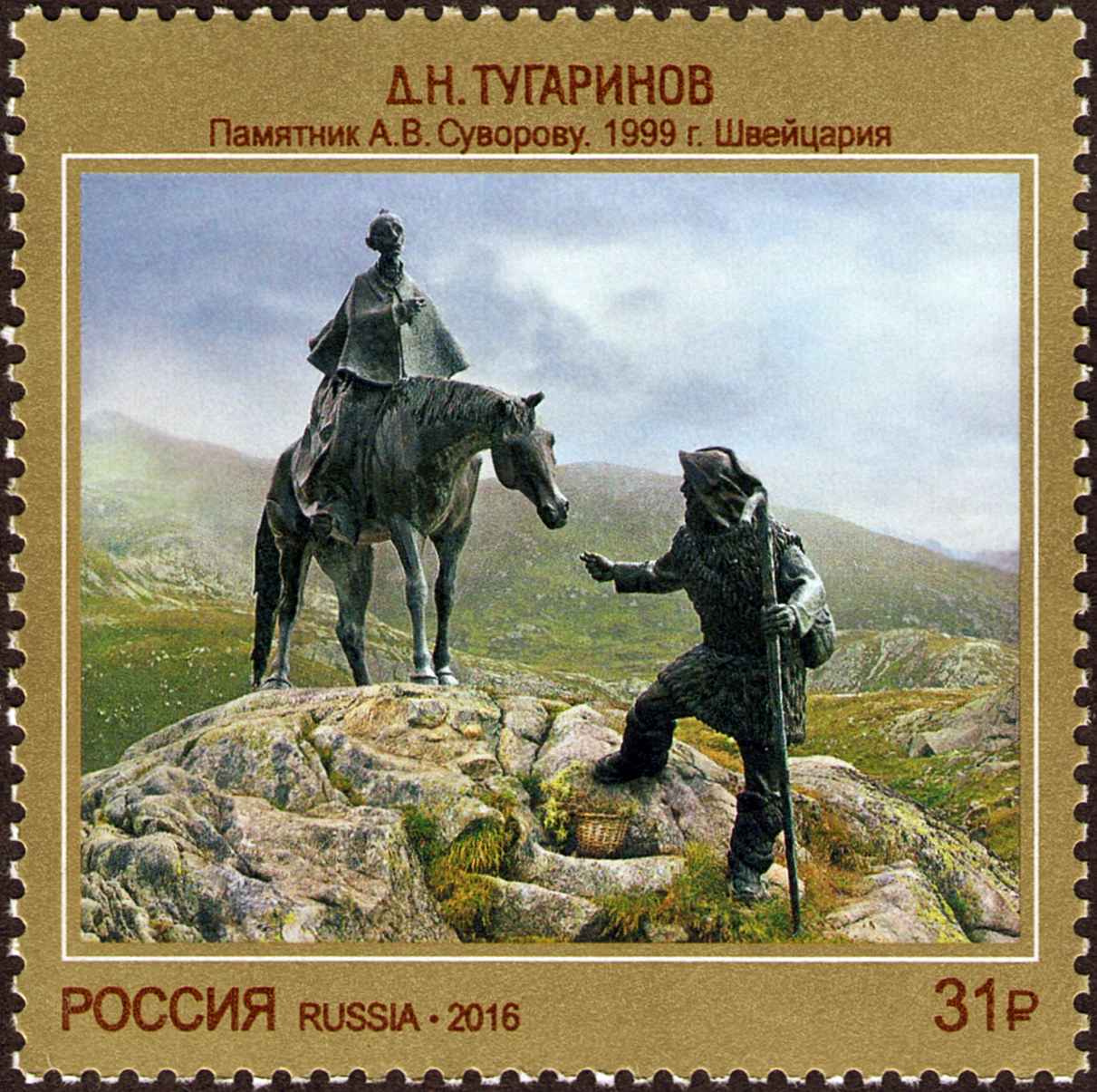
The Monument to Alexander Suvorov and his Swiss assistant Antonio Gamma by Dmitry Nikitovich Tugarinov. Bronze. The Gotthard Pass, Switzerland. 31 rubles.

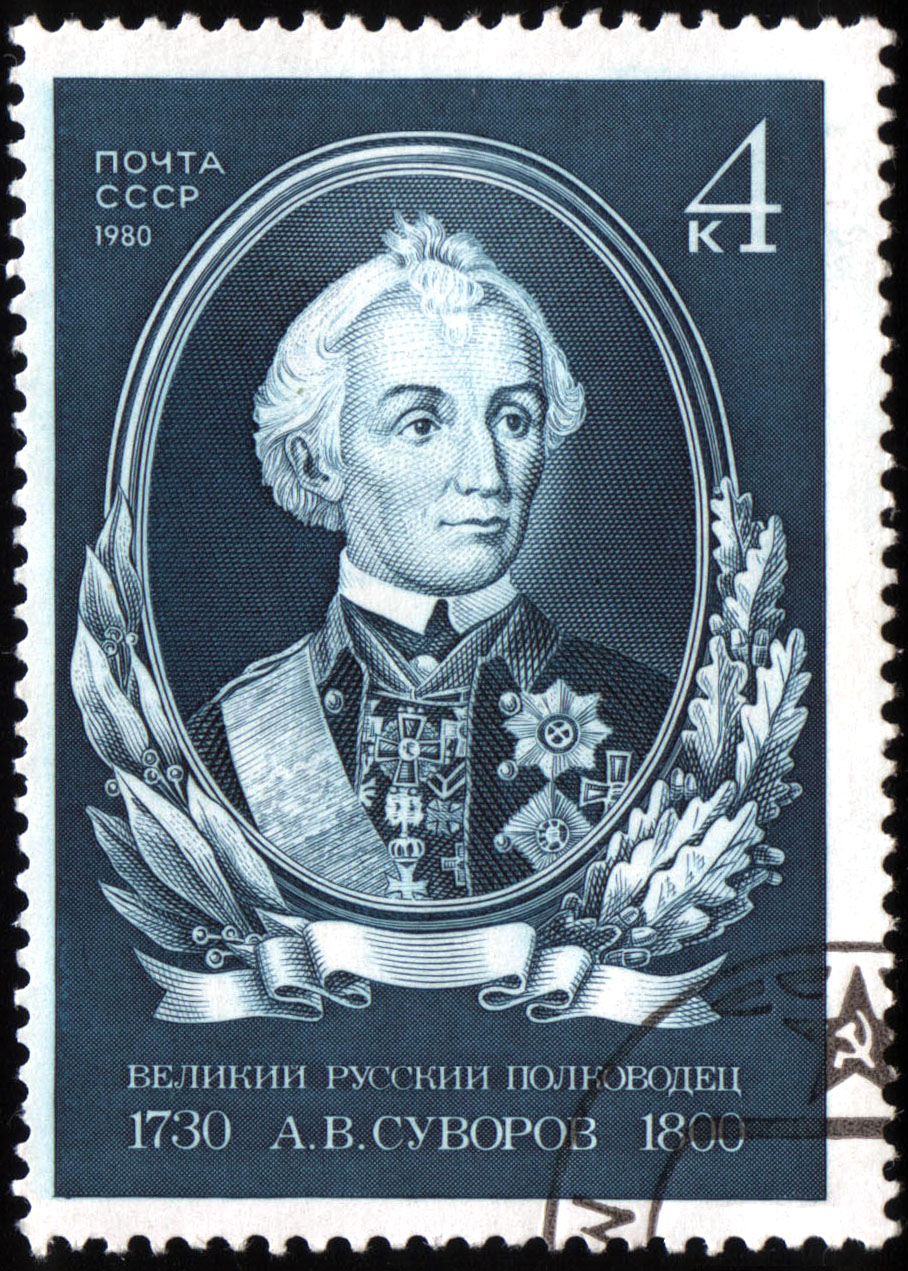
USSR stamp, 1980. 250th anniversary of Suvorov's birth. 4 kopecks.
Additional Swiss memorials

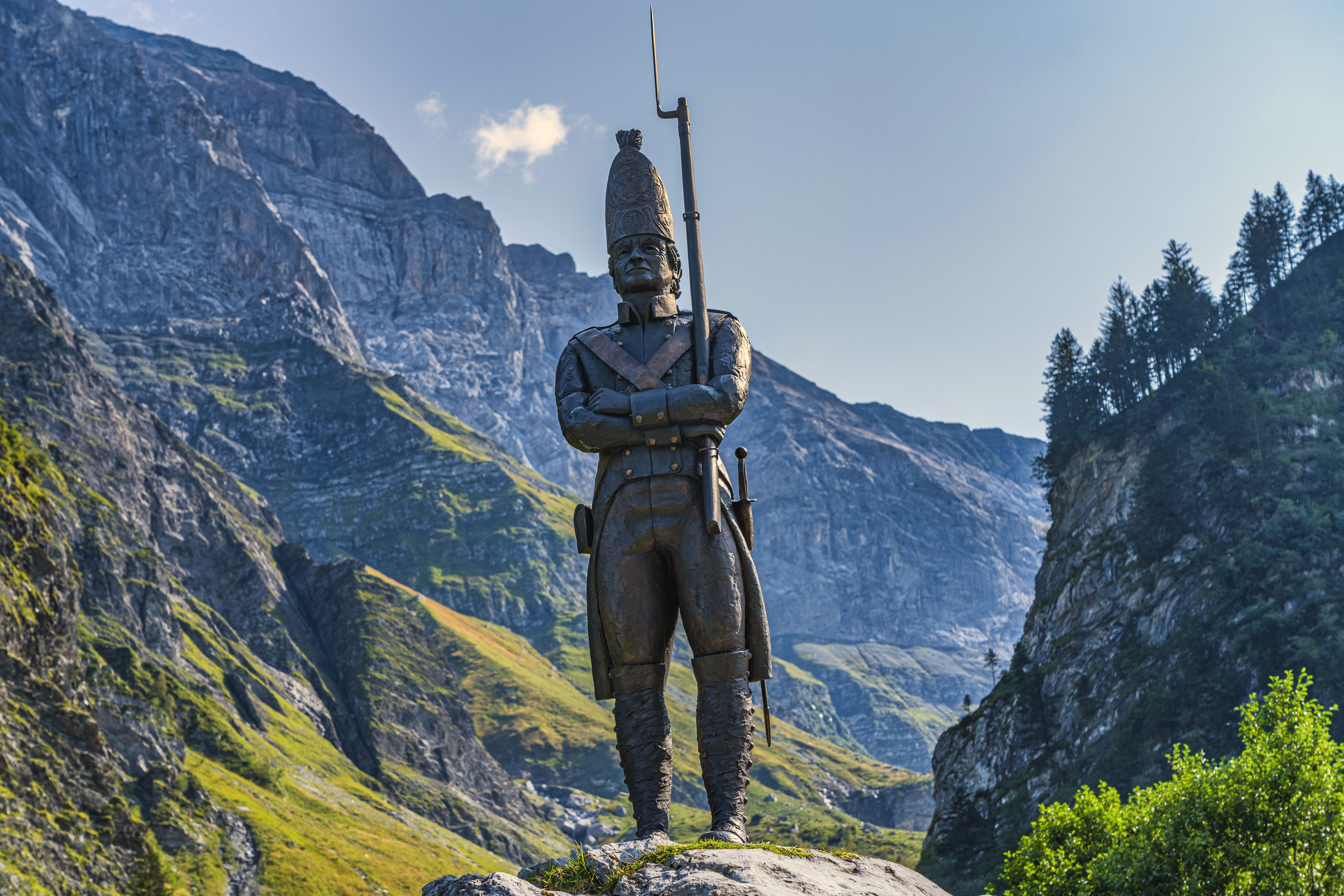
On the Panixer Pass way near Elm GL: a memorial was inaugurated on 6 October 2012 at the Wichlen Shooting Range in Glarus Süd to commemorate the Russian soldiers who marched through here with General Alexander Suvorov during the Second Coalition War. The sculpture of a grenadier was placed on a rock, and a memorial plaque with an inscription is attached to the rock.

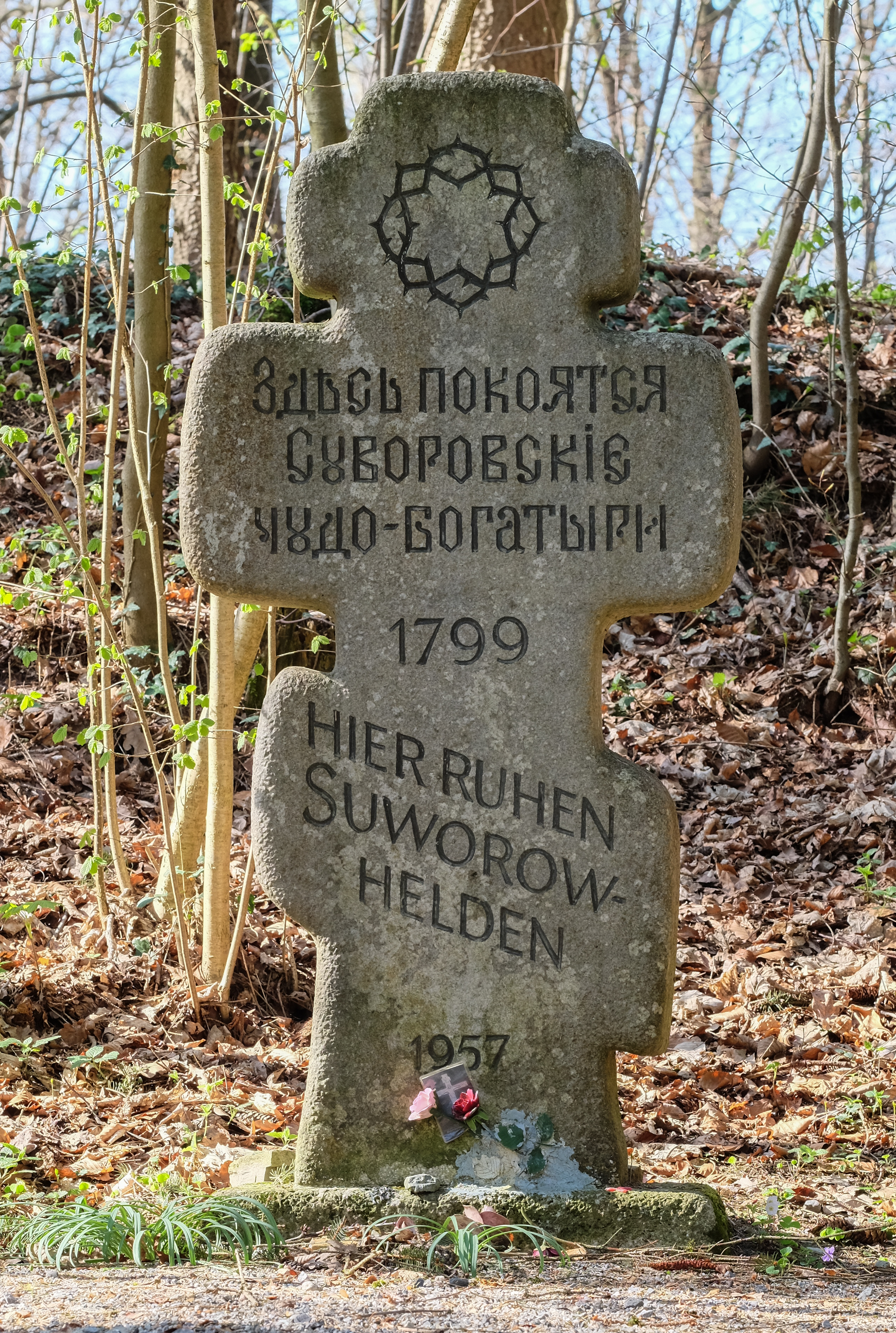
Memorial stone, erected 1957, dedicated to the Russian soldiers of Suvorov's Italian campaign, who died in the hospital of the Weingarten Abbey 1799, and are buried here. Weingarten, Baden-Württemberg, Germany.
Russian: Здесь покоятся суворовские чудо-богатыри, lit. 'This is the resting place of Suvorov's wonder-bogatyrs'
German: Hier Ruhen Suworow-Helden, lit. 'Suvorov's heroes rest here'

=== Ukraine ===
Due to "decommunization policies" the street named after Suvorov in (Ukraine's capital) Kyiv was renamed after Mykhailo Omelianovych-Pavlenko in 2016. Suvorov is not related to communism, but his name was used by the Soviet Union for propaganda purposes.

In September 2022, a street that was named after Suvorov in Dnipro (Ukraine) was renamed to honor Alan Shepard.

In October 2022, during the Russian invasion of Ukraine, Russian troops captured a monument to Suvorov in Kherson and took it with them as they fled the city.

In December 2022, another street in Kyiv that was still named after Suvorov was renamed to Serhiy Kotenko Street.

In January 2023, an image of Suvorov on a monument was removed in Odesa.

In Kherson the Suvorivskyi Raion (urban district), named after General Suvorov, was renamed to Tsentralnyi (Central) Raion in October 2023.

== Literary references ==
Poet Alexander Shishkov devoted an epitaph to Suvorov, while Gavrila Derzhavin mentioned him in Snigir (Bullfinch) and other poems, calling Suvorov "an Alexander by military prowess, a stoic by valor". Suvorov was mentioned by Alexander Pushkin and Mikhail Lermontov and in the numerous works of other Russian poets of the 18th and 19th centuries, such as Ivan Dmitriev, Apollon Maykov, Dmitry Khvostov, Yermil Kostrov, Kondraty Ryleyev, Vasili Popugaev. Kostrov, the first translator of Homer into Russian, wrote an ode in honor of Suvorov and an epistolary on the capture of Izmail. In 1795 poet and soldier Irinarkh Zavalishin, who had fought under the command of Alexander Suvorov, wrote a heroic poem titled "Suvoriada", celebrating Suvorov's victories. Suvorov is one of the characters in the drama "Antonio Gamba, Companion of Suvorov in the Alpine Mountains" by Sergey Glinka which commemorates the Swiss expedition of 1799. In British literature, Byron caricatured Suvorov in the seventh canto of Don Juan. In Leo Tolstoy's War and Peace, old Prince Nicholas Bolkonski says: "Suvorov couldn't manage them so what chance has Michael Kutuzov?". Tolstoy also refers to Suvorov later on in the book. Suvorov is also mentioned by Capt. Ryków in Adam Mickiewicz's poem Pan Tadeusz.

== See also ==
- Suvorov Military School
- Suvorov military canals
- Suwarrow
- Suvorov Museum, Saint Petersburg
- Suvorov Museum, Timanivka
- Order of Suvorov
- Medal of Suvorov
- Suvorov (film)
- Russian battleship Knyaz Suvorov
- Soviet cruiser Aleksandr Suvorov
- River cruise ship Aleksandr Suvorov
- Russian submarine Generalissimus Suvorov
- Suvorov's Swiss campaign

== Attribution ==
In English:

- This article incorporates text from a publication now in the public domain: Chisholm, Hugh, ed. (1911). "Suvárov, Alexander Vasilievich". Encyclopædia Britannica. Vol. 26 (11th ed.). Cambridge University Press. pp. 172–173.
- Goodwin, J. (1998). Lords of the Horizons. New York: Henry Holt and Company. p. 244. ISBN 978-0-8050-6342-4.
- Longworth, Philip (1965). The Art of Victory: The Life and Achievements of Generalissimo Suvorov, 1729–1800. Constable. ISBN 978-0-09-451170-5.
  - Longworth, Philip (1966). The Art of Victory: The Life and Achievements of Field-Marshal Suvorov, 1729-1800. Holt, Rinehart and Winston.
- Ledonne, John P. (2003). The Grand Strategy of the Russian Empire, 1650–1831 (Uitgawe and Revised ed.). New York: Oxford University Press US. ISBN 978-0-19-516100-7.
- Alexander, John T. (1989). Catherine the Great: Life and Legend. New York: Oxford University Press US. ISBN 978-0-19-506162-8.
- Duffy, Christopher (1999). Eagles Over the Alps: Suvorov in Italy and Switzerland, 1799. Chicago, Illinois: The Emperor's Press. ISBN 978-1883476182.
- Pares, Bernard (1926). A History Of Russia. London: Jonathan Cape.
- Anthing, Johann Friedrich (1813). History of the Campaigns of Count Alexander Suworow-Rymnikski. London: W. Green and T. Chaplin.
- Osipov, K. (1939). Alexander Suvorov. Translated by Bone, Edith. London, New York, and Melbourne: Hutchinson & Co. (Publishers) Ltd..
- Peter Paret, Gordon A. Craig, Felix Gilbert. "Russian Military Thought: The Western Model and the Shadow of Suvorov" in the Makers of Modern Strategy from Machiavelli to the Nuclear Age. Princeton University Press, 1986, p. 354.
- Fuller, William C. Jr. "Suvorov, Alexander" in The Reader's Companion to Military History. Ed. by Robert Cowley & Geoffrey Parker. Houghton Mifflin Harcourt. 1996. p. 457.
- Clodfelter, M. (2017). Warfare and Armed Conflicts: A Statistical Encyclopedia of Casualty and Other Figures, 1492–2015 (4th ed.). Jefferson, North Carolina: McFarland. ISBN 978-0-7864-7470-7.
- Giangrande, Cathy; Norwich, John Julius (2003). Saint Petersburg: Museums, Palaces, and Historic Collections. Bunker Hill Publishing, Inc. p. 71. ISBN 1593730004.
- Lieut.-Colonel Spalding, Suvorof (London, 1890).
- "Alexander Vasilyevitch Suvorov, a great Russian commander, was born". Presidential Library.
- Isinger, Russell (October 1996). "Aleksandr Suvorov: Count of Rymniksky and Prince of Italy". Military History.

In Russian:

- Polevoy, Nikolai (1897). История князя Италийского, графа Суворова-Рымникского, генералиссимуса российских войск [History of the Prince Italiysky, Count Suvorov-Rymniksky, Generalissimo of the Russian Forces]. Moscow: Типография Вильде.
- Petrov, Andrey (1874). Война России с Турцией и Польскими конфедератами. С 1769—1774 год [Russia's war with Turkey and the Polish confederates]. Vol. III. St. Petersburg: Типография К. В. Трубникова. Литейная, дом №42.
- Novikov, Nikolay Vasilyevich (1948). Боевая летопись русского флота [Battle chronicle of the Russian navy]. Moscow: Военное издательство министерства вооруженных сил союза ССР.
- Petrushevsky, Alexander F. (1900). Генералиссимус князь Суворов [Generalissimo Prince Suvorov]. Saint Petersburg: Типография М. М. Стасюлевича.
- Bogolyubov, Aleksandr Nikolayevich (1939). Полководческое искусство А.В. Суворова [A.V. Suvorov's art of leadership]. Moscow: Voenizdat. ISBN 978-5-4484-0277-7.
- Rostunov, Ivan I. (1989). Генералиссимус Александр Васильевич Суворов: Жизнь и полководческая деятельность [Generalissimo Alexander Suvorov: Life and military activity]. Moscow: Voenizdat. ISBN 5-203-00046-8.
- Velichko, Konstantin; Novitsky, Vasily; Schwartz, Alexey von; Apushkin, Vladimir; Schoultz, Gustav von (1912). Военная энциклопедия Сытина [Sytin Military Encyclopedia]. Vol. VIII: Гимры – Двигатели судовые. Moscow: Типография Т-ва И. Д. Сытина.
  - Velichko, Konstantin; Novitsky, Vasily; Schwartz, Alexey von; Apushkin, Vladimir; Schoultz, Gustav von (1915). Sytin Military Encyclopedia. Vol. XIV: Круковский – Линта. Moscow: Тип. Т-ва И. Д. Сытина.
    - Velichko, Konstantin; Novitsky, Vasily; Schwartz, Alexey von; Apushkin, Vladimir; Schoultz, Gustav von (1914). Sytin Military Encyclopedia. Vol. XVII: Нитроглицерин – Патруль. Moscow: Тип. Т-ва И. Д. Сытина.
- Orlov, Nikolay Aleksandrovich (1892). Разбор военных действий Суворова в Италии в 1799 году [Analysis of Suvorov's military actions in Italy in 1799]. St. Petersburg: Тип. Тренке и Фюсно. ISBN 9785998994289.
- Milyutin, Dmitry (1852). История войны России с Францией в царствование Императора Павла I в 1799 году [The history of Russia's war with France during the reign of Emperor Paul I in 1799]. Vol. II. St. Petersburg: Типография штаба военно-учебных заведений.
- Polovtsov, Alexander (1912). Russian Biographical Dictionary. Vol. 20: Суворова—Ткачев. St. Petersburg: Типография Товарищества "Общественная Польза".
- Mikhaylov, Oleg Nikolaevich (1973). Суворов [Suvorov]. Moscow: Young Guard.
- Kipnis, Boris Grigoryevich (2021). Непобедимый. Жизнь и сражения Александра Суворова [Invincible. Life and battles of Aleksandr Suvorov]. St. Petersburg: Издательский дом "Питер". ISBN 9785446112845.
- Bantysh-Kamensky, Dmitri (1840). Биографии российских генералиссимусов и генерал-фельдмаршалов. с 48 портретами. – Часть вторая [Biographies of Russian generalissimos and general-fieldmarshals. With 48 portraits – Part two]. St. Petersburg: Тип. Третьего Департамента Министерства Государственных Имуществ.
- Zolotaryov, V. A. (2023). "СУВОРОВ АЛЕКСАНДР ВАСИЛЬЕВИЧ". Great Russian Encyclopedia. Electronic version.
- Gutakov, Vladimir (2007). "Русский путь к югу. Часть вторая" [Russian way to the south. Part 2]. Вестник Европы. No. 21.
- Alexeyev, Alexander (2010). "Непобедимый полководец" [Invincible military commander]. Science and Life. No. 3. Moscow.

In German:

- Bodart, Gaston (1908). Militär-historisches Kriegs-Lexikon (1618–1905). Vienna and Leipzig: C. W. Stern.
