= Imperial Russian Army =

Army of the Russian Empire (1721–1917)

- Русская императорская армия
- Badge of the Imperial Russian Army
- Motto: За Веру, Царя и Отечество "For Faith, Tsar, and Fatherland"
- Founded: 2 November 1721; 304 years ago (Note: Proclamation of the Russian Empire.)
- Disbanded: 14 September 1917; 109 years ago (Note: Declaration of the Russian Republic. On 22 November 1917 the Bolsheviks took control of the army command after the October Revolution, all officers lost their ranks, orders, and medals by decree, and in December 1917 all officers were ordered to resign.)
- Service branches: Regular troops; Cossack troops; Muslim troops; State militia
- Headquarters: Imperial Main Headquarters

Leadership
- Commander-in-chief: Emperor of Russia
- Governing body: General Staff: Stavka of the Supreme Commander (1914–17)
- Supreme Commander (1914—17): Grand Duke Nicholas (first); Nikolai Dukhonin (last)
- Chief of the General Staff: Pyotr Volkonsky (first); Vladimir Marushevsky (last)

Personnel
- Military age: 21–43
- Conscription: 2–6 years; compulsory service
- Active personnel: 1,000,000–1,300,000 (1913); 15,000,000+ (total served; 1914–17)

Expenditure
- Budget: 325.6 million rubles (1902)

Related articles
- History: Military history of the Russian Empire
- Ranks: Ranks of the Imperial Russian military

Military summary
Wars (Note: Notable engagements in which the Imperial Russian Army participated.)	Notable commanders (Note: Notable military leaders of the Imperial Russian Army.)
Expand list: Great Northern War; Russo-Turkish Wars; Russo-Swedish Wars; Russo-Persian Wars; Russo-Polish Wars; Seven Years' War; Great French War; Caucasian War; Crimean War; Wars in Siberia; Wars in Central Asia; Boxer Rebellion; Russo-Japanese War; World War I; Russian Revolution	Expand list: Peter the Great; Alexander I; Boris Sheremetev; Alexander Menshikov; Mikhail Golitsyn; Peter Lacy; Khristofor von Münnich; Pyotr Saltykov; Pyotr Rumyantsev; Alexander Suvorov; Grigory Potemkin; Ivan Gudovich; Weismann von Weißenstein; Andrei Rosenberg; Mikhail Kutuzov (Golenishchev-Kutuzov); Mikhail Barclay de Tolly; Pyotr Bagration; Peter Wittgenstein; Mikhail Vorontsov; Pyotr Kotlyarevsky; Nikolay Kamensky; Leonty Bennigsen; Mikhail Miloradovich; Ivan Paskevich; Aleksey Yermolov; Ivan Diebitsch; Nikolay Muravyov; Mikhail Gorchakov; Konstantin von Kaufmann; Dmitry Milyutin; Mikhail Dragomirov; Mikhail Skobelev; Aleksei Brusilov; Nikolai Ivanov; Alexey Kaledin; Nikolai Yudenich; Anton Denikin; Pyotr Wrangel

The Imperial Russian Army (Russian: Русская императорская армия, romanized: Russkaya imperatorskaya armiya) was the army of the Russian Empire, active from 1721 until the Russian Revolution of 1917. It was organized into a standing army and a state militia. The standing army consisted of regular troops and two forces that served on separate regulations: the Cossack troops and the Muslim troops.

A regular Russian army existed before the end of the Great Northern War in 1721. During his reign, Peter the Great accelerated the modernization of Russia's armed forces, including with a decree in 1699 that created the basis for recruiting soldiers, military regulations for the organization of the army in 1716, and creating the College of War in 1718 for the army administration. Starting in 1700 Peter began replacing the older Streltsy forces with new Western-style regiments organized on the basis of his already existing Guards regiments.

After the Napoleonic Wars the active Russian Army was maintained at just over 1 million men, which was increased to 1.7 million during the Crimean War. It remained at around this level until the outbreak of World War I, at which point Russia had the largest peacetime standing army in Europe, about 1.3 million. The wartime mobilization increased this to a strength of 4.5 million, and in total 15 million men served from 1914 to 1917.

In March 1917 the Imperial Army swore loyalty to the Russian Provisional Government after the abdication of Emperor Nicholas II, though the official status of the monarchy was not resolved until September 1917, when the Russian Republic was declared. Even after the February Revolution, despite its ineffectiveness on the offensive, the majority of the army remained intact and the troops were still at the front lines. The "old army" did not begin disintegrating until early 1918.

== History ==
=== Precursors: Regiments of the New Order ===
Russian tsars before Peter the Great maintained professional hereditary musketeer corps known as streltsy. These were originally raised by Ivan the Terrible; originally an effective force, they had become highly unreliable and undisciplined. In times of war, the armed forces were augmented by peasants.

The regiments of the new order, or regiments of the foreign order (Полки нового строя or Полки иноземного строя, Polki novovo (inozemnovo) stroya), was the Russian term that was used to describe military units that were formed in the Tsardom of Russia in the 17th century according to the Western European military standards.

There were different kinds of regiments, such as the regulars (infantry), dragoons, and reiters. In 1631, the Russians created two regular regiments in Moscow. During the Smolensk War of 1632–1634, six more regular regiments, one reiter regiment, and a dragoon regiment were formed. Initially, they recruited children of the landless boyars and streltsy, volunteers, Cossacks and others. Commanding officers comprised mostly foreigners. After the war with Poland, all of the regiments were disbanded. During another Russo-Polish War, they were created again and became a principal force of the Russian Army. Often, regular and dragoon regiments were manned with datochniye lyudi for lifelong military service. Reiters were manned with small or landless gentry and boyars' children and were paid with money (or lands) for their service. More than a half of the commanding officers were representatives from the gentry. In times of peace, some of the regiments were usually disbanded.

In 1681, there were 33 regular regiments (61,000 men) and 25 dragoon and reiter regiments (29,000 men). In the late 17th century, regiments of the new type represented more than a half of the Russian Army and at the beginning of the 18th century were used for creating a regular army.

=== Introduction of conscription ===
Conscription in Russia was introduced by Peter the Great in December 1699, though reports say Peter's father also used it. The conscripts were called "recruits". They were not volunteers.

Peter formed a modern regular army built on the German model, but with a new aspect: officers not necessarily from nobility, as talented commoners were given promotions that eventually included a noble title at the attainment of an officer's rank (such promotions were later abolished during the reign of Catherine the Great). Conscription of peasants and townspeople was based on quota system, per settlement. Initially, it was based on the number of households, later it was based on the population numbers.

The term of service in the 18th century was for life. In 1793, it was reduced to 25 years. In 1834, it was reduced to 20 years plus five years in the reserve, and in 1855 to 12 years plus three years in the reserve.

=== 1730s–1740s ===
In 1731, Field Marshal Christofor Münnich was appointed chairman of a commission aimed at reorganizing the army and finding ways to maintain it without placing an undue burden on the people. He drafted a new structure for the Guard, field, and garrison regiments; formed two new guards regiments—the Izmailovsky and the Horse Guards; introduced cuirassiers; separated the engineering branch from the artillery; and established the First Cadet Corps. He also took measures to standardise military uniforms and equipment and organised twenty regiments of the Ukrainian militia, drawn from the odnodvortsy (single-homesteaders) of the Belgorod and Sevsk districts.

Münnich's successes on the battlefield include Danzig, Stavuchany and other victories over the Ottoman Turks. Field Marshal Peter Lacy achieved such successes as Azov, the Crimean campaign and Villmanstrand.

=== 1750s–1790s ===
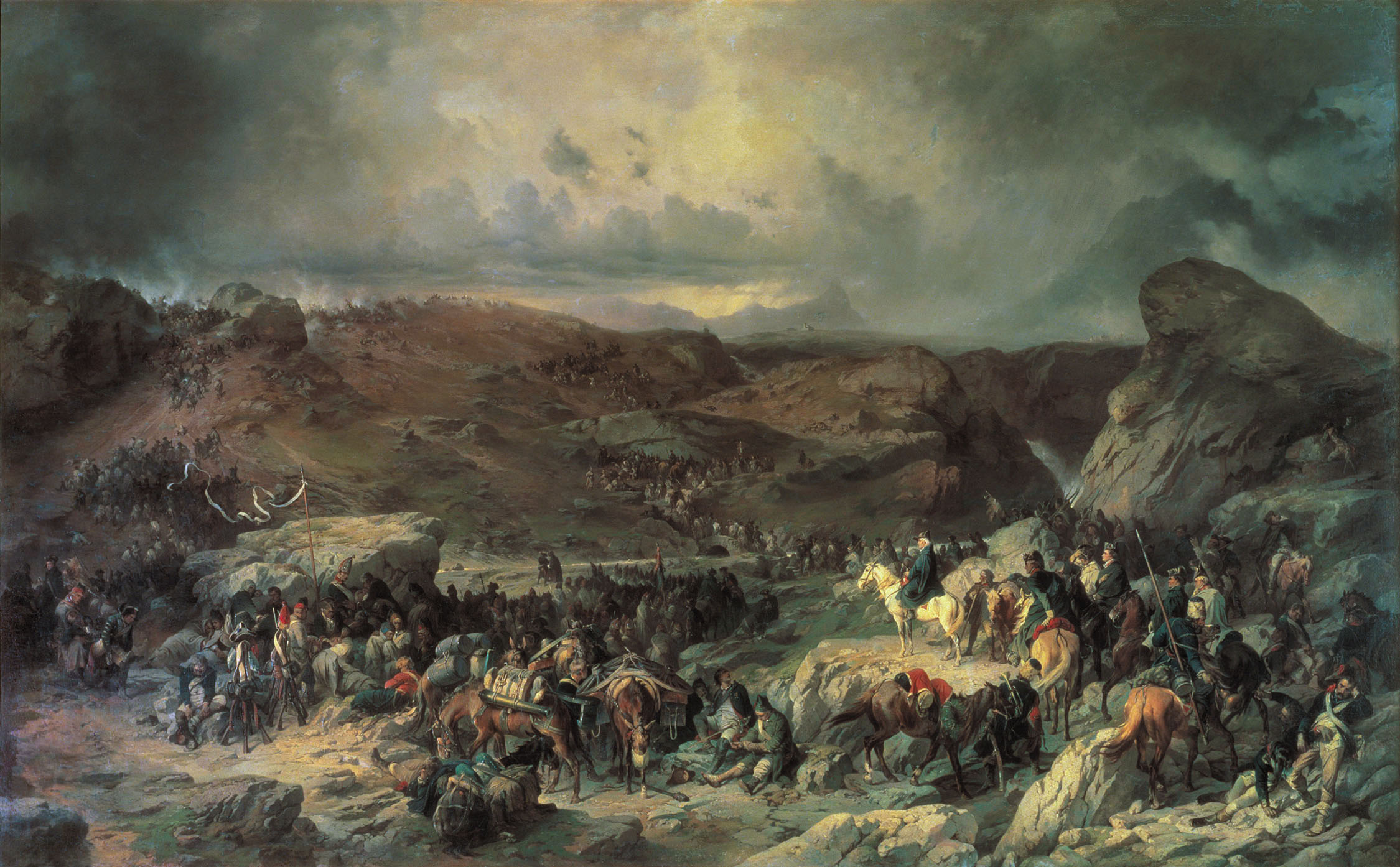
General Suvorov crossing the St. Gotthard Pass during the Italian and Swiss expedition in 1799.

The history of the Russian Army in this era was principally linked to the name of the Russian general and military theorist Alexander Suvorov, considered to be one of the few great military commanders in history who never lost a battle. He left behind a legacy of warfare for future generations of Russian military leaders of the empire. His teacher, in turn, was Pyotr Rumyantsev, who carried out army reforms and won such victories as Kolberg, Larga and, most notably, Kagul. Rumyantsev's mentor was Pyotr Saltykov, who defeated his Prussian opponent at Kay and Frederick the Great himself at Kunersdorf. Suvorov also managed to successfully fight the Prussians in small skirmishes.

From 1768 to 1774 Suvorov served in the Russo-Turkish War (1768–1774), against the Bar Confederation, and fought victorious battles. From 1777 to 1783 he served in the Crimea and in the Caucasus, becoming a lieutenant-general in 1780, and general of infantry in 1783, on the conclusion of his work there. From 1787 to 1791, he again fought the Turks during another Russo-Turkish War and won many victories. Suvorov's leadership also played a key role in a Russian victory over the Poles during the Kościuszko Uprising. His victories over Ottoman Turkey and the Polish-Lithuanian Commonwealth ensured Russia's further expansion to the south and west. Suvorov's Italian campaign reversed Napoleon's gains of 1796 and 1797 while Napoleon himself was campaigning in Egypt and Syria. During it, he outmaneuvered and defeated in several battles the French Army of Italy (including its offshoot, the Army of Naples). However, the Austrians were unable to hold Italy back from Napoleon's renewed onslaught. The Swiss campaign, launched at the direction and initiative of Austria (the Habsburg monarchy), failed due to a lack of human and material resources and also largely due to the inept actions of Suvorov's colleague, Alexander Rimsky-Korsakov.

Suvorov's successes on a battlefield include such impressive military encounters as Orzechowo, Lanckorona, Stołowicze, Turtucaia, Kozludzha, Kinburn, Focsani, Rymnik, Izmail, Krupczyce, Brest, Praga, Adda, Trebbia, Novi and Muttental (the last victory is also in many ways the achievement of General of Infantry Andrei Rosenberg).

=== Napoleonic Wars ===
==== Imperial Russian Army in 1805 ====
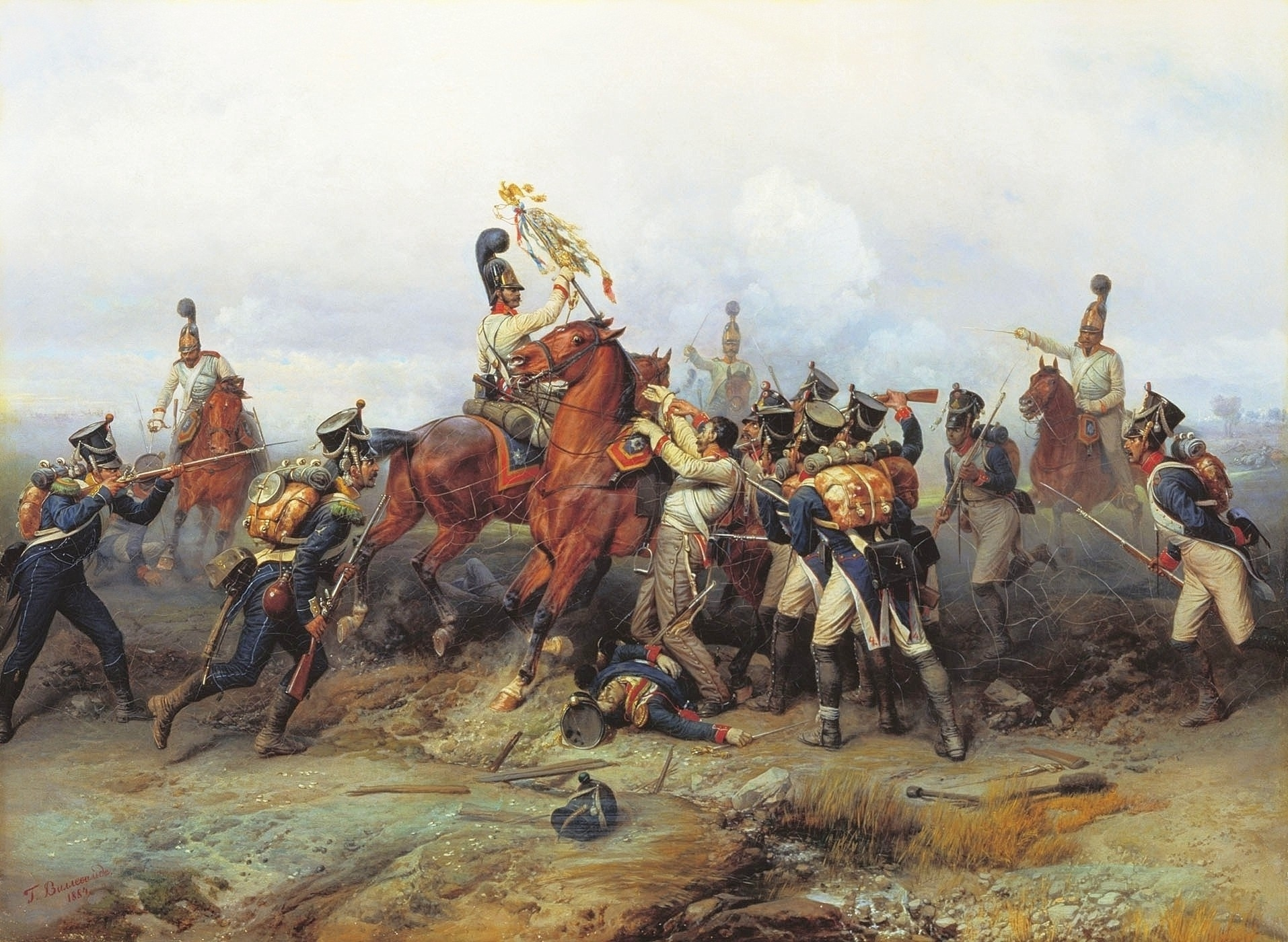
Capture of a French Imperial Eagle by the Russian Imperial Guard at the Battle of Austerlitz

As a major European power, Russia could not escape the wars involving Revolutionary France and the First French Empire, but as an adversary to Napoleon, the leadership of the new emperor, Alexander I of Russia (r. 1801–1825), who came to the throne as the result of his father's assassination (in which he was rumoured to be implicated) became crucial.

The Russian Army in 1805 had many characteristics of Ancien Régime organization: there was no permanent formation above the regimental level, senior officers were largely recruited from aristocratic circles, and the Russian soldier, in line with 18th-century practice, was regularly beaten and punished to instill discipline. Furthermore, many lower-level officers were poorly trained and had difficulty getting their men to perform the sometimes complex manoeuvres required in a battle. Nevertheless, the Russians did have a fine artillery arm manned by soldiers trained in academies and who would regularly fight hard to prevent their pieces from falling into enemy hands.

Both the Russians and Austrians met a decisive military defeat at the hands of Napoleon during the Battle of Austerlitz in 1805.

==== War of 1806–1807 ====
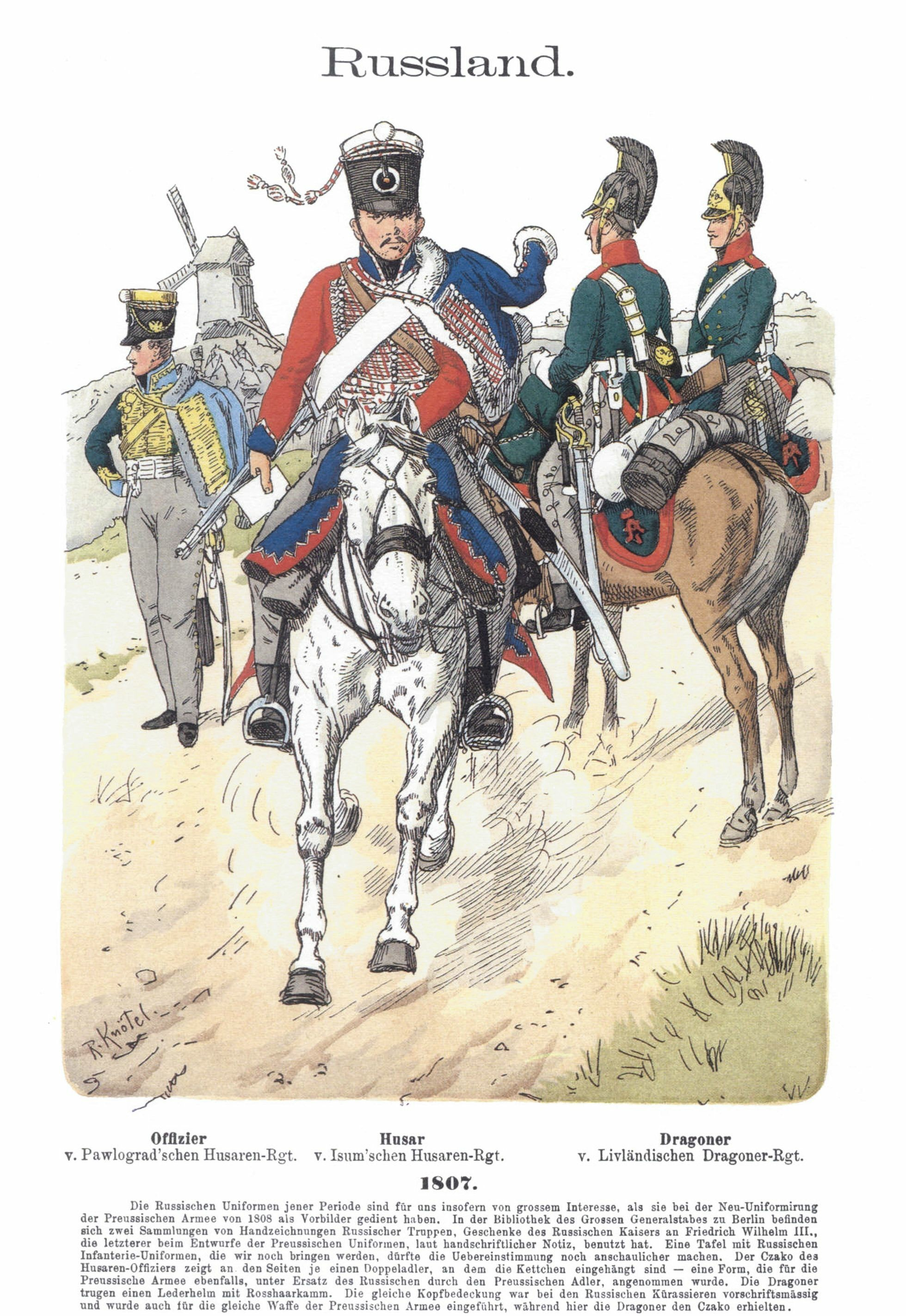
Russian dragoons and hussars in 1807

The War of the Fourth Coalition (1806–1807) involving Prussia, Russia, Saxony, Sweden and the United Kingdom against France formed within months of the collapse of the previous coalition. In August 1806, King Frederick William III of Prussia made the decision to go to war independently of any other great power except neighbouring Russia. Another course of action might have involved declaring war the previous year and joining Austria and Russia. This might have contained Napoleon and prevented the Allied disaster in the Battle of Austerlitz. In any event, the Russian Army, an ally of Prussia, still remained far away when Prussia declared war.

Napoleon smashed the main Prussian armies at the Battle of Jena–Auerstedt on 14 October 1806 and hunted down the survivors during the remainder of October and November. Having destroyed all Prussian forces west of the Oder, Napoleon pushed east to seize Warsaw. In late December, the initial clashes between the French and Russians at Czarnowo, Golymin, and Pułtusk were without result. The French emperor put his troops into winter quarters east of the Vistula River, but the new Russian commander Levin August von Bennigsen refused to remain passive.

Bennigsen shifted his army north into East Prussia and launched a stroke at the French strategic left wing. The main force of the blow was evaded by the French at the Battle of Mohrungen in late January 1807. In response, Napoleon mounted a counterattack designed to cut off the Russians. Bennigsen managed to avoid entrapment and the two sides fought the Battle of Eylau on 7 and 8 February 1807. After this indecisive bloodbath both sides belatedly went into winter quarters. In early June, Bennigsen mounted an offensive that was quickly parried by the French. Napoleon launched a pursuit toward Königsberg but the Russians successfully fended it off at the Battle of Heilsberg. On 14 June, Bennigsen unwisely fought the Battle of Friedland with a river at his back and saw his army mauled with heavy losses. Following this defeat, Alexander was forced to sue for peace with Napoleon at Tilsit on 7 July 1807, with Russia becoming Napoleon's ally. Russia lost little territory under the treaty, and Alexander made use of his alliance with Napoleon for further expansion. Napoleon created the Duchy of Warsaw out of former Prussian territory.

==== Swedish and Turkish wars ====
At the Congress of Erfurt (September–October 1808) Napoleon and Alexander agreed that Russia should force Sweden to join the Continental System, which led to the Finnish War of 1808–1809 and to the division of Sweden into two parts separated by the Gulf of Bothnia. The eastern part became the Russian Grand Duchy of Finland. During this war, General Nikolay Kamensky distinguished himself by defeating his opponents at Oravais and other battles.

The Russo-Turkish War broke out in 1805–06 against the background of the Napoleonic Wars. The Ottoman Empire, encouraged by the Russian defeat in the Battle of Austerlitz, deposed the Russophile hospodars of its vassal states Moldavia (Alexander Mourouzis) and Wallachia (Constantine Ypsilantis). Simultaneously, their French allies occupied Dalmatia and threatened to penetrate the Danubian principalities at any time. In order to safeguard the Russian border against a possible French attack and support the First Serbian uprising, a 40,000-strong Russian contingent advanced into Moldavia and Wallachia. The Sultan reacted by blocking the Dardanelles to Russian ships in 1807 and declared war on Russia. The war lasted until 1812. Generals Kamensky and Kutuzov crush the Turks at Batin (1810) and Slobozia respectively (1811).

In the Finnish War Alexander wrested the Grand Duchy of Finland from Sweden in 1809, and acquired Bessarabia from Turkey in 1812.

==== Anglo-Russian War (1807–1812) ====
The requirement of joining France's Continental Blockade against Britain was a serious disruption of Russian commerce, and in 1810 Alexander repudiated the obligation. This strategic change was followed by a substantial reform in the army undertaken by Michael Andreas Barclay de Tolly as the Minister of War (see French invasion of Russia § Russian military reforms).

At the same time, Russia continued its expansion. The Congress of Vienna created the Kingdom of Poland (Russian Poland), to which Alexander granted a constitution. Thus, Alexander I became the constitutional monarch of Poland while remaining the autocratic Emperor of Russia. He was also the Grand Duke of Finland, which had been annexed from Sweden in 1809 and awarded autonomous status.

The Russo-French alliance gradually became strained. Napoleon was concerned about Russia's intentions in the strategically vital Bosphorus and Dardanelles straits. At the same time, Alexander viewed the Duchy of Warsaw, the French-controlled reconstituted Polish state, with suspicion. The result was the War of the Sixth Coalition from 1812 to 1814.

==== French invasion of Russia ====
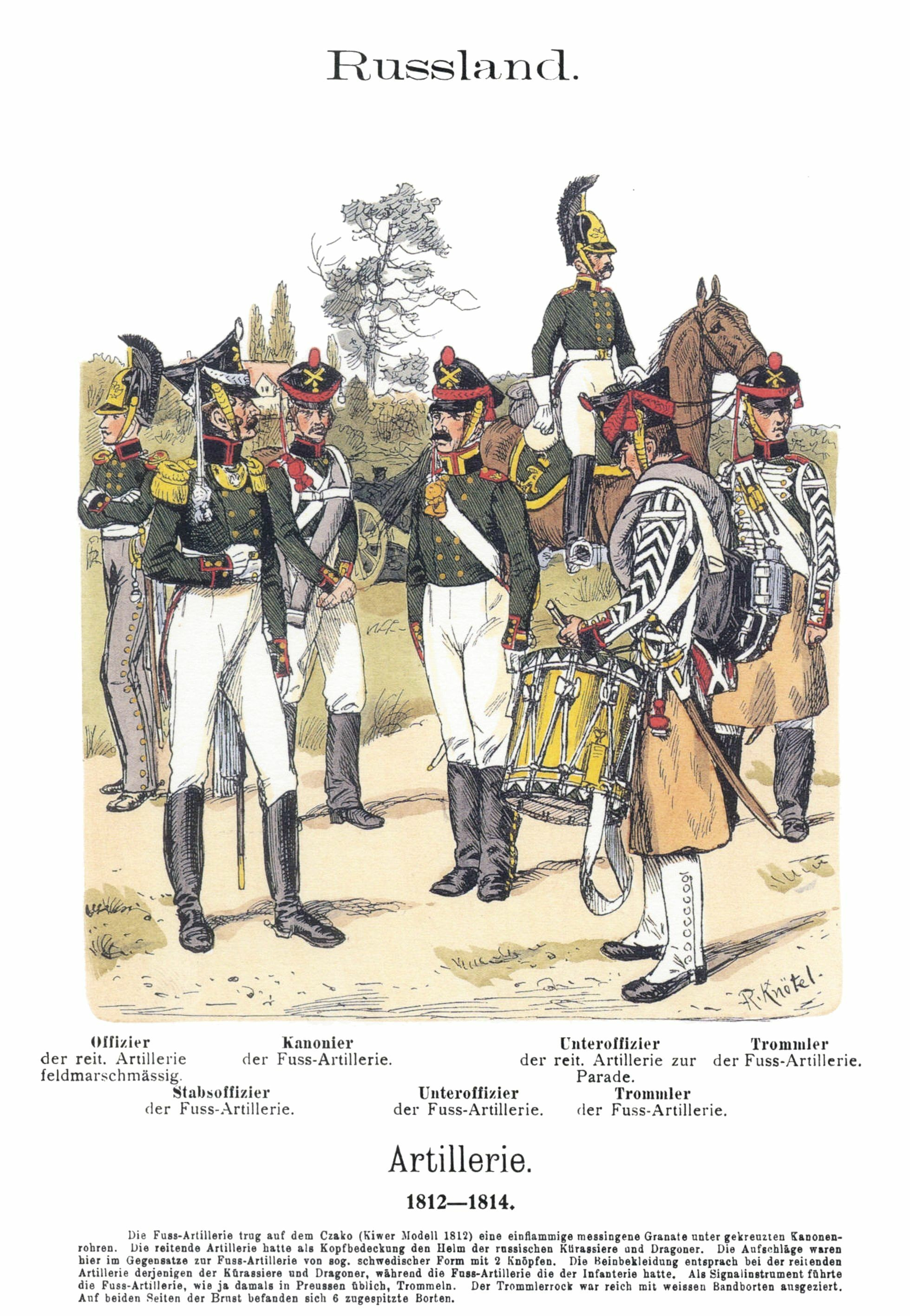
Russian artillerymen in 1812–1814

In 1812, Napoleon invaded Russia to compel Alexander I to remain in the Continental System and to remove the imminent threat of Russian invasion of Poland. The Grande Armée, 650,000 men (270,000 Frenchmen and many soldiers of allies or subject powers), crossed the Neman on 23 June 1812. Russia proclaimed a Patriotic War, while Napoleon proclaimed a Second Polish war, but against the expectations of the Poles who supplied almost 100,000 troops for the invasion force he avoided any concessions toward Poland, having in mind further negotiations with Russia. Russia maintained a scorched earth policy of retreat, broken only by the Battle of Borodino on 7 September, when the Russians stood and fought. This was bloody and the Russians eventually retreated, opening the road to Moscow. Field Marshal Mikhail Kutuzov made the decision in order to preserve the army. By 14 September, the French captured Moscow. The Russian governor Prince Rastopchin ordered the city burnt to the ground and large parts of it were destroyed. Alexander I refused to capitulate, and with no sign of clear victory in sight, Napoleon was forced to withdraw from Moscow's ruins. So the disastrous Great Retreat began, with 370,000 casualties largely as a result of starvation and the freezing weather conditions, and 200,000 captured. Napoleon narrowly escaped total annihilation at the Battle of Berezina, but his army was wrecked nevertheless. By December only 20,000 fit soldiers from the main army were among those who recrossed the Neman at Kaunas. By this time Napoleon had abandoned his army to return to Paris and prepare a defence against the advancing Russians.

==== 1813 campaign in Germany ====
As the French retreated, the Russians pursued them into Poland and Prussia, causing the Prussian Corps under Ludwig Yorck von Wartenburg that had been formerly a part of the Grande Armée to ultimately change sides in the Convention of Tauroggen. This soon forced Prussia to declare war on France, and with its mobilisation, for many Prussian officers serving in the Russian Army to leave, creating a serious shortage of experienced officers in the Russian Army. After the death of Kutuzov in early 1813, command of the Russian Army passed to Peter Wittgenstein. The campaign was noted for the number of sieges the Russian Army conducted and a large number of Narodnoe Opolcheniye (irregular troops) that continued to serve in its ranks until newly trained recruits could reach the area of combat operations. Aleksey Yermolov emerged as one of the leading and talented senior commanders of the army, participating in many important battles, including Kulm and Leipzig.

In 1813 Russia gained territory in the Baku area of the Caucasus from Qajar Iran as much due to the news of Napoleon's defeat in 1812 as the fear by the Shah of a new campaign against him by the resurgent Russian Army where the 1810 campaign led by Matvei Platov failed. This was immediately used to raise new regiments, and to begin creating a greater foothold in the Caucasus. General Pyotr Kotlyarevsky distinguished himself in the Iranian war, defeating the Iranians at Lankaran and other places. By the early 19th century, the empire also was firmly ensconced in Alaska reached via Cossack expeditions to Siberia, although only a rudimentary military presence was possible due to the distance from Europe.

==== 1814 campaign in France ====
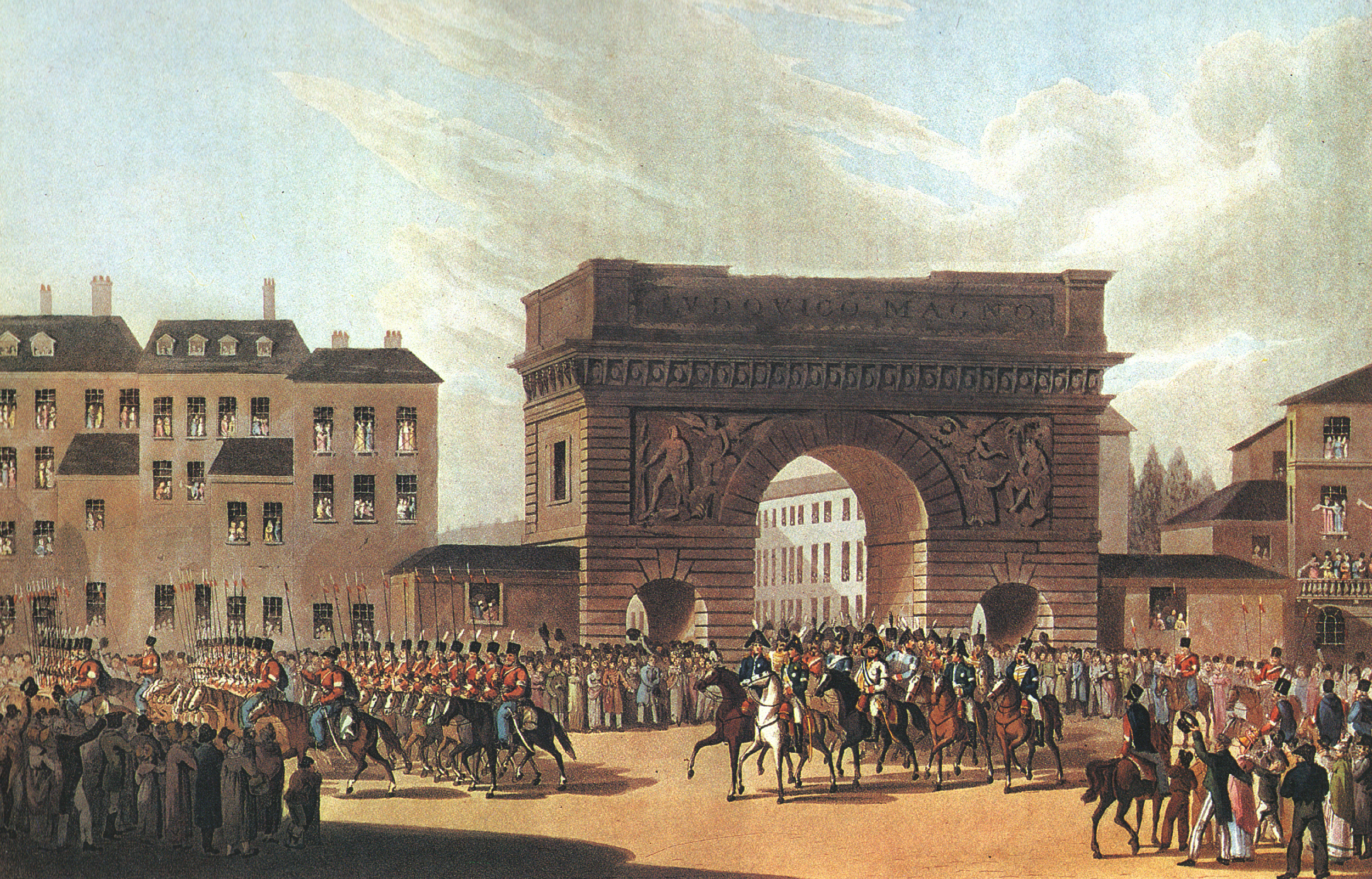
The Russian Army entering Paris in 1814

The campaign in France was marked by persistent advances made by the Russian-led forces towards Paris despite attempts by Alexander's allies to allow Napoleon an avenue for surrender. The Russians performed well in battles such as Brienne and Craonne. In a brilliant deceptive manoeuvre Alexander was able to reach, and take Paris with the help of the surrender of Marshal Marmont's beleaguered exhausted troops, before Napoleon, who was out of position and rushing to Paris to defend it, could reinforce its garrison, effectively ending the campaign. More pragmatically, in 1814 Russia, Britain, Austria, and Prussia had formed the Quadruple Alliance. The allies created an international system to maintain the territorial status quo and prevent the resurgence of an expansionist France. This included each ally maintaining a corps of occupation in France. The Quadruple Alliance, confirmed by a number of international conferences, ensured Russia's influence in Europe, if only because of the proven capability of its army to defeat that of Napoleon and to carry the war to Paris.

After the allies defeated Napoleon, Alexander played a prominent role in the redrawing of the map of Europe at the Congress of Vienna in 1815. Many of the prominent Russian commanders were feted in the European capitals, including London. In the same year, under the influence of religious mysticism, Alexander initiated the creation of the Holy Alliance, a loose agreement pledging the rulers of the nations involved—including most of Europe—to act according to Christian principles. This emerged in part due to the influence religion had played in the army during the war of 1812, and its influence on the common soldiers and officers alike.

The Russian occupation forces in France, though not participating in the Belgian campaign, re-entered combat against the minor French forces in the East and occupied several important fortresses.

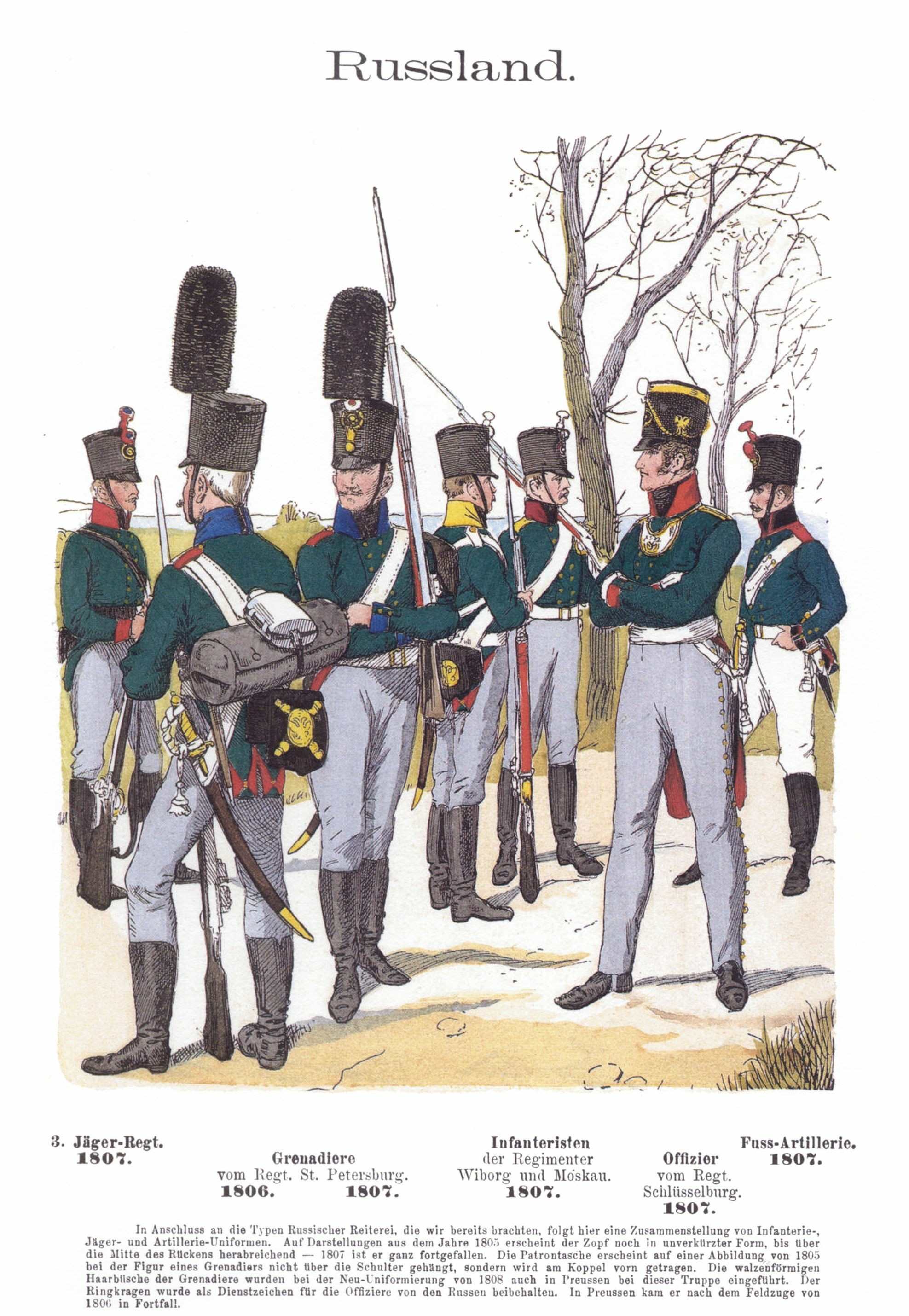
Russian infantrymen, 1806–1807

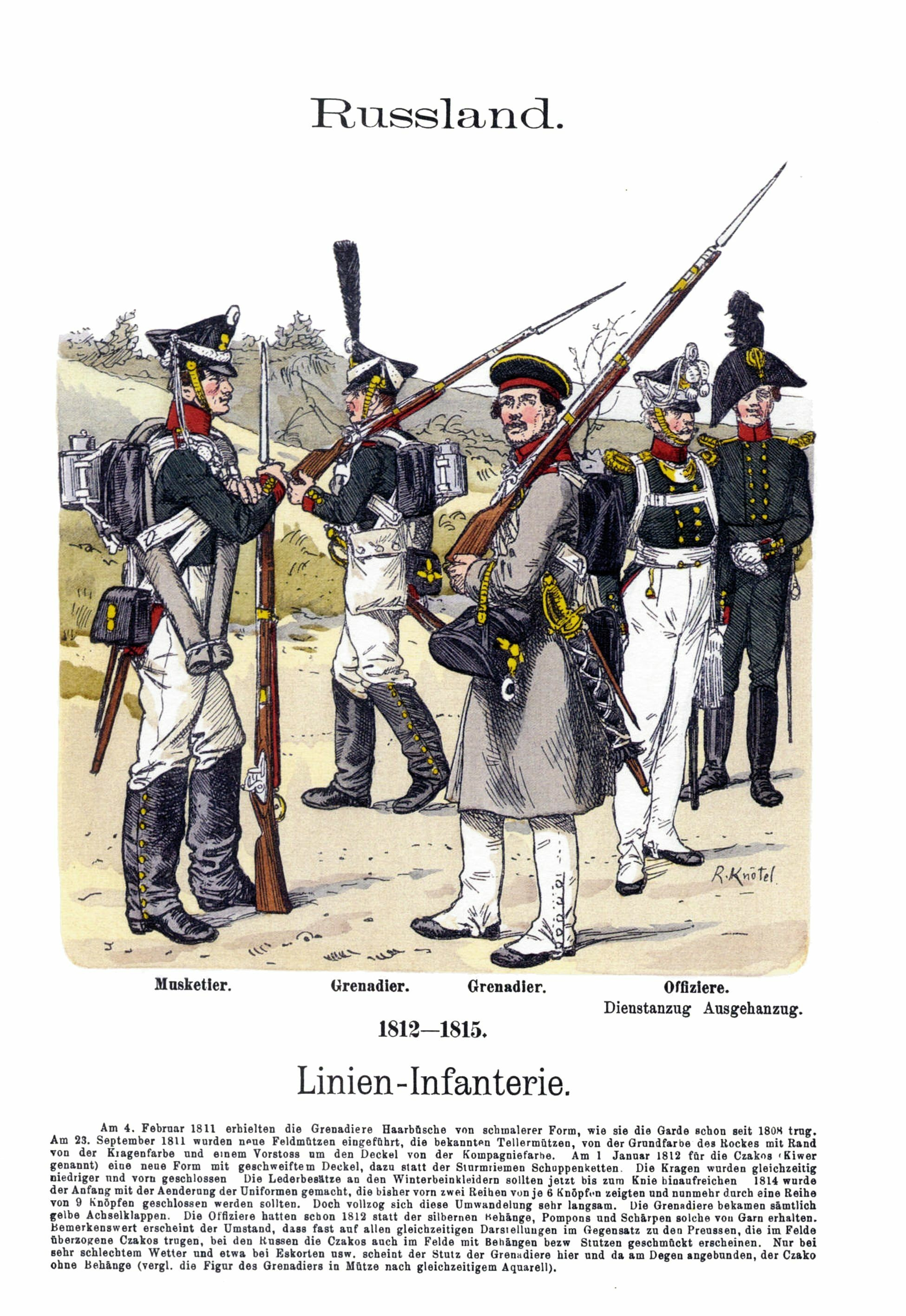
Russian line infantry, 1812–1815

=== Between the 1820s and the Crimean War ===
Following the Napoleonic Wars, Emperor Nicholas I maintained a large army to keep Russia as a major power in Europe, which at the start of the Crimean War in the 1850s numbered 1,151,319 troops. The main focus of the army was on parades and artificial war games overseen by the emperor. During the period in the title, commanders such as Ivan Paskevich and Ivan Dibich distinguished themselves, achieving success against the Turks, Poles, and Iranians.

In 1849, Russia intervened in the Hungarian revolution with 200,000 troops on the side of Austria leading to the defeat of the Hungarian Honvéd Army.

=== Further reforms ===
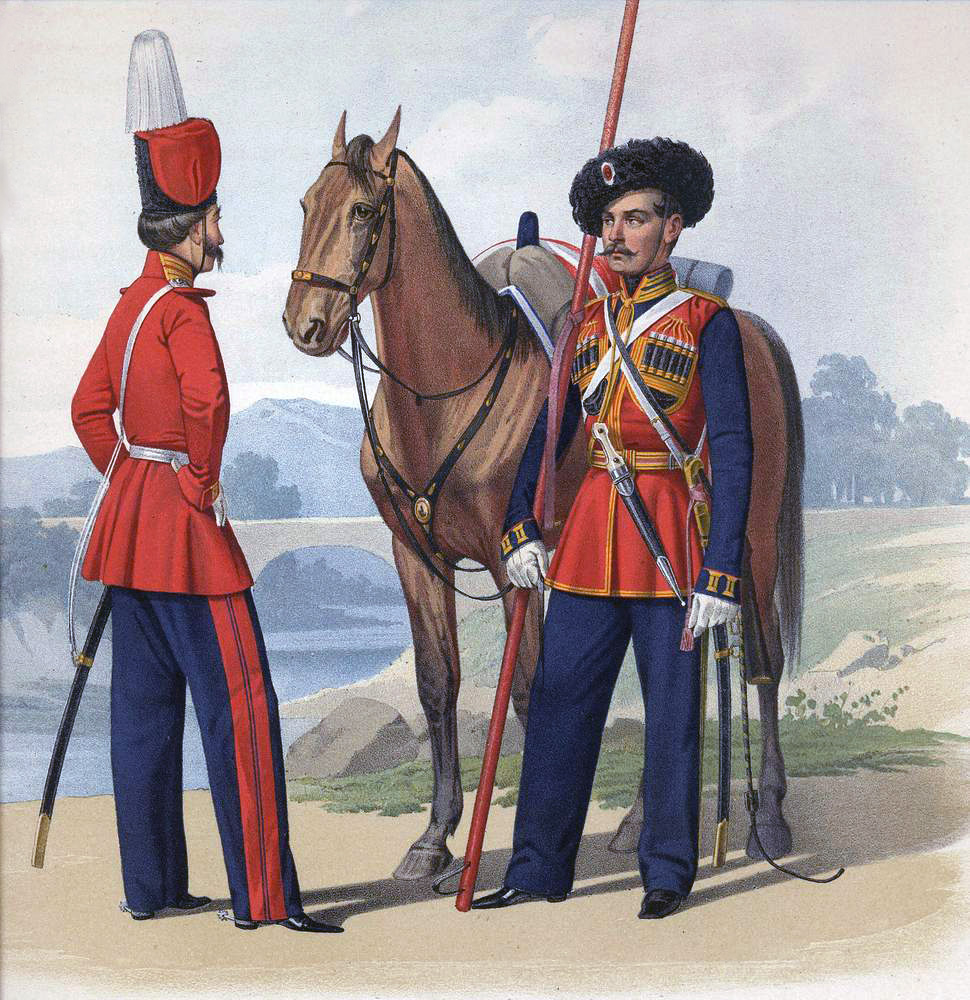
Life Guards Cossack Regiment, 1855

Following Russia's defeat in the Crimean War during the reign of Emperor Alexander II, the Minister of War, Count Dmitry Milyutin, instituted a series of military reforms, which had their basis in the emancipation of the serfs in 1861. The modernization of the Imperial Army included reorganizing the Ministry of War for better centralized leadership, the creation of new technical and support organizations, changes to finances, and the system of military training getting a complete overhaul. The Main Staff of the Army was subordinated to the Ministry of War and the Department of the General Staff became the operations section of the Main Staff. The engineering, medical, supply, and ordnance services of the army were also placed under the Ministry of War.

The last part of Milyutin's reforms focused on military recruitment and occurred in 1874. On 1 January 1874, the emperor approved a conscription statute that made military service compulsory for all 21-year-old males with the term reduced for land army to six years plus nine years in reserve. This conscription created a large pool of experienced military reservists who would be ready to mobilize in case of war. It also permitted the Russian Empire to maintain a smaller standing army in peacetime.

The system of military education was also reformed, and elementary education was made available to all the draftees. Milyutin's reforms are regarded as a milestone in the history of Russia: they dispensed with the military recruitment and professional army introduced by Peter the Great and created the Russian army such as it continued into the 21st century. Up to Dmitry Milyutin's reforms in 1874 the Russian Army had no permanent barracks and was billeted in dugouts and shacks.

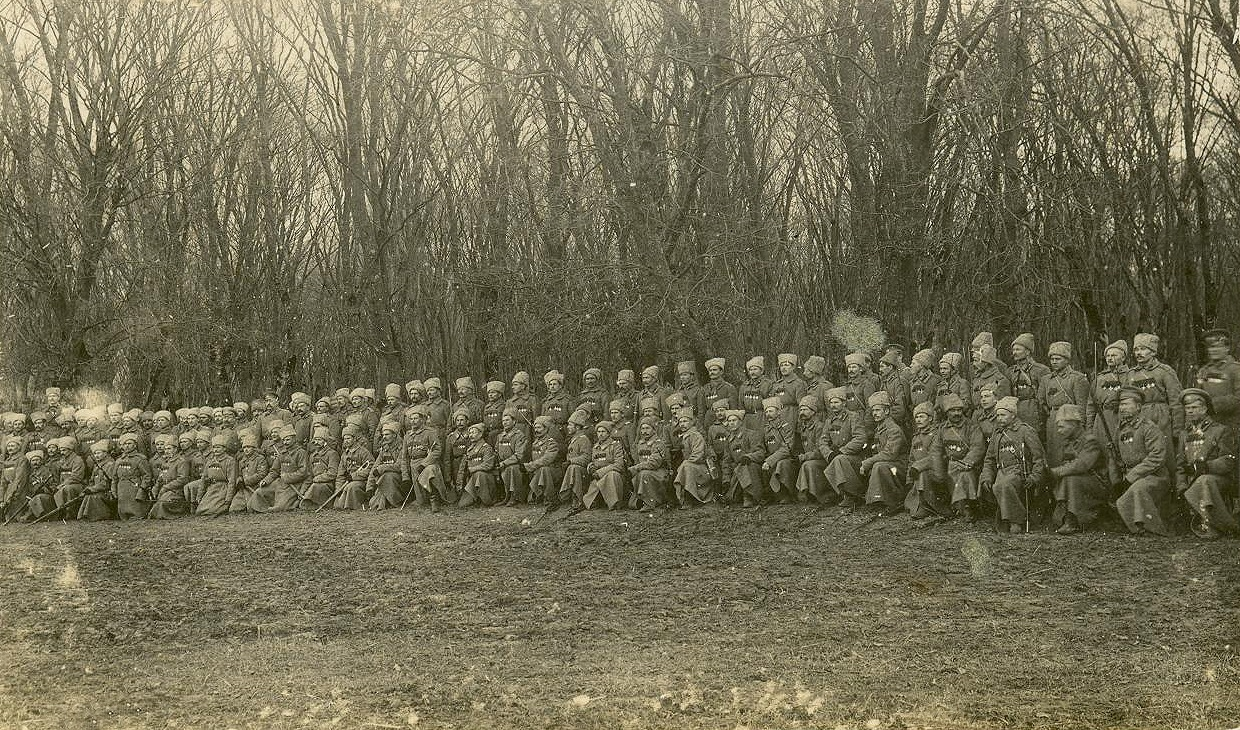
39th Tomsk Regiment, 1916

The army saw service against the Turks during the Russo-Turkish War.

During the Boxer Rebellion 100,000 Russian troops fought to pacify part of Manchuria and to secure its railroads. Some Russian military forces were already stationed in China before the war, and one of them met a grotesque end at the Battle of Pai-t'ou-tzu when the dead Russians were mutilated by Chinese troops, who decapitated them and sliced crosses into their bodies. Other battles fought include Boxers attacks on Chinese Eastern Railway, Defence of Yingkou, Battles on Amur River, and the Russian Invasion of Northern and Central Manchuria.

The army's share of the budget fell from 30% to 18% in 1881–1902. By 1904 Russia was spending 57% and 63% of what Germany and Austria-Hungary were spending on each soldier, respectively. Army morale was broken by crushing over 1,500 protests from 1883 to 1903.

The Mosin–Nagant rifle was produced in 1891 and in the same year began to be used.

The army was defeated by Japan during the Russo-Japanese War of 1904–05, notable engagements being the Siege of Port Arthur and the Battle of Mukden.

After the mobilizations in the spring of 1905, by the summer the Russian army in the Far East grew to a strength of almost one million well-equipped and -trained soldiers facing an exhausted Japanese army, but the Russian naval defeat at the Battle of Tsushima made peace talks more desirable. The first reservists to be mobilized were older men with minimal training, some of whom had never held a Mosin-Nagant rifle, while new recruits and younger reservists did not begin arriving until after the Battle of Mukden in February 1905. The mobilization for the Russo-Japanese War also brought large numbers of reservists into the ranks who were more politicized, and began spreading revolutionary ideas among the troops. There were over 400 mutinies from autumn 1905 to summer 1906.

=== World War I and revolution ===
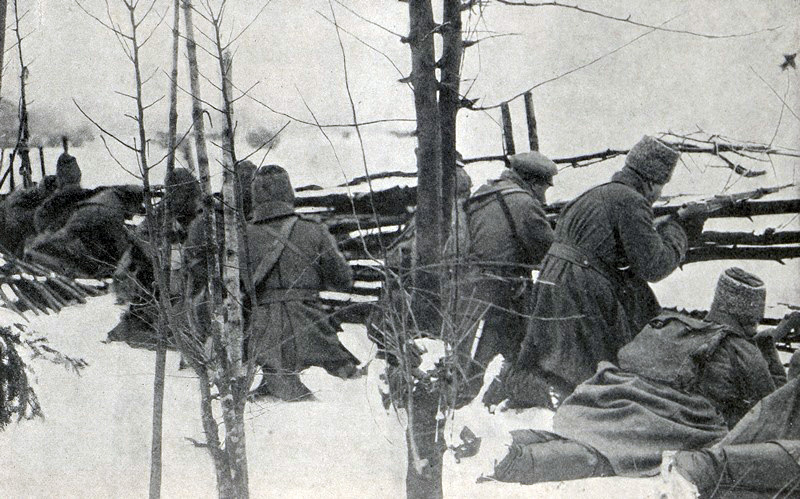
Defence of Przasnysz by the Imperial Russian Army on the Eastern Front, 1915

At the outbreak of the war, Emperor Nicholas II appointed his cousin, Grand Duke Nicholas as Commander-in-Chief. On mobilization, the Russian Army totalled 115 infantry and 38 cavalry divisions with nearly 7,900 guns (7,100 field guns, 540 field howitzers and 257 heavy guns). There were only 2 army ambulances and 679 cars. Divisions were allocated as follows: 32 infantry and 10.5 cavalry divisions to operate against Germany, 46 infantry and 18.5 cavalry divisions to operate against Austria-Hungary, 19.5 infantry and 5.5 cavalry divisions for the defence of the Baltic Sea and the Black Sea littorals, and 17 infantry and 3.5 cavalry divisions were to be transported in from Siberia and Turkestan.

Among the army's higher formations during the war were the Western Front, the Northwestern Front and the Romanian Front. The war in the East began with Russian invasion of East Prussia (1914) and the Austro-Hungarian province of Galicia (1914). The first ended in a Russian defeat by the German Empire in the Battle of Tannenberg (1914). In the west, a Russian Expeditionary Force was dispatched to France in 1915. Great success against the Austro-Germans was achieved in the Brusilov offensive. Amid the Russian Revolution of 1917 the Imperial Russian Army collapsed and dissolved. The rebellious remnants of the Imperial army evolved to become part of the new Red Army.

== Organization ==
=== Napoleonic era ===
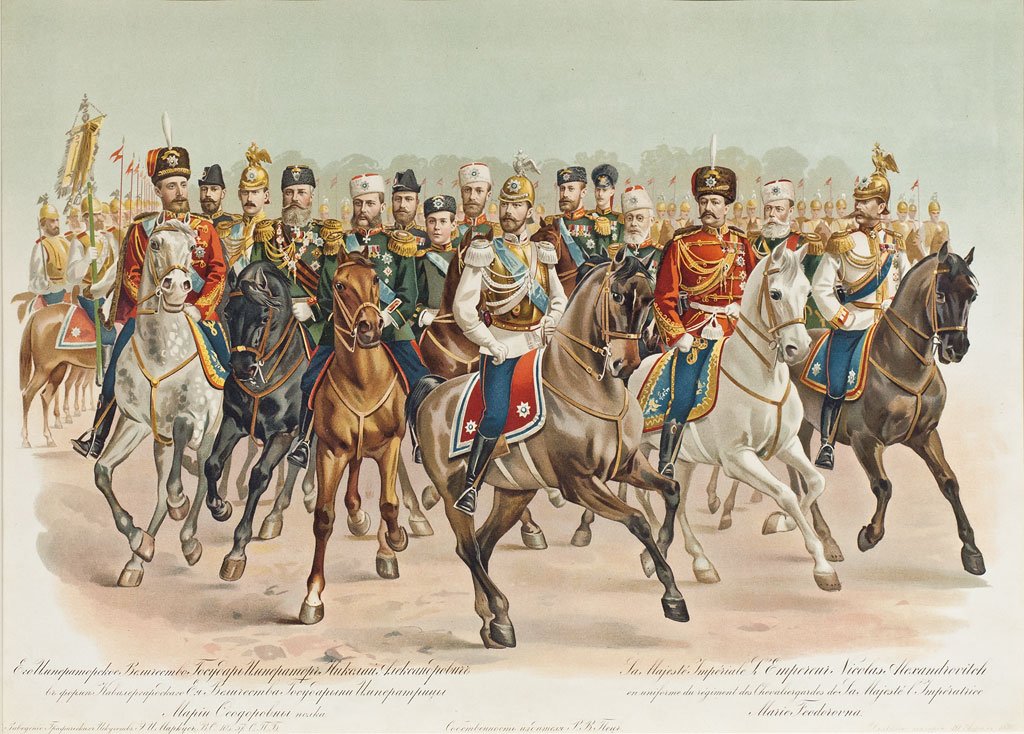
Emperor Nicholas II of Russia in the uniform of the Chevalier Guard Regiment, 1896

The Imperial Russian Army entered the Napoleonic Wars organized administratively and in the field on the same principles as it had been in the 18th century of units being assigned to campaign headquarters, and the "army" being known either for its senior commander, or the area of its operations. Administratively, the regiments were assigned to Military Inspections, the predecessors of military districts, and included the conscript training depots, garrisons and fortress troops and munitions magazines.

The army had been thoroughly reorganised on the Prussian model by the emperor's father Paul I against wishes of most of its officer corps, and with his demise immediate changes followed to remove much of the Prussianness from its character. Although the army had conventional European parts within it such as the monarch's guard, the infantry and cavalry of the line and field artillery, it also included a very large contingent of semi-regular Cossacks that in times of rare peace served to guard the Russian Empire's southern borders, and in times of war served as fully-fledged light cavalry, providing invaluable reconnaissance service often far better than that available to other European armies due to the greater degree of initiative and freedom of movement by Cossack detachments. The Ukrainian lands of the Empire also provided most of the Hussar and Ulan regiments for the regular light cavalry. Another unusual feature of the army that was seen twice during the period was the constitution of the Narodnoe Opolcheniye, for the first time since the coming to power of the Romanov dynasty.

In 1806, most of the Inspections were abolished, and replaced by divisions based on the French model although still territorially based. By 1809, there were 25 infantry divisions as permanent field formations, each organised around three infantry brigade and one artillery brigade. When Barclay de Tolly became the Minister of War in 1810, he instituted further reorganization and other changes in the army, down to company level, that saw the creation of separate grenadier divisions, and dedication of one brigade in each division to the jaeger light infantry for skirmishing in open order formations.

The Nikolaev General Staff Academy was established in 1832 with the involvement of Antoine-Henri Jomini, a Swiss officer in Russian service, to prepare General Staff officers, though it did not have a significant role in the army until the post-Crimean War reforms.

==== Imperial Guard ====
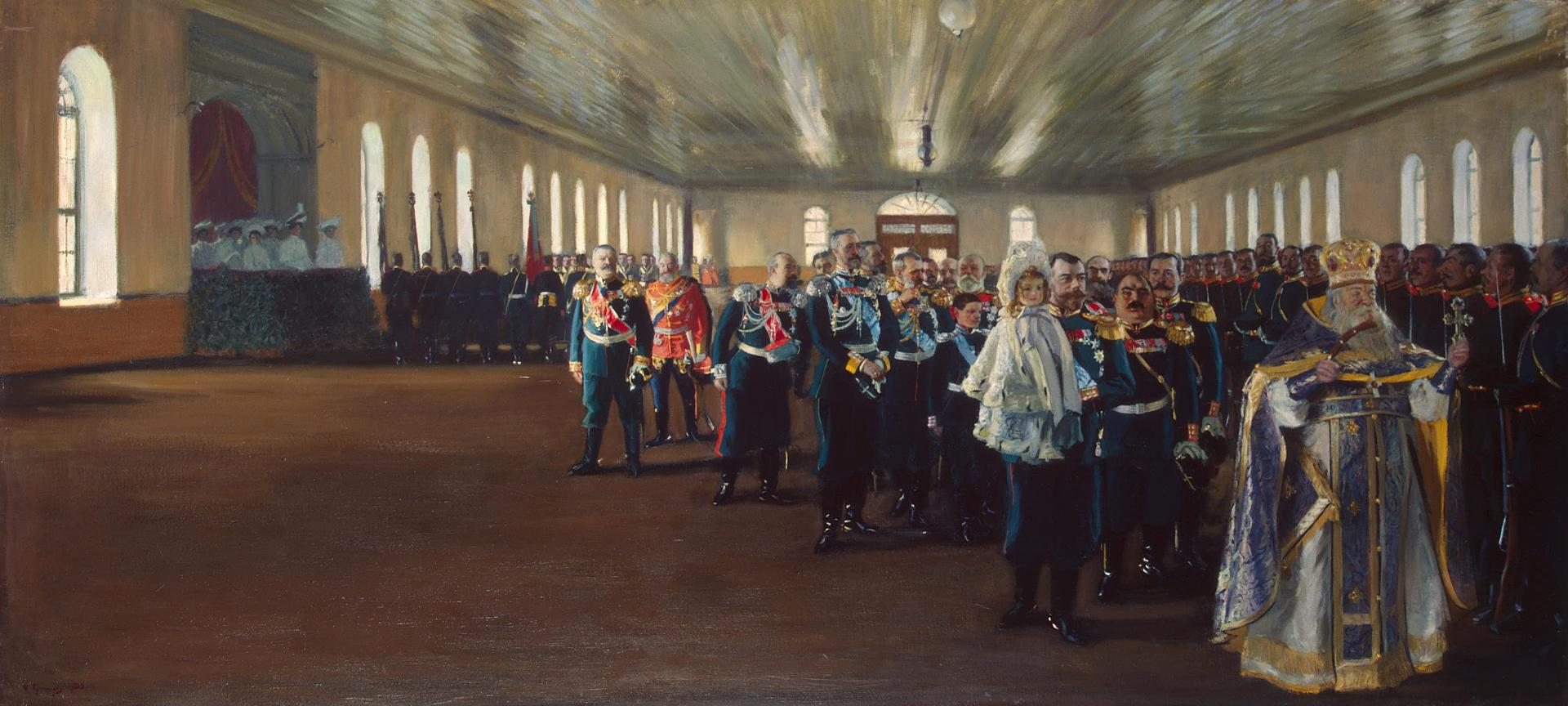
Church parade of the Finland Guard Regiment, 1905

Guards units were tasked with protecting the Russian Emperor (the tsar) and the Imperial family. Throughout the Napoleonic Wars the Imperial Russian Guard was commanded by Grand Duke Konstantin. The guard grew from a few regiments to two infantry divisions combined into the V Infantry Corps commanded at Borodino by General Lieutenant Lavrov and two cavalry divisions with their own artillery and train by the conclusion of the 1814 campaign.

At Austerlitz in 1805 the artillery of the Guard included the Lifeguard Artillery Battalion under General Major Ivan Kaspersky. At Borodino in 1812 the artillery of the Guard included the Lifeguard Artillery Brigade (now a part of the Guard Infantry Division), the Lifeguard Horse Artillery under Colonel Kozen, attached to the 1st Cuirassier Division, and the Guard Sapper Battalion.

At Austerlitz in 1805 the Lifeguard Cossack regiment (five sotnias) was attached to the 1st Brigade of the Guard Cavalry Division. At Borodino in 1812 the Cossacks of the Guard included the Lifeguard Cossack regiment (five sotnias), the Black Sea Cossack Guard sotnia, and the Lifeguard Orel sotnia.

=== World War I ===
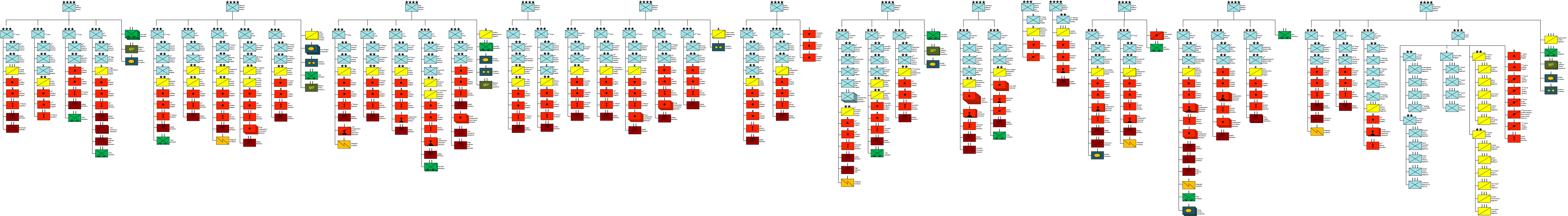
Organization of the Imperial Russian Army, 28 June 1914

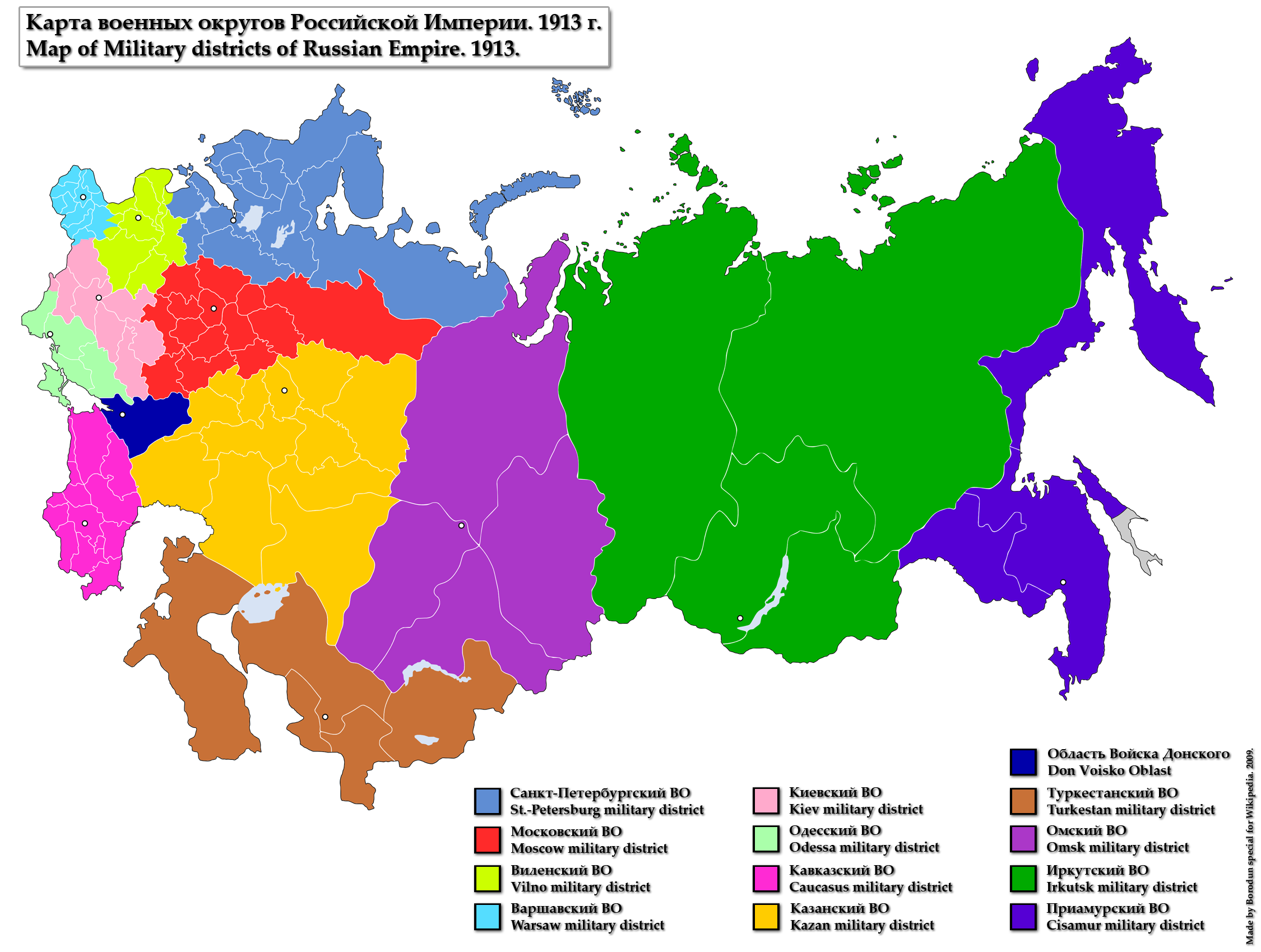
Russian military districts in 1913

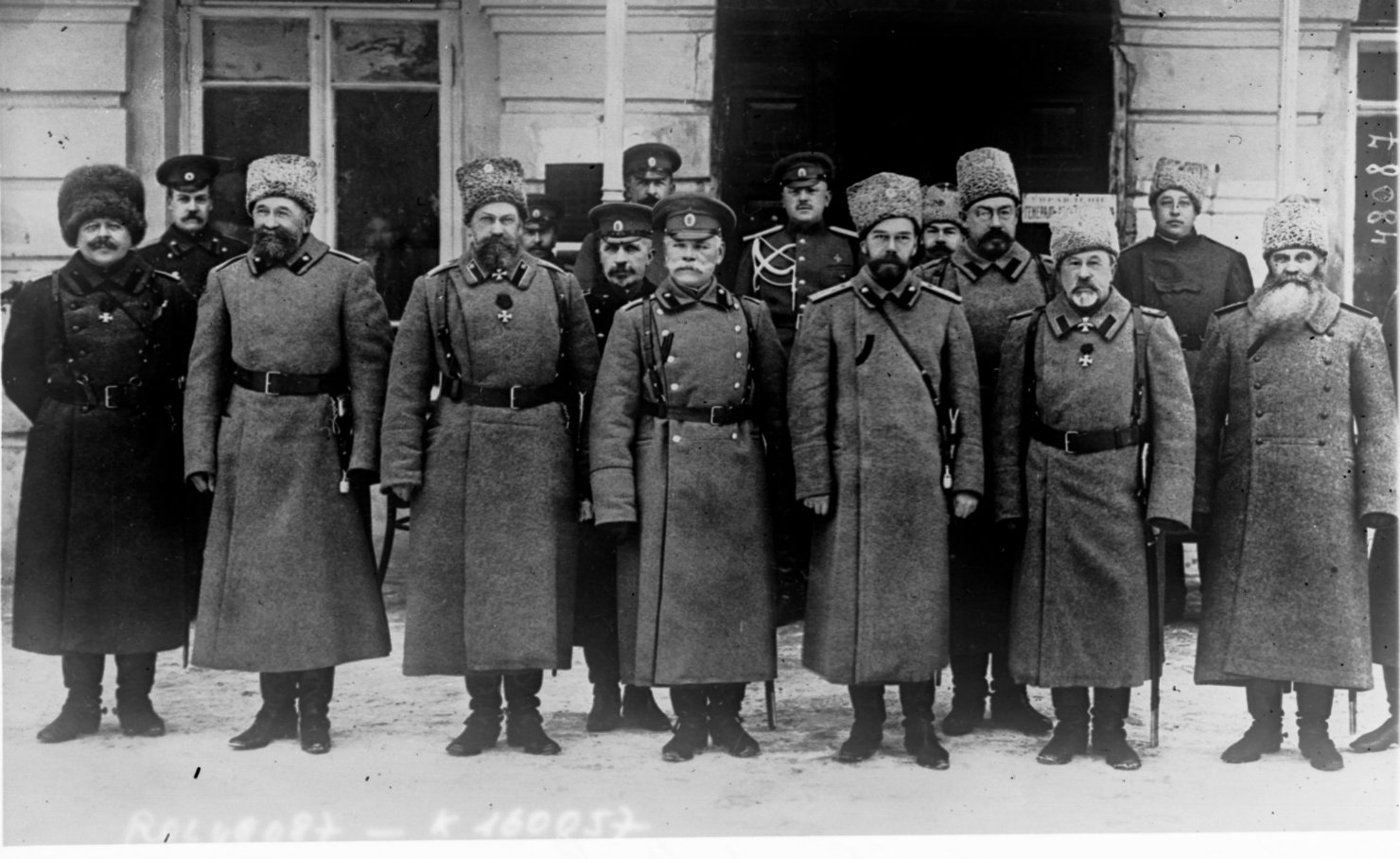
Emperor Nicholas II and Stavka generals, 1916

==== Administration and high command ====
The Emperor of Russia was the commander-in-chief of the armed forces while the Ministry of War was responsible for carrying out his orders. By 1913, the War Ministry included the Military Council that advised the Emperor and was headed by the War Minister; the General Staff responsible for military operations and divided into six branches, which included the Quartermaster-General's branch, military communications, military topography, organization and training, and mobilization; an administrative headquarters staff; a military technical directorate; and inspector-generals for infantry, cavalry, artillery, engineers, military training, and railway troops. In 1909 the infantry inspectorate was abolished and replaced with a musketry inspectorate.

The Russian General Staff originated during the Napoleonic Wars and the beginning of mass armies, but it did not develop into an important and prestigious institution within the military until after the Crimean War, and even more so after the Russo-Turkish War of 1877-78, when General Staff officers had a major role in achieving victory. In 1865 the General Staff became the operations section of the Main Staff of the War Ministry, while the latter oversaw organization, training, intelligence, mobilization, and coordinating all branches of the army.

The Russian Empire was organized into 12 military districts for recruiting and mobilization. The head of a military district had both civil and military powers, and answered to the Minister of War. Recruiting was done throughout the military districts of the Empire on the basis of 208 recruiting districts, which corresponded to one of the 208 line infantry regiments. But this system was not entirely territorial, as it was estimated only 30 percent of recruits in each regiment came from their corresponding district.

==== Field organization ====
The forces in the field were led by a Supreme Commander appointed by the Emperor. He was assisted by a headquarters staff comprising a Chief of Staff, the Quartermaster-General's department, the Adjutant-General's department, and the railway department. The Quartermaster-General assisted with operations; the Adjutant-General assisted with organization and personnel, and also oversaw the medical services, chaplains, lines of communication, and military police; and the chief of the railway department organized the railways in the theater of war and assisted the lines of communication. The field army was the largest field command prior to World War I. In wartime, several armies could operate together under one command as an army group. An army consisted of 3–5 army corps, 1–2 cavalry corps, 3 batteries of heavy artillery, 1 squadron of field gendarmerie, 1 wireless telegraph company, and various support and technical units, such as hospitals, supply trains, artillery and siege parks, pontoon units, and an airplane detachment. Senior members of the field army headquarters besides the commander and his chief of staff were the Quartermaster-General, the Adjutant-General, the general of communications, the chief of supply, the inspectors of artillery and of engineers, the chief paymaster, and the chief controller.

There were a total of 37 army corps as of 1913, while cavalry corps did not exist in peacetime. In peacetime the corps included: 1st to 25th Army Corps, the Guard Corps, the Grenadier Corps, 1st to 3rd Caucasian Corps, 1st and 2nd Turkestan Corps, and the 1st to 5th Siberian Corps. The composition of each varied, though the normal army corps had 2 infantry divisions, 1 cavalry division, attached howitzers, a sapper battalion, and administrative troops. The Turkestan Corps had 2 or 3 rifle brigades and the Siberian Corps had 2 rifle divisions. When formed in wartime, a cavalry corps would consist of 2 cavalry divisions and a supply column. Some corps also had attached pontoon battalions, wireless telegraph companies, and an air squadron. A corps headquarters included, besides the commander and his chief of staff and aides-de-camp, the commandant of headquarters (head of military police), inspector of corps artillery, the corps supply chief, engineer, surgeon, veterinary surgeon, paymaster, and controller.

The regiment was considered the basic unit of the Russian Army and its most important social organization. One historian described this: "On joining it, the conscript and officer alike entered a 'family' with its own traditions, distinctive way of doing things, and corporate existence. Its connection with other similar units was based on particular instances of past glories, a common allegiance to the tsar and—despite religious diversity—the ideal of an Orthodox empire." A Russian infantry regiment consisted of about 4,000 men organized into four battalions, which had 16 companies of 250 men each. A cavalry regiment was organized into squadrons and companies, and an artillery brigade was organized into battalions and batteries. All administration was done at the regimental level, while battalions were only tactical units, and the regiment was commanded by a colonel for line infantry or a major general for the Imperial Guards. Regimental commanders had many responsibilities, which included managing the pay of the troops and other finances, promoting soldiers and recommending officers for promotion, granting leaves of absence, and training the individual soldier and the regiment as a unit. The majority of the regiments were stationed either on the borders of Prussia and Austria-Hungary or on the frontiers of Siberia, Central Asia, or the Caucasus Mountains, while a smaller number of them were in the Russian interior.

==== Personnel ====
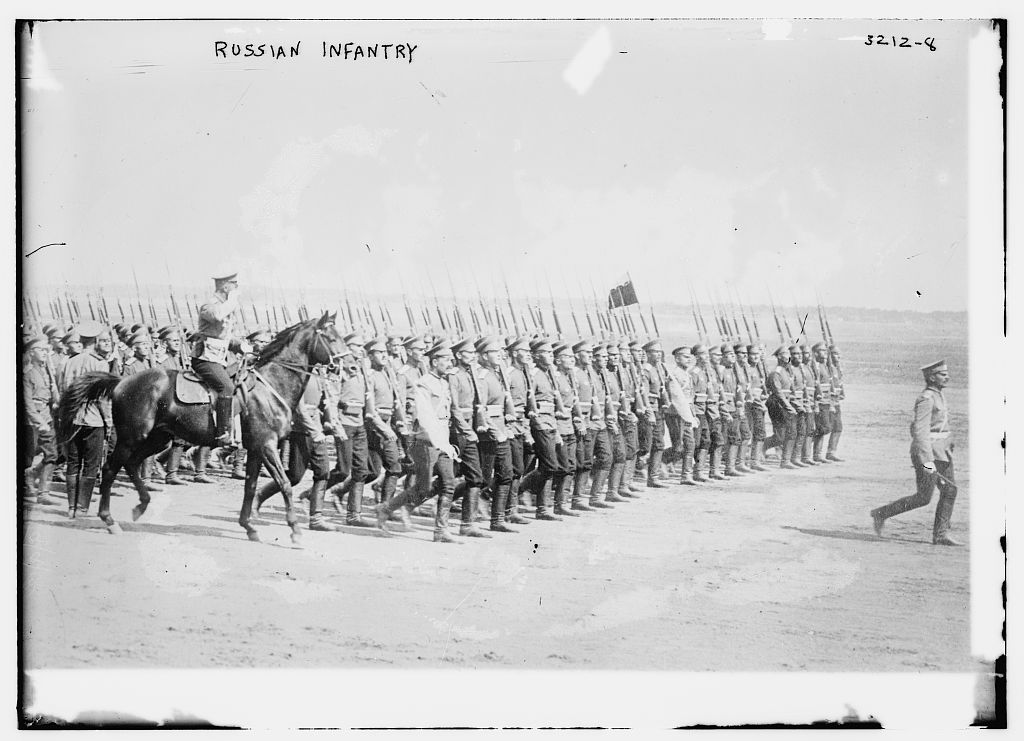
Russian soldiers at the start of World War I

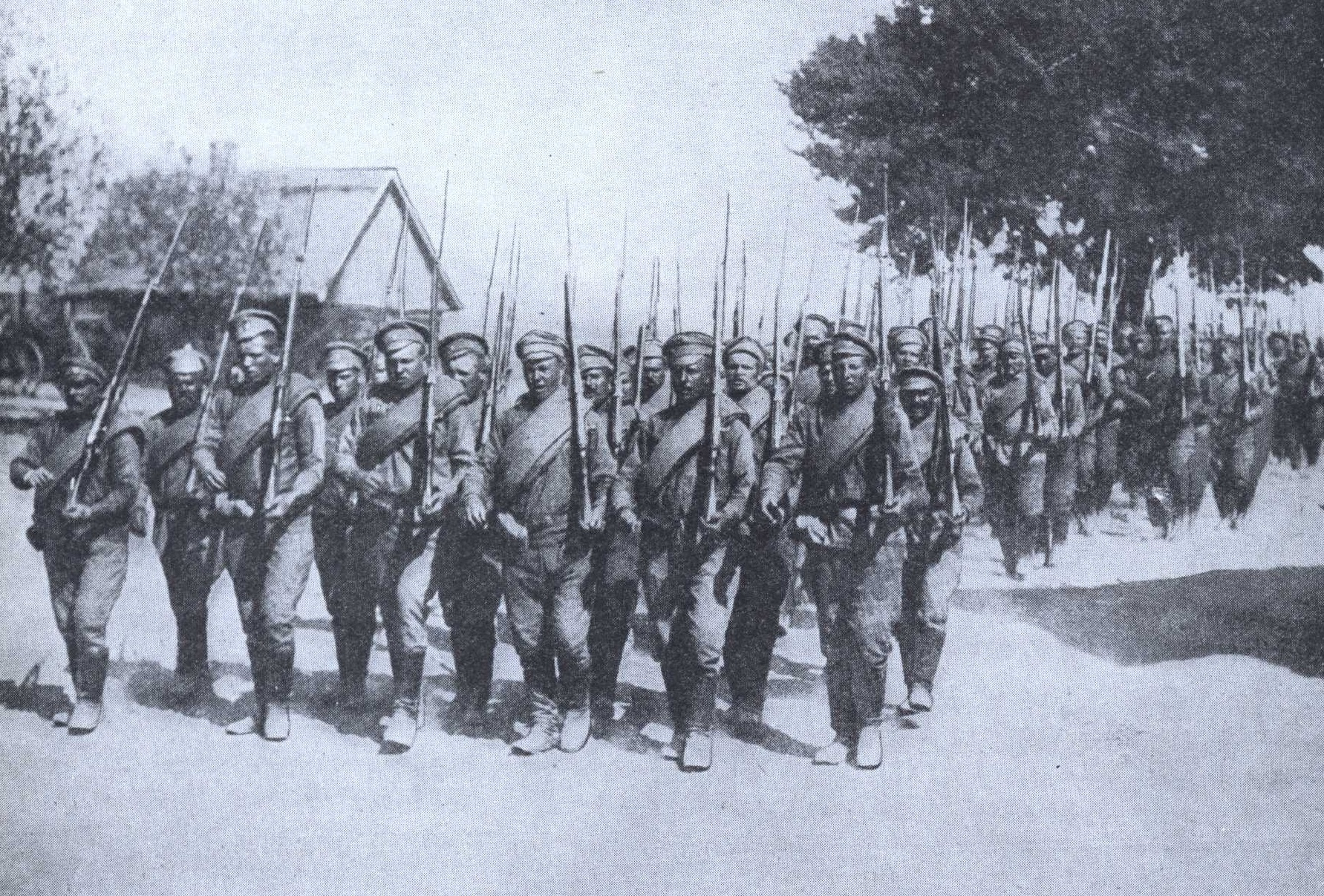
Russian soldiers in Galicia, 1915

The peacetime strength of the Imperial Army was estimated in 1913 to be around 1,300,000, including 811,000 infantrymen, 133,000 cavalrymen, 209,000 artillerymen (and 3,904 guns), 59,000 engineers, and 88,000 support and auxiliary troops. This made it the largest peacetime standing army in Europe on the eve of World War I. The war mobilization in 1914 increased this to 4,500,000 troops, while the officers were increased from 40,000 to 80,000. An estimate in 1913 put the total active and reserve troops of the Russian Army at 5,962,396, including first and second line reservists that were never on active duty.

Before the start of World War I the intake of conscripts was around half a million annually. For instance, in 1911 a total of 455,000 men were called up for service, out of which 10,000 went to the navy, 14,500 to the border guard, and the remaining 430,500 to the army.

===== Enlisted =====
The decree of 14 January 1874 (Note: Also amended by the decrees of 27 June 1888, 1 February 1893, and 6 July 1912.) mandated military service across the Russian Empire for men between the ages of 21 and 43, with a few exceptions: the Grand Duchy of Finland was exempt from conscription entirely in exchange for an annual financial payment, Cossacks served on their own separate terms, and Muslim populations in territories like Dagestan or Turkestan were also exempt, though they could volunteer in special units and the militia. The Christian inhabitants of those lands were still subject to the draft like the Russian population elsewhere. Some other small territories were exempt: certain tribes or districts in Arkhangelsk, Orenburg, Stavropol, Astrakhan, and Eastern Siberia. Only a few units were recruited using volunteers, otherwise conscription provided most of the troops. The post-Crimean War reforms extended conscription to the nobility as enlisted soldiers unless they chose to become an officer. Conscripts who were called up in the annual lottery could serve for a term of one, two, three, or six years, depending on their education level. The 1874 conscription law replaced earlier practice of drafting peasants into lifetime service. Having short-term conscripts also created a pool of reservists that could be mobilized in wartime.

The Russian Army had a regimental system that is sometimes compared to the British Army, but there were significant differences. Soldiers were mostly conscripts rather than volunteers and were frequently assigned to regiments that were not in their home region. Non-commissioned officers were promoted from among the conscripts and were relatively few, as they tended to not stay in the army. The ethos of the army was summarized by its motto "for faith, tsar, and fatherland," and the main value that was instilled in the soldiers was obedience to the officers and ultimately to the Emperor. Much less emphasis was placed on other military values, such as camaraderie or accomplishing missions. With the end of serfdom, by the end of the 19th century peasant conscripts were being joined by a growing number of working-class men from urban areas. Nobles were slightly less than one percent of conscripted soldiers during this time. The soldiers were expected by their officers to be accepting of bad living conditions and were often looked down on by the noble-born officers because of class differences, though some others saw themselves as "father-commanders" of their troops. Military regulations regarded soldiers to be second-class citizens. By the end of the century, as conscripts entering the army were no longer serfs, and with some being from urban areas and literate, they started having higher expectations for how they were treated and a stronger conception of their rights.

Basic training for Russian soldiers included weapons training, drill, and fieldcraft, followed by small unit tactics, and then by larger maneuvers involving formations from several military districts. Rifle shooting from a distance was particularly emphasized during the training. The majority of the troops were Orthodox Christian ethnic Russians, Ukrainians, and Belarusians, with smaller numbers of Lutheran Estonians and Baltic Germans, Catholic Poles and Lithuanians, Eastern Catholic Ukrainians, Muslim Tatars, or Jews. A soldier's religious affiliation was immediately established once he arrived at the regiment because that determined how he was sworn in. The regimental priest was always Russian Orthodox, but there were also Catholic priests, Jewish rabbis, and Muslim imams or prayer leaders who were brought in to administer the oath to the non-Orthodox.

===== Officers =====
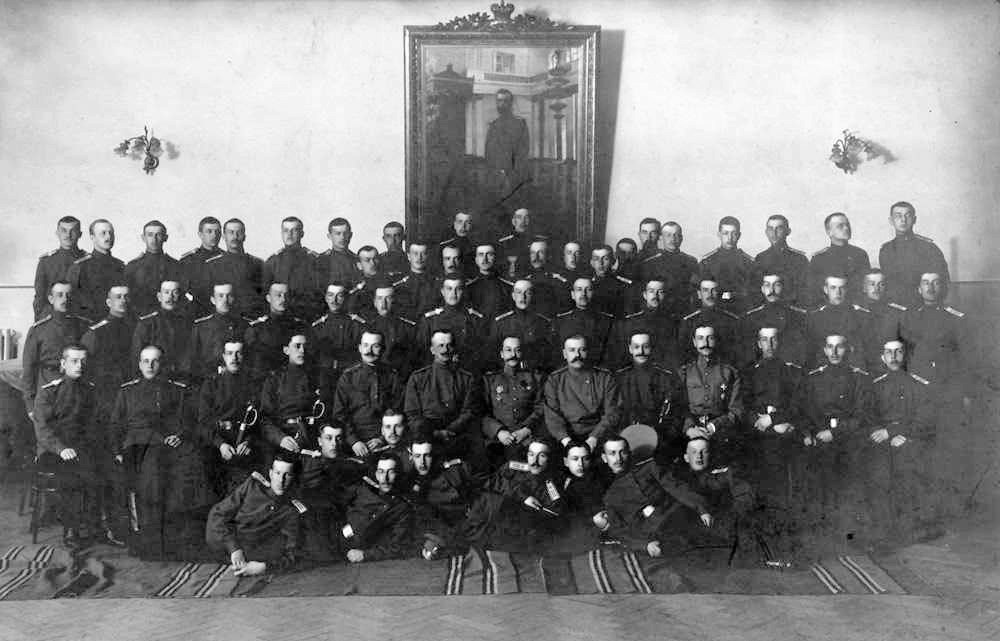
Class of the Junker School of Vladimir, 1916

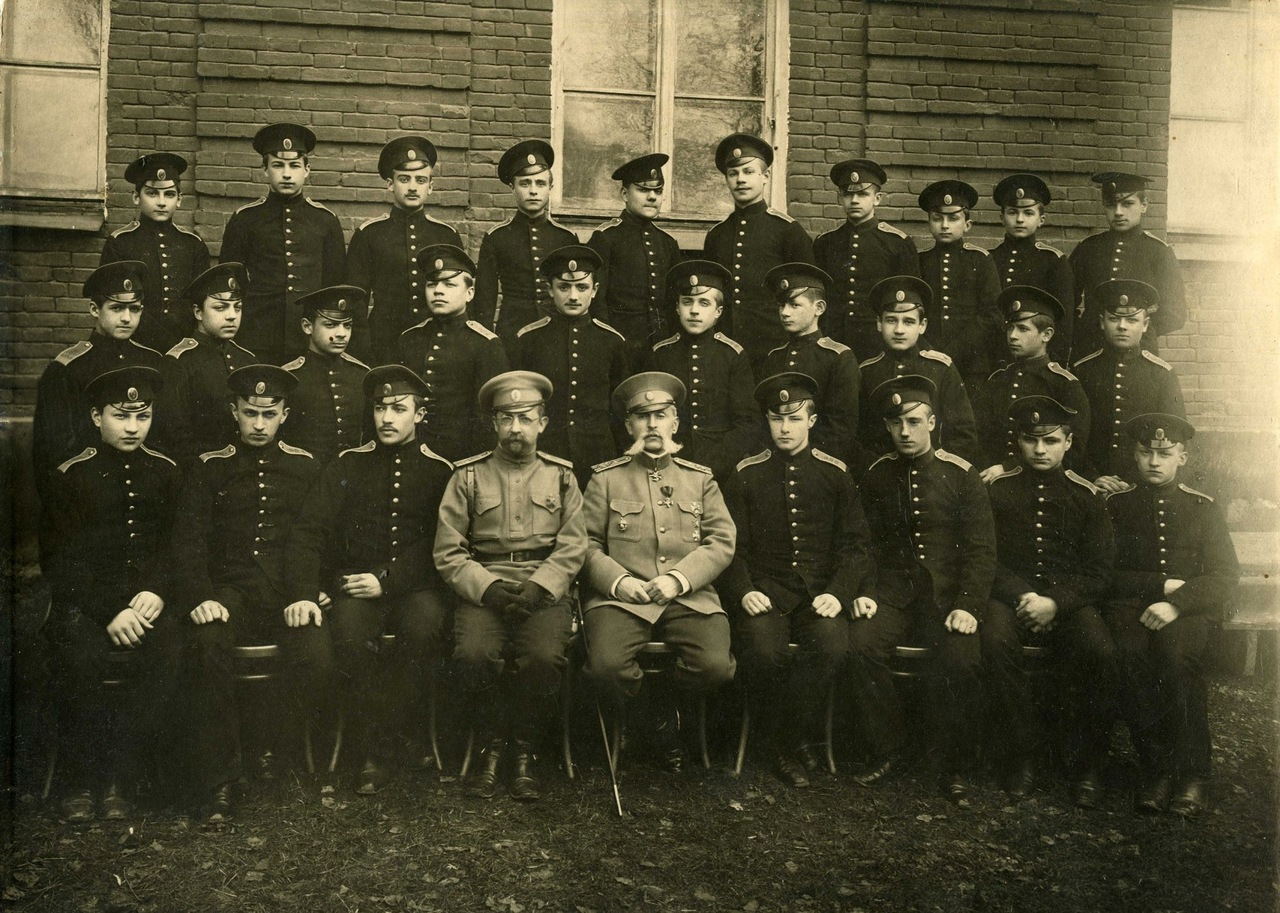
Poltava Cadet Corps, 1904

Officers in the Imperial Army were commissioned from either the Page Corps, one of the 29 cadet corps, or one of the 20 junker and military schools. In 1910 the junker (pronounced yunker) schools were re-designated as military schools. As of 1913 the schools included 11 infantry, 2 Cossack, 3 cavalry, 3 artillery, and 1 engineer school. When they were founded in the 1860s there were 11 infantry, 2 cavalry, 1 Cossack, and 2 mixed infantry-cavalry schools. The entry requirements and the length of training depended on the individual school and the specialty. After being commissioned for at least four years, interested officers also had the opportunity to apply to the Nikolaev General Staff Academy, which required passing the competitive entrance examinations. General Staff officers, who became a branch within the army with their own title and insignia after the Milyutin reforms, were the only officers in the army devoted to the intellectual study of war. They became an elite within the officer corps, even rivaling the prestigious status of the Imperial Guard officers.

Junker schools were created by Dmitry Milyutin's reforms after the Crimean War and became the largest source of officers, being open to both educated commoners and nobles who spent one year serving in a regiment first. They had a two-year course, with the first year being general education followed by military subjects in the second year. Candidates that failed the entrance exam were required to serve the rest of their enlistment as regular soldiers. Milyutin intended for junker schools to provide lower level officers who would not receive a command higher than battalion level, though some advanced to become generals, such as Mikhail Alekseyev and Anton Denikin. The graduates of junker schools often had a lesser nobility or commoner background.

The cadet corps provided a four- or five-year education to the sons of the wealthy landed nobility, which included both academics and military subjects. Cadets were given the option upon graduation to apply to a regiment, work in the civil service, go to a specialty military school (such as engineering or artillery), or to join the individual reserve. Those with the highest grades were able to be assigned to a Guards regiment. The Page Corps was the most elite and prestigious cadet corps. Cadets there were able to meet and serve members of the Romanov dynasty and had the option of being assigned to a Guards unit or to any other unit in the Imperial Army when they graduated.

Milyutin's post-Crimean War reforms expanded recruitment into the officer corps from the nobility to the peasantry, and the basis for becoming an officer was a candidate's education level rather than social class. The share of non-noble officers increased from 4 percent in the 1860s to 44.6 percent in the 1890s, and just over half of the officers below the rank of captain were commoners by 1912. The general ranks remained overwhelmingly dominated by hereditary nobles, who were 91.9 percent of generals in the 1890s. It took three decades for the public education system that was available for the commoners in Russia to become effective at preparing students to pass admission tests for military schools, so the nobility still had an advantage by having access to higher quality private education.

Before the Milyutin reforms, the only way for a peasant conscript to become an officer was by being promoted after demonstrating good conduct, intelligence, and potential ability to command. A soldier chosen to become an officer would first spend several years as an unteroffizier (non-commissioned officer) to be tested, then promoted to praporshchik, which represented the start of an officer apprenticeship. For nobles, the most common method would be to commission by joining a regiment directly as a junker, who served in the same role as NCOs, then to be promoted to praporshchik and begin their officer apprenticeship. Graduates of one of the cadet corps started off as a praporshchik. Another possibility was being commissioned by an imperial decree. About 75 percent of officers started by joining a regiment as a junker, and the remainder were cadet corps graduates. The Milyutin reforms ended the method of joining a regiment as a junker. Instead, a new role was created called one-year volunteer, by which both nobles and commoners could apply to serve in the role of an unteroffizier and a praporshchik over the course of one year before either becoming an officer in the reserve militia or going to a junker school. The volunteer option did not produce a large number of officers, but it was the main source of reserve officers, and many of them were university students with revolutionary views.

==== Reserve and auxiliary troops ====
The army reserve (zapas) was known as the state militia (opolcheniye) and consisted of two categories: first line reservists were men between the ages of 21 and 43 who either completed active service, or those who were not called up by the annual lottery but were fit for service. The second line reservists were men in the same demographic who were not considered fit enough for combat roles, but who were still able bodied. Some members of the first line reserve had an obligation of two trainings lasting six weeks each at most. Upon mobilization, the first line would be used to augment the standing army while the second line would form rear area and support units. Reserve officers were called volunteers and were men with a certain level of education who may serve a short term on active service and then join the reserve. They received the rank of ensign (praporshchik).

== Ethnic and religious minorities ==
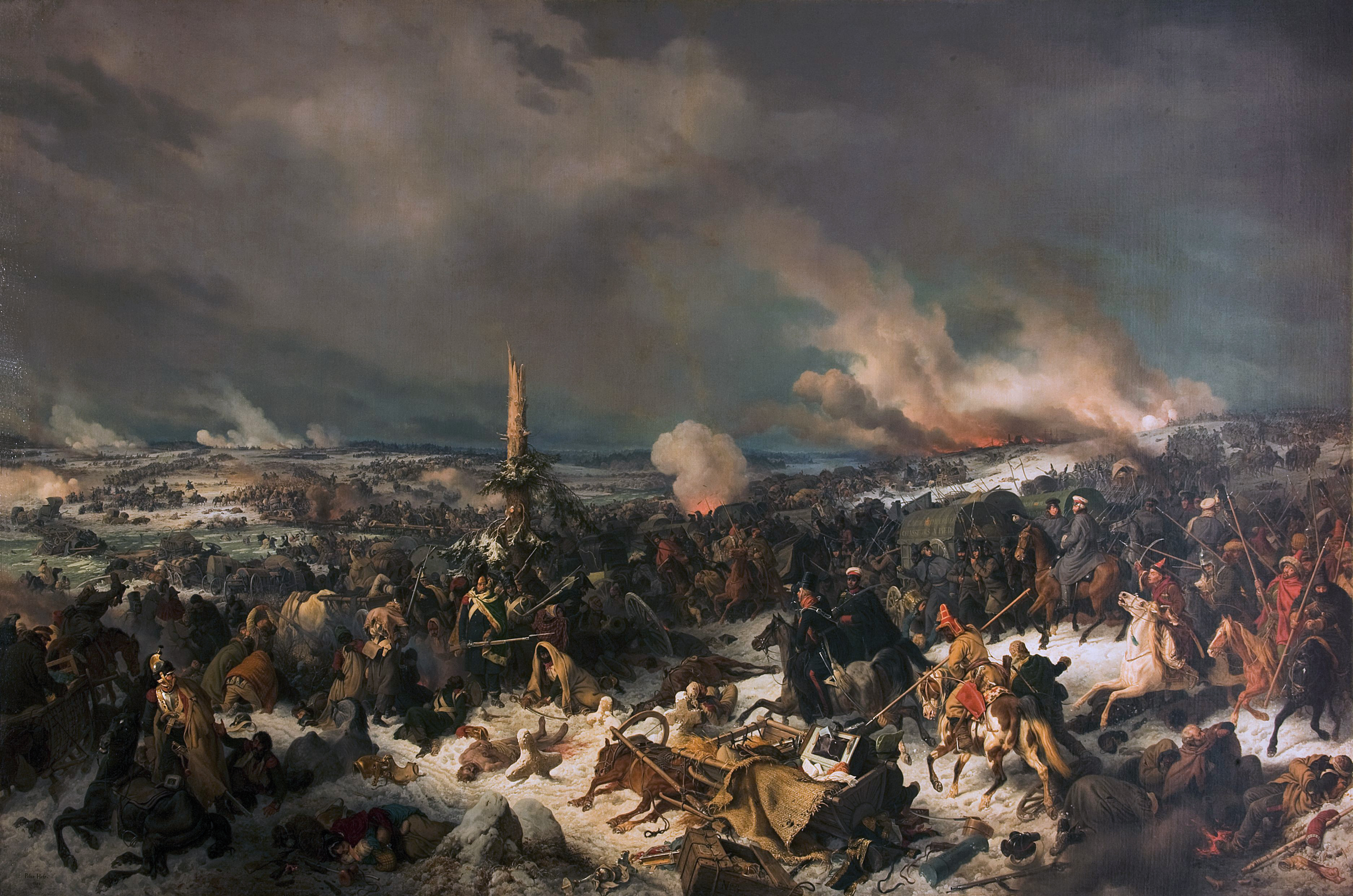
Crossing the Berezina River by Peter von Hess. Cossacks and Bashkirs attacking French troops at the Berezina in November 1812

The Ministry of War had a policy to keep the soldiers of non-Orthodox Russian, Ukrainian, or Belarusian origin as no more than 30 percent of any regiment, and no more than 26 percent of the regiments that were stationed on the Empire's western border. Although the War Ministry preferred to keep regiments as at least two-thirds to three-quarters Orthodox Russian, an effort was made to ensure harmony in units by encouraging soldiers of all religions and backgrounds to treat each other with respect, as stated in the Russian Soldier's Catechism.

Among the cultural and religious groups, the Cossacks and the Muslims in particular served under unique sets of regulations.

=== Cossacks ===
Emperor Nicholas II and his son Alexei wearing Kuban Cossack uniforms, including the cherkesska

The Cossacks, who originated as Slavs that chose to live on the steppe instead of integrate with either the tsardom of Russia or the Polish–Lithuanian Commonwealth, were organized into several voisko (hosts) named after the regions of their location across the Russian Empire, whether along the Russian border, or internal borders between Russian and non-Russian peoples. After their rebellious early history, from the 18th century on the Russian Imperial government saw these cavalrymen as useful border guards and created new hosts on the Russian frontier as it expanded into Siberia, the Caucasus, and Central Asia. Each new host developed its own traditions, and was led by a core of leaders taken from existing hosts, who presided over new Cossacks that were either peasants, discharged soldiers, or members of the local population. The Cossacks distinguished themselves in service to the Russian Empire during the French invasion of 1812, when they were effective at raiding French troops on the retreat from Moscow. After the Napoleonic Wars the Russian government created an image of Cossack loyalty to the Romanov dynasty, and in 1827 Emperor Nicholas I declared his heir, the tsarevich, the honorary ataman of all Cossacks. In 1832 the Cossack hosts were given ownership of their territories as Imperial lands in return for military service.

The 1875 law on military conscription defined all Cossack men between the ages of 21 and 33 as active duty soldiers. As they got beyond this age they served as first line and then second line reservists in the militia. Cossacks were required to provide their own uniform, horses, and saddles, though the Russian government began giving them subsidies as they faced financial problems in the late 19th century. The Cossack hosts east of the Ural Mountains never became economically self-sufficient, and increasingly the older hosts in southern Russia also needed government support. During the Russo-Japanese War all active Siberian, Transbaikal, Amur, and Ussuri Cossacks were mobilized and sent to Manchuria, along with some reservists. After the outbreak of the Russian Revolution of 1905 the government used them as mounted police and mobilized nearly all Cossack regiments in the empire. Emperor Nicholas II praised them for their service and gave out medals and cash bonuses. A new unit, the Combined Cossack Life Guards Regiment, was created so that every Cossack host was represented among the Imperial Guard. Despite their popular image as janissaries of the tsarist government, some of them opposed being used to put down protests and wanted more autonomy.

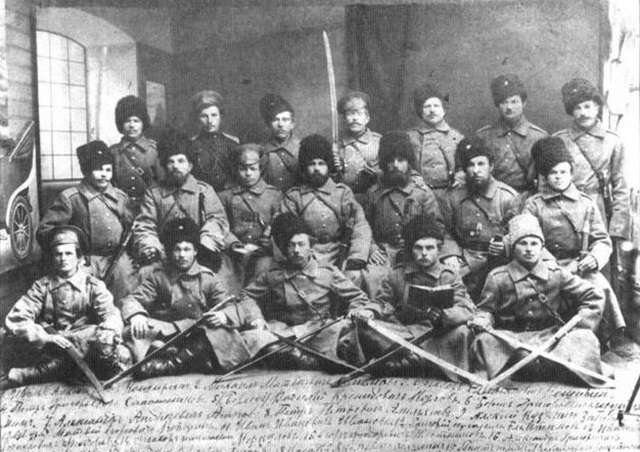
Orenburg Cossacks during the Russo-Japanese War

Cossacks were mobilized at the outbreak of World War I. During the war the Cossacks made up two-thirds of Russian army cavalry, contributing over 500,000 men for the war effort. Out of these, 200,000 were Don Cossacks, while the rest were from other hosts. There were also some infantry battalions (plastun) from the Kuban Cossacks. All Cossacks were trained to fight both on horseback and on foot. Cavalry charges were used early in the war but became rare by the end of 1915. They were used to raid enemy positions and lines of communication, and also increasingly for duties behind the front line in rounding up deserters. During the Great Retreat in 1915 the Cossacks performed a scorched earth campaign in Polish and Ukrainian lands that were being abandoned and enforced the mandatory evacuation of hundreds of thousands of local peasants further east. In October 1916 Cossack regiments were used to put down a strike at a factory in Petrograd after regular soldiers refused. Additional Cossack units from the Northern Front were deployed to the capital after the incident. But during the February Revolution some Cossacks joined with the protestors.

During the October Revolution, two Don Cossack regiments led by Alexander Kerensky and Pyotr Krasnov tried to stop the Bolshevik takeover in Petrograd, but were defeated.

=== Muslims ===
The Muslim subjects of the Russian Empire were exempted from the military draft and were recruited on a voluntary basis into certain units. As of 1913 these were the Dagestan cavalry regiment and the Turkoman cavalry division. Before the start of World War I it was estimated there were about 400 Muslim officers in the Russian army, including 30 generals.

The Cossack institution recruited and incorporated Muslim Mishar Tatars. Cossack rank was awarded to Bashkirs. Muslim Turkics and Buddhist Kalmyks served as Cossacks. The Cossack Ural, Terek, Astrakhan, and Don Cossack hosts had Kalmyks in their ranks. Mishar Muslims, Teptiar Muslims, service Tatar Muslims, and Bashkir Muslims joined the Orenburg Cossack Host. Cossack non-Muslims shared the same status with Cossack Siberian Muslims. Muslim Cossacks in Siberia requested an Imam. Cossacks in Siberia included Tatar Muslims like in Bashkiria.

Bashkirs and Kalmyks in the Russian military fought against Napoleon's forces. They were judged suitable for inundating opponents but not for intense fighting. They were in a non standard capacity in the military. Arrows, bows, and melee combat weapons were wielded by the Muslim Bashkirs. Bashkir women fought among the regiments. Denis Davidov mentioned the arrows and bows wielded by the Bashkirs. Napoleon's forces faced off against Kalmyks on horseback. Napoleon faced light mounted Bashkir forces. Mounted Kalmyks and Bashkirs numbering 100 were available to Russian commandants during the war against Napoleon. Kalmyks and Bashkirs served in the Russian Army in France. A nachalnik was present in every one of the 11 cantons of the Bashkir host which was created by Russia after the Pugachev's Rebellion. Bashkirs had the military statute of 1874 applied to them.

From 1914 to 1917 the Caucasian Native Cavalry Division (later the Caucasian Native Cavalry Corps; often called the "Savage Division"), grouped together mainly Muslim volunteers from the Caucasus region.

=== Jews ===
On 26 August 1827, Nicholas I of Russia declared the "Statute on Conscription Duty". This statute made it mandatory that all Russian males ages twelve to twenty-five were now required to serve in the Russian armed forces for 25 years. This was the first time that the massive Jewish population was required to serve in the Russian military. The reasoning for Nicolas for mandatory conscription was because "in the military they would learn not only Russian but also useful skills and crafts, and eventually they would become his loyal subjects."

Many Jewish families began to emigrate out of the Russian Empire in order to escape the conscription obligations. Due to this, the government began to employ khappers who would kidnap Jewish children and turn them over to the government for conscription. It became known that "the khappers were not scrupulous about adhering to the minimum age of 12 and frequently impressed children as young as 8." "By the time the empire collapsed, around 1.5 million Jewish soldiers fulfilled what was often seen as a highly burdensome and intrusive obligation." At first many Jews were hesitant, but by 1880 Russian Jews were fully integrated into the Russian military. During and after the post-Crimean War reforms there was an effort to improve the treatment of Jews in the army, such as to assimilate them to become like other Russian soldiers and to even convert them to Orthodox Christianity. These policies were somewhat reversed during the reign of Emperor Alexander III.

Jews usually staffed no more than six percent of a Russian regiment.

=== Latvians ===
Starting on 16 August 1915 the Russian Stavka began forming Latvian Riflemen battalions in the Imperial Army. Initially there were eight battalions, each named after a city or region in Latvia. On 3 November 1916 the Latvian battalions were expanded into regiments, organized into the 1st and 2nd Latvian Rifle Brigades, with four regiments each. They notable took part in the Christmas Battles in late 1916 alongside other units of the Russian army and achieved a victory against German troops. After the Russian Revolution, the majority of them joined the Bolsheviks and became the Red Latvian Riflemen, while a smaller number, mostly officers or 1st Regiment soldiers, joined the White Russian movement.

== Titles, ranks, and insignia until 1917 ==
See for a more detailed history, ranks, and insignia

In 1913 the army received a universal field grey (green-grey) service uniform for all regiments. The Imperial Guard, cavalry, Cossack, and horse artillery units continued to maintain a separate dress uniform in addition to the field uniform. Kuban and Terek Cossacks wore a type of coat called cherkesska instead of the field service uniform blouse, though it was a similar color to the field service uniform.

The main ways to distinguish between individual units and arms of service based on the shoulder strap were the color of the piping and buttons in the case of Imperial Guard units and the distinguishing marks of all other units. The distinguishing marks could include one or a combination of the following: the number of the regiment (or the number of the corps, division, or brigade for each of their staff officers), sometimes with letters that the indicated the region or the branch of service; the monogram or the initials of the titles of the monarch or other royalty that were the honorary colonel-in-chief of the regiment; a symbol for artillery or technical units, or small letters for medical, transportation, and other support units. The colors of the shoulder strap on the service uniform greatcoat were different colors, and these varied depending on the sub-type of infantry or cavalry, or the Cossack host, though artillery and engineers had scarlet shoulder straps and support units had blue. The same colors were used on the reverse side of the shoulder straps of the field service uniform blouse.

The form of address for generals was "Your High Excellency", for lieutenant and major generals "Your Excellency", for field grade officers "Your High Honor", for other officers "Your Honor", and for NCOs it was "Mister" (gospodin) followed by their rank.

Table of military ranks. The shoulder board colors are the Guards infantry regiments' dress and the generic field-grey of all other regiments.
Infantry and engineer	Artillery	Cavalry	Cossack	Shoulder strap	
Infantry and engineer	Artillery	Cavalry	Cossack	Dress uniform	Field uniform
Nizhniye chiny (Enlisted ranks)
Ryadovoi; Private	Kanonir; Cannoneer	Ryadavoi, gusar, dragun, ulan, kirasir Private, Hussar, Dragoon, Uhlan, Cuirassier	Kazak; Cossack		
Yefreitor (Gefreiter); Corporal	Bombardir; Bombardier	Yefreitor; Corporal	Prikazny; Cossack corporal		
Unter-ofitsery (Non-commissioned officers)
Mladshy unter-ofitser (Unteroffizier); Junior sergeant	Mladshy feierverker (Feuerwerker); Artillery junior sergeant	Mladshy unter-ofitser Junior sergeant	Mladshy uryadnik Cossack junior sergeant		
Starshy unter-ofitser Senior sergeant	Starshy feierverker Artillery senior sergeant	Starshy unter-ofitser Senior sergeant	Starshy uryadnik Cossack senior sergeant		
Feldfebel (Feldwebel); Sergeant major		Vakhmistr (Wachtmeister); Cavalry sergeant major			
Podpraporshchik; Junior ensign			Podkhorunzhy; Cossack junior ensign		
Zauryad-praporshchik; Deputy ensign		Podpraporshchik na ofitserskoi dolzhnosti Junior ensign in the role of officer	Zauryad-praporshchik; Cossack deputy ensign		
Ober-ofitsery (Company officers)
Praporshchik (Note: Reserve only.); Ensign					
Podporuchik; Junior lieutenant		Kornet; Cavalry junior lieutenant	Khorunzhy; Cossack senior ensign		
Poruchik; Lieutenant			Sotnik; Cossack lieutenant		
Shtabs-kapitan (Stabskapitän); Staff captain		Shtabs-rotmistr; Cavalry staff captain	Podyesaul; Cossack staff captain		
Kapitan (Kapitän) (Note: Field officer rank from 1884.); Captain		Rotmistr (Rittmeister); Cavalry captain	Yesaul; Cossack captain		
Shtab-Ofitsery (Field officers)
Maior (Note: Abolished in 1884.); Major			Voiskovoi starshina Cossack major		—N/a
Podpolkovnik; Lieutenant colonel			Podpolkovnik (Note: Abolished in 1884 and replaced.); Lieutenant colonel		
Podpolkovnik; Lieutenant colonel			Voiskovoi starshina Cossack lieutenant colonel		
Polkovnik; Colonel					
General officers
General-maior (Generalmajor); Major general					
General-leitenant (Generalleutnant); Lieutenant general					
General ot infanterii (General of the infantry)	General ot artillerii (General of the artillery)	General ot kavalerii (General of the cavalry)			
General-feldmarshal (Generalfeldmarschall); General field marshal					—N/a

== See also ==
- Imperial Russian Air Service
- Imperial Russian Navy
- Military history of the Russian Empire
- Ranks and rank insignia of the Russian armed forces until 1917
- Separate Corps of Gendarmes
- Signal Corps of the Imperial Russian Army
- Svita
- Mikhail Krichevsky, Ukrainian supercentenarian and last living veteran of the Imperial Russian Army

== Sources ==
- Anderson, M. S. (1995) [1978]. Peter the Great. New York: Routledge. ISBN 978-0-582-43746-3.
- Blum, Jerome (1971). Lord and Peasant in Russia from the Ninth to the Nineteenth Century. Princeton University Press. ISBN 0-691-00764-0.
- Brooks, E. Willis (1984). "Reform in the Russian Army, 1856-1861". Slavic Review. 43 (1): 63–82. doi:10.2307/2498735. JSTOR 2498735.
- Beevor, Antony (2022). Russia: Revolution and Civil War, 1917–1921. Penguin. ISBN 978-0-593-49388-5.
- Chandler, David G., The Campaigns of Napoleon, Simon & Schuster, New York, 1995 ISBN 0-02-523660-1
- Fisher, Toddm Fremont-Barnes, Gregory, The Napoleonic Wars: The Rise and Fall of an Empire, Osprey Publishing Ltd., Oxford, 2004 ISBN 1-84176-831-6
- General Staff, War Office (1996) [1st pub. 1914]. Handbook of the Russian Army. London: Imperial War Museum. ISBN 0-89839-250-0.
- Harrison, Richard W. The Russian Way of War: Operational Art, 1904–1940 (University Press of Kansas, 2001)
- Massie, Robert K. (2011) [1980]. Peter the Great: His Life and World. New York: Random House. ISBN 978-0-307-81723-5.
- Mayzel, Matitiahu (1975). "The Formation of the Russian General Staff. 1880-1917. A Social Study". Cahiers du Monde Russe et Soviétique. 16 (3/4): 297–321. doi:10.3406/cmr.1975.1241. JSTOR 20169731.
- Menning, Bruce W. Bayonets before Bullets: The Russian Imperial Army, 1861–1914. (Indiana U.P. 1992).
- Mueggenberg, Brent (2019). The Cossack Struggle Against Communism, 1917-1945. Jefferson: McFarland. ISBN 978-1-4766-7948-8.
- Reese, Roger R. (2019). The Imperial Russian Army in Peace, War, and Revolution, 1856-1917. Lawrence: University Press of Kansas. ISBN 978-0-7006-2860-5.
- Smirnov, Alexander A. (2002). Казачьи атаманы [Cossack Atamans] (in Russian). Saint Petersburg: Neva. ISBN 5-7654-2220-9.
- Stepanov, Valery L. (2022). "Financiers and Generals: Debates about Military Spending in the Ruling Circles of the Russian Empire (1860s–Early 1890s)". Herald of the Russian Academy of Sciences. 92 (8): S713–S728. Bibcode:2022HRuAS..92S.713S. doi:10.1134/S101933162214009X.
- Stone, David R. (2015). The Russian Army in the Great War: The Eastern Front, 1914–1917. Lawrence: University Press of Kansas. ISBN 978-0-7006-3308-1.
- Summerfield, Stephen (2005) Cossack Hurrah: Russian Irregular Cavalry Organisation and Uniforms during the Napoleonic Wars, Partizan Press ISBN 1-85818-513-0
- Summerfield, Stephen (2007) The Brazen Cross: Brazen Cross of Courage: Russian Opochenie, Partizans and Russo-German Legion during the Napoleonic Wars, Partizan Press ISBN 978-1-85818-555-2
- Deyo, Daniel C. Legions of the East: A Compendium of the Russian Army in the First World War (Counterintelligence Consulting LLC, 2016)
- Ziemke, Earl F. (2004). The Red Army, 1918-1941: From Vanguard of World Revolution to America's Ally. Taylor & Francis. ISBN 978-1-135-76918-5.
- Wildman, Allen K. (1980). The End of the Russian Imperial Army: The Old Army and the Soldiers' Revolt (March-April 1917). Vol. I. Princeton University Press. ISBN 978-1-4008-4771-6.
