= Stanisław Kosmowski =

- Born: c. 1752; Poland
- Died: c. 1821

Stanisław Kosmowski of Trąby (late 18th century, some sources cite 1752–1821) was a Polish military officer and author.

In October 1776 he joined the Horse Guard of the Polish Crown Regiment as a cadet. On 1 December 1789 he was promoted to the rank of staff captain and in 1792 he was promoted to captain. A member of Tadeusz Kościuszko's conspiracy, he took part in the Warsaw Uprising of 1794 as one of the leaders of the Polish forces, possibly as the commanding officer of his regiment. Following the Polish victory he was one of the signatories of the act of accession of the city of Warsaw to Kościuszko's Uprising and soon afterwards became one of the members of War Council of the land of Mazovia.

Promoted to the rank of major on 18 May 1794, in July he joined the Corps of General Karol Sierakowski and distinguished himself in the battles of Krupczyce and Terespol. For his bravery on the field of battle he was awarded with the Ojczyzna Obrońcy Swemu ring (number 38), the replacement for the Virtuti Militari medal abolished soon before. Wounded during the disastrous Battle of Maciejowice, he nevertheless managed to lead his forces out of the Russian encirclement and reach Warsaw, where king Stanisław August Poniatowski promoted him to the rank of Colonel.

In 1796 he joined General Ksawery Dąbrowski in Bucharest, hoping to gather forces and start another uprising against Austria and Russia. He served as Dąbrowski's envoy to the French ambassador to Constantinople, and to Osman Pazvantoğlu, the leader of rebels against the Ottoman Empire. His missions however failed to gather support for the Polish cause and eventually, after the death of Catherine II of Russia, he followed Dąbrowski to St. Petersburg, where the two were pardoned and joined Russian military service. His further fate remains unknown.

He is best known as the author of memoirs, published initially in 1807 as Historia polska czyli Rys panowania Stanisława Augusta króla polskiego (Polish History, that is an outline of the rule of Stanisław August, the king of Poland). The book, republished in 1860 and again in 1870 under a new title of Pamiętniki Stanisława Kosmowskiego z końca XVIII wieku (Memoirs of Stanisław Kosmowski from the end of the 18th century), is an important source on late 18th century history of Poland and the Polish–Lithuanian Commonwealth.
