= Battle of Brest (1794) =

Battle of the Kościuszko Uprising

- Part of the Kościuszko Uprising
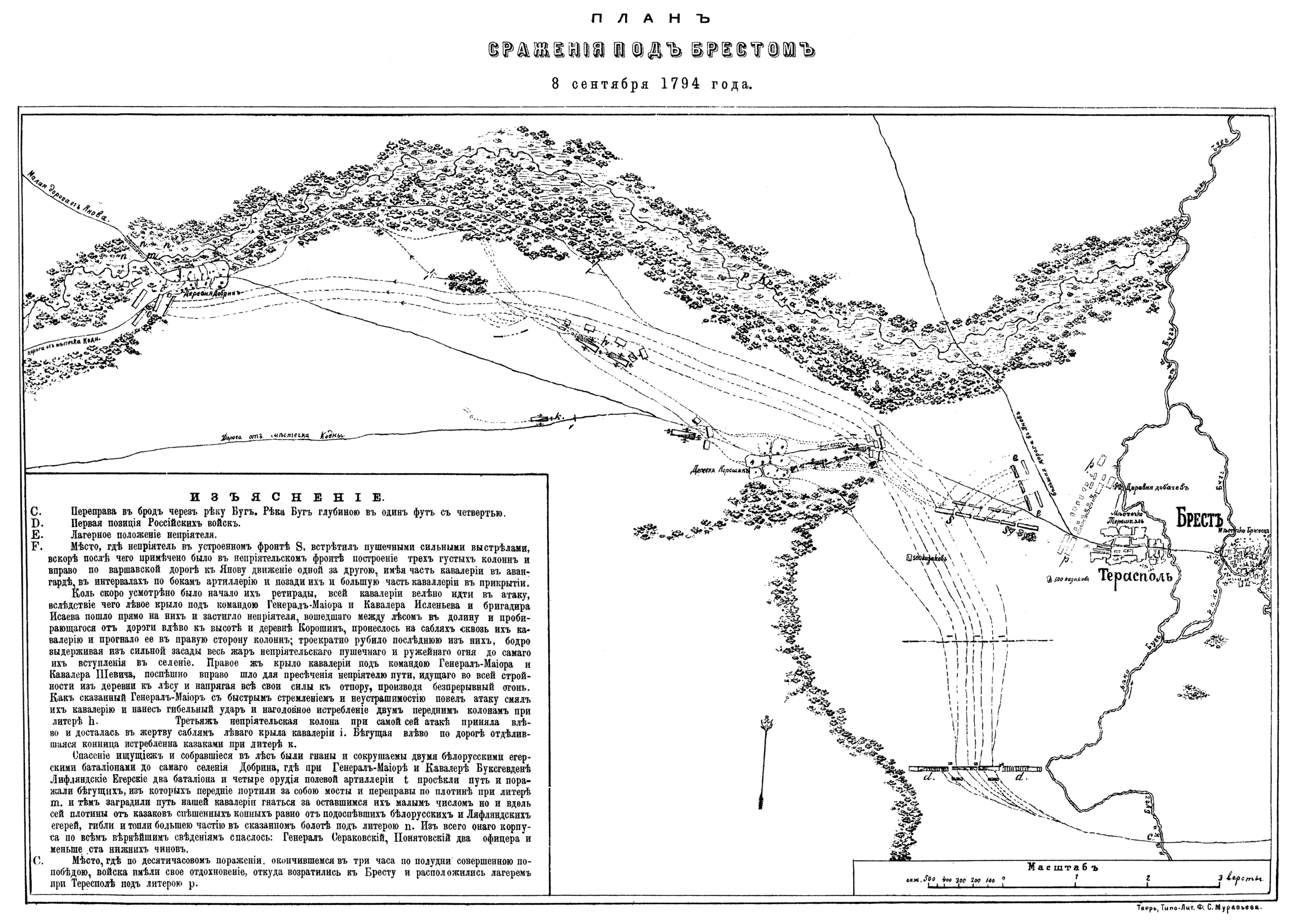
- Schematic of the Battle of Brest; The history of the cavalry by M. Markov
Date	19 September 1794 (8th O.S.)
Location	Brest, Województwo brzeskie, Grand Duchy of Lithuania, present-day Belarus
Result	Russian victory

Belligerents
Russian Empire	Poland–Lithuania

Commanders and leaders
Alexander Suvorov; Pyotr Islenyev; Georgy Shevich; Yakov Kulnev	Karol Sierakowski; Stanisław Mokronowski; Stanisław Kosmowski

Strength
8,000–9,000 (Note: 8,000; per Bodart: 4,300 infantry, 3,700 Reiters; 9,000; n.b.: 12–13,000 in total) 14 cannons	16,000–17,000: (Note: per POWs: 16,500 regulars/scythemen): 6,000–7,000 regulars; (Note: 6,000 regulars; 6–7,000 (per Tomasz Wawrzecki)); 10,000 scythemen. (Note: Sierakowski's entire force could have totalled circa 13,000 men (28 cannons; or 12,000 as per Bodart, including 8,000 infantry and 4,000 Reiters). As per other sources, by 14 September he had only 4,917 men (26 cannon). Polish sources indicate 5,500 men (26 cannon) plus 1,074 (5 cannon), apparently Kniaziewicz's soldiers sent to him. The latter figures likely do not include the militia, massively armed only with scythes. Based on the statement that Sierakowski's troops consisted of 2/3 of scythes, his army consisted of about 15,000 men, according to one claim. Among the militia there were about 2,000 scythemen from Brest, Kobryn, Pruzhany, Bereza and Slonim. A significant part of the militia must have been left behind in the camp near Terespol.); 28 cannons

Casualties and losses
Up to 1,000 killed or wounded	2,145 killed or wounded (Note: The source denote the number of 2,645 killed, wounded and captured. If reconcile it with the data of Sytin Military Encyclopedia about 500 prisoners below, then get the corresponding number.); 500 captured (Note: or up to 4,000 casualties) All artillery pieces 2 standards

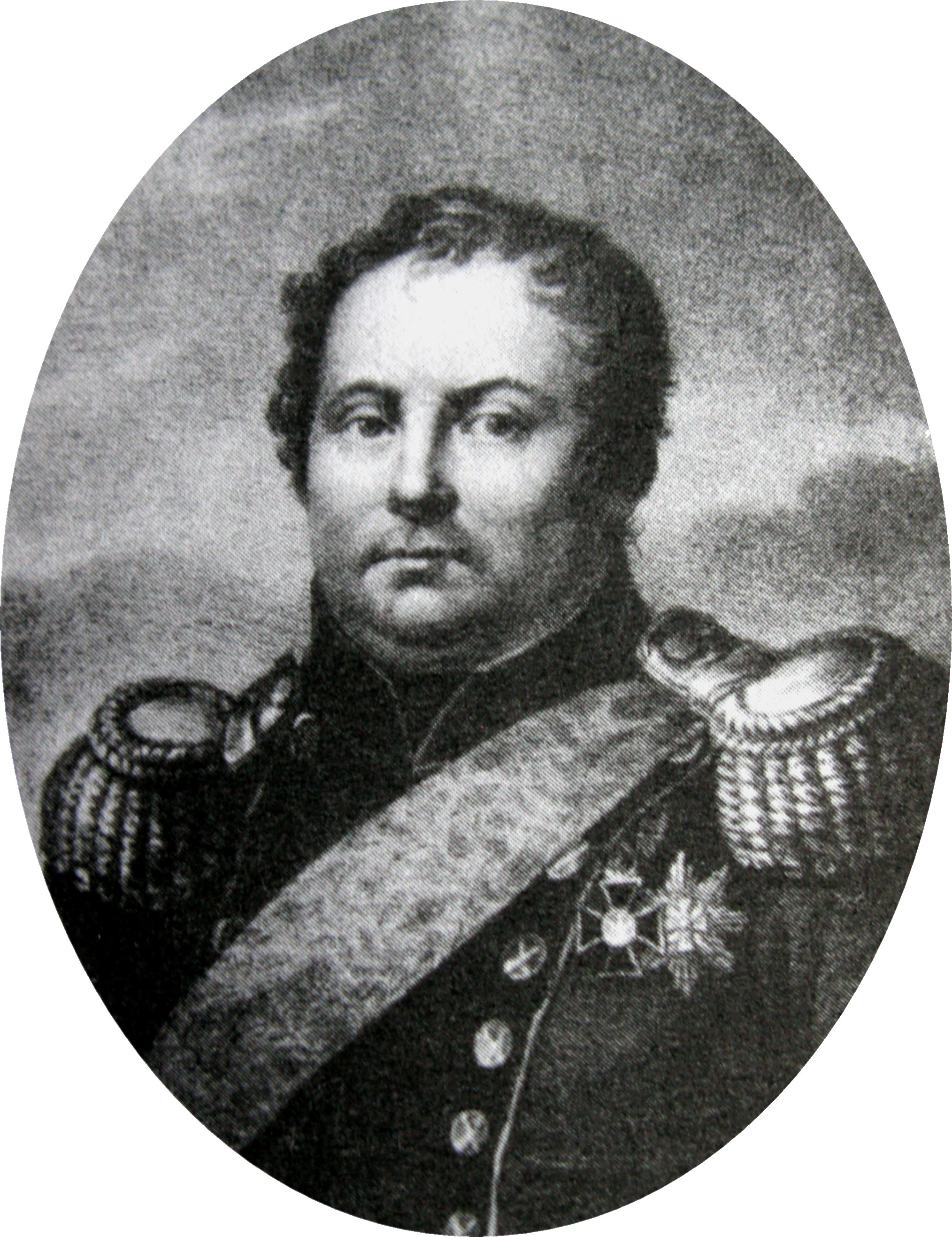
Karol Sierakowski, the Polish commander

The Battle of Brest (Brześć in Polish), also known as the Battle of Terespol, took place between Russian imperial forces and Polish-Lithuanian insurrectionists south-west of Brest (near the village of Terespol), present-day Belarus, on 19 September 1794; the Russians won the encounter. It was part of the Kościuszko Uprising.

== Preparations ==
The Russian forces were commanded by General-in-Chief Alexander Suvorov, who a little earlier, taking advantage of Sierakowski's inferior numbers, had defeated his men in the Battle of Krupczyce. Suvorov met Sierakowski again on the battlefield.

Before 19 September, Polish-Lithuanian insurrectionists fortified themselves in the marshes near the town of Brest. At night (at 2 AM, according to one source), Alexander Suvorov moved his troops near the Polish-Lithuanian positions, having forded the Western Bug river, and attacked at dawn. Polish forces consisted of Sierakowski's force with a detachment of Mokronowski from Lithuania for a total of 6,000 regulars and 10,000 scythemen, with 28 guns.

== Battle ==
For the Russians, the assault was successful, the Poles could not hold out and began to retreat in three columns, pursued by cavalry (Islenyev on the left and Shevich on the right). A Polish attempt to hold their ground near the village of Koroshino failed, and they continued to retreat with heavy losses.

The fighting lasted for six hours, often involving hand-to-hand combat with cold arms of infantry, but the Russians finally managed to gain the upper hand, destroying the Polish force. 500 of Sierakowski's men were taken prisoner, and the fields all around Brest were covered with corpses. The Polish lost all of their 28 artillery pieces and two banners. It was a complete destruction of Sierakowski's forces: only 1,000 men escaped.

According to Russian sources, Sierakowski himself fled to Siedlce with a detachment of his cavalry corps. A Russian military report stated that losses on their side stood at 95 killed and 228 injured, however in reality it is estimated that around 1000 Russians were killed.

== Aftermath ==
The Russian victory at Brest took a major hit on Polish morale. Tadeusz Kościuszko himself was distraught by the loss. In August, he announced at a meeting that by September, the Ottoman Empire would declare war on Russia and that "Suvorov, occupied by [them], could not be in Poland." Subsequently, there were rumors that a relatively low-ranking Cossack general named Suvorov, as opposed to the well-known one, was going to lead the Russian fight in Poland. After the Battle of Brest, however, it became clear which Suvorov was on the front lines. The next battle for him would be the Battle of Kobyłka.

=== Kościuszko's response ===
Kościuszko rushed to Siedlce to rally his troops and prevent the spread of panic. He explained the defeat at Brest as not the fault of the Polish commanders, but rather that the Russians simply had a numerical superiority. He also presented several of his commanders with new awards, with golden rings inscribed with the slogan, "The fatherland to its defender". Despite Kościuszko's efforts, Polish morale still suffered. This is evidenced by a report presented by Kościuszko, to the commanders of the Lithuanian army in Grodno:

"I warn the whole military; if anyone disturbs him with talk about how as if it is impossible to hold out against the Muscovites, or starts shouting during the time of battle that the Muscovites are on our rear, that they are cutting us off, or the like, he will be immediately locked in cuffs, turned over to a court and, by show of guilt, shot. I order to general Makranowski that during battle, part of the infantry with artillery will always stand behind the line with cannon charged with grapeshot, which will shoot those who flee. May everyone know that by advancing, they will gain victory and glory, but by turning back, will meet shame and imminent death. If among those who serve there are those who are convinced that the Muscovites cannot be defeated, people who are indifferent to their fatherland, freedom and glory, may they announce in advance their resignation from duty. It hurts me that I must institute such harsh rules. "

Kościuszko found it necessary to remind his subordinates of their historical legacy:

"Some tens of your ancestors could have conquered the entire Muscovite state, brought their czars in shackles, appointed the Muscovites a lord - but you, descendants of those very Polacks [sic], may doubt the successes of a fight for the fatherland, freedom, and your houses, for blood-relatives and for friends, and consider undefeatable those predatory gangs, who take the upper hand on you only because of your cowardice. "

=== Reaction in Russia ===
In Saint Petersburg, Suvorov's victory was very well received. Catherine the Great granted him an expensive diamond hat bow and three cannon captured from the Poles; Pyotr Rumyantsev thanked Suvorov and presented a most flattering evaluation of his efforts.
