= Battle of Krupczyce =

Battle of the Kościuszko Uprising

- Part of the Kościuszko Uprising
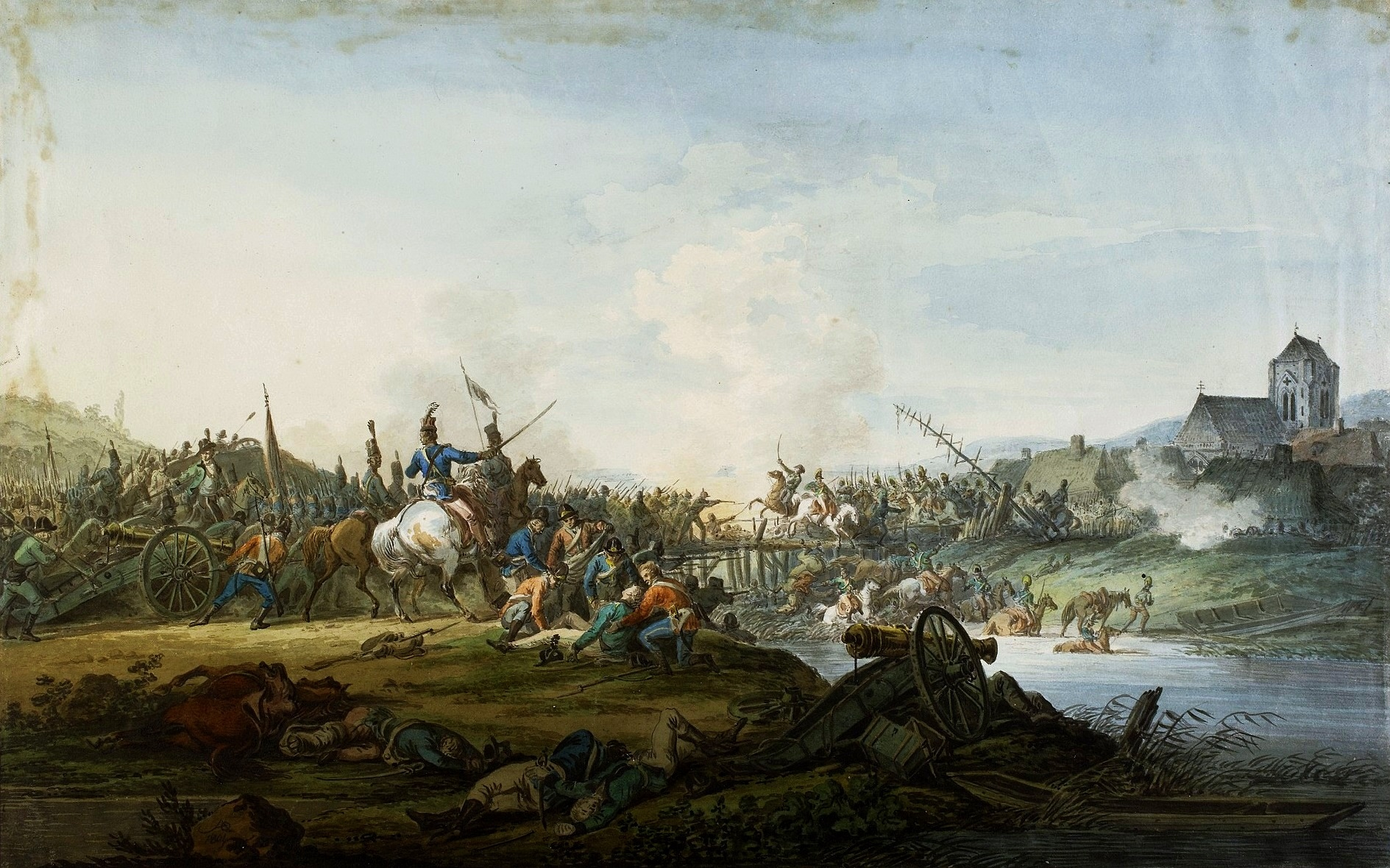
- Fighting for a river crossing. Russian units on the right side and Polish on the left. If the artist indeed depicted the Battle of Krupczyce, Krupczyce is not what is visible behind the Russians. Artist: Aleksander Orłowski
Date	17 September 1794 (6th O.S.)
Location	Krupczyce, Brest Litovsk Voivodeship, Grand Duchy of Lithuania (today part of Chyzhewshchyna, Belarus)
Result	Russian victory

Belligerents
(Russian Empire) Russia	Poland–Lithuania

Commanders and leaders
Alexander Suvorov; Fyodor Buksgevden; Ivan Isaev; Georgy Shevich; Pyotr Islenyev	Karol Sierakowski; Stanisław Kosmowski

Strength
12,000 men, 39 cannons	4,000 men, 26 cannons

Casualties and losses
325–700	~3,000 killed, wounded, or captured (Note: "The Poles lost many killed; most of Suvorov's historiographers put their figure at 3,000 men. It is probably exaggerated, but in any case it must be high, since the battle was characterised by great persistence, and the Russian infantry almost constantly acted with bayonets. In his report Suvorov says that the Poles lost 3,000 men killed, wounded and prisoners; this is closer to the truth.") (Suvorov's report): 300 killed (Polish source)

The Battle of Krupczyce took place between the Russian Empire's armed forces under the command of Alexander Vasilyevich Suvorov and Kościuszko's Polish-Lithuanian rebels under Karol Józef Sierakowski east of Brest (near the Krupczyce Abbey), in present-day Chyzhewshchyna, Belarus, on September 17, 1794. It was part of the Kościuszko Uprising and ended with the defeat of the rebels.

== Encounter ==
Sierakowski held a strong position behind the swamp, protected by artillery batteries; the abbey was a rear stronghold, which proved to be the last Polish defensive position during the battle, and there were also small wooded high ground on both Polish flanks. Based on a Polish POW's claim (a soldier from a cavalry patrol), Suvorov stated Sierakowski's strength to be over 16,000 men plus 28 cannon; if so, he could not bypass the position, as he would have been numerically inferior in this case (this is the view held by the 19th- and 20th-century historian Petrushevsky). Sierakowski probably had only 4,000 men and 26 cannon at the Krupczyce position.

Suvorov eventually put heavy pressure on Sierakowski from the front but closer to the left Polish flank. The infantry lines of both opponents intersected, the Russian grenadiers were assisted by a 14-gun battery deployed by Suvorov on a high ground, and Sierakowski was forced to gradually retreat in good order, despite initially worthy resistance. Then the Russian cavalry units, arriving in time, flanked Sierakowski. On the right Polish flank, they found a half-destroyed bridge and crossed it; on the left Polish flank, with great difficulty, they dismounted, leading their horses by the reins and covering the swamp with tree branches and CWD. Despite the cavalry's appearance, the Poles continued their retreat slowly and in battle orders, supported by the fire of their numerous artillery, to which the Russians could only counter with 4 regimental guns at the time. The Poles' cavalry attack on the Russian rear failed. As dusk fell, the Poles took refuge in the twilight forest, where the Russians could no longer pursue them.

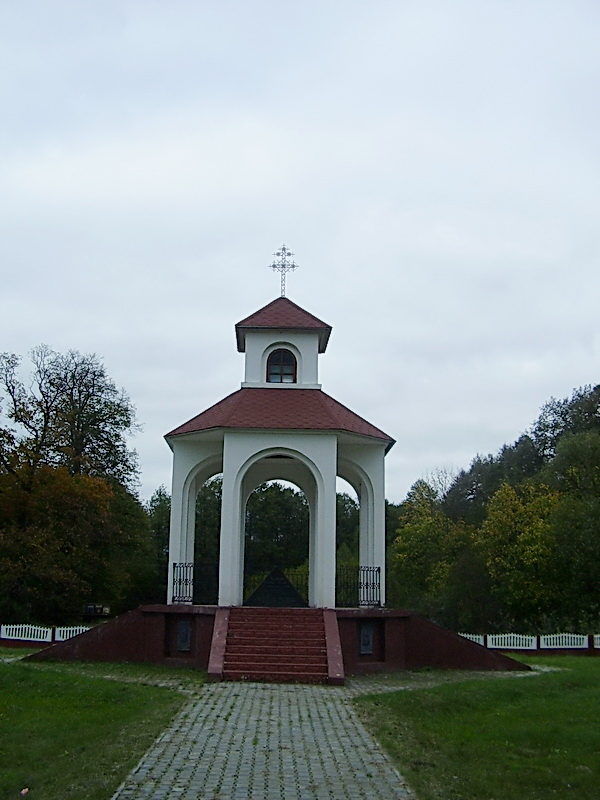
Chapel in Chyzhewshchyna in memory of those killed in the battle

== Sources ==
- Petrushevsky, Alexander (1884). "Польская война: Крупчицы, Брест; 1794" [Polish war: Krupczyce, Brest; 1794]. Generalissimo Prince Suvorov (in Russian). Vol. 2 (1st ed.). St. Petersburg: Типография М. М. Стасюлевича. pp. 49, 56–59.
- Herbst, Stanisław (1983). Z dziejów wojskowych powstania kościuszkowskiego 1794 roku. Warsaw. pp. 359–372.
