= List of museums in Saint Petersburg =

This is a list of museums in Saint Petersburg, Russia.

== Biographical museums ==
=== Writers ===
==== Anna Akhmatova museums ====
- Anna Akhmatova Literary and Memorial Museum (Fountain House)
- Anna Akhmatova. The Silver Age (in Avtovo)

==== Alexander Pushkin museums ====
- National Pushkin Museum - of Alexander Pushkin, with branches:
  - Derzhavin Museum - of Gavrila Derzhavin
  - Nekrasov Apartment Museum - of Nikolay Nekrasov, with Ivan Panaev memorial study
- The Tsarskoye Selo Lyceum Museum

==== Other writers ====
- Derzhavin Museum - of Gavrila Derzhavin
- Dostoevsky Museum
- Joseph Brodsky - two locations: branch of Anna Akhmatova (Fountain House) Museum and Brodsky's apartment in St. Petersburg
- Mikhail Zoshchenko's apartment
- Nabokov House

==== Literary characters ====
- Ostap Bender

=== Artists ===
- Arkhip Kuindzhi - a branch of Russian Academy of Arts Research Museum
- Ilya Repin (The Penates House) - a branch of Russian Academy of Arts Research Museum
- Isaak Brodsky - a branch of Russian Academy of Arts Research Museum

=== Scientists/scholars ===
- Dmitry Mendeleev's Memorial Museum Apartment
- Ivan Pavlov's memorial apartment - in Academician's Home (Rus. Dom Akademikov) at 1, Lieutenant Schmidt Embankment
- Lev Gumilev - branch of Anna Akhmatova (Fountain House) Museum
- Mikhail Lomonosov museum - a department of Peter the Great Museum of Anthropology and Ethnography in the building of Kunstkamera

=== Musicians ===
==== Classical ====
- Feodor Chaliapin Apartment and Museum - a branch of the St.Petersburg State Museum of Theatre and Music
- Rimsky-Korsakov Apartment and Museum - a branch of the St.Petersburg State Museum of Theatre and Music

==== Rock ====
- John Lennon Love, Peace and Music Temple - at 10, Pushkinskaya street squat
- Kamchatka - of Viktor Tsoi

=== Actors ===
- The Samoilov Actors' Family Museum - a branch of the St.Petersburg State Museum of Theatre and Music

=== Politicians, statesmen's and military leaders' ===
- The State Museum of the Political History of Russia - with several branches

==== Pre-1917 ====
- Admiral Stepan Makarov's Memorial Study - at Gidropribor production facility in Saint Petersburg
- Cabin of Peter the Great
- Plekhanov House
- Stroganov Palace
- Suvorov Museum
- Winter Palace of Peter the Great
- Yusupov Palace on the Moika (Moika Palace)

==== Soviet politicians ====
===== Lenin museums =====
- Raznochinniy Petersburg (The St. Petersburg of Raznochintsy)
- The State Historical and Memorial Museum of Smolny - in the building occupied since the 1920s by the city government; previously of the former Smolny Institute next to Smolny Convent. In early 21st century it shows 1) the history of the pre-1917 institute (the first state educational facility for young ladies), 2) the history of 1917 October Revolution and the time the building was occupied until the spring of 1918 by the first Soviet Government led by Vladimir Lenin which later moved to Moscow, including Lenin's apartment/study, 3) later Soviet period. The museum has branches, partly left after the closing in early 1990s of the city's branched subsidiary of National Lenin Museum:
  - the Yelizarov family memorial apartment near ulitsa Lenina (Lenin Street) in Petrogradsky district (one of Lenin's sisters Anna née Uliyanova was married to Mark Yelizarov, and Lenin was their guest);
  - the Alliluyev family memorial apartment in 10th Sovietskaya ulitsa. (The family of Nadezhda Alliluyeva and her parents was frequented by Joseph Stalin after his Siberian exile).

===== Kirov museum =====
- Sergei Kirov Memorial Apartment Museum

==== Post-1988 public figures ====
- Anatoly Sobchak Museum of the Foundation of Democracy in Modern Russia

== Fine arts museums and galleries ==
- Russian Museum
  - Benois Wing
  - Marble Palace
  - Mikhailovsky Castle
  - Mikhailovsky Palace
  - Stroganov Palace
- Fabergé Museum
- Erarta Museum and Galleries of Contemporary Art
- Museum of St. Petersburg Art, St. Petersburg, Russia
- Russian Academy of Arts Research Museum
- The State Hermitage Museum
  - General Staff Building's East Wing (pre-1917 ministerial quarters)
  - Hermitage Theatre
  - Menshikov Palace
  - Military Gallery
  - Museum of Porcelain (Museum of the Imperial Porcelain Factory)
  - New Hermitage
  - Old Hermitage
  - Storage Facility of the State Hermitage
  - Winter Palace of Peter the Great
- Stieglitz Museum of Applied Arts

== Local history museums ==
- Narva Triumphal Gate
- Peter and Paul Fortress – home of The State Museum of the History of St. Peterburg
- State Museum of the History of St. Petersburg

== Science and natural history museums ==
- Arctic and Antarctic Museum
- Kunstkamera – originally, Chamber of Curiosities; officially, Peter the Great Museum of Anthropology and Ethnography
- The Museum of Hygiene at the St. Petersburg City Center of Preventive Medicine at Count Shuvalov Palace
- Museum of Military Medicine
- Museum of Optical Technologies
- Pulkovo Observatory – officially, the Main (Pulkovo) Astronomical Observatory of Russian Academy of Sciences
- The Universe of Water
- Saint Petersburg Botanical Garden of Komarov Botanical Institute
- Zoological Collection of the Russian Academy of Science

== Transport museums ==
=== Automobiles and motorcycles ===
- Horsepower Museum of vintage automobiles and motorcycles

=== Aviation museums ===
- Civil Aviation Museum of Civil Aviation Academy

=== Rail museums ===
- Central Museum of Railway Transport
- Museum of Electrical Transport - at otherwise nearly disused Vasileostrovsky tram depot
- Russian Railway Museum - at disused Varshavsky Rail Terminal

=== Maritime museums ===
- Aleksandr Marinesko Museum of Russian Submarine Forces - at 83, Kondratiyeskiy prospekt
- С-189 diesel submarine, a Whiskey class submarine - moored off Lieutenant Shmidt Embankment, Vasilyevsky Island
- Central Naval Museum
  - D-2 Narodovolets Submarine — at 10 Shkipersky Protok, Vasilyevsky Island; launched 1994; branch of Central Naval Museum
- Krasin (1917 icebreaker)
- Museum of Submarine Armaments and Admiral Stepan Makarov's Memorial Study at Gidropribor production facility in Saint Petersburg
- Old Saint Petersburg Stock Exchange and Rostral Columns - former territory of the city's commercial port with lighthouses, goods storage houses, stock exchange (the latter until 2012 housing the Central Naval Museum)
- Russian battleship cruiser Aurora
- Shtandart, a replica of an 18th-century yacht of tsar Peter the Great

== Theatre, music and circus museums ==
- Alexandrinsky Theatre Endowment (Fund) Museum of Russian Drama (group visits only)
- "... and Muses never stopped" ("А музы не молчали") - a school museum dedicated to art and music in the besieged city during the World War II.
- Circus Art Museum - at the working first Saint Petersburg circus Ciniselli Circus
- Gramophone and Samovar Museums - of clown Vladimir (private)
- St. Petersburg State Museum of Theatre and Music, with its branches:
  - Feodor Chaliapin Apartment and Museum
  - The Museum of Music and Music Instruments at the Count Sheremetev Palace
  - Rimsky-Korsakov Apartment and Museum
  - The Samoilov Actors' Family Museum

== War and military museums ==
- First World War I museum - in Tsarskoe Selo; located in the recently restored Martial Chamber; features vehicles, military paraphernalia, documents, and even gas masks used for animals
- General Staff Building (now belongs to Hermitage Museum)
- Kazan Cathedral, St. Petersburg - now not a museum as such, but itself a monument to the victory in 1812 Napoleonic War, containing remains of the victorious Field Marshal Mikhail Kutuzov
- Military Gallery of the Winter Palace
- Museum of Military Medicine
- Narva Triumphal Gate
- Piskaryovskoye Memorial Cemetery - as well as St Seraphim of Sarov's Memorial Cemetery and a number of other memorial cemeteries
- Saint Michael's Castle
- Suvorov Museum
- Bathyscaphe Museum in Kronstadt

- Siege Medicine Museum

== Museum parks and gardens ==
- Gatchina
- Oranienbaum – now a branch of Peterhof museum
- Pavlovsk, Saint Petersburg
- Peterhof Palace – and many other museums and parks with fountains in Petergof
- Saint Petersburg Botanical Garden
- Summer Garden
- Tsarskoye Selo in Pushkin, Saint Petersburg

== Museums for children ==
- The Children's Center of Historical Education "Bolotnaya Street 13" - a branch of The State Museum of Political History
- Children's City Anichkov Palace Krestovskiy Island Bio-Eco Labs
- LabirintUm - a popular science museum for kids
- Leningrad Zoo
- Saint Petersburg Dolls Museum
- Saint Petersburg Toy Museum
- Umnikum - a popular science museum for kids
- The Universe of Water
- Tin Soldier Museum
- Shadow Museum
- Museum of Illusions
- Skateboarding Museum

== Philosophical museums ==
- Nicholas Roerich Museum-Institute
- Sigmund Freud Museum of Dreams

== Religious museums and museum places of worship ==
- State Museum of the History of Religion

=== Christian ===
==== Russian Orthodox ====
- Kazan Cathedral, now not a museum as such, but formerly housing Museum of Religion and Atheism (presently occupying a different building, the State Museum of the History of Religion); designed by Andrey Voronikhin, the cathedral resembles Vatican's St. Peter's Basilica and is a monument to Russia's victory in Napoleonic Wars of 1812-14
- Saint Isaac's Cathedral - designed by Auguste de Montferrand; museum and its other branches ("The Ring of Cathedrals"):
  - Church of the Savior on Blood - built to mark the place where the liberally reforming Tsar Alexander II of Russia was assassinated on March 1, 1881 by People's Will terrorists
  - Saint Sampson the Hospitable's Cathedral - a 1730s monument to Russia's victory in the decisive Battle of Poltava in the Great Northern War over the Swedish Empire;the church grounds became the city's first interdenominational cemetery where many of St Petersburg's famous international architects were laid to rest, as well as the executed conspirators of the Volynski Plot
  - Smolny Cathedral of Smolny Convent - features sky-blue Antonio Rastrelli's Baroque masterwork

== Former museums ==
- Kazan Cathedral – now not a museum, but formerly housing Museum of Religion and Atheism

== Food and drinks industry museums ==
- Beer Brewing Museum at Baltica Brewery
- Beer Brewing Museum at Stepan Razin Brewery - now a member of the Heineken group
- Bread Museum
- Russian Vodka Museum

== Private museums ==
- Horsepower Museum - vintage automobiles and motorcycles
- Gramophone and Samovar Museums - of clown Vladimir (private)
- Amber Museum of Alexander Krylov

== Suburban museums (royal country residences of palaces and parks) ==
- Gatchina
- Oranienbaum, now a branch of Peterhof museum
- Pavlovsk, Saint Petersburg
- Peterhof Palace, many other museums and parks with fountains in Petergof
- Tsarskoye Selo in Pushkin, Saint Petersburg

== See also ==
- List of buildings and structures in Saint Petersburg
- List of museums in Moscow
- List of museums in Russia
