= Plekhanov =

Plekhanov is the name of:

- Dmitri Plekhanov, called Kuretnikov (1642– around the turn of the century), Russian painter
- Georgi Plekhanov (1856–1918), Russian revolutionary and Marxist theoretician, namesake of library and university
- Vladimir Plekhanov (inventor) (born 1920), Russian firearms designer
- Gennadij Plekhanov (b. 1926), Russian scientist and namesake of the asteroid
- Sergei M. Plekhanov (born 1946), former Soviet Union government adviser, associate professor of Political Science at York University
- Vladimir G. Plekhanov computer scientist
- Vladimir Plekhanov (athlete) (born 1958), Russian triple jumper de:Wladimir Plechanow
- Dmitri Plekhanov (born 1978), Russian ice hockey player
- Andrei Plekhanov (born 1986), Russian ice hockey player

Plekhanov may also refer to:

- Plekhanov Russian Economic University, public university in Moscow
- Plekhanov House, collection of the Russian National Library in St Petersburg
- 14479 Plekhanov, main belt asteroid
