= List of museums in Moscow =

This is a list of museums in Moscow, the capital city of Russia

== List ==
Museums	Picture	Established	Reference
Bakhrushin Museum		1894	
Bulgakov Museum in Moscow		2007	
Cathedral of the Annunciation		1955	
Central Armed Forces Museum		1919	
Church of the Deposition of the Robe		1965	
Church of the Twelve Apostles		1918	
Cold War Museum (Moscow)		2006	
Diamond Fund		1967	
Fersman Mineralogical Museum		1716	
Galeyev Gallery		2006	
Gulag History Museum		2001–2026	
Ivan the Great Bell Tower		1991	
Jewish Museum and Tolerance Center		2012	
Kremlin Armoury		1806	
Kuskovo		1919	
Lumiere Brothers Center for Photography		2010	
The Lumiere Brothers Photogallery		2001	
Memorial Museum of Cosmonautics		1981	
Moscow Cat Museum		1993	
Moscow Design Museum		2012	
Moscow House of Photography		1996	
Moscow Museum of Modern Art		1999	
Multimedia Art Museum, Moscow		2010	
Museum of Calligraphy		2008	
Moscow Paleontological Museum		1937	
Museum of History of Moscow		1896	
Museum of the Great Patriotic War, Moscow		1995	
Museum of the Moscow Railway		2011	
Ostankino Palace		1919	
Poklonnaya Hill		1995	
Polytechnical Museum		1872	
Pushkin Museum		1912	
RKK Energiya museum		2008	
Shchusev State Museum of Architecture		1934	
State Historical Museum		1872	
Tagansky Protected Command Point		2006	
Tretyakov Gallery		1856	
Tsaritsyno Park		1984	
Vernadsky State Geological Museum		1755	
Vlakhernskoye-Kuzminki		1999	
Zoological Museum of Moscow University		1791	
New Tretyakov Gallery		1986	

== See also ==
- List of Moscow tourist attractions
- List of museums in Russia
- List of museums in Saint Petersburg
