= Suvorov Museum (disambiguation) =

Suvorov Museum is a military museum dedicated to Alexander Suvorov in St. Petersburg, Russia.

Suvorov Museum may also refer to:

- Suvorov Museum (Ochakiv), in Ochakiv, Ukraine
- Suvorov Museum, Izmail, Izmail, Ukraine
- Suvorov Museum, Timanivka, Ukraine
