= Log building =

Building constructed from wooden logs

Log buildings and structures can be categorized as historic and modern. They are placed in opposition to wooden structures built using frameworks, according to Eugene Viollet-le-Duc. A diverse selection of their forms and styles with examples of architectural elements is discussed in the following articles:

- Log cabin – a rustic dwelling
- Log house – a style and method of building a quality house
- Izba – a type of Russian peasant house, often of log construction. The Cabin of Peter the Great is based on an izba.
- Crib barn – a type of barn built using log cribs
- Some barns are log barns such as the earliest of the Pennsylvania barn types.
- Blockhouse, garrison house – some blockhouse or garrison house structures are tightly fitted timber or stacked plank construction buildings to help withstand an attack.
- Azekurazukuri – a Japanese style of building using triangular log construction
- Some granaries (raccard, stabbur, hórreo) are of log or plank construction.
- The Upper Lusatian house, also called Umgebinde in German, combines timber framing and log building
- Wooden churches in Ukraine – many of the churches are recognized world heritage sites.
- Corner post construction sometimes called post-and-plank – this construction method blurs the line between timber framing and log construction with a frame infilled with logs or planks to form the walls.
- Timber dam – timber crib dams are used to dam rivers.
- Zakopane Style architecture – inspired by the regional art of Poland's highland region known as Podhale uses log construction.
- Hogan – this Native American dwelling evolved to be built of logs.
- Chalet – Originally a dwelling-barn-house type farmhouse typically of timber construction (blockbau)
- Black Forest house – traditional farmhouse type of timber construction
- Octagonal churches in Norway are of log construction, some dating from the 17th century
- For Finnish and German language users see the special type of Finnish log church construction called Tukipilarikirkko or Stützpfeilerkirche
Examples of log buildings and structures
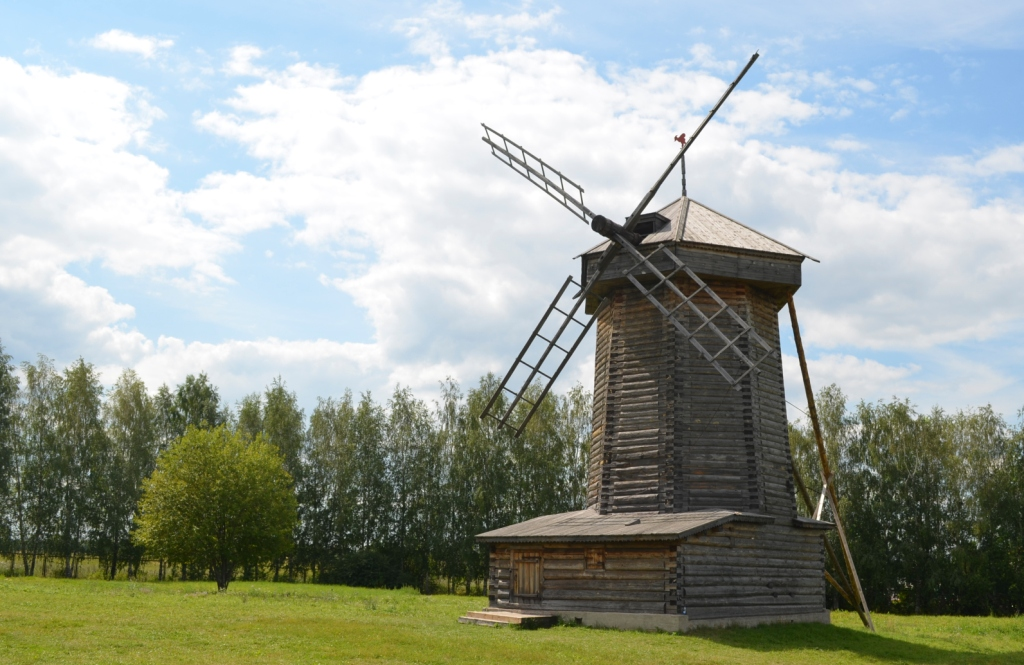
Log windmill in Russia

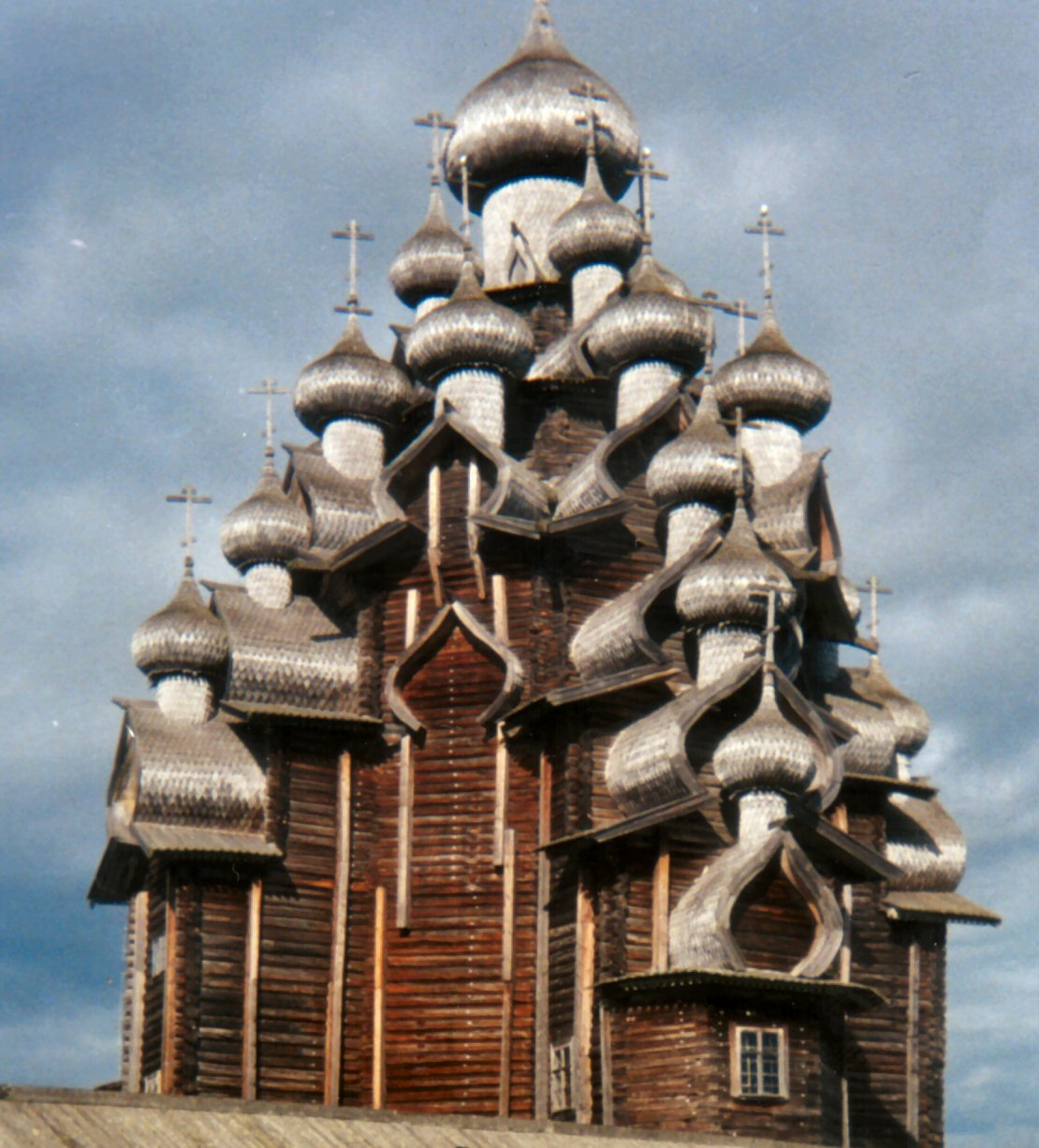
Log church, Kizhi, Russia

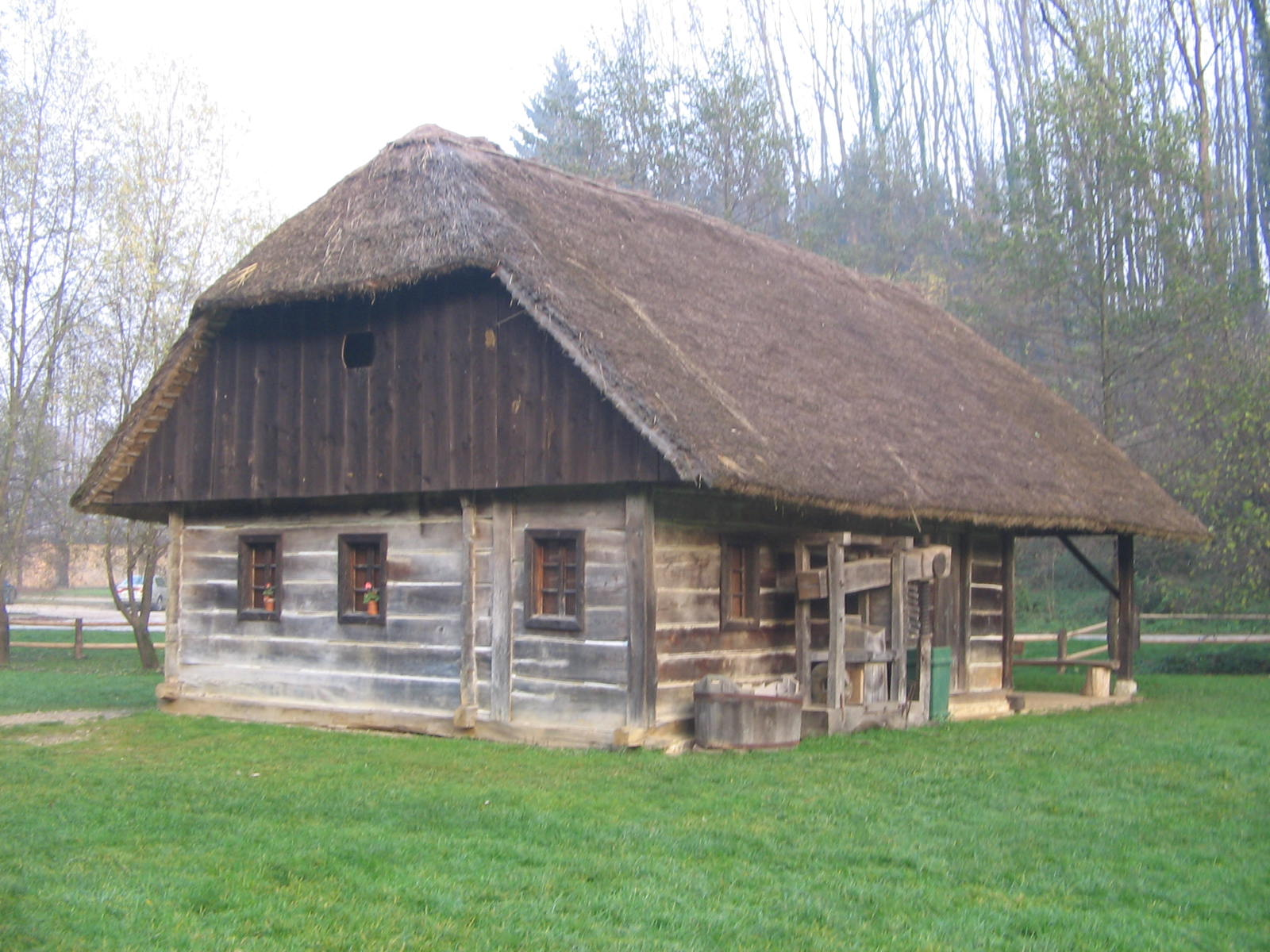
Corner post construction in an open-air museum in Slovenia

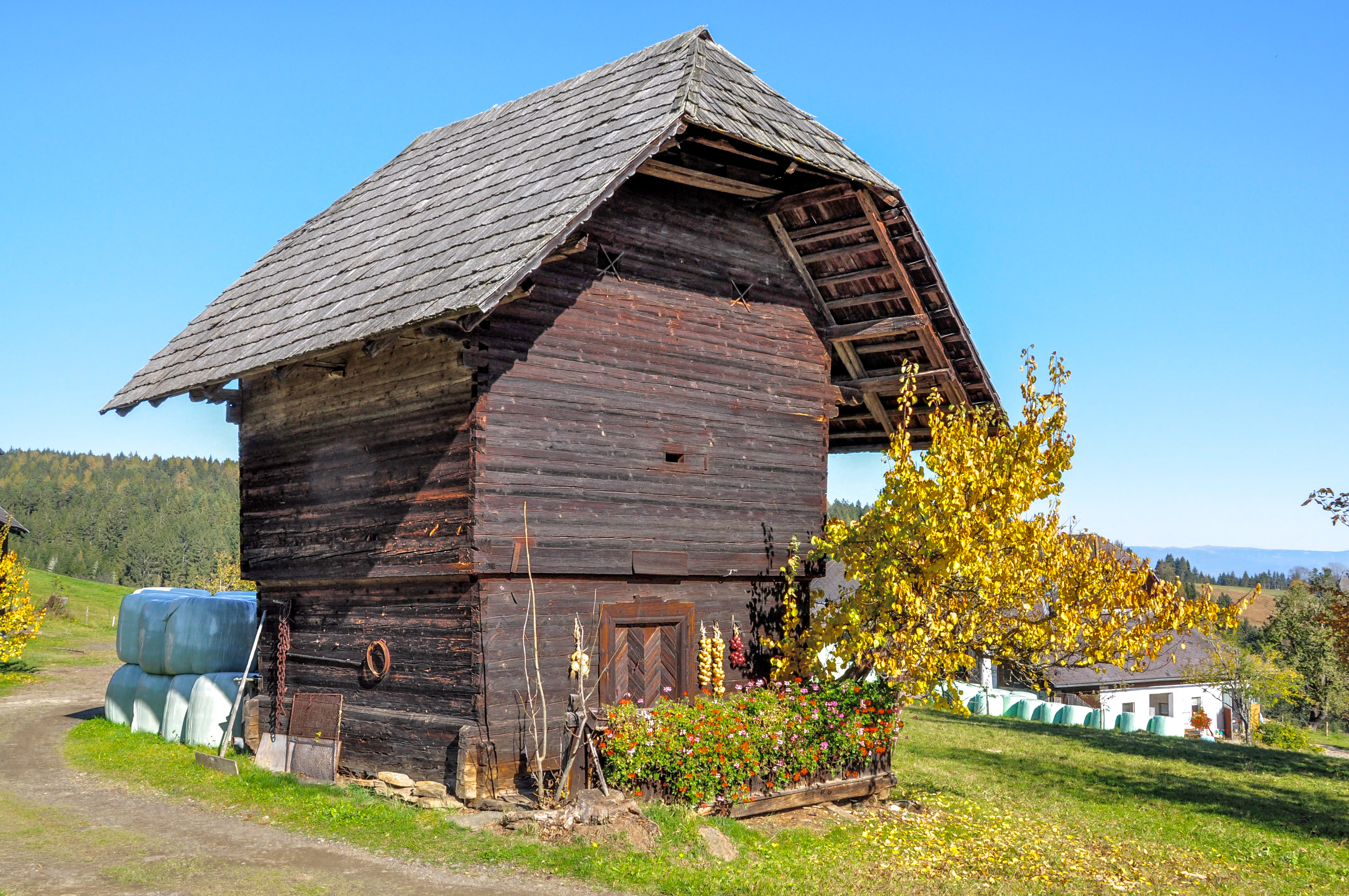
Baroque granary vulgo Prueger at Mitterdorf #10, Strassburg, Austria

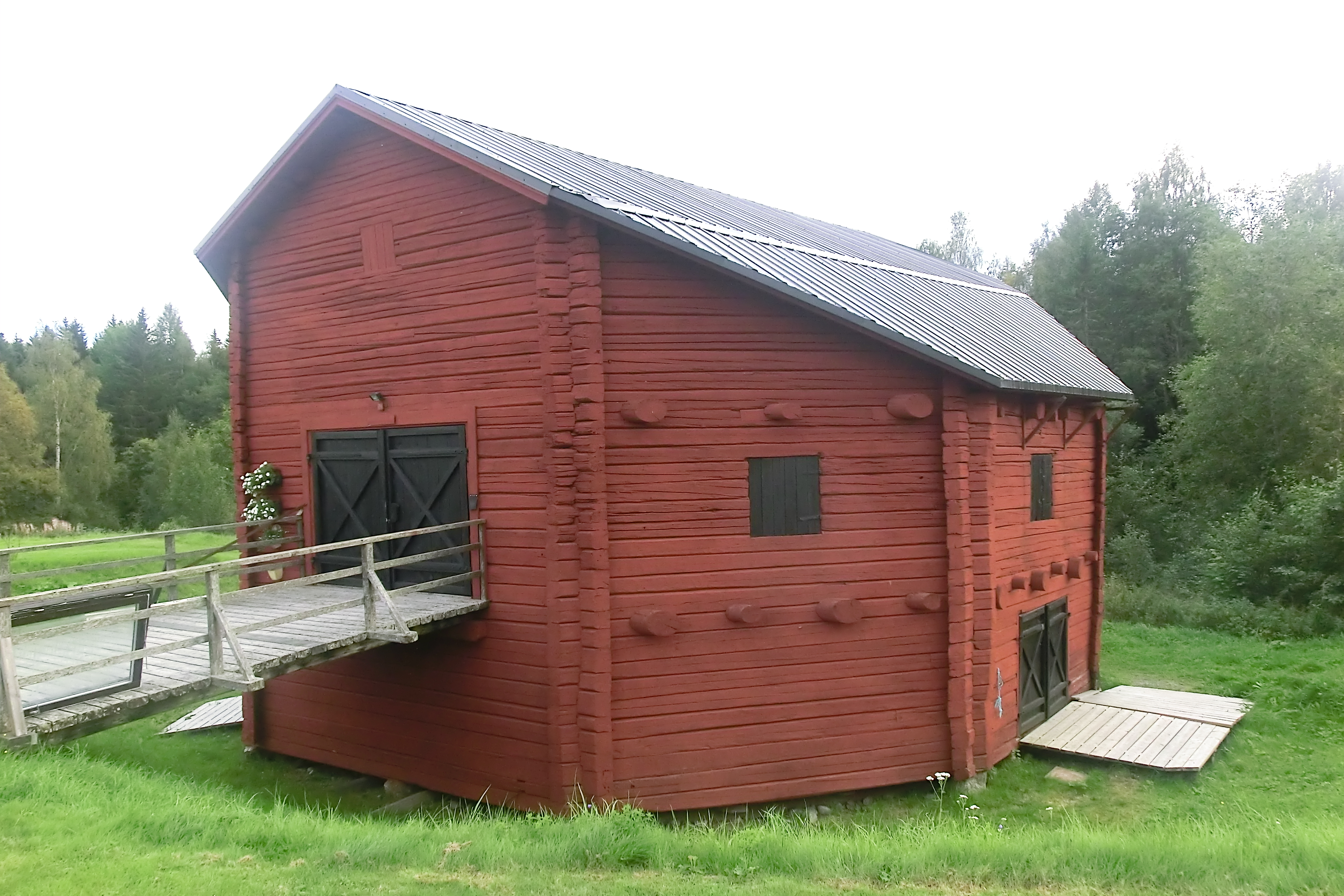
Three-story, octagonal, log threshing barn with a bridge to the second floor in Nätra, Sweden
