= Viktor Michailovich Ladviščenko =

Viktor Michailovič Ladviščenko was a Russian monumentalist painter, member of the USSR Artist Union.

Active throughout the 1960s and into the 1980s, he was one of the most representative members of the post-Stalinist current of the Socialist realism. Born in Leningrad, now St. Petersburg, in 1930, he completed his studies at the Academy of Fine Arts and Industries of Leningrad and graduated with a specialization in monumental painting. His diploma, designed in collaboration with his colleague Marat Ghirshevič Podoksin, was the celebration of the Red Army: with Podoskin, Ladviščenko conceived the project for the pictorial decoration of the main hall of the Museum of Military History of the Artillery in St. Petersburg. Their supervisors were A. Kazantsev and K. Ignatov.

== Work ==
Among the works that the State commissioned him to paint, there were the cartoons for the mosaics of the Museum of the Great October Revolution in St. Petersburg (former name of the Museum of Russian Political History), made in 1973 with his colleague M. Podoksin and the monumental fresco, painted in tempera in the Palace of Culture, called "The Metallurgic", in the city of Izhevsk, painted in collaboration with M. Podoskin as well (1975–76). In 1965, Ladviščenko participated in Moscow to the historic exhibition "In Defence of Peace", an event organized to celebrate the 20th anniversary of the victory of the USSR against the Nazi-fascist block. Among the participants there were artists like Dmitry Zhilinskij (1927 - 2005), who, on that occasion, displayed his famous painting "Gymnasts of the USSR". Throughout his artistic career, Ladviščenko always remained a member of the State association "Union of Artists of the USSR."
