= Tymanivka, Tulchyn Raion, Vinnytsia Oblast =

Village in Vinnytsia Oblast, Ukraine

Tymanivka Тиманівка
- Village
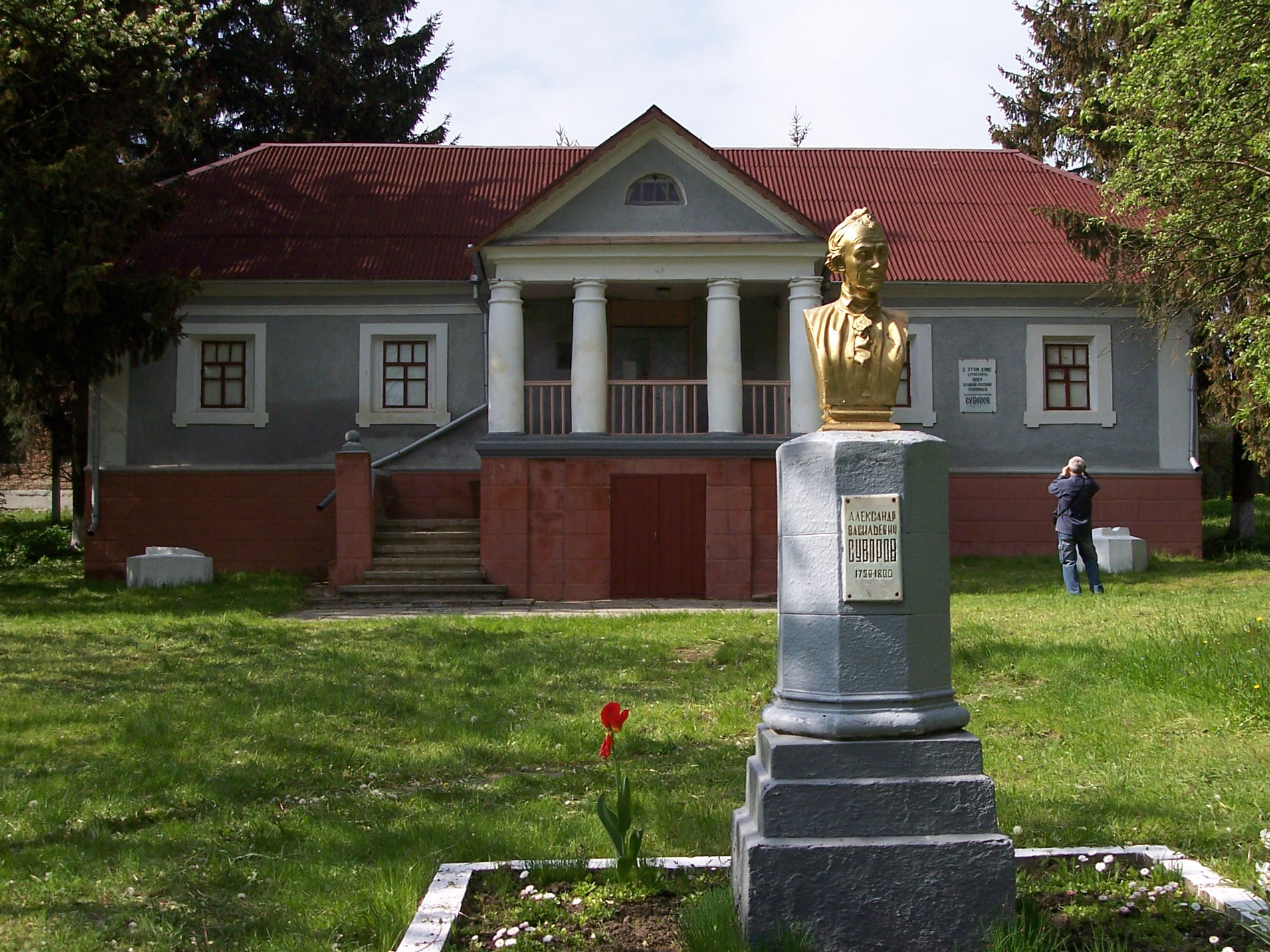
- Suvorov Museum in Tymanivka

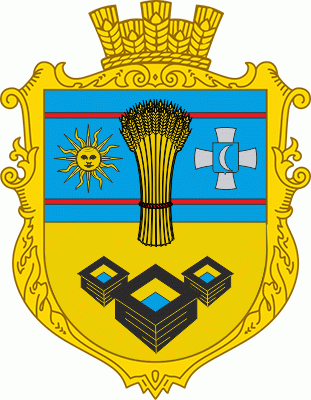
- Coat of arms

- Location in Vinnytsia Oblast Location in Ukraine
- Coordinates: 48°34′30″N 28°50′15″E
- Country: Ukraine
- Oblast: Vinnytsia Oblast
- Raion: Tulchyn Raion
- Hromada: Tulchyn urban hromada
- Founded: 1606

Area
  - Total: 4.98 km^{2} (1.92 sq mi)
- Elevation: 252 m (827 ft)

Population
  - Total: 1,942
  - Density: 390/km^{2} (1,010/sq mi)
- Time zone: UTC+2 (EET)
  - Summer (DST): UTC+3 (EEST)
- Postal code: 23644
- Area code: +380 4335

Tymanivka (Ukrainian: Тиманівка; Russian: Тимановка) is a village in Ukraine in Tulchyn Raion of Vinnytsia Oblast.

The KOATUU is 0524386201. The population Census of 2001 registered 1942 people. Its Postal Code is 23644. Telephone code is 4335. It encompasses an area of 4.98 square kilometers.

== Attractions ==
- Suvorov Museum
