= Azekura-zukuri =

Japanese architectural style

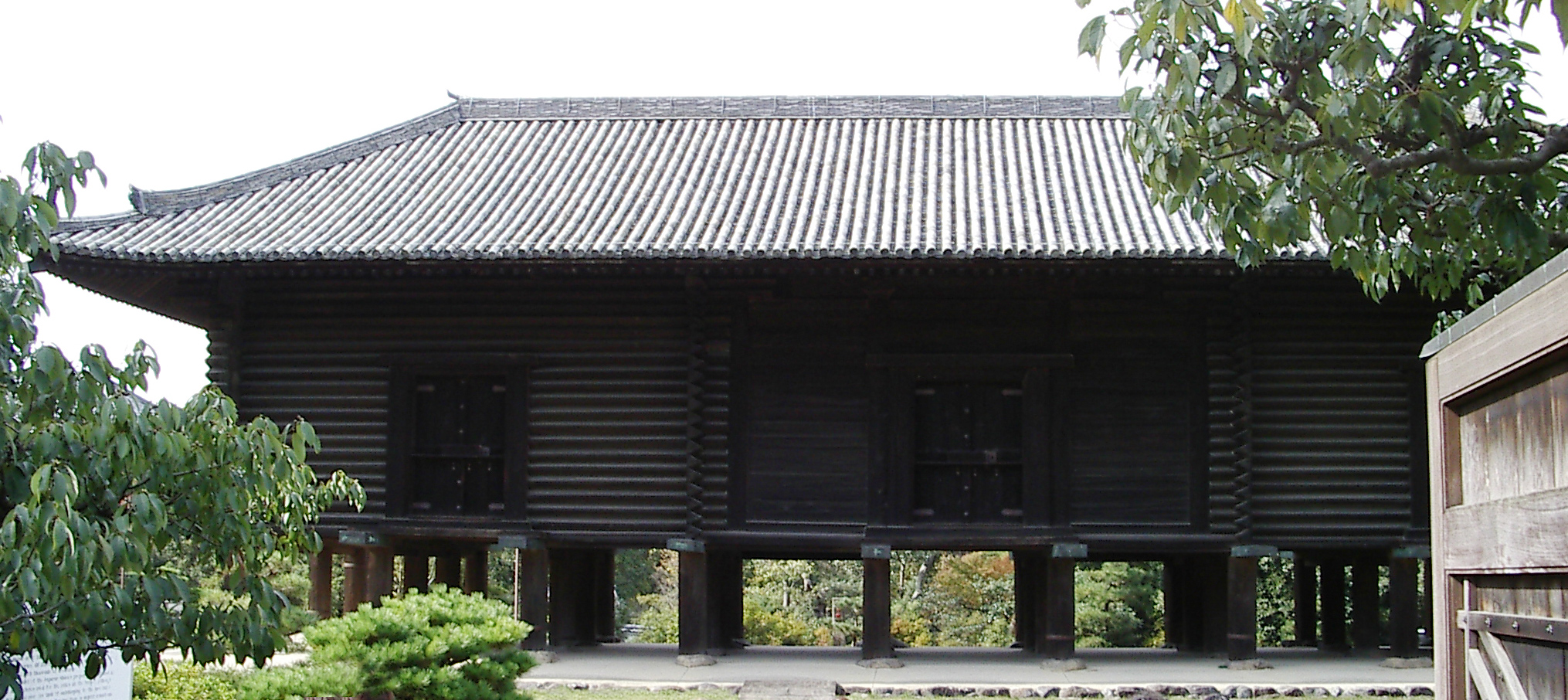
The Shōsō-in treasure house, built c. 759, is the oldest and largest azekura-zukuri structure in existence.

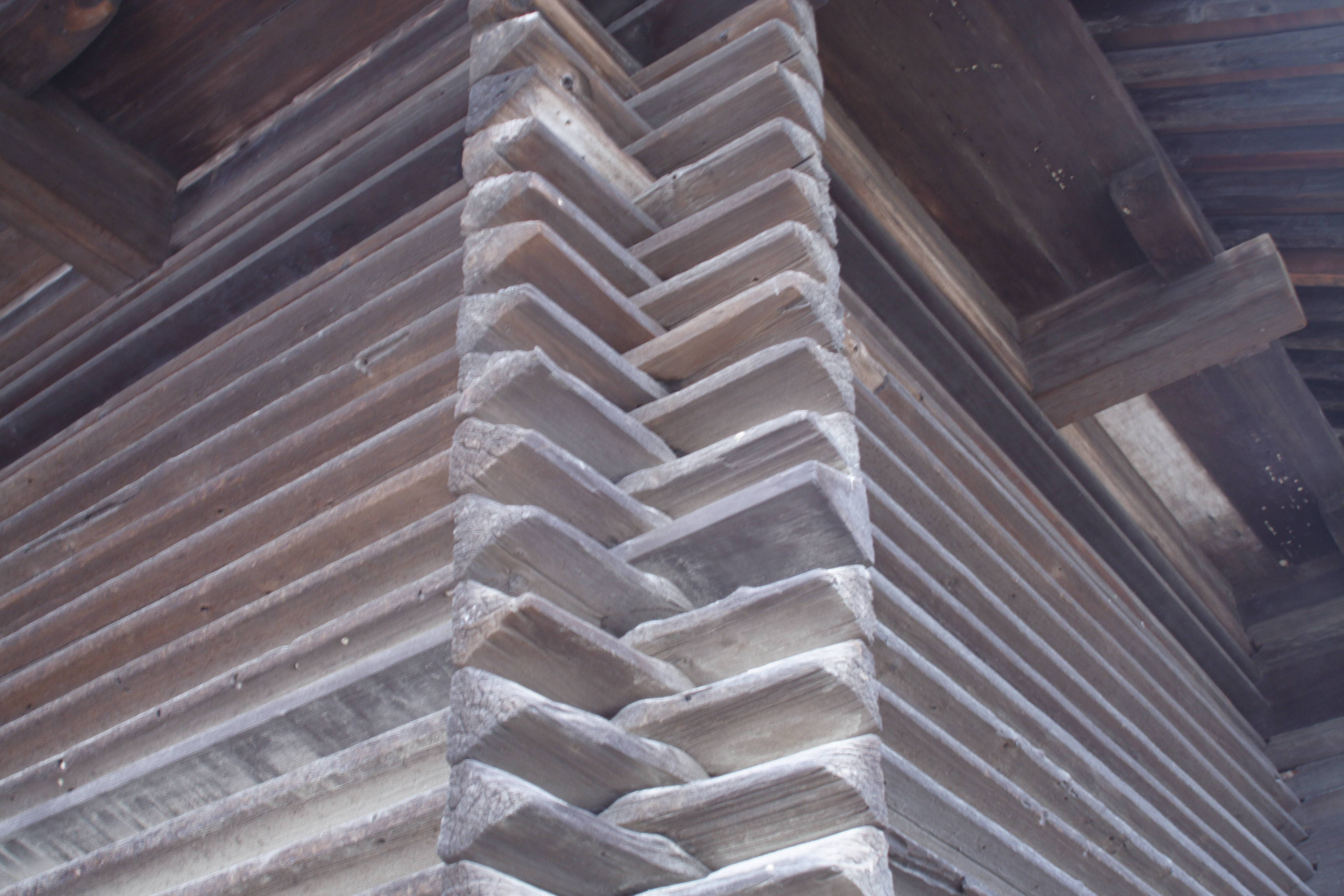
Details of beam installation at the corner of a storehouse at Tōdai-ji Temple

Azekura-zukuri (校倉造) or azekura is a Japanese architectural style of simple wooden construction, used for storehouses (kura), granaries, and other utilitarian structures. This style probably dates back to the early centuries of the Common Era, such as during the Yayoi or Kofun periods. It is characterized by joined-log structures of triangular cross-section, and is commonly made out of cypress timbers.

Azekura-zukuri developed as a form of agricultural storage building, used by village carpenters to house grain and other foodstuffs. It was subsequently used for repositories holding the possessions of Buddhist temples. Surviving examples are associated with the temple complexes of Tōdai-ji and Tōshōdai-ji in Nara.

== Construction ==
The wall timbers, known as azegi, are laid horizontally in successive courses. Triangular sections are the most common, but round, square and hexagonal sections also occur. The triangular timbers have a flat face towards the interior, while their exposed outer faces are slightly concave. They were easier to hew than thick planks and were more resistant to weathering. The interlocking corners are constructed without corner posts. The flat inner faces form a smooth wall, while the angled outer faces give the exterior a serrated profile.

Most azekura are relatively small buildings with a single storage chamber. They usually have a hip roof, and many employ a roof structure with two tiers of beams and supporting struts. Storehouses built with round logs are called marukikura, while those enclosed with thick timber planks are called itakura.

== Surviving examples ==
The Shōsōin repository at Tōdai-ji dates to the middle of the eighth century. Its north and south chambers have azekura walls, while the central chamber is enclosed with planks. Built of cypress, the repository stands on forty columns resting on stone bases.

Other surviving buildings include the sutra repositories at Tōdai-ji's Hokkedō and Kanjinsho, and the sutra repository and treasure house at Tōshōdai-ji.

== See also ==
- Log building
- Shōsōin
- Japanese carpentry
