= State Museum of the History of Saint Petersburg =

Museum in Saint Petersburg, Russia

Coordinates: 59.9485°N 30.3236°E

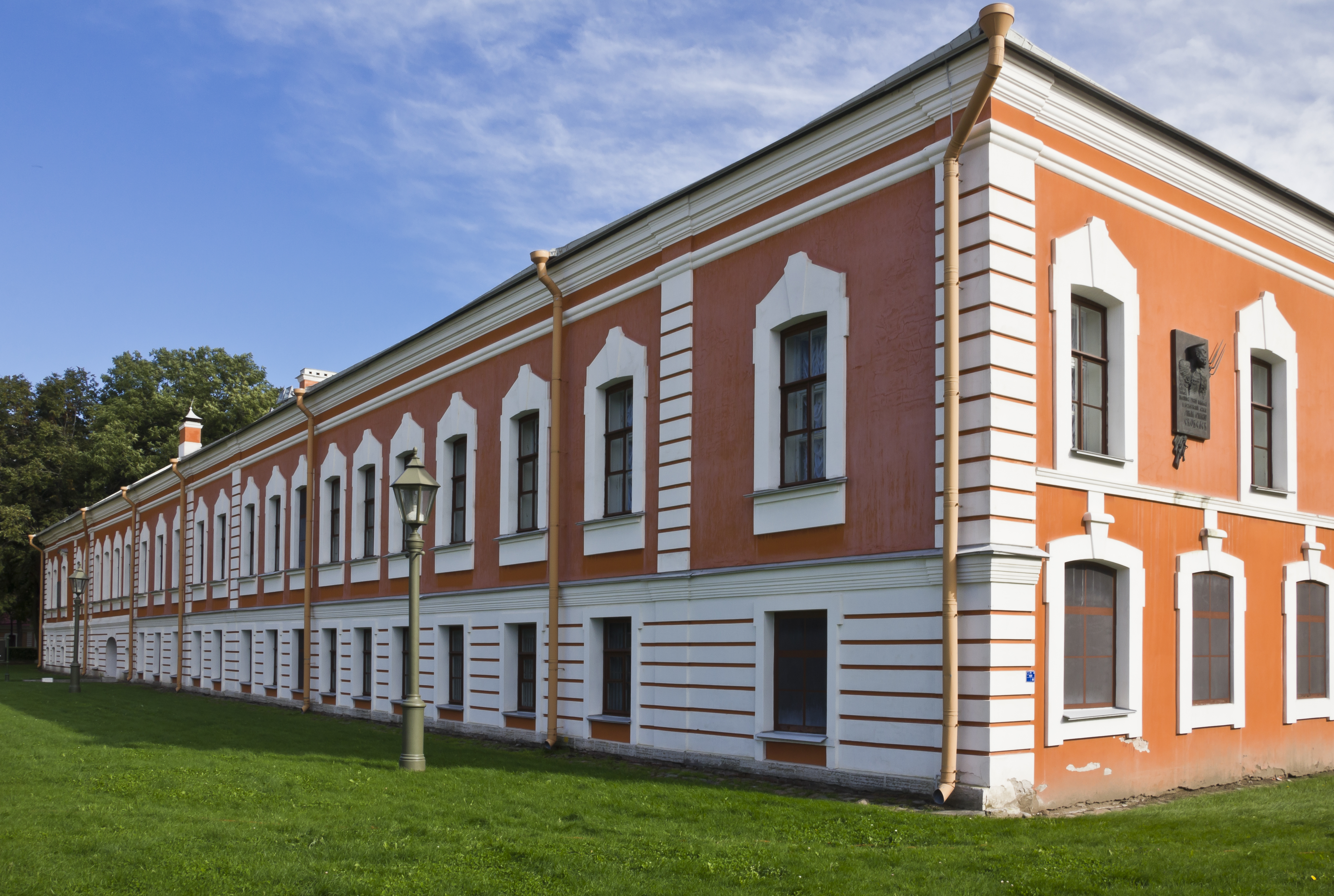
The museum's main exhibition is in the former Commandant's House of the Peter and Paul Fortress

The State Museum of the History of Saint Petersburg (Russian: Государственный музей истории Санкт-Петербурга) is a museum of the history of the city of Saint Petersburg, Russia.

The headquarters of the museum are located in the Peter and Paul Fortress. A museum of the city's history was established in 1908 as the Museum of Old Saint Petersburg. It became the City Museum in 1918, and then the Museum of History and Development of Leningrad in 1938. In 1951 it was renamed the Museum of Architecture of Leningrad, and in 1953 it became the State Museum of the History of Leningrad.

During the Second World War, following the Axis invasion of the Soviet Union, the museum's contents were evacuated to Sarapul. The first full historical exhibitions began in 1957, celebrating the 250th anniversary of Leningrad.

== See also ==
- List of museums in Saint Petersburg
