= Shōsōin =

Buddhist temple in Nara Prefecture, Japan

Coordinates: 34°41′31″N 135°50′19″E

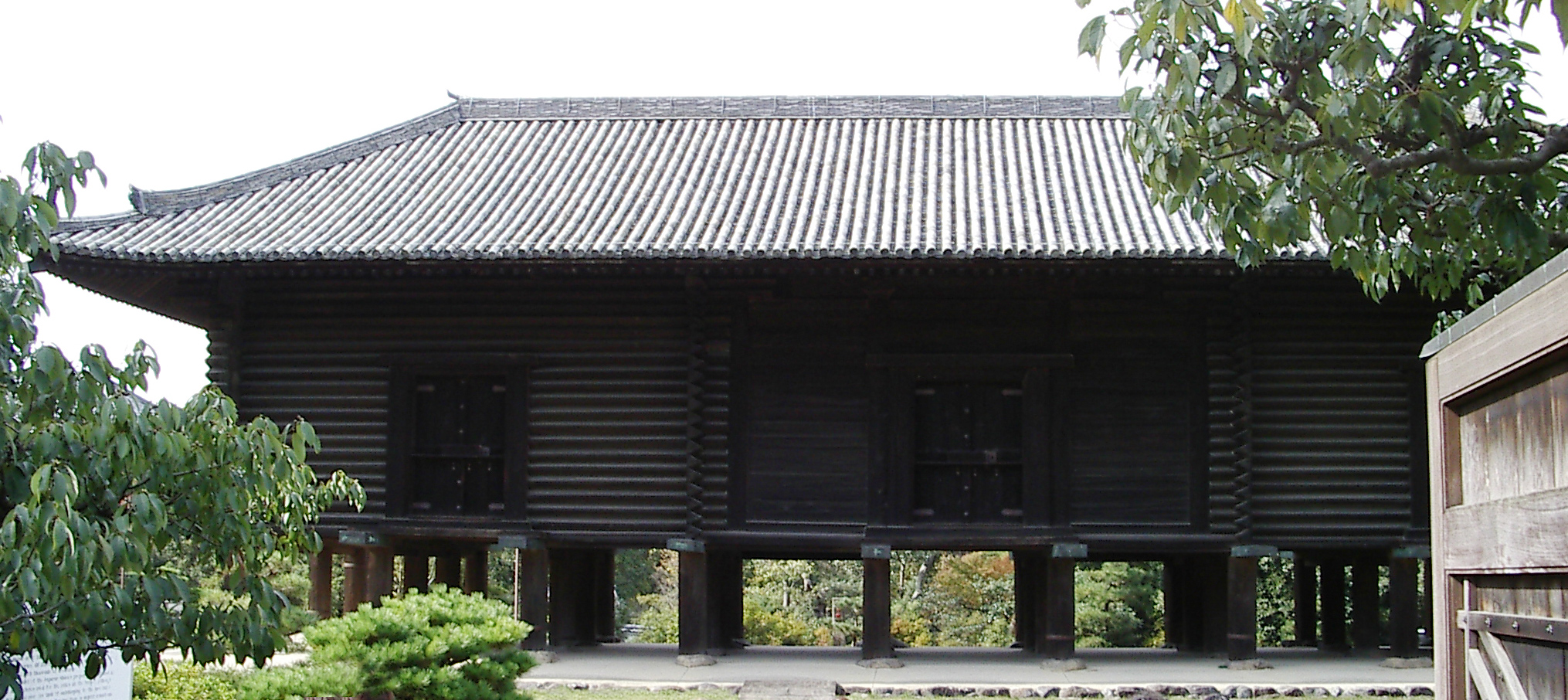
Shōsō-in

The Shōsō-in (正倉院) is the treasure house of Tōdai-ji Temple in Nara, Japan. The building is in the azekura (log-cabin) style with a raised floor. It lies to the northwest of the Great Buddha Hall. The Shōsō-in houses artifacts connected to Emperor Shōmu (聖武天皇, 701–756) and Empress Kōmyō (光明皇后, 701–760), as well as arts and crafts of the Tempyō (天平) era of Japanese history.

== History ==
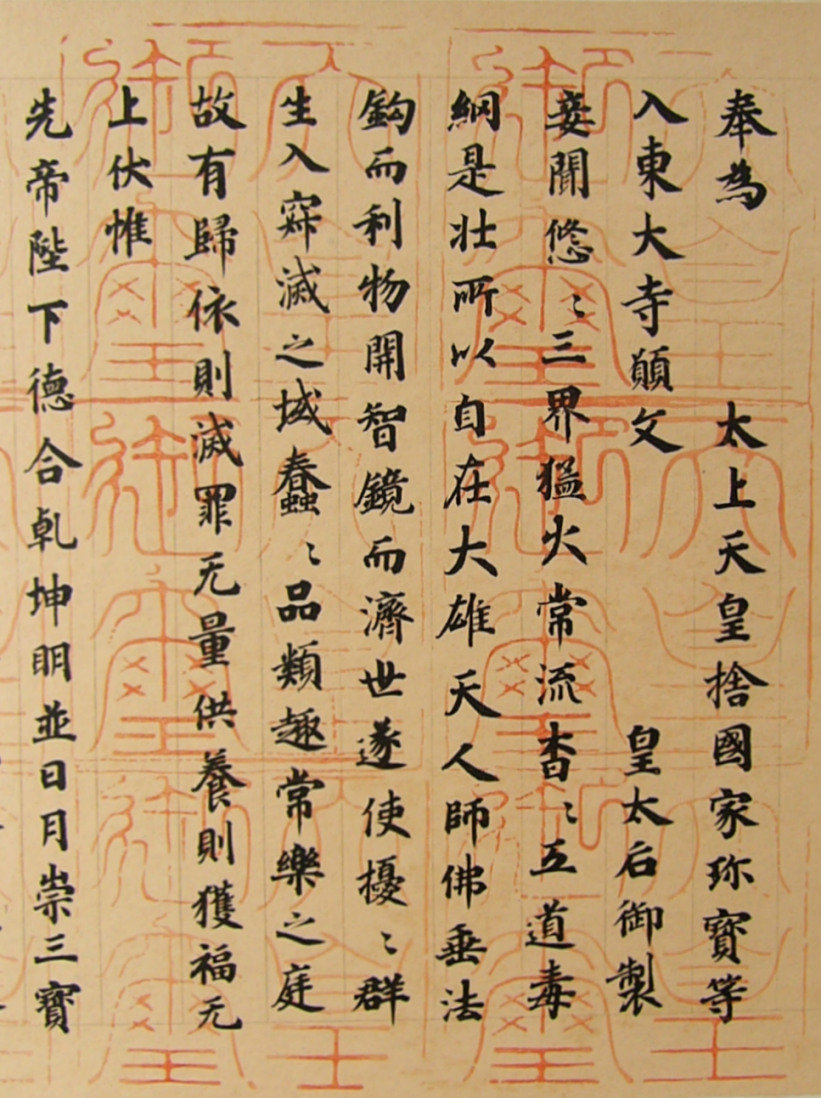
Dedicatory records of Tōdai-ji temple, 756

The construction of the Tōdai-ji Buddhist temple complex was ordained by Emperor Shōmu as part of a national project of Buddhist temple construction. During the Tempyō period, the years during which Emperor Shōmu reigned, multiple disasters struck Japan as well as political uproar and epidemics. Because of these reasons Emperor Shōmu launched a project of provincial temples. The Tōdai-ji was appointed as the head temple of these provincial temples. Emperor Shōmu was a strong supporter of Buddhism and he thought it would strengthen his central authority as well. The origin of Tōdai-ji's Shōsō-in repository itself dates back to 756, when Empress Kōmyō dedicated over 600 items to the Great Buddha at Tōdai-ji to express her love for her lost husband, Emperor Shōmu, who had died 49 days earlier. Her donation was made over five times across several years, then stored at the Shōsō-in. During the Heian period, a large number of treasures, consisting of items and instruments used in important Buddhist services were transferred from a different warehouse called the Kensakuin to the Tōdai-ji.

After the Meiji Restoration, it came under the administration of the national government, and since World War II has been under the administration of the Imperial Household Agency. It is on the UNESCO register of World Heritage Sites as one of the Historic Monuments of Ancient Nara. It is also a National Treasure of Japan.

== Building ==
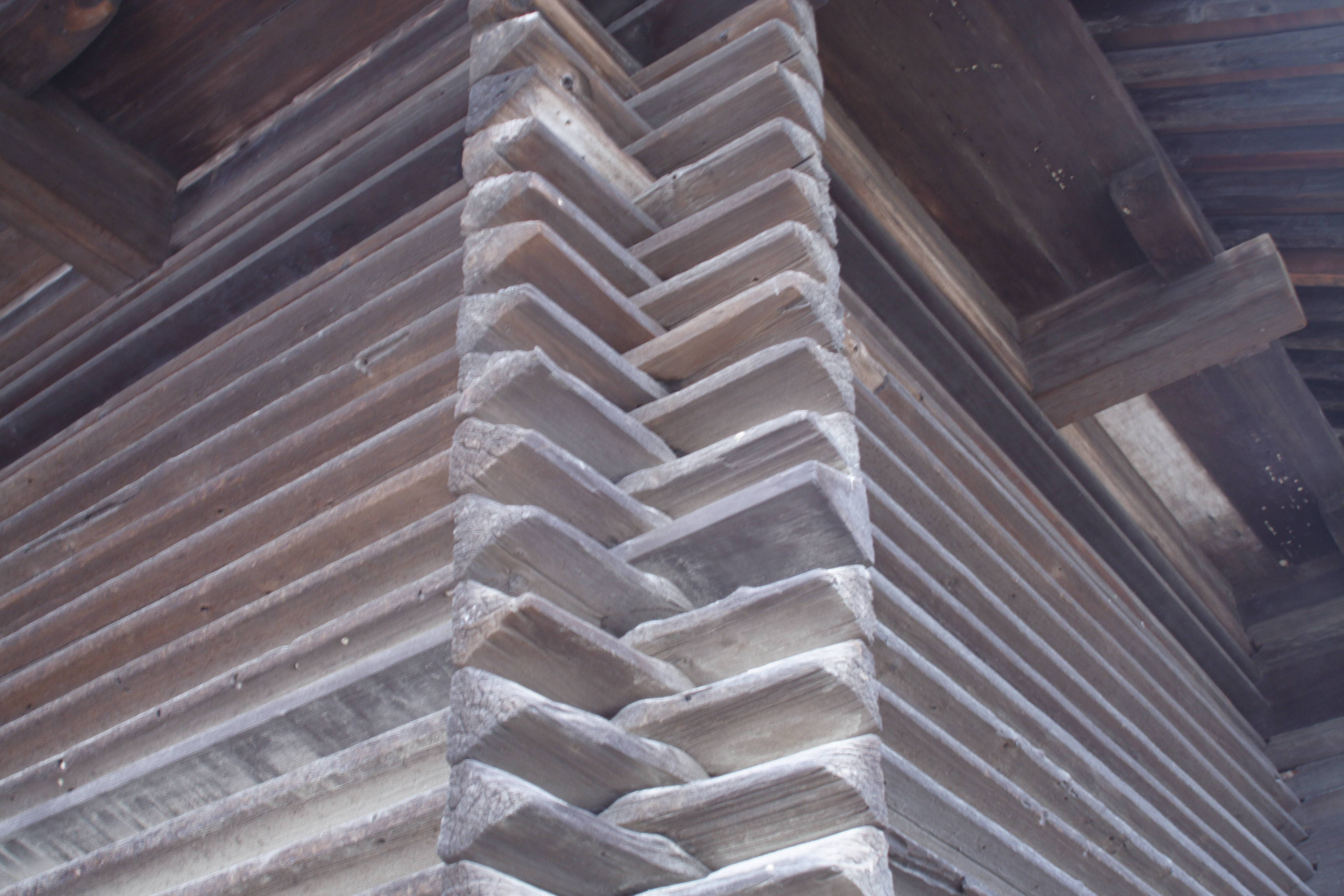
Azekura style of architecture on another store house at the Tōdai-ji

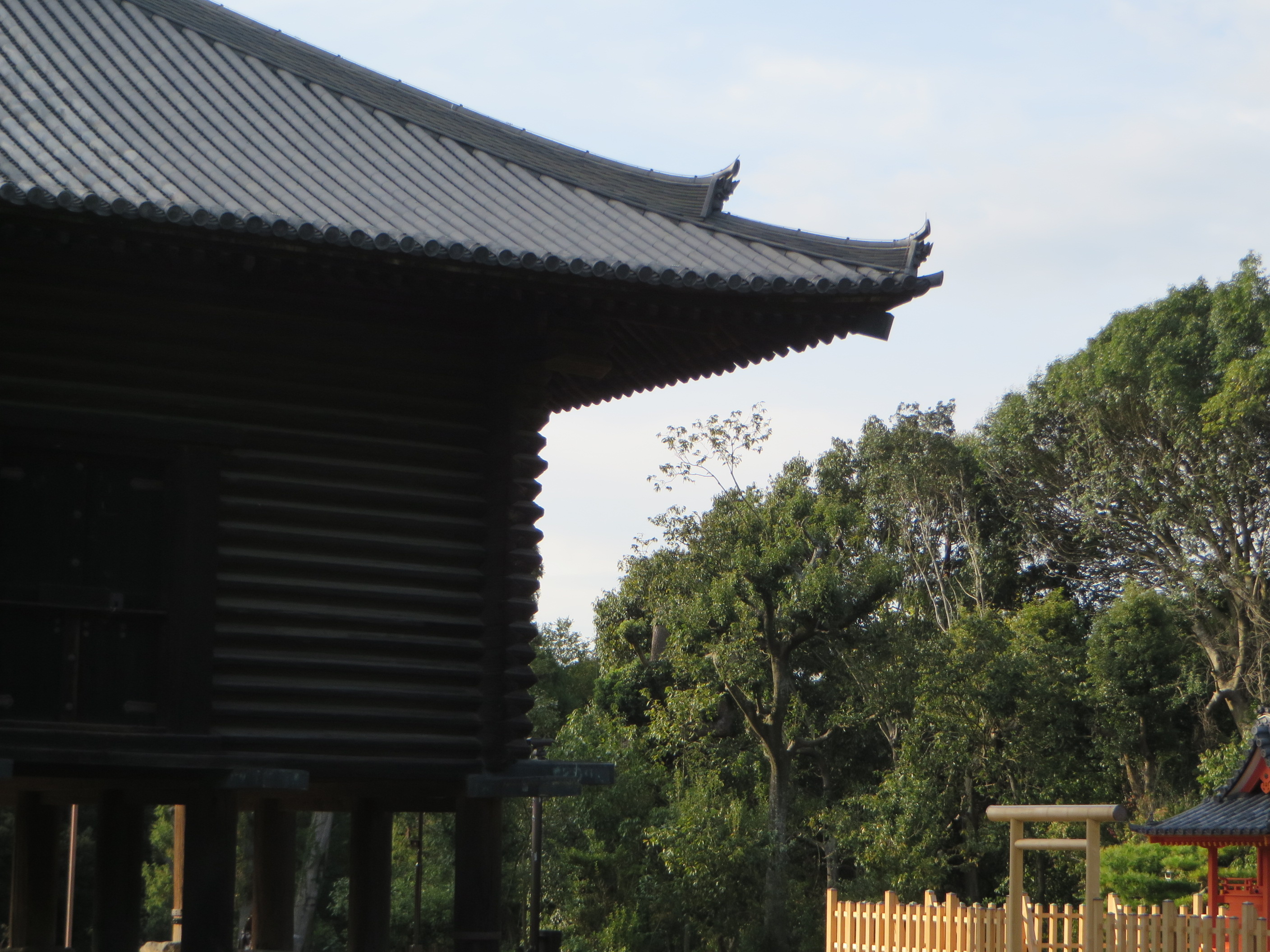
Detail of the Shōsōin

The building is in the Azekura Zukuri log-cabin style, with a floor raised to about 2.5 m (8 ft 2 in) takayuka-shiki (高床式). This is an architectural style that was mainly used for the construction of granaries and storehouses. Some distinctive features of this building style are the triangular, wooden beams that come together in the corners, as well as the fact that it was assembled without using any bolts nor nails. This could be slightly surprising for its height of 14 m (46 ft), width of 33 m (108 ft) and depth of about 9.3 m (31 ft). However, it was a logical and smart step. As a result of assembling the storehouse without bolts or nails, the structure became very flexible and able to withstand earthquakes, a phenomenon of nature with which Japan was already well acquainted during the Nara period. The Shōsō-in is also the only building to survive the Siege of Nara in the Heian period. The exact construction date is unclear, but construction works probably started soon after the empress's bequest in AD 756 and definitely were finished before AD 759, when the bequest items storage lists were complete.

== Preservation of the artifacts ==
Since the Shōsō-in was to be a repository for valuable objects, it was constructed to create a natural climate regulation system. This natural climate regulation system was created by elevating the floor to a height of 2.7 m. This made circulation of air underneath the building possible and protected the structure against humidity at the same time. In addition to this, during the first few decades after its construction, the triangular beams of the Japanese cypress might have functioned as a natural regulator of humidity and temperature. The artefacts themselves were stored away in chests made from cedar wood, which is known for its durability. These chests were 90–110 cm long, 60–70 cm wide and 40–50 cm high. Not only the building itself but also these chests were elevated from the ground. All these adjustments made it possible to preserve the treasures in perfect state.

== Treasures ==
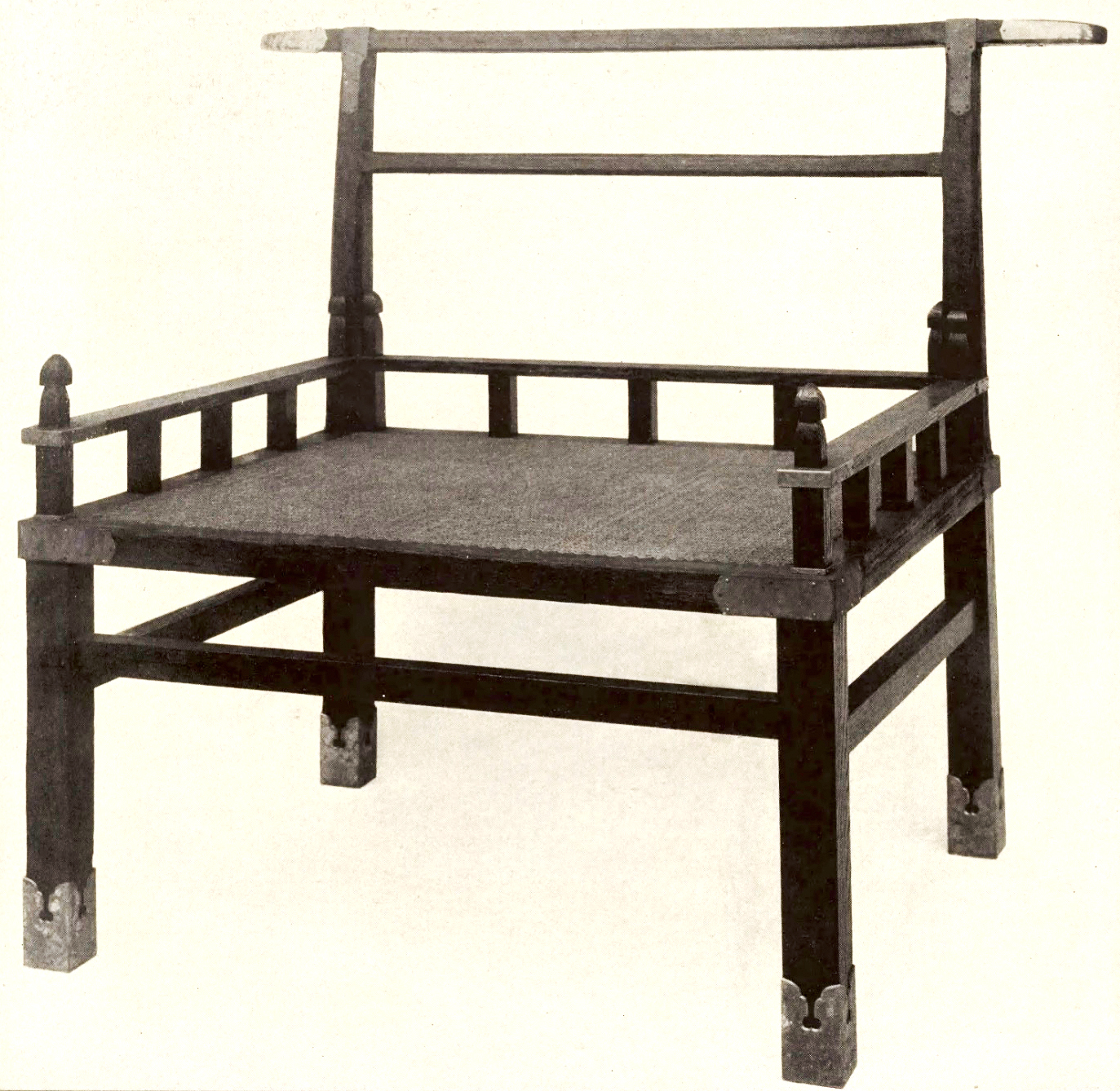
Chair of red-lacquered keyaki (zelkova wood), Shōsōin

The Shōsō-in today holds around 9,000 items, excluding items that are yet to be classified. The treasures that were donated by Empress Kōmyō were stored in the Hoku Sō (北倉), the northern part of the Shōsōin. From the very beginning, this part of the Shōsō-in has been sealed by the imperial family. One was permitted to enter only with explicit permission of the imperial family Other sections are called Chūsō (中倉, middle repository) and Nanōo (南倉, southern repository). Ninety-five percent of the fine arts and crafts in the Shōsōin were produced in Japan around the 8th century, with the remainder imported from the Tang dynasty, Central Asia, India, Iran, etc. during the same period. The designs of these Japanese and East Asian treasures show Iranian, Greek, Roman, and Egyptian influences due to cultural exchange via the Silk Road.

Although these collections are not open to the public, selections are shown at Nara National Museum once a year in autumn.

The objects and treasures that have been stored in the Shōsō-in can be divided into the following categories.

- Buddhist objects Butsugu (仏具)
- Clothing and accessories Fukushoku (服飾)
- Furniture Chōdo Hin (調度品)
- Games Yūgi gu (遊戯具)
- Musical instruments Gakki (楽器)
- Weaponry Buji (武事)

== Documents ==
Generally considered separate from the treasures, the Shōsōin also preserved more than 10,000 documents, mostly from an eighth-century scriptorium. These documents contain diverse materials including censuses, tax records, and poetry. The vast majority of documents, however, record the day-to-day record keeping of a sutra copying office active, albeit under a number of different names, between 727–776. The collection is perhaps unparalleled globally as a tightly focused eighth-century archival collection of manuscripts.

The documents were first rediscovered in the 1830s by an antiquarian scholar named Hoida Tadatomo. Hoida and his successors peeled individual sheets apart and reassembled them into new scrolls, disrupting the original organization of the documents. Print versions of most of the documents were published in the first twenty-five volumes of Dai Nihon komonjo beginning in 1901. Subsequent scholarship has allowed scholars to better understand how the scrolls were originally configured. They have also been digitized and are now publicly available for viewing.

== Silk collection ==
Since 1994, the Imperial Household Agency's Office of the Shoso-in Treasure House, which is responsible for the administration of the repository, has been producing exact reproduction of ancient Nara textiles. Apart from the appearance and colour, care has been given to reproduce the production and weaving style. The silk is donated each year by Empress Masako, who personally runs the Momijiyama Imperial Cocoonery at Tokyo Imperial Palace.

== See also ==
- Kura (storehouse)
- Ranjatai – a famous piece of agarwood used in incense held by the repository
- The Kamakura Museum of National Treasures designed to resemble the Shōsō-in, also holds a fine collection of Japanese art and sculpture.
