= Moscow Design Museum =

Museum in Moscow, Russia

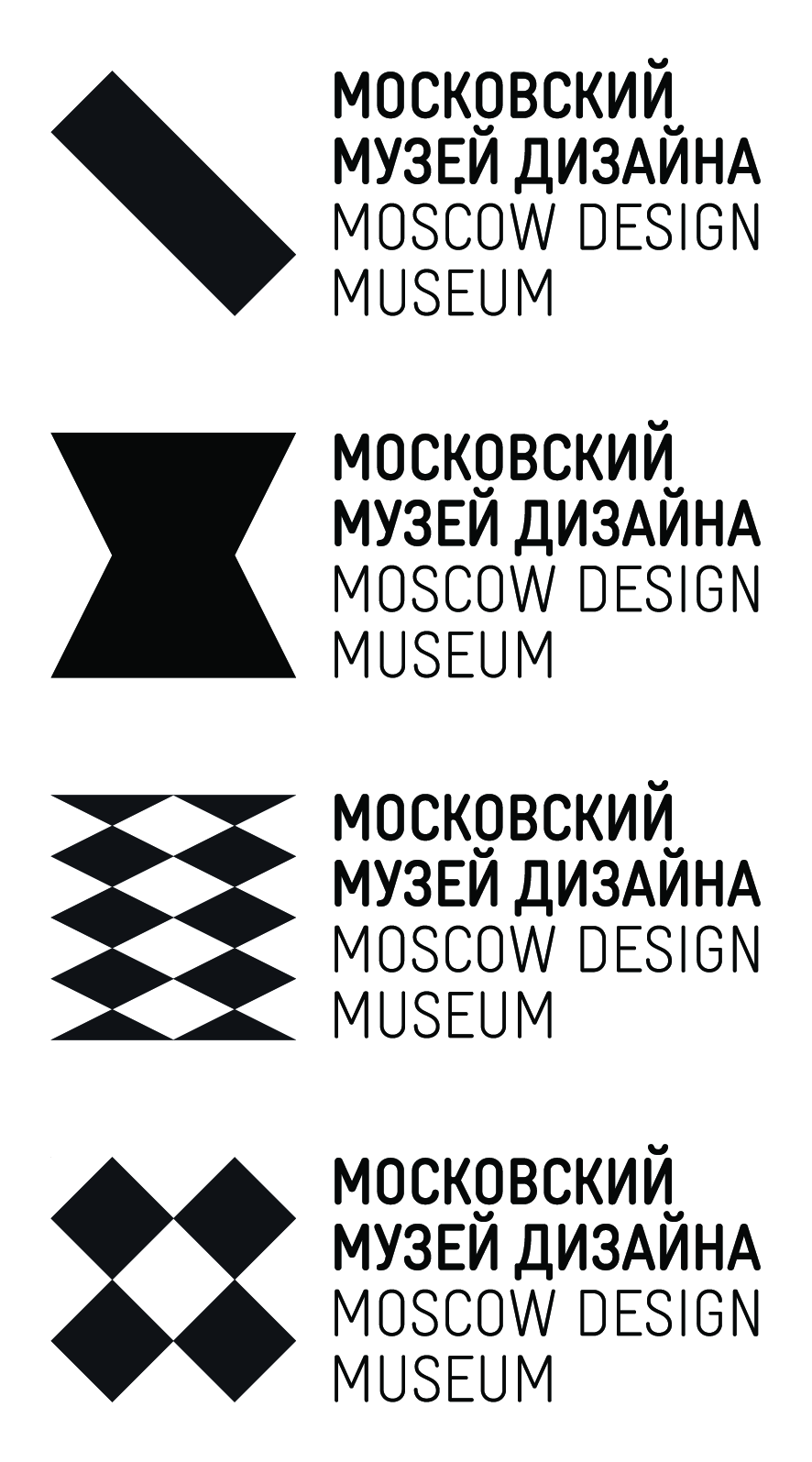

- Location within Moscow
- Established: 2012
- Location: Russia, Moscow, 1 Manezhnaya Square
- Coordinates: 55.7535°N 37.6125°E
- Website: moscowdesignmuseum.ru/en/

Moscow Design Museum is a private cultural organization founded in May, 2012. It was created by a team of art historians, designers, journalists, curators and architects. The main objectives of the project are to promote Russian design, educate the public about visual culture and further international cooperation.

== Museum Opening ==
Moscow Design Museum opened in the end of November, 2012 in CEH “Manege”.

== Articles on Moscow Design Museum ==
Article on Moscow Design Museum in The New York Times Style Magazine.

Article on Moscow Design Museum in RIA Novosti.
