= Dmitri Plekhanov =

Russian ice hockey player

- Born: March 13, 1978 (age 48) Nizhnekamsk, USSR
- Height: 6 ft 2 in (188 cm)
- Weight: 207 lb (94 kg; 14 st 11 lb)
- Position: Defence
- Shot: Left
- Played for: HC Neftekhimik Nizhnekamsk; Vityaz Chekhov
- NHL draft: 232nd overall, 1997; St. Louis Blues
- Playing career: 1996–2004

Dmitri Plekhanov (born March 13, 1978) is a Russian former professional ice hockey defenceman. He played in the Russian Superleague for HC Neftekhimik Nizhnekamsk and Vityaz Chekhov. He was drafted 232nd overall in the 1997 NHL entry draft by the St. Louis Blues.
