= Alliluyev =

Alliluyev (masculine, Russian: Аллилу́ев) or Alliluyeva (feminine, Russian: Аллилу́ева) is a Russian surname. Lauterbach associates the name (which he transcribes as Alliluiev) with the exclamation "Hallelujah" (Russian: аллилуйя - alliluyya, Latin: Alleluia).

== Notable people ==
- Joseph Alliluyev (1945–2008), Russian cardiologist.
- Nadezhda Alliluyeva (1901–1932), wife of Joseph Stalin.
- Svetlana Alliluyeva (1926–2011), daughter of Joseph Stalin and Soviet defector.
