= Vladimir Plekhanov =

Russian firearms designer

Vladimir Plekhanov (born 20 October 1920) was a noted Russian firearms designer of the 20th century, not to be confused with the Vladimir G. Plekhanov the computer scientist specializing in isotope behavior.

Plekhanov worked closely with Mikhail Kalashnikov, the designer of the famed AK-47 (Avtomat Kalashnikova 47), throughout the 1940s. Although Kalashnikov denies that the AK-47 design is based on the German Sturmgewehr 44, it is believed that Plekhanov procured a Sturmgewehr 44 and may have introduced it to Kalashnikov in the early 1940s.
