= Suvorov Museum, Tymanivka =

Suvorov Museum
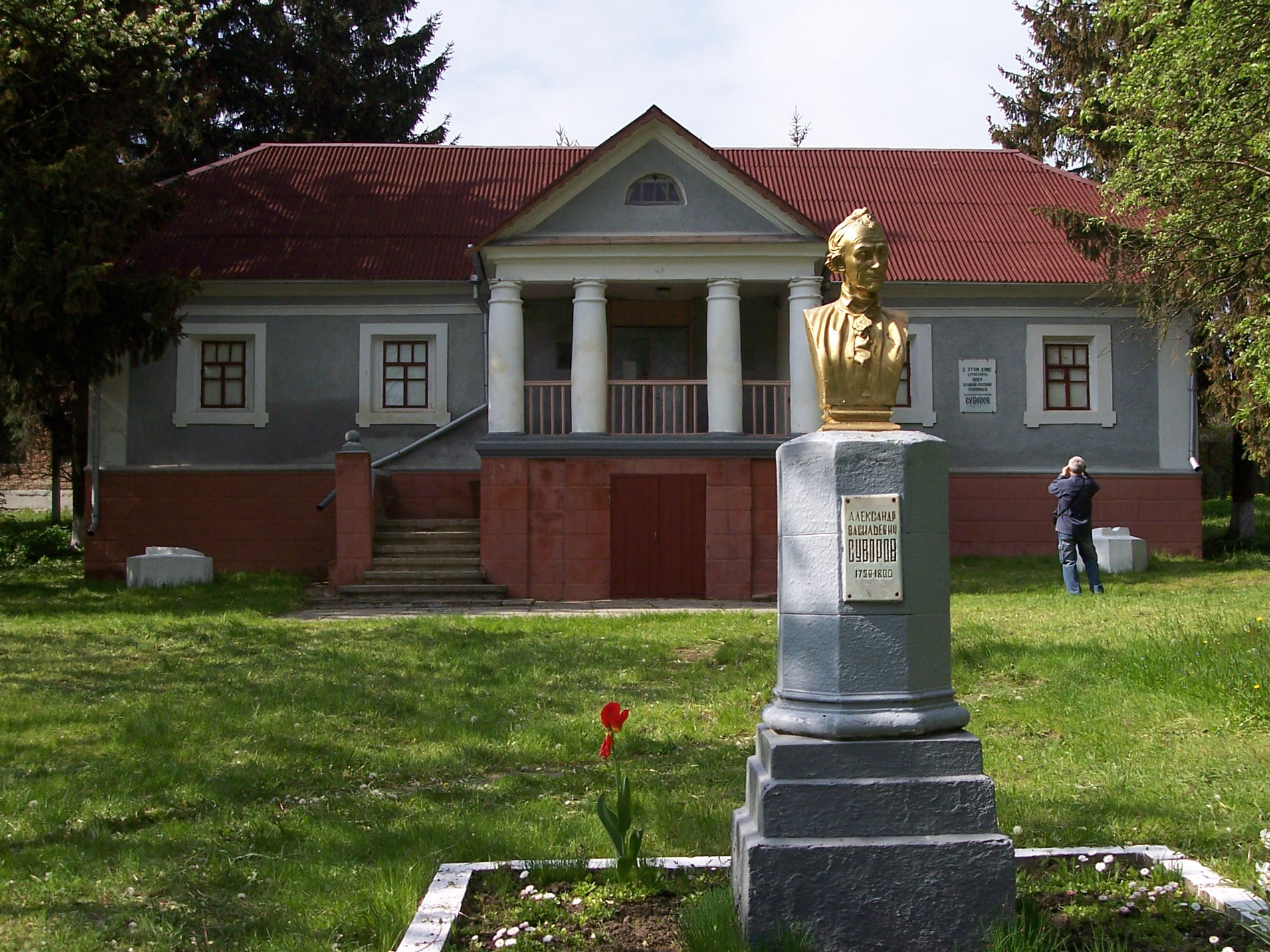
- Exterior of the museum
- Established: 1947
- Location: Tymanivka, Tulchyn Raion, Vinnytsia Oblast, Ukraine
- Coordinates: 48.57612°N 28.83928°E
- Type: Historical museum
- Visitors: 3600
- Director: Varvaruk Lubov Stepanivna

The Suvorov Museum (Russian: and Ukrainian: Музей Суворова) is a historical and military museum in Tymanivka, Tulchyn Raion, Vinnytsia Oblast, Ukraine, dedicated to the memory of Russian Generalissimo Alexander Suvorov (1729–1800), who stayed and trained his troops in that area in 1796–1797.

== Background ==
Suvorov lived in Tymanivka from 1796 to 1797, staying at the house of the Timanivka estate local manager in the center of the village. Suvorov's headquarters were situated nearby in Tulchyn at that time. There was a field camp with special facilities to train soldiers and officers before military campaigns. Suvorov used his time there to write his famous book Science of Victory (Nauka Pobezhdat). In the area there still exists military barracks.

== History of the museum ==
The museum was founded in 1947 in the house in which Suvorov used to live in. The museum was established by an initiative by Pilip Oleksiovych Gelyuk, the chairman of the local collective farm "Red October", with support from all inhabitants of the village, along with help and support in funds from the Leningrad Historical Museum of Artillery. Much of the organization of the museum was carried out by its first director, О. Shvets, and the teachers P. Novikov and N. Kozak-Novikova. In 1954, a statue of Suvorov was placed in front of the museum. In 1967, the museum was granted the rank of folk museum and included into the main tourist's routes. At this point more than 300 delegations from all over the world had already visited the museum. From 1991 to 2002, historical conferences and meetings were organised which took place at all six museums dedicated to A. Suvorov: Saint Petersburg, Konchanskoye-Suvorovckoye in Russia, Ochakiv, Izmail, Tymanivka in Ukraine, Kobrin in Belarus. The museum has a collection of approximately 1300 objects, and annually has about 3600 visitors.

== Exposition ==
The main collection of the museum is based on artifacts found while digging in the area: coins, fragments of rifles, cannons, drums and others. There are unique displays: collections of officers and soldier's uniforms from the Russian army (end of the 18th century); weapons, ensigns, flags of Russian, French, Turkish troops (18th century); collection of coins from 18th century. Many exhibits were donated to the museum by private collectors.

== See also ==
- Suvorov Museum, in Saint Petersburg, Russia
