= Rimsky-Korsakov Apartment and Museum =

Museum in Saint Petersburg, Russia

Coordinates: 59.9246°N 30.3409°E

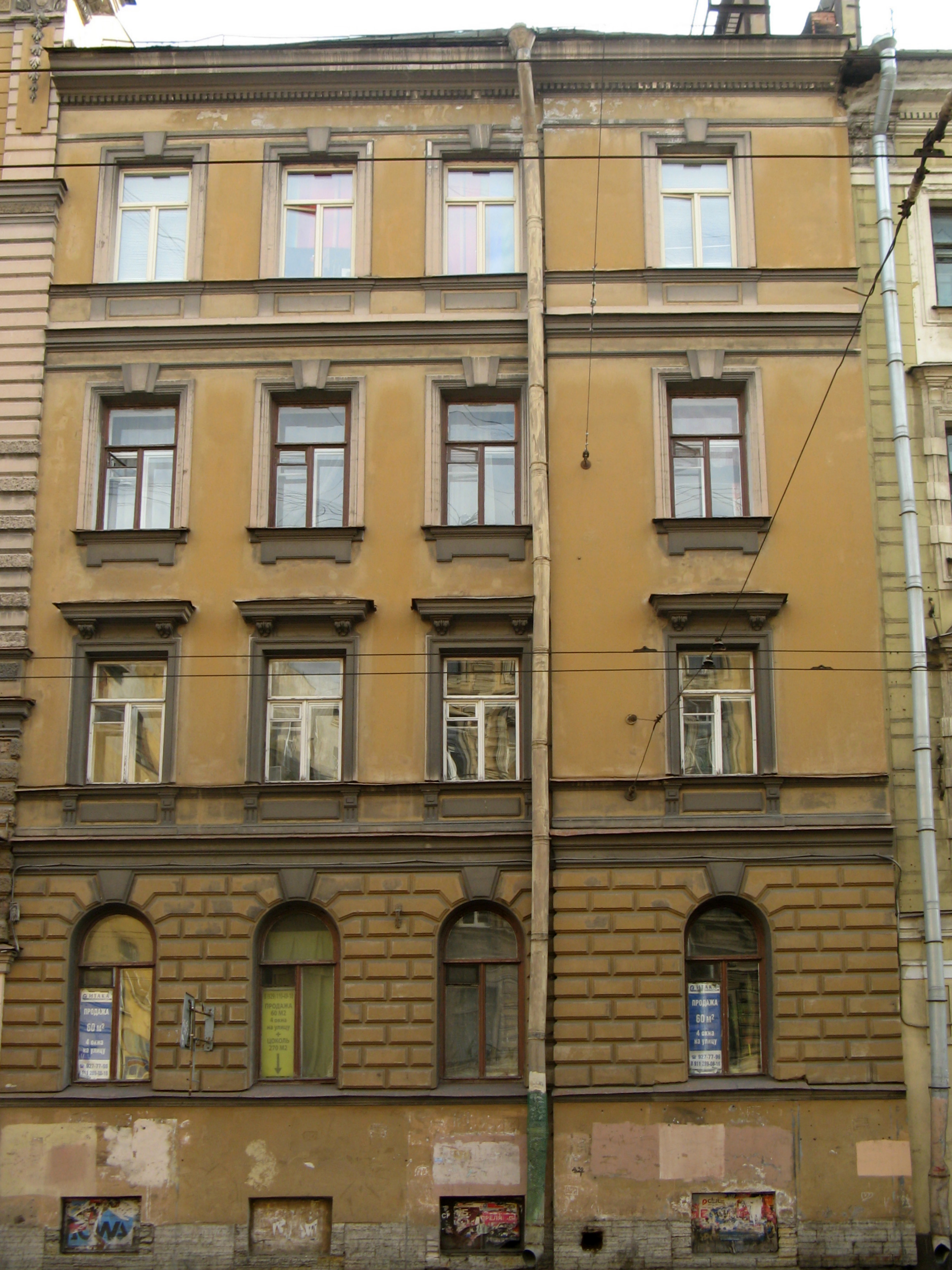
Rimsky-Korsakov Apartment and Museum.

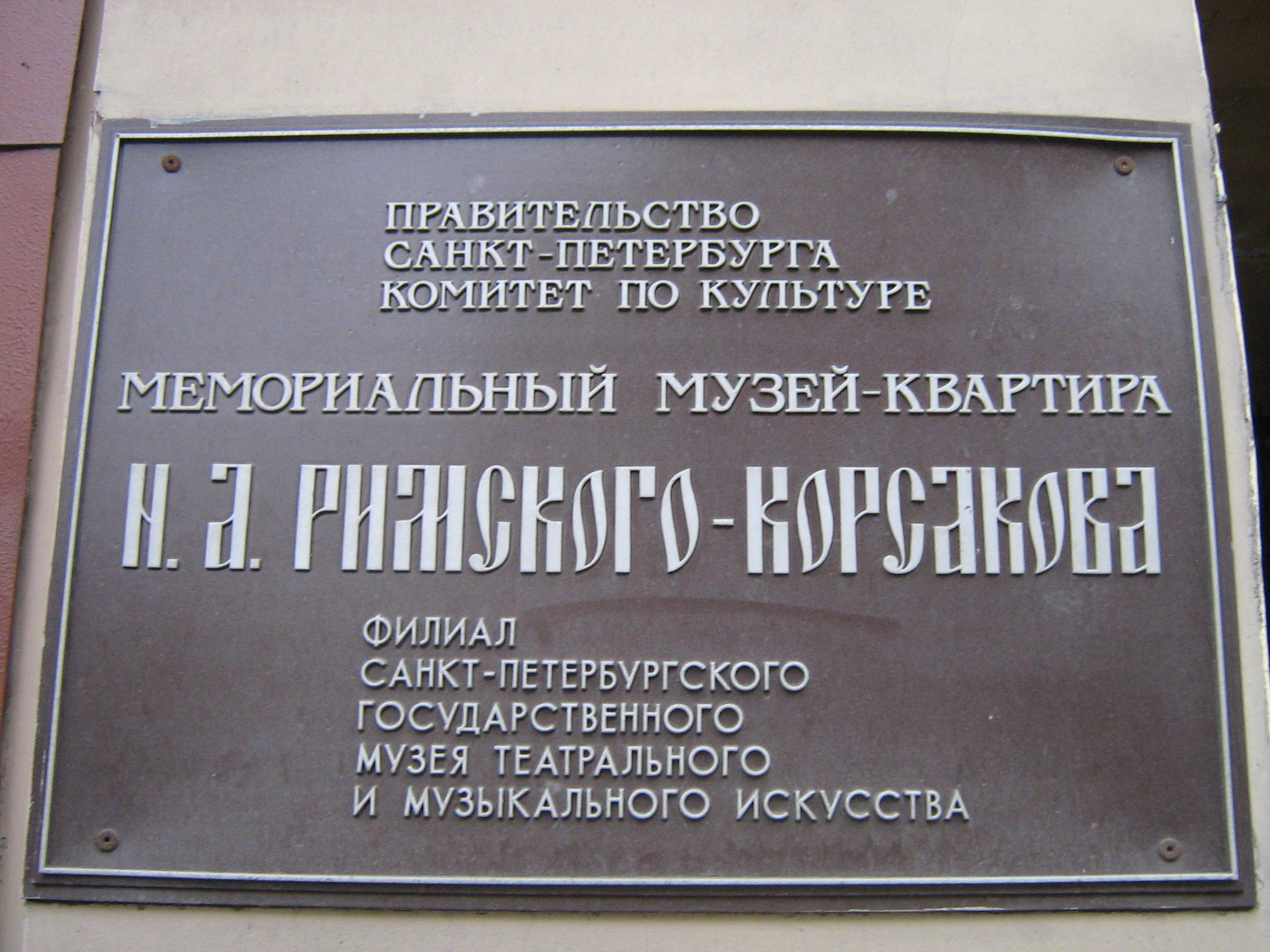
St. Petersburg. Zagorodny prospect (St. Petersburg). Memorial Museum-Apartment of N. A. Rimsky-Korsakov.

The Nikolai Rimsky-Korsakov Memorial Museum-Apartment (Russian: Музей-квартира Н. А. Римского-Корсакова) is a branch of the St. Petersburg State Museum of Theatre and Music.

== History of museum's creation ==
On 27 December 1971 a museum was founded in memory of the composer Nikolai Rimsky-Korsakov in his final St. Petersburg home. The Rimsky-Korsakov family moved to 28 Zagorodny Prospect, St. Petersburg, in the autumn of 1893. This seemingly unremarkable five-storey building is situated in the middle of a yard, surrounded by greenery and set back from the urban bustle. Apartment 39, on the third floor, is where Rimsky-Korsakov lived out his last fifteen years.

After the Russian Revolution in 1917 composer's widow, Nadezhda, was forced to leave the apartment and move in with her son Andrei in the early 1918. For a long time the apartment on Zagorodny Prospect served as a ‘kommunalka’, or a communal apartment, inhabited by ten families, with over twenty people in total. Before she moved out, Nadezhda sorted and catalogued her husband's manuscripts, music library, posters, programmes, photographs, treasured gifts, tributes, and family heirlooms. This large collection later formed the basis of the museum. At the beginning of the 1920s, Rimsky-Korsakov's children transferred the composer's creative output to the Public Library's Manuscript Department. The dream of setting up a museum only became a realistic idea in 1967 when a decision was taken by the state to found an apartment-museum, following the untiring efforts of three generations of Rimsky-Korsakovs for over fifty years. Major repairs were made to the whole building and the apartment was restored. Inside there remained original tiled corner stoves, an elegant marble fireplace, tall folding doors, and window fanlights with bronze handles and bolts. The patterns and colour of the original wallpaper were revealed underneath subsequent layers of wall coverings.

== Collection ==
More than 250 items, carefully preserved by the composer's family, were given to the museum and put back in their original places in the study, hall, drawing room, and dining room. The completeness and authenticity of these rooms make the museum particularly invaluable. The other rooms in the apartment were renovated to create an exhibition room and concert halls in homage to the composer. The materials in the exhibition room give an idea of the diverse activities of Rimsky-Korsakov as a composer, teacher, and conductor. Various documents tell about his work at the Free Music School, Court Capella, and the St. Petersburg Conservatory where he was involved for thirty-seven years. The caliber of the composer's students - Alexander Glazunov, Anatoly Lyadov, Anton Arensky, Alexander Grechaninov, Nikolay Tcherepnin, Nikolay Myaskovsky, Sergei Prokofiev, and Igor Stravinsky - attests to his gift for teaching. The most precious exhibit is the ‘golden pen’, given to the composer in 1880 on the première of his opera May Night. From then on Rimsky-Korsakov used this pen to write all of his compositions, letters, and his journal My Musical Life.

The last period of Rimsky-Korsakov's life was his most creative. During this time he composed eleven of his fifteen operas, including Christmas Eve, Sadko, Mozart and Salieri, The Tsar's Bride, Kaschey the Deathless, The Legend of the Invisible City of Kitezh and the Maiden Fevroniya, The Golden Cockerel, and over 40 romances. The composer's study does not contain a piano: Rimsky-Korsakov usually worked at a writing desk, trusting his unique inner ear. At another desk would sit Nadezhda, faithful assistant in all her husband's musical undertakings, making corrections and piano arrangements of his symphonic and operatic works. In her youth, Nadezhda had herself composed music and was a brilliant pianist.

Musical soirées would take place in the drawing room. By 1905 these had become such regular events as to be known as the "Korsakov Gatherings". Despite there being no forward planning for these evenings, they always proved entertaining. Composers such as Glazunov, Lyadov, Stravinsky, Taneyev, Scriabin, and Rachmaninov gave premières of their own works, and the singers Fyodor Shalyapin, Nadezhda Zabela-Vrubel and Yevgeniya Mravina performed, accompanied by Rimsky-Korsakov's wife. A Becker piano, acquired by Rimsky-Korsakov in 1902, now stands in the drawing room as it did then. The customary "Korsakov Gatherings" still take place to this day, with concertgoers attracted by the warm intimate atmosphere.

Of particular interest in the dining room are the portraits of Rimsky-Korsakov's forebears, painted by unknown artists in the 18th to early 19th centuries. The composer belonged to an ancient noble family descended from Ventseslav Korsak, who came to Russia from Lithuania and whose progeny later russified their surname to ‘Korsakov’. In 1677 Tsar Fyodor Alekseyevich allowed a number of Korsakovs the highest concession of adding the prefix ‘Rimsky’ (meaning ‘Roman’ in Russian) to their surname, on the basis that their ancient forebears had been subjects of the Roman state. Nikolai Rimsky-Korsakov belonged to the fourteenth generation descended from Ventseslav Korsak and was the sixth descendant of the original Rimsky-Korsakov.

The museum's intimate chamber concert hall is popular with both novice musicians and established performers. Thanks to its recently opened new concert hall on the ground floor, the museum now attracts large audiences and has significantly increased its activities.

== Editions ==
- N. A. Rimsky-Korsakov: from the family correspondences. Ed. by V. Fialkovsky, afterword by N. Kostenko. St. Petersburg, Compozitor. 2008. 248 pp.
- Muzei teatra i muzyki v mezhdunarodnom prostranstve: Opyt, traditsii, sotrudnichestvo. St. Petersburg, 2008

== See also ==
- List of music museums
