= Museum of Political History of Russia =

Museum in Saint Petersburg, Russia

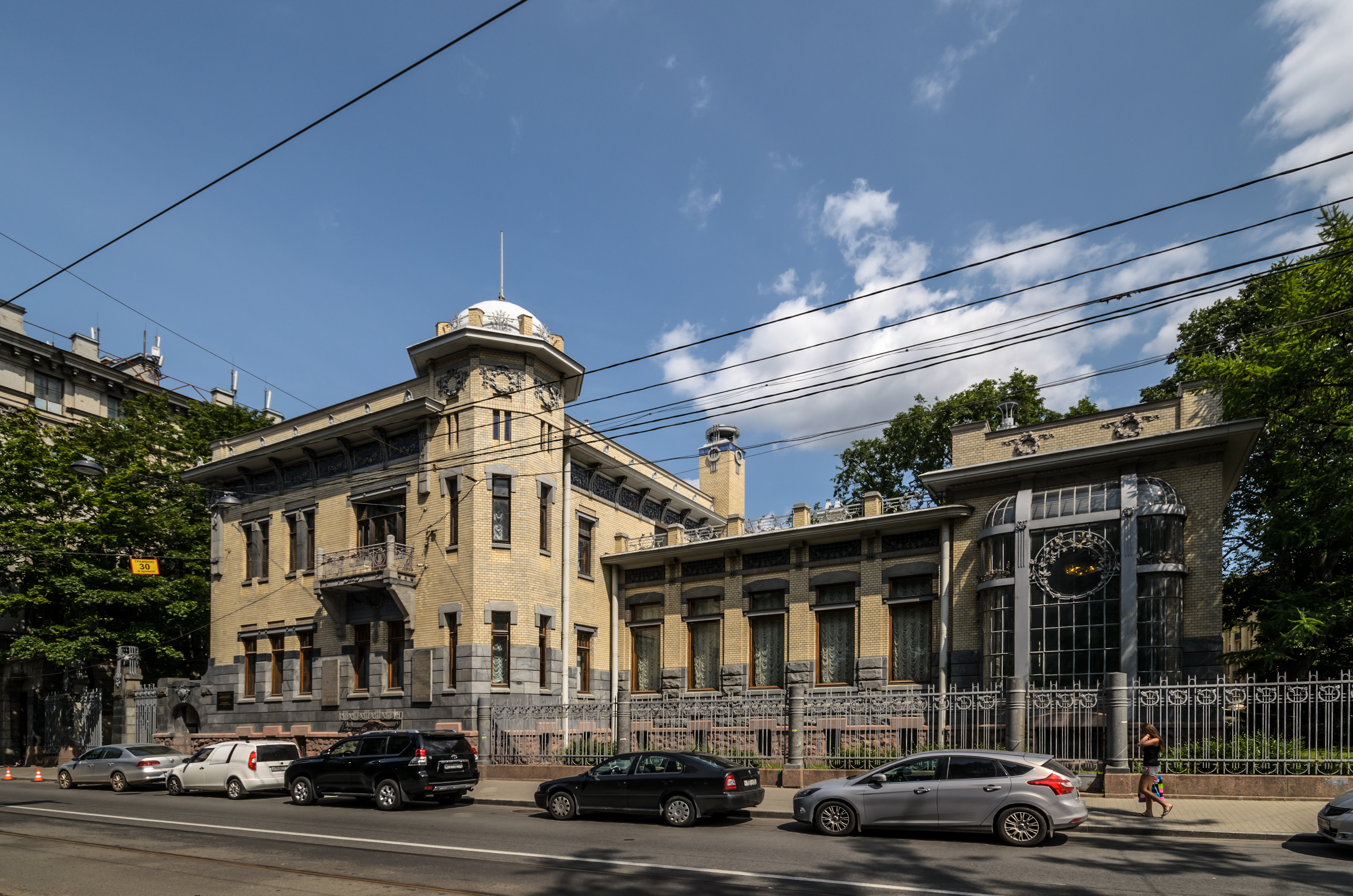
Former mansion of Mathilde Kschessinska, one of the museum's buildings

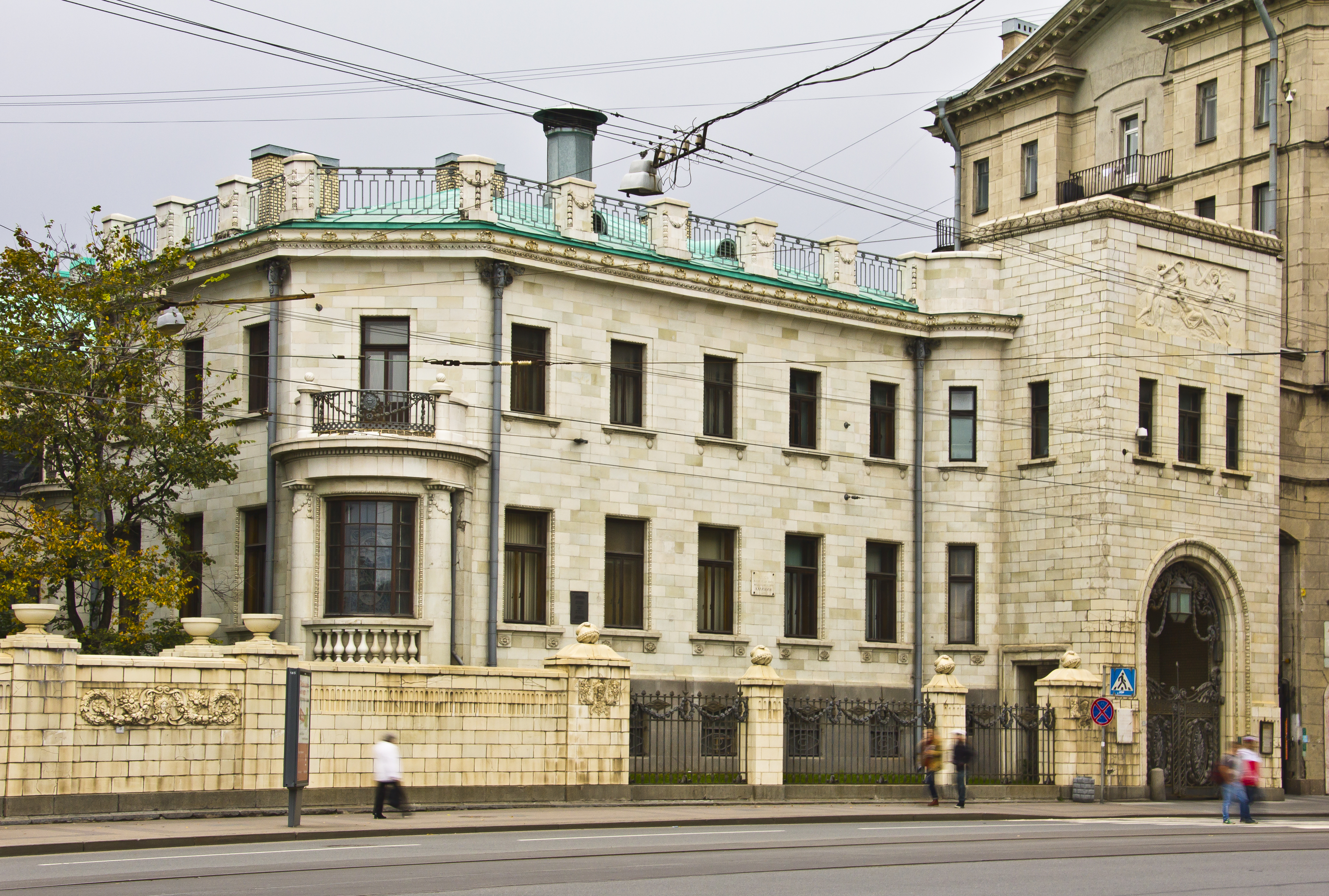
Former mansion of merchant Vassily Emanuilovich Brandt, another museum's building

The State Museum of Political History of Russia (known as the State Museum of Revolution before August 1991) is a political museum located in Saint Petersburg. It archives and showcases the political history of the Russian Federation. Before 1917, one of the buildings belonged to Mathilde Kschessinska.

== Exhibits ==
The museum houses artifacts owned by key figures in the history of Russia, such as the belongings of politicians, statesmen, scientists, and military leaders, among them Sergei Witte, Nicholas II, Vladimir Lenin, Mikhail Gorbachev, and Yuri Gagarin. A calendar of exhibitions is available online.

== See also ==
- List of museums in Saint Petersburg
