= Suvorov Museum =

Museum in Saint Petersburg, Russia

Coordinates: 59.9433°N 30.3765°E

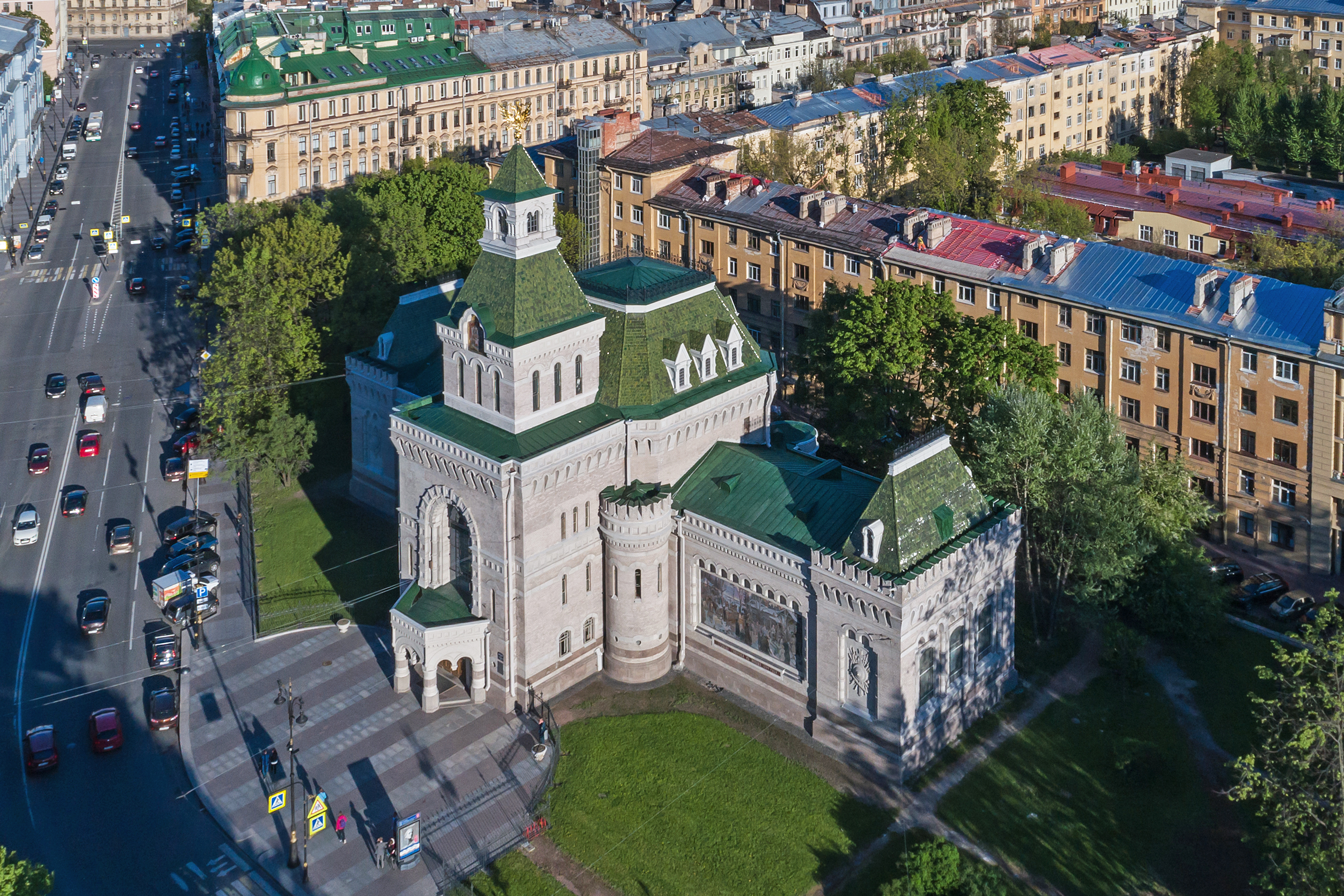
Suvorov Military Museum was scored to resemble a medieval Russian fortress.

Suvorov Memorial Museum (Russian: Музей Суворова) in Saint Petersburg, Russia is a military museum dedicated to the memory of Generalissimo Alexander Suvorov (1729–1800). It was founded in 1900 to commemorate the century of Suvorov's death. In 1904, the museum moved into the present building, purpose-built to a design by Alexander von Hohen in a Russian Revival style.

The museum's collections were acquired through purchase and private donations. The Communist authorities had the museum closed down in 1919 and the collections were dispersed to other museums. In the 1930s, the building housed the AeroMuseum. During the Siege of Leningrad, it was damaged by a bomb.

During World War II the respect of Suvorov was restored in the Soviet military. As a consequence, the museum building was renovated in 1950 and resumed its activity the following year.

== See also ==
- Suvorov Museum, Timanivka, Timanivka, Tulchyn, Vinnitsya, Ukraine
- Suvorov Museum, Ochakiv, Ochakiv, Ukraine
- Suvorov Museum and Reserve, in Konchanskoye-Suvorovckoye, Russia
- Suworow Museum, Linthal, Linthal, Switzerland
- Suvorov Museum, Izmail, Izmail, Ukraine
- Suvorov Military History Museum, Kobrin, Kobrin, Belarus
- List of museums in Saint Petersburg
