= Cabin of Peter the Great =

House in Saint Petersburg, Russia

Coordinates: 59°57′12″N 30°19′51″E

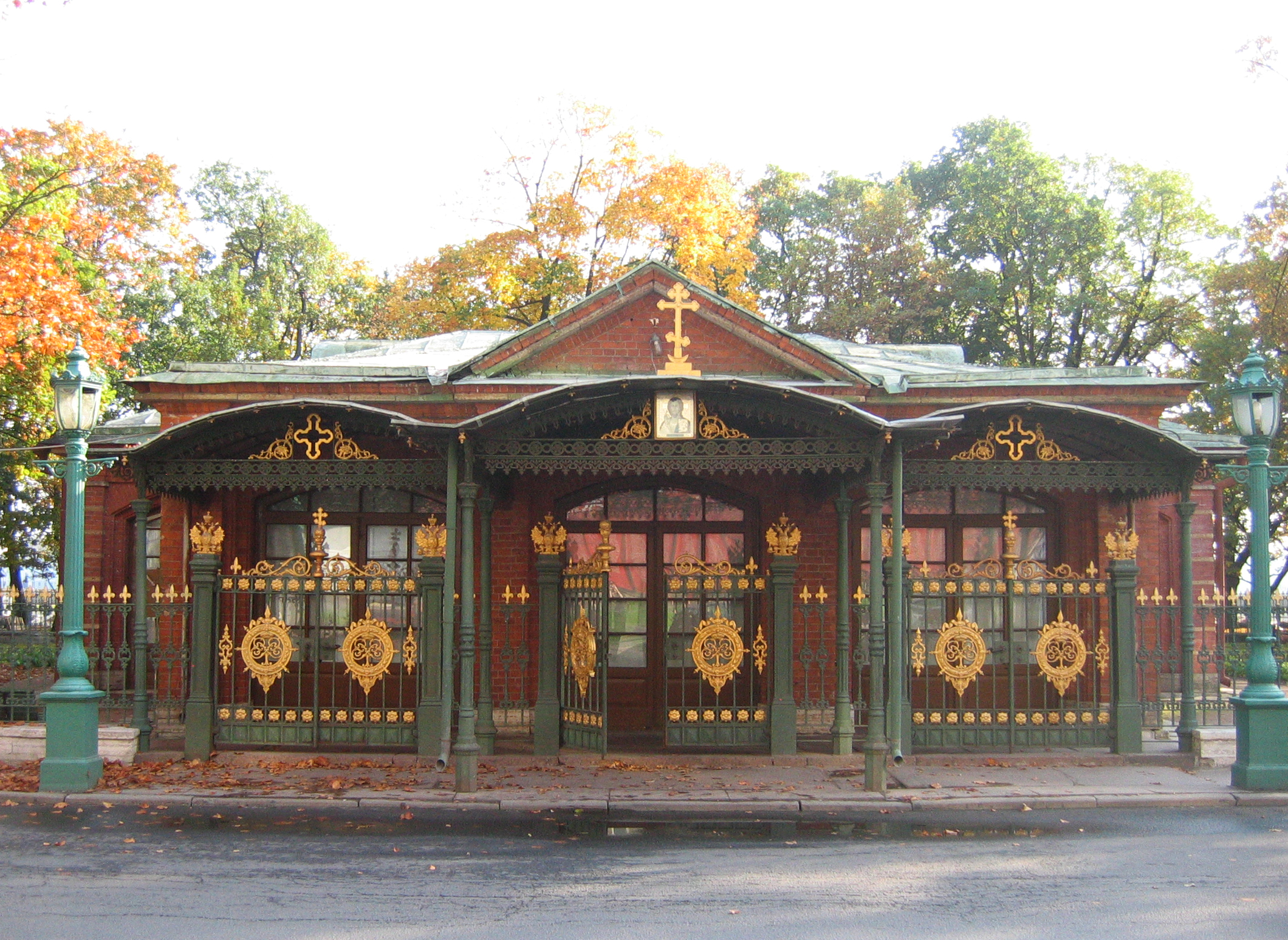
The pavilion housing the Cabin of Peter the Great

The cabin of Peter the Great (Russian: Domik Petra I or Domik Petra Pervogo or Domik Petra Velikogo) is a small wooden house which was the first St Petersburg "palace" of Tsar Peter the Great.

The log cabin was constructed in three days in May 1703, (Note: Explorations in St. Petersburg and Saint Petersburg: Museums, Palaces, and Historic Collections say 1703; Petriva dates it to 1707.) by soldiers of the Semyonovskiy Regiment. At that time, the new St. Petersburg was described as "a heap of villages linked together, like some plantation in the West Indies".

The design is a combination of an izba, a traditional Russian countryside house typical of the 17th century, and the Tsar's beloved Dutch Baroque, later to evolve into the Petrine Baroque. Peter built similar domiki elsewhere in Russia - for example, in Voronezh, and Vologda. The wooden cabin in St. Petersburg covers only 60 square metres (650 ft^{2}) and contains three rooms - living room, bedroom, and study. It has large ornate windows and a high hipped roof of wooden tiles. (Note: Cowles describes Peter the Great "living for years in a small log cabin, composed of three rooms.") Inside, the wooden walls were painted with red oil to resemble brick, and the rooms came to be known as the "red chambers" (krasnyie khoromtsy). (Note: The Companion Guide to St. Petersburg translates this as the "fair mansion".) There are no fires or chimneys, as it was intended to be used only in the warmer summer months. It was occupied by the Tsar between 1703 and 1708, while Peter supervised the construction of the new imperial city and the Peter and Paul Fortress.

Peter had it encased for its protection within a red brick pavilion in 1723, and ordered that it be preserved for posterity as a memorial to his modesty, and the creation of St. Petersburg ex nihilo. Catherine the Great ordered the shelter for the cabin to be renovated in 1784, and the protective brick pavilion was reconstructed by Nicholas I in the 1840s.

Peter's domiki were used to mark significant dates, such as the bicentenary of Peter's birth in 1672. They became a centre of devotion to the tsar, the Russian Orthodox Church, and the Russian motherland (rodina).

A prized national monument, the contents were removed, and the Cabin was boarded up and camouflaged during the Second World War. It was the first St. Petersburg museum to reopen in September 1944, after the end of the Siege of Leningrad. Personal and domestic objects owned and used by Peter are still displayed within, and a bust of Peter by Parmen Zabello stands outside. The cabin is open to the public as a branch of the Russian Museum.

== Gallery ==
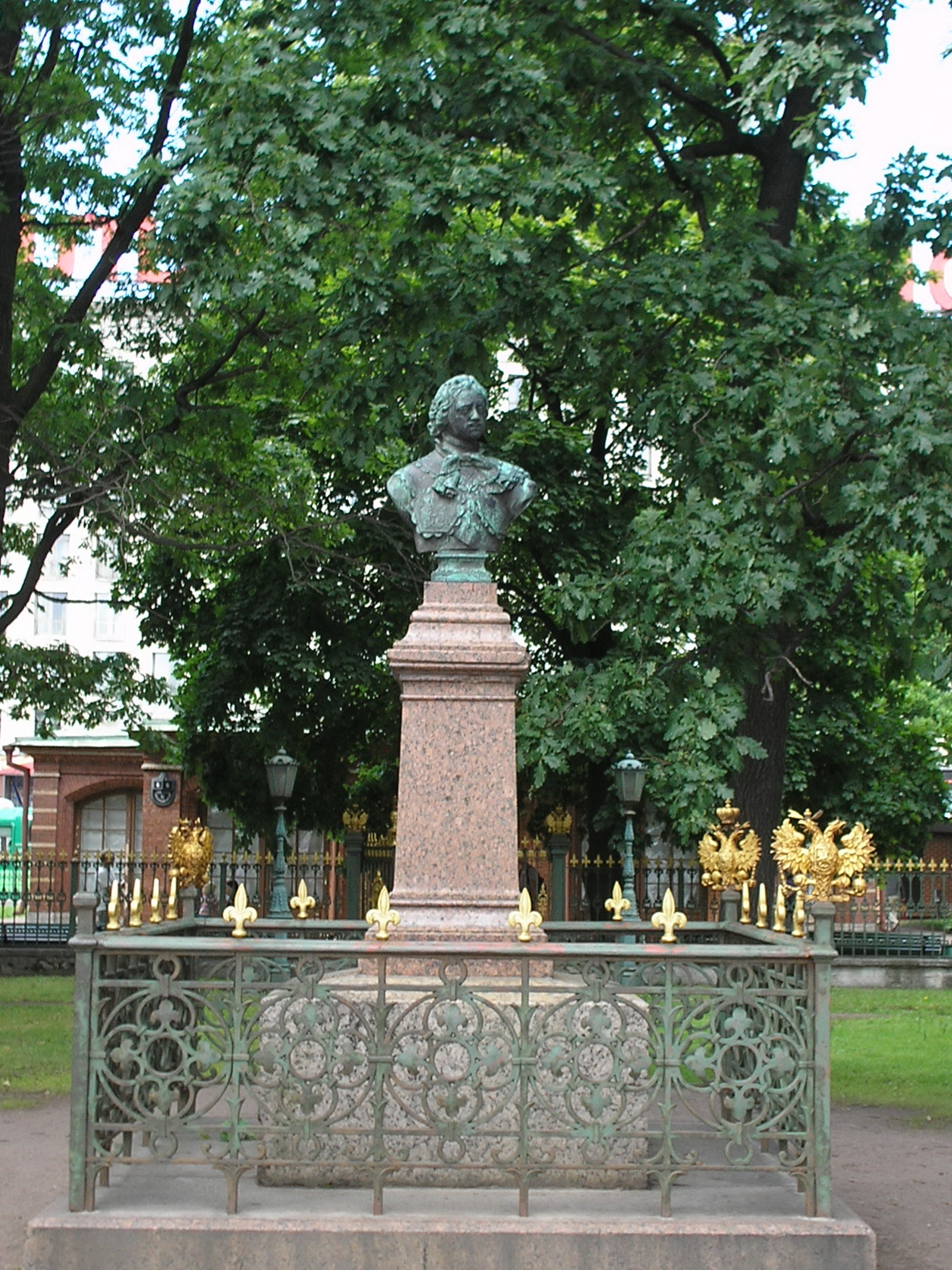
Bust of Peter the Great, in front of his cabin

Cabin of Peter the Great - study

== See also ==
- List of museums in Saint Petersburg
