= Moscow Cat Museum =

- МОСКОВСКИЙ МУЗЕЙ КОШКИ
- Established: March 1993
- Location: Rublyovka, Moscow, Russia
- Coordinates: 55.755826°N 37.6173°E
- Type: Art museum
- Collection size: 1,500
- Founder: Andrei Abramov
- Website: moscow-cat-museum.wixsite.com

Moscow Cat Museum is a museum in Moscow, created in 1993 and dedicated entirely to the theme of cats in art and life.

== History ==
Between May and June 1992, exhibitions organised by Andrei Abramov were held around Moscow, with painters, sculptors, and other artists, with a focus on the feline form. The exhibition program was titled 'Cat's Eye', and this would be a running title for special exhibits at the museum. The program was so successful that it led Andrei creating the Moscow Cat Museum in Moscow, Central Federal District in March 1993. As well as art ranging from batiks to photographs, the museum also includes books, toys, and suits, all centered on the theme of cats. The museum later had to be moved to Rublyovskoye Shosse as the initial sponsors, a pet food company, withdrew their funding.

== Exhibitions ==
The list of main expositions includes Cat's Eye, Women and Cats, Cat's Magic, Children's Pictures of Cats, Cat Around the Map projects. Though the museum contains trinkets such as biscuits and postcards, none of what is displayed is on sale.

The museum is host to the annual 'Woman and Cat' beauty contest. Hosted as part of a wider festival, its main judging criterion is stated as judging "the gracefulness and harmony of the pair, woman and cat". However, extra points are awarded for cat knowledge, and a special challenge is issued for contestants.
