= Plekhanov House =

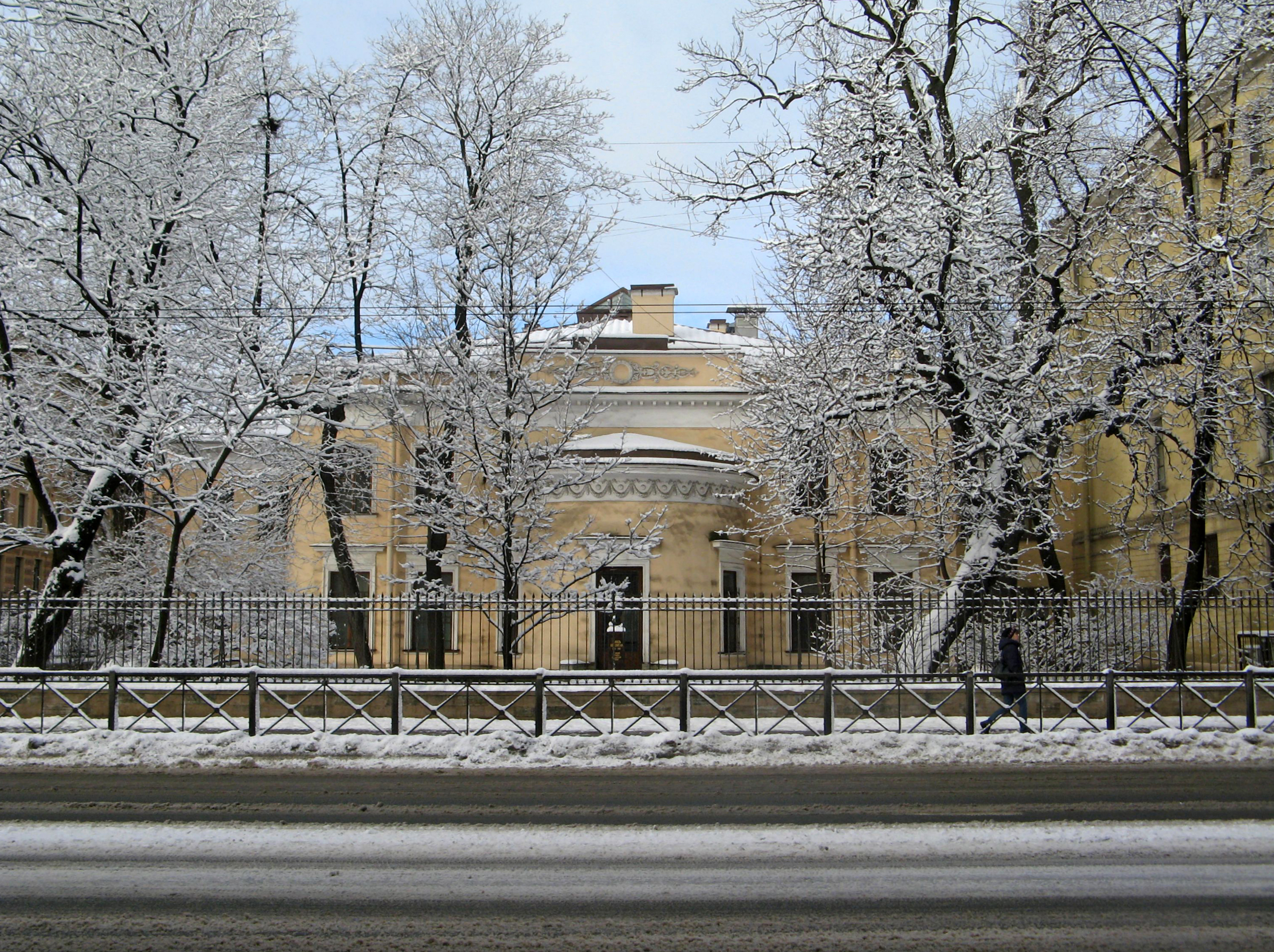
- Interactive map of Plekhanov House
- 59.914100670432546°N 30.317005952170557°E
- Alternative name: Дом Плеханова
- Location: St Petersburg, Russia
- Website: http://nlr.ru/

The Plekhanov House forms part of the Russian National Library in St. Petersburg. It includes 72 archives of materials dating back to 1799. The materials include the archives and library of Georgi Plekhanov, a prominent figure in the Russian political history as a propagandist of Marxism and the founder of Russian social democratic movement. It also included the manuscripts of- and about numerous other figures in Russian history, politics and intellectual life.

Plekhanov House contains a large collection of materials on Russian and foreign history, on the Russian and international revolutionary movements and social history, on education, culture, secular and religious education, and so on. It includes collections of a number of authors from Russian history and from theological sources. The heart of the collection, however, is the over 5,000 items of storage that include original materials from Plekhanov's own collection. Over the years, Plekhanov House has published a number of works including the 24 volumes of Plekhanov's Collected Works, a 5 volume set of Selected Philosophical Works, and other works.

== History ==
After Georgi Plekhanov's death in 1918, the Soviet government, at the initiative of Vladimir Lenin, went to Rosalie Plekhanova with a proposal to start publishing the works of her late husband and set up an Archive. It was only in 1925 that Rosalie Plekhanova agreed to this proposal and presented the thinker's library of works and archive to the Soviet Union after refusing various individuals and research institutions, like Musée Social and Institut des Études Slaves, that offered to acquire or temporary house his collections in Prague or in some West European archive institution.

Plekhanov has resided in Switzerland and Italy from 1880 until 1917 and Finland, where he died in 1918, and parts of his collection, which included authentic manuscripts, extensive correspondence, and voluminous library, were temporarily accommodated by institutions in Geneva and San Remo. It is not clear if his wife's reticence was due to Plekhanov's differences with Lenin and the Bolsheviks. Rosalie Plekhanova maintained that she regarded the archives and library as relics of her husband's work but finally entrusted all his possessions to the state for purposes of the promotion and dissemination of his works. According to Plekhanov House:

Plekhanov had always considered the Petersburg Public Library as his "Alma Mater", a spiritual source of theoretical and practical knowledge he resorted to during the early stages of his scholarly and revolutionary activities. Plekhanov's heirs presented his archives and private library together with the furniture of his study in Geneva to the Soviet Union on the condition of integral hold in the Public Library in Leningrad as an organizational unit in a separate area with specialized research staff.

The opening ceremony of Plekhanov House took place on 11 June 1929, following the donation of the archives and library of Georgi Plekhanov by his widow, Rosalie Plekhanova, to the Soviet Union in 1925.
