= Asit =

ASIT may refer to:

- ASiT - Association of Surgeons in Training
- Allergen-specific immunotherapy
- Aşıt River
