= List of minor planets: 591001–592000 =

The following is a partial list of minor planets, running from minor-planet number 591001 through 592000, inclusive. The primary data for this and other partial lists is based on JPL's "Small-Body Orbital Elements" and data available from the Minor Planet Center. Critical list information is also provided by the MPC, unless otherwise specified from Lowell Observatory. A detailed description of the table's columns and additional sources are given on the main page including a complete list of every page in this series, and a statistical break-up on the dynamical classification of minor planets.

Also see the summary list of all named bodies in numerical and alphabetical order, and the corresponding naming citations for the number range of this particular list. New namings may only be added to this list after official publication, as the preannouncement of names is condemned by the Working Group for Small Bodies Nomenclature of the International Astronomical Union.

Near-Earth obj.	MBA (inner)	MBA (outer)	Centaur
Mars-crosser	MBA (middle)	Jupiter trojan	Trans-Neptunian obj.
Unclassified

== 591001–591100 ==
Designation			Discovery			Properties		Ref
Permanent	Provisional	Named after	Date	Site	Discoverer(s)	Category	Diam.	Ref
591001	2013 AC_{190}	—	January 3, 2013	Mount Lemmon	Mount Lemmon Survey	LUT	3.1 km	MPC; JPL
591002	2013 AD_{190}	—	January 10, 2013	Haleakala	Pan-STARRS 1	·	570 m	MPC; JPL
591003	2013 AT_{197}	—	January 10, 2013	Haleakala	Pan-STARRS 1	·	2.1 km	MPC; JPL
591004	2013 AZ_{197}	—	January 13, 2013	Mount Lemmon	Mount Lemmon Survey	L4 · HEK	8.3 km	MPC; JPL
591005	2013 AB_{198}	—	January 10, 2013	Haleakala	Pan-STARRS 1	EOS	1.2 km	MPC; JPL
591006	2013 AF_{199}	—	January 5, 2013	Mount Lemmon	Mount Lemmon Survey	L4	6.5 km	MPC; JPL
591007	2013 AT_{201}	—	January 14, 2013	Mount Lemmon	Mount Lemmon Survey	L4	8.5 km	MPC; JPL
591008	2013 AV_{201}	—	January 10, 2013	Haleakala	Pan-STARRS 1	L4	8.0 km	MPC; JPL
591009	2013 AB_{204}	—	January 10, 2013	Haleakala	Pan-STARRS 1	·	2.4 km	MPC; JPL
591010	2013 BE	—	December 23, 2012	Haleakala	Pan-STARRS 1	L4	6.3 km	MPC; JPL
591011	2013 BM	—	March 24, 2003	Kitt Peak	Spacewatch	L4	7.5 km	MPC; JPL
591012	2013 BP	—	September 27, 2012	Haleakala	Pan-STARRS 1	L4	7.4 km	MPC; JPL
591013	2013 BN_{3}	—	February 11, 2002	Socorro	LINEAR	L4	9.5 km	MPC; JPL
591014	2013 BK_{4}	—	March 8, 2005	Anderson Mesa	LONEOS	·	1.6 km	MPC; JPL
591015	2013 BR_{7}	—	December 23, 2012	Haleakala	Pan-STARRS 1	L4 · ERY	7.1 km	MPC; JPL
591016	2013 BH_{8}	—	September 27, 2009	Mount Lemmon	Mount Lemmon Survey	L4	6.9 km	MPC; JPL
591017	2013 BH_{11}	—	November 3, 2010	Mount Lemmon	Mount Lemmon Survey	L4	6.6 km	MPC; JPL
591018	2013 BL_{12}	—	January 16, 2013	Haleakala	Pan-STARRS 1	EOS	1.5 km	MPC; JPL
591019	2013 BH_{15}	—	October 13, 2010	Mount Lemmon	Mount Lemmon Survey	L4	6.2 km	MPC; JPL
591020	2013 BS_{16}	—	February 13, 2002	Apache Point	SDSS Collaboration	L4	8.5 km	MPC; JPL
591021	2013 BG_{19}	—	January 16, 2013	Mount Lemmon SkyCe	Kostin, A., T. Vorobjov	·	610 m	MPC; JPL
591022	2013 BC_{20}	—	February 9, 2008	Mount Lemmon	Mount Lemmon Survey	LIX	2.9 km	MPC; JPL
591023	2013 BH_{21}	—	January 6, 2013	Kitt Peak	Spacewatch	L4	7.3 km	MPC; JPL
591024	2013 BV_{26}	—	November 3, 2010	Mount Lemmon	Mount Lemmon Survey	L4	9.3 km	MPC; JPL
591025	2013 BT_{32}	—	January 16, 2013	Haleakala	Pan-STARRS 1	·	560 m	MPC; JPL
591026	2013 BM_{33}	—	January 17, 2013	Kitt Peak	Spacewatch	LIX	2.7 km	MPC; JPL
591027	2013 BB_{34}	—	August 23, 2011	Haleakala	Pan-STARRS 1	·	620 m	MPC; JPL
591028	2013 BG_{34}	—	January 17, 2013	Haleakala	Pan-STARRS 1	L4	7.4 km	MPC; JPL
591029	2013 BP_{34}	—	September 27, 2012	Haleakala	Pan-STARRS 1	L4	7.6 km	MPC; JPL
591030	2013 BU_{36}	—	November 2, 2010	Mount Lemmon	Mount Lemmon Survey	L4	6.3 km	MPC; JPL
591031	2013 BP_{38}	—	December 23, 2012	Haleakala	Pan-STARRS 1	·	3.0 km	MPC; JPL
591032	2013 BS_{38}	—	December 23, 2012	Haleakala	Pan-STARRS 1	L4	7.7 km	MPC; JPL
591033	2013 BR_{42}	—	January 5, 2013	Kitt Peak	Spacewatch	L4	10 km	MPC; JPL
591034	2013 BT_{43}	—	January 6, 2013	Kitt Peak	Spacewatch	L4	8.0 km	MPC; JPL
591035	2013 BC_{44}	—	January 19, 2013	Mount Lemmon	Mount Lemmon Survey	·	2.6 km	MPC; JPL
591036	2013 BK_{44}	—	January 1, 2008	Mount Lemmon	Mount Lemmon Survey	·	1.8 km	MPC; JPL
591037	2013 BO_{44}	—	October 4, 2006	Mount Lemmon	Mount Lemmon Survey	·	2.3 km	MPC; JPL
591038	2013 BT_{52}	—	February 18, 2010	Mount Lemmon	Mount Lemmon Survey	·	490 m	MPC; JPL
591039	2013 BP_{56}	—	February 2, 2008	Mount Lemmon	Mount Lemmon Survey	·	2.1 km	MPC; JPL
591040	2013 BN_{58}	—	January 11, 2008	Mount Lemmon	Mount Lemmon Survey	EOS	1.8 km	MPC; JPL
591041	2013 BD_{60}	—	August 7, 2008	Kitt Peak	Spacewatch	L4	9.0 km	MPC; JPL
591042	2013 BG_{63}	—	January 18, 2013	Kitt Peak	Spacewatch	·	1.3 km	MPC; JPL
591043	2013 BM_{67}	—	December 22, 2012	Haleakala	Pan-STARRS 1	L4	7.0 km	MPC; JPL
591044	2013 BL_{74}	—	December 23, 2012	Haleakala	Pan-STARRS 1	·	1.7 km	MPC; JPL
591045	2013 BN_{74}	—	August 19, 2001	Cerro Tololo	Deep Ecliptic Survey	·	2.0 km	MPC; JPL
591046	2013 BB_{75}	—	January 17, 2013	Haleakala	Pan-STARRS 1	·	520 m	MPC; JPL
591047	2013 BY_{75}	—	January 23, 2006	Kitt Peak	Spacewatch	·	550 m	MPC; JPL
591048	2013 BU_{82}	—	November 3, 2010	Mount Lemmon	Mount Lemmon Survey	L4	7.2 km	MPC; JPL
591049	2013 BU_{90}	—	April 5, 2014	Haleakala	Pan-STARRS 1	·	2.0 km	MPC; JPL
591050	2013 BQ_{91}	—	January 19, 2013	Kitt Peak	Spacewatch	L4	7.6 km	MPC; JPL
591051	2013 BS_{91}	—	January 16, 2013	Haleakala	Pan-STARRS 1	·	2.2 km	MPC; JPL
591052	2013 BN_{92}	—	January 16, 2013	Mount Lemmon	Mount Lemmon Survey	·	1.5 km	MPC; JPL
591053	2013 BM_{93}	—	January 16, 2013	Catalina	CSS	·	2.8 km	MPC; JPL
591054	2013 BM_{95}	—	January 18, 2013	Mount Lemmon	Mount Lemmon Survey	·	2.3 km	MPC; JPL
591055	2013 BZ_{95}	—	January 19, 2013	Kitt Peak	Spacewatch	L4	7.0 km	MPC; JPL
591056	2013 BM_{98}	—	January 9, 2013	Kitt Peak	Spacewatch	L4	6.2 km	MPC; JPL
591057	2013 CX_{1}	—	January 10, 2013	Haleakala	Pan-STARRS 1	EOS	1.7 km	MPC; JPL
591058	2013 CB_{2}	—	January 22, 2013	Mount Lemmon	Mount Lemmon Survey	·	2.1 km	MPC; JPL
591059	2013 CC_{9}	—	January 10, 2013	Kitt Peak	Spacewatch	EOS	1.6 km	MPC; JPL
591060	2013 CS_{10}	—	October 18, 2011	Mount Lemmon	Mount Lemmon Survey	·	760 m	MPC; JPL
591061	2013 CK_{12}	—	November 2, 2011	Mount Lemmon	Mount Lemmon Survey	EOS	1.4 km	MPC; JPL
591062	2013 CX_{14}	—	January 9, 2013	Kitt Peak	Spacewatch	·	1.8 km	MPC; JPL
591063	2013 CO_{20}	—	November 24, 2011	Haleakala	Pan-STARRS 1	L4	7.8 km	MPC; JPL
591064	2013 CY_{23}	—	December 8, 2012	Mount Lemmon	Mount Lemmon Survey	L4	7.7 km	MPC; JPL
591065	2013 CH_{24}	—	November 16, 2006	Catalina	CSS	·	3.1 km	MPC; JPL
591066	2013 CF_{26}	—	February 3, 2013	Haleakala	Pan-STARRS 1	L4	7.4 km	MPC; JPL
591067	2013 CE_{28}	—	January 18, 2013	Mount Lemmon	Mount Lemmon Survey	L4	9.1 km	MPC; JPL
591068	2013 CR_{37}	—	September 12, 2007	Mount Lemmon	Mount Lemmon Survey	·	1.7 km	MPC; JPL
591069	2013 CE_{38}	—	November 7, 2007	Mount Lemmon	Mount Lemmon Survey	·	2.2 km	MPC; JPL
591070	2013 CA_{39}	—	December 6, 2007	Kitt Peak	Spacewatch	·	2.4 km	MPC; JPL
591071	2013 CP_{40}	—	February 2, 2013	Mount Lemmon	Mount Lemmon Survey	L4	7.5 km	MPC; JPL
591072	2013 CY_{42}	—	November 27, 2011	Mount Lemmon	Mount Lemmon Survey	L4	8.4 km	MPC; JPL
591073	2013 CJ_{46}	—	September 18, 2011	Haleakala	Armstrong, J. D.	·	640 m	MPC; JPL
591074	2013 CU_{46}	—	March 23, 2003	Apache Point	SDSS Collaboration	EOS	1.7 km	MPC; JPL
591075	2013 CV_{48}	—	February 3, 1997	Kitt Peak	Spacewatch	·	480 m	MPC; JPL
591076	2013 CW_{57}	—	February 9, 2013	Oukaïmeden	C. Rinner	·	2.5 km	MPC; JPL
591077	2013 CB_{59}	—	February 8, 2002	Kitt Peak	Spacewatch	L4	7.0 km	MPC; JPL
591078	2013 CX_{64}	—	February 8, 2013	Haleakala	Pan-STARRS 1	·	580 m	MPC; JPL
591079	2013 CC_{73}	—	January 7, 2013	Kitt Peak	Spacewatch	·	580 m	MPC; JPL
591080	2013 CZ_{76}	—	September 12, 2005	Kitt Peak	Spacewatch	·	2.4 km	MPC; JPL
591081	2013 CX_{83}	—	February 5, 2013	Kitt Peak	Spacewatch	·	2.4 km	MPC; JPL
591082	2013 CK_{96}	—	August 10, 2007	Kitt Peak	Spacewatch	L4	8.1 km	MPC; JPL
591083	2013 CT_{98}	—	January 17, 2013	Mount Lemmon	Mount Lemmon Survey	·	2.1 km	MPC; JPL
591084	2013 CA_{100}	—	January 17, 2013	Kitt Peak	Spacewatch	·	2.6 km	MPC; JPL
591085	2013 CX_{100}	—	September 6, 2008	Mount Lemmon	Mount Lemmon Survey	L4	7.1 km	MPC; JPL
591086	2013 CM_{104}	—	September 14, 2005	Kitt Peak	Spacewatch	EOS	2.2 km	MPC; JPL
591087	2013 CH_{111}	—	September 25, 2008	Mount Lemmon	Mount Lemmon Survey	L4	9.8 km	MPC; JPL
591088	2013 CD_{112}	—	October 3, 2008	Mount Lemmon	Mount Lemmon Survey	·	660 m	MPC; JPL
591089	2013 CY_{113}	—	February 28, 2008	Mount Lemmon	Mount Lemmon Survey	THM	1.8 km	MPC; JPL
591090	2013 CG_{114}	—	February 10, 2013	Haleakala	Pan-STARRS 1	·	530 m	MPC; JPL
591091	2013 CW_{115}	—	September 4, 2010	Marly	P. Kocher	·	2.9 km	MPC; JPL
591092	2013 CK_{116}	—	November 10, 2004	Kitt Peak	Deep Ecliptic Survey	·	610 m	MPC; JPL
591093	2013 CC_{117}	—	January 26, 2003	Haleakala	NEAT	·	860 m	MPC; JPL
591094	2013 CX_{117}	—	April 1, 2003	Apache Point	SDSS Collaboration	EOS	1.8 km	MPC; JPL
591095	2013 CR_{123}	—	February 12, 2013	ESA OGS	ESA OGS	·	2.6 km	MPC; JPL
591096	2013 CF_{126}	—	February 13, 2013	Haleakala	Pan-STARRS 1	·	1.5 km	MPC; JPL
591097	2013 CT_{126}	—	February 7, 2008	Kitt Peak	Spacewatch	·	2.1 km	MPC; JPL
591098	2013 CW_{126}	—	February 9, 2008	Kitt Peak	Spacewatch	·	1.4 km	MPC; JPL
591099	2013 CV_{130}	—	February 14, 2002	Kitt Peak	Spacewatch	·	2.3 km	MPC; JPL
591100	2013 CO_{132}	—	February 14, 2013	Haleakala	Pan-STARRS 1	·	580 m	MPC; JPL

== 591101–591200 ==
back to top

Designation			Discovery			Properties		Ref
Permanent	Provisional	Named after	Date	Site	Discoverer(s)	Category	Diam.	Ref
591101	2013 CK_{135}	—	September 29, 2009	Mount Lemmon	Mount Lemmon Survey	L4	6.9 km	MPC; JPL
591102	2013 CL_{135}	—	September 2, 2008	Kitt Peak	Spacewatch	L4	7.9 km	MPC; JPL
591103	2013 CK_{137}	—	January 12, 2007	7300	W. K. Y. Yeung	LIX	3.9 km	MPC; JPL
591104	2013 CL_{138}	—	January 17, 2013	Mount Lemmon	Mount Lemmon Survey	·	3.1 km	MPC; JPL
591105	2013 CG_{139}	—	November 8, 2007	Kitt Peak	Spacewatch	·	2.0 km	MPC; JPL
591106	2013 CH_{140}	—	September 19, 2001	Apache Point	SDSS Collaboration	·	2.3 km	MPC; JPL
591107	2013 CJ_{140}	—	January 20, 2013	Kitt Peak	Spacewatch	EOS	1.4 km	MPC; JPL
591108	2013 CZ_{143}	—	February 14, 2013	Mount Lemmon	Mount Lemmon Survey	VER	2.1 km	MPC; JPL
591109	2013 CT_{146}	—	February 14, 2013	Kitt Peak	Spacewatch	·	3.1 km	MPC; JPL
591110	2013 CZ_{146}	—	April 4, 2008	Mount Lemmon	Mount Lemmon Survey	·	2.6 km	MPC; JPL
591111	2013 CJ_{148}	—	February 1, 2013	Kitt Peak	Spacewatch	·	2.5 km	MPC; JPL
591112	2013 CU_{148}	—	September 29, 2005	Mount Lemmon	Mount Lemmon Survey	·	1.9 km	MPC; JPL
591113	2013 CR_{149}	—	February 14, 2013	Kitt Peak	Spacewatch	·	820 m	MPC; JPL
591114	2013 CA_{150}	—	February 28, 2008	Kitt Peak	Spacewatch	EOS	1.7 km	MPC; JPL
591115	2013 CR_{154}	—	September 1, 2010	Mount Lemmon	Mount Lemmon Survey	·	2.2 km	MPC; JPL
591116	2013 CN_{166}	—	March 31, 2008	Kitt Peak	Spacewatch	·	2.2 km	MPC; JPL
591117	2013 CD_{169}	—	March 27, 2008	Mount Lemmon	Mount Lemmon Survey	EOS	1.7 km	MPC; JPL
591118	2013 CE_{170}	—	March 27, 2008	Kitt Peak	Spacewatch	EOS	1.8 km	MPC; JPL
591119	2013 CB_{171}	—	February 15, 2013	Haleakala	Pan-STARRS 1	·	730 m	MPC; JPL
591120	2013 CS_{172}	—	September 10, 2010	Kitt Peak	Spacewatch	·	2.5 km	MPC; JPL
591121	2013 CB_{173}	—	January 31, 2006	Kitt Peak	Spacewatch	·	610 m	MPC; JPL
591122	2013 CW_{177}	—	October 27, 2005	Kitt Peak	Spacewatch	·	530 m	MPC; JPL
591123	2013 CZ_{177}	—	February 8, 2013	Haleakala	Pan-STARRS 1	L4	8.9 km	MPC; JPL
591124	2013 CA_{179}	—	January 9, 2013	Kitt Peak	Spacewatch	LIX	3.0 km	MPC; JPL
591125	2013 CX_{179}	—	April 16, 1996	Haleakala	AMOS	·	3.2 km	MPC; JPL
591126	2013 CU_{181}	—	October 1, 2005	Kitt Peak	Spacewatch	·	3.0 km	MPC; JPL
591127	2013 CY_{181}	—	October 26, 2011	Andrushivka	Y. Ivaščenko, Kyrylenko, P.	·	2.4 km	MPC; JPL
591128	2013 CV_{184}	—	November 7, 2008	Mount Lemmon	Mount Lemmon Survey	·	600 m	MPC; JPL
591129	2013 CS_{186}	—	April 3, 2008	Kitt Peak	Spacewatch	·	2.4 km	MPC; JPL
591130	2013 CL_{192}	—	October 25, 2011	Haleakala	Pan-STARRS 1	·	3.3 km	MPC; JPL
591131	2013 CJ_{194}	—	February 9, 2013	Haleakala	Pan-STARRS 1	L4	7.5 km	MPC; JPL
591132	2013 CY_{195}	—	July 17, 2005	Palomar	NEAT	·	2.2 km	MPC; JPL
591133	2013 CL_{198}	—	February 14, 2013	Kitt Peak	Spacewatch	·	2.0 km	MPC; JPL
591134	2013 CU_{198}	—	April 8, 2010	Kitt Peak	Spacewatch	·	680 m	MPC; JPL
591135	2013 CG_{204}	—	September 16, 2009	Kitt Peak	Spacewatch	L4	7.0 km	MPC; JPL
591136	2013 CH_{204}	—	November 8, 2010	Mount Lemmon	Mount Lemmon Survey	L4	7.2 km	MPC; JPL
591137	2013 CJ_{207}	—	November 17, 2009	Mount Lemmon	Mount Lemmon Survey	L4	6.9 km	MPC; JPL
591138	2013 CK_{207}	—	November 25, 2011	Haleakala	Pan-STARRS 1	L4	7.5 km	MPC; JPL
591139	2013 CN_{208}	—	July 5, 2005	Mount Lemmon	Mount Lemmon Survey	·	1.7 km	MPC; JPL
591140	2013 CW_{209}	—	February 2, 2013	Mount Lemmon	Mount Lemmon Survey	·	490 m	MPC; JPL
591141	2013 CP_{211}	—	September 14, 2007	Mount Lemmon	Mount Lemmon Survey	L4	9.1 km	MPC; JPL
591142	2013 CR_{212}	—	September 21, 2009	Kitt Peak	Spacewatch	L4	6.7 km	MPC; JPL
591143	2013 CO_{213}	—	October 25, 2011	Mount Lemmon	Mount Lemmon Survey	·	620 m	MPC; JPL
591144	2013 CY_{214}	—	February 8, 2013	Haleakala	Pan-STARRS 1	·	2.9 km	MPC; JPL
591145	2013 CK_{215}	—	October 24, 2011	Haleakala	Pan-STARRS 1	·	1.7 km	MPC; JPL
591146	2013 CK_{217}	—	January 17, 2013	Haleakala	Pan-STARRS 1	·	2.0 km	MPC; JPL
591147	2013 CN_{218}	—	February 8, 2013	Haleakala	Pan-STARRS 1	·	2.1 km	MPC; JPL
591148	2013 CP_{220}	—	February 9, 2013	Haleakala	Pan-STARRS 1	VER	2.3 km	MPC; JPL
591149	2013 CH_{223}	—	September 17, 2009	Kitt Peak	Spacewatch	L4	6.2 km	MPC; JPL
591150	2013 CQ_{223}	—	December 14, 2010	Mount Lemmon	Mount Lemmon Survey	L4	5.9 km	MPC; JPL
591151	2013 CR_{223}	—	September 15, 2009	Kitt Peak	Spacewatch	L4 · ERY	6.2 km	MPC; JPL
591152	2013 CE_{227}	—	September 19, 2010	Kitt Peak	Spacewatch	·	2.0 km	MPC; JPL
591153	2013 CH_{229}	—	February 7, 2013	Kitt Peak	Spacewatch	·	2.1 km	MPC; JPL
591154	2013 CO_{229}	—	January 26, 2007	Kitt Peak	Spacewatch	·	2.4 km	MPC; JPL
591155	2013 CT_{229}	—	July 27, 2015	Haleakala	Pan-STARRS 1	·	2.2 km	MPC; JPL
591156	2013 CE_{230}	—	February 5, 2000	Kitt Peak	Spacewatch	·	1.2 km	MPC; JPL
591157	2013 CV_{230}	—	February 15, 2013	Haleakala	Pan-STARRS 1	·	800 m	MPC; JPL
591158	2013 CA_{234}	—	February 13, 2013	Haleakala	Pan-STARRS 1	·	2.2 km	MPC; JPL
591159	2013 CO_{234}	—	December 8, 2015	Mount Lemmon	Mount Lemmon Survey	·	500 m	MPC; JPL
591160	2013 CX_{238}	—	January 26, 2012	Haleakala	Pan-STARRS 1	L4	6.2 km	MPC; JPL
591161	2013 CS_{239}	—	February 14, 2013	Haleakala	Pan-STARRS 1	·	550 m	MPC; JPL
591162	2013 CC_{240}	—	February 9, 2013	Haleakala	Pan-STARRS 1	·	680 m	MPC; JPL
591163	2013 CS_{240}	—	February 13, 2013	Haleakala	Pan-STARRS 1	L4	7.1 km	MPC; JPL
591164	2013 CU_{240}	—	February 6, 2013	Kitt Peak	Spacewatch	·	530 m	MPC; JPL
591165	2013 CV_{240}	—	February 15, 2013	Haleakala	Pan-STARRS 1	·	730 m	MPC; JPL
591166	2013 CA_{241}	—	February 9, 2013	Haleakala	Pan-STARRS 1	·	510 m	MPC; JPL
591167	2013 CG_{241}	—	February 15, 2013	Haleakala	Pan-STARRS 1	·	2.3 km	MPC; JPL
591168	2013 CL_{242}	—	February 9, 2013	Haleakala	Pan-STARRS 1	·	500 m	MPC; JPL
591169	2013 CY_{242}	—	February 11, 2013	Catalina	CSS	·	650 m	MPC; JPL
591170	2013 DY_{3}	—	November 24, 2011	Mount Lemmon	Mount Lemmon Survey	EOS	1.3 km	MPC; JPL
591171	2013 DO_{4}	—	January 9, 2007	Mount Lemmon	Mount Lemmon Survey	·	2.1 km	MPC; JPL
591172	2013 DY_{6}	—	January 9, 2006	Kitt Peak	Spacewatch	·	870 m	MPC; JPL
591173	2013 DK_{10}	—	March 12, 2003	Kitt Peak	Spacewatch	·	2.3 km	MPC; JPL
591174	2013 DZ_{11}	—	February 8, 2013	Haleakala	Pan-STARRS 1	·	2.2 km	MPC; JPL
591175	2013 DK_{13}	—	April 30, 2009	Kitt Peak	Spacewatch	BRA	1.6 km	MPC; JPL
591176	2013 DW_{13}	—	February 17, 2013	Mount Lemmon	Mount Lemmon Survey	·	640 m	MPC; JPL
591177	2013 DC_{18}	—	February 17, 2013	Mount Lemmon	Mount Lemmon Survey	·	2.4 km	MPC; JPL
591178	2013 EW_{1}	—	October 8, 2010	Kitt Peak	Spacewatch	·	1.8 km	MPC; JPL
591179	2013 EU_{9}	—	March 4, 2013	Siding Spring	SSS	AMO	170 m	MPC; JPL
591180	2013 EA_{12}	—	February 14, 2013	Haleakala	Pan-STARRS 1	·	870 m	MPC; JPL
591181	2013 EE_{12}	—	February 7, 2013	Kitt Peak	Spacewatch	·	2.7 km	MPC; JPL
591182	2013 EQ_{13}	—	April 14, 2008	Mount Lemmon	Mount Lemmon Survey	·	2.5 km	MPC; JPL
591183	2013 ET_{13}	—	September 16, 2004	Kitt Peak	Spacewatch	·	3.1 km	MPC; JPL
591184	2013 EG_{17}	—	November 6, 2010	Mount Lemmon	Mount Lemmon Survey	L4	6.3 km	MPC; JPL
591185	2013 EZ_{18}	—	February 14, 2013	Haleakala	Pan-STARRS 1	·	2.2 km	MPC; JPL
591186	2013 EQ_{19}	—	December 4, 2005	Kitt Peak	Spacewatch	·	440 m	MPC; JPL
591187	2013 EK_{22}	—	November 30, 2011	Mount Lemmon	Mount Lemmon Survey	·	2.0 km	MPC; JPL
591188	2013 EJ_{23}	—	August 24, 2008	Kitt Peak	Spacewatch	L4	7.5 km	MPC; JPL
591189	2013 ET_{25}	—	March 7, 2013	Kitt Peak	Spacewatch	·	1.9 km	MPC; JPL
591190	2013 EZ_{26}	—	September 16, 2010	Mount Lemmon	Mount Lemmon Survey	·	2.5 km	MPC; JPL
591191	2013 EV_{29}	—	April 15, 2002	Palomar	NEAT	·	3.2 km	MPC; JPL
591192	2013 ED_{30}	—	January 9, 2013	Kitt Peak	Spacewatch	L4	7.4 km	MPC; JPL
591193	2013 EJ_{31}	—	October 17, 2010	Mayhill-ISON	L. Elenin	·	3.8 km	MPC; JPL
591194	2013 EK_{33}	—	April 13, 2005	Catalina	CSS	·	2.1 km	MPC; JPL
591195	2013 EO_{33}	—	March 15, 2002	Palomar	NEAT	·	3.8 km	MPC; JPL
591196	2013 EV_{38}	—	February 17, 2013	Kitt Peak	Spacewatch	·	2.0 km	MPC; JPL
591197	2013 EU_{41}	—	February 14, 2002	Kitt Peak	Spacewatch	·	2.2 km	MPC; JPL
591198	2013 EN_{43}	—	August 10, 2010	Kitt Peak	Spacewatch	·	1.3 km	MPC; JPL
591199	2013 EN_{45}	—	March 6, 2013	Haleakala	Pan-STARRS 1	·	1.5 km	MPC; JPL
591200	2013 ET_{47}	—	August 28, 2005	Kitt Peak	Spacewatch	EOS	1.8 km	MPC; JPL

== 591201–591300 ==
back to top

Designation			Discovery			Properties		Ref
Permanent	Provisional	Named after	Date	Site	Discoverer(s)	Category	Diam.	Ref
591201 Johnpye	2013 ED_{48}	Johnpye	March 6, 2013	Haleakala	Pan-STARRS 1	·	2.7 km	MPC; JPL
591202	2013 EP_{49}	—	October 9, 2008	Kitt Peak	Spacewatch	·	510 m	MPC; JPL
591203	2013 EH_{56}	—	March 10, 2007	Mount Lemmon	Mount Lemmon Survey	·	1.8 km	MPC; JPL
591204	2013 EW_{64}	—	October 30, 2010	Mount Lemmon	Mount Lemmon Survey	·	2.6 km	MPC; JPL
591205	2013 EQ_{69}	—	February 14, 2013	Haleakala	Pan-STARRS 1	·	1.9 km	MPC; JPL
591206	2013 EJ_{70}	—	September 10, 2010	Mount Lemmon	Mount Lemmon Survey	·	2.4 km	MPC; JPL
591207	2013 ET_{71}	—	March 7, 2013	Mount Lemmon	Mount Lemmon Survey	TIR	2.4 km	MPC; JPL
591208	2013 EL_{73}	—	April 29, 2008	Kitt Peak	Spacewatch	·	2.5 km	MPC; JPL
591209	2013 EF_{76}	—	December 16, 2006	Mount Lemmon	Mount Lemmon Survey	·	2.1 km	MPC; JPL
591210	2013 EK_{81}	—	October 25, 2005	Kitt Peak	Spacewatch	EOS	1.6 km	MPC; JPL
591211	2013 EV_{84}	—	March 20, 2002	Kitt Peak	Spacewatch	·	2.5 km	MPC; JPL
591212	2013 EZ_{84}	—	October 28, 2010	Mount Lemmon	Mount Lemmon Survey	·	2.5 km	MPC; JPL
591213	2013 EN_{87}	—	April 6, 2008	Mount Lemmon	Mount Lemmon Survey	·	3.0 km	MPC; JPL
591214	2013 EF_{89}	—	March 13, 2013	Catalina	CSS	·	420 m	MPC; JPL
591215	2013 EX_{90}	—	October 7, 2005	Mauna Kea	A. Boattini	·	890 m	MPC; JPL
591216	2013 EL_{94}	—	January 9, 2002	Socorro	LINEAR	·	2.1 km	MPC; JPL
591217	2013 EV_{95}	—	October 11, 2010	Mount Lemmon	Mount Lemmon Survey	VER	2.8 km	MPC; JPL
591218	2013 EW_{103}	—	November 28, 2011	Mount Lemmon	Mount Lemmon Survey	·	1.6 km	MPC; JPL
591219	2013 EG_{105}	—	May 5, 2010	Mount Lemmon	Mount Lemmon Survey	·	530 m	MPC; JPL
591220	2013 EV_{105}	—	March 13, 2013	Mount Lemmon	Mount Lemmon Survey	NYS	760 m	MPC; JPL
591221	2013 ER_{112}	—	December 13, 2006	Kitt Peak	Spacewatch	·	2.1 km	MPC; JPL
591222	2013 EY_{115}	—	February 17, 2013	Kitt Peak	Spacewatch	·	3.0 km	MPC; JPL
591223	2013 ER_{124}	—	March 13, 2013	Kitt Peak	Spacewatch	T_{j} (2.94)	3.4 km	MPC; JPL
591224	2013 EW_{125}	—	March 15, 2013	Kitt Peak	Spacewatch	·	510 m	MPC; JPL
591225	2013 EK_{126}	—	November 25, 2005	Mount Lemmon	Mount Lemmon Survey	·	1.9 km	MPC; JPL
591226	2013 EO_{127}	—	February 28, 2008	Kitt Peak	Spacewatch	EOS	1.5 km	MPC; JPL
591227	2013 EZ_{128}	—	August 10, 2010	Kitt Peak	Spacewatch	EUN	980 m	MPC; JPL
591228	2013 ED_{129}	—	March 10, 2008	Kitt Peak	Spacewatch	·	1.9 km	MPC; JPL
591229	2013 EZ_{136}	—	October 9, 2010	Mount Lemmon	Mount Lemmon Survey	L4	6.5 km	MPC; JPL
591230	2013 EV_{139}	—	October 11, 2010	Mount Lemmon	Mount Lemmon Survey	L4	6.7 km	MPC; JPL
591231	2013 ED_{140}	—	January 10, 2013	Haleakala	Pan-STARRS 1	·	420 m	MPC; JPL
591232	2013 EA_{149}	—	March 13, 2013	Kitt Peak	Research and Education Collaborative Occultation Network	·	610 m	MPC; JPL
591233	2013 EN_{152}	—	September 28, 2003	Kitt Peak	Spacewatch	MAS	540 m	MPC; JPL
591234	2013 ED_{159}	—	March 5, 2013	Mount Lemmon	Mount Lemmon Survey	·	2.1 km	MPC; JPL
591235	2013 ES_{159}	—	March 8, 2013	Haleakala	Pan-STARRS 1	·	2.4 km	MPC; JPL
591236	2013 EC_{163}	—	March 14, 2013	Catalina	CSS	·	2.5 km	MPC; JPL
591237	2013 EL_{163}	—	March 5, 2013	Haleakala	Pan-STARRS 1	·	2.3 km	MPC; JPL
591238	2013 EU_{163}	—	March 5, 2013	Mount Lemmon	Mount Lemmon Survey	·	2.6 km	MPC; JPL
591239	2013 EL_{165}	—	October 28, 2016	Haleakala	Pan-STARRS 1	·	1.8 km	MPC; JPL
591240	2013 EZ_{167}	—	March 2, 2009	Mount Lemmon	Mount Lemmon Survey	·	920 m	MPC; JPL
591241	2013 ES_{169}	—	March 13, 2013	Mount Lemmon	Mount Lemmon Survey	·	590 m	MPC; JPL
591242	2013 EL_{170}	—	March 4, 2013	Haleakala	Pan-STARRS 1	LUT	3.2 km	MPC; JPL
591243	2013 EZ_{170}	—	March 5, 2013	Haleakala	Pan-STARRS 1	·	2.4 km	MPC; JPL
591244	2013 EV_{171}	—	October 22, 2011	Mount Lemmon	Mount Lemmon Survey	V	440 m	MPC; JPL
591245	2013 FS_{4}	—	March 11, 2013	Mount Lemmon	Mount Lemmon Survey	·	2.8 km	MPC; JPL
591246	2013 FR_{5}	—	March 31, 2008	Mount Lemmon	Mount Lemmon Survey	·	3.1 km	MPC; JPL
591247	2013 FD_{6}	—	January 25, 2007	Kitt Peak	Spacewatch	·	3.0 km	MPC; JPL
591248	2013 FO_{7}	—	February 8, 2007	Mount Lemmon	Mount Lemmon Survey	T_{j} (2.99)	3.4 km	MPC; JPL
591249	2013 FQ_{9}	—	October 17, 2010	Mount Lemmon	Mount Lemmon Survey	VER	2.5 km	MPC; JPL
591250	2013 FS_{11}	—	November 24, 2011	Haleakala	Pan-STARRS 1	EOS	2.1 km	MPC; JPL
591251	2013 FK_{12}	—	March 19, 2013	Palomar	Palomar Transient Factory	EOS	1.8 km	MPC; JPL
591252	2013 FX_{17}	—	January 31, 2009	Kitt Peak	Spacewatch	·	820 m	MPC; JPL
591253	2013 FU_{20}	—	March 19, 2013	Haleakala	Pan-STARRS 1	·	710 m	MPC; JPL
591254	2013 FH_{21}	—	March 19, 2013	Haleakala	Pan-STARRS 1	·	3.4 km	MPC; JPL
591255	2013 FZ_{22}	—	March 14, 2013	Palomar	Palomar Transient Factory	·	3.3 km	MPC; JPL
591256	2013 FL_{23}	—	February 20, 2006	Kitt Peak	Spacewatch	·	730 m	MPC; JPL
591257	2013 FZ_{23}	—	October 1, 2005	Kitt Peak	Spacewatch	·	2.3 km	MPC; JPL
591258	2013 FG_{24}	—	March 26, 2006	Kitt Peak	Spacewatch	NYS	900 m	MPC; JPL
591259	2013 FZ_{24}	—	March 24, 2006	Mount Lemmon	Mount Lemmon Survey	·	630 m	MPC; JPL
591260	2013 FH_{26}	—	March 23, 2013	Palomar	Palomar Transient Factory	·	800 m	MPC; JPL
591261	2013 FG_{30}	—	March 23, 2013	Mount Lemmon	Mount Lemmon Survey	·	870 m	MPC; JPL
591262	2013 GG_{4}	—	March 12, 2013	Mount Lemmon	Mount Lemmon Survey	·	780 m	MPC; JPL
591263	2013 GU_{10}	—	October 13, 2010	Mount Lemmon	Mount Lemmon Survey	·	2.8 km	MPC; JPL
591264	2013 GD_{11}	—	March 11, 2013	Kitt Peak	Spacewatch	·	2.9 km	MPC; JPL
591265	2013 GE_{13}	—	January 27, 2007	Kitt Peak	Spacewatch	·	2.9 km	MPC; JPL
591266	2013 GP_{13}	—	December 2, 2005	Mauna Kea	A. Boattini	NYS	850 m	MPC; JPL
591267	2013 GR_{13}	—	February 7, 2002	Palomar	NEAT	·	2.1 km	MPC; JPL
591268	2013 GZ_{17}	—	March 14, 2007	Catalina	CSS	·	4.1 km	MPC; JPL
591269	2013 GL_{24}	—	March 13, 2013	Haleakala	Pan-STARRS 1	·	670 m	MPC; JPL
591270	2013 GZ_{26}	—	April 5, 2013	Palomar	Palomar Transient Factory	·	3.3 km	MPC; JPL
591271	2013 GM_{31}	—	October 24, 2011	Haleakala	Pan-STARRS 1	·	710 m	MPC; JPL
591272	2013 GY_{32}	—	September 7, 2004	Kitt Peak	Spacewatch	·	4.4 km	MPC; JPL
591273	2013 GV_{33}	—	March 20, 2007	Mount Lemmon	Mount Lemmon Survey	·	2.7 km	MPC; JPL
591274	2013 GP_{36}	—	March 23, 2007	Moletai	K. Černis, Zdanavicius, J.	·	3.3 km	MPC; JPL
591275	2013 GB_{38}	—	November 11, 2010	Mount Lemmon	Mount Lemmon Survey	·	3.0 km	MPC; JPL
591276	2013 GN_{48}	—	October 3, 2006	Mount Lemmon	Mount Lemmon Survey	·	1.4 km	MPC; JPL
591277	2013 GX_{50}	—	November 4, 2007	Mount Lemmon	Mount Lemmon Survey	MAS	610 m	MPC; JPL
591278	2013 GN_{55}	—	October 27, 2005	Kitt Peak	Spacewatch	·	2.3 km	MPC; JPL
591279	2013 GO_{55}	—	October 14, 2010	Dauban	C. Rinner, Kugel, F.	·	2.9 km	MPC; JPL
591280	2013 GP_{55}	—	February 21, 2007	Kitt Peak	Spacewatch	EOS	1.8 km	MPC; JPL
591281	2013 GC_{56}	—	October 11, 2010	Mount Lemmon	Mount Lemmon Survey	URS	2.8 km	MPC; JPL
591282	2013 GG_{57}	—	October 13, 2010	Catalina	CSS	·	2.9 km	MPC; JPL
591283	2013 GJ_{63}	—	April 2, 2005	Mount Lemmon	Mount Lemmon Survey	·	1.2 km	MPC; JPL
591284	2013 GQ_{64}	—	March 16, 2013	Kitt Peak	Spacewatch	·	600 m	MPC; JPL
591285	2013 GV_{65}	—	April 6, 2013	Mount Lemmon	Mount Lemmon Survey	·	500 m	MPC; JPL
591286	2013 GS_{69}	—	January 31, 2009	Kitt Peak	Spacewatch	·	970 m	MPC; JPL
591287	2013 GL_{72}	—	April 11, 2013	ESA OGS	ESA OGS	·	920 m	MPC; JPL
591288	2013 GU_{75}	—	March 12, 2013	Catalina	CSS	·	2.5 km	MPC; JPL
591289	2013 GO_{78}	—	January 20, 2009	Mount Lemmon	Mount Lemmon Survey	NYS	890 m	MPC; JPL
591290	2013 GE_{83}	—	April 14, 2013	Fort Davis	Ries, J. G.	VER	2.6 km	MPC; JPL
591291	2013 GZ_{84}	—	October 2, 2010	Mount Lemmon	Mount Lemmon Survey	·	3.8 km	MPC; JPL
591292	2013 GV_{86}	—	January 20, 2012	Kitt Peak	Spacewatch	·	3.2 km	MPC; JPL
591293	2013 GO_{95}	—	April 13, 2002	Palomar	NEAT	·	1.5 km	MPC; JPL
591294	2013 GF_{97}	—	January 20, 2009	Kitt Peak	Spacewatch	·	1.0 km	MPC; JPL
591295	2013 GN_{98}	—	April 14, 2007	Gaisberg	Gierlinger, R.	LIX	2.9 km	MPC; JPL
591296	2013 GH_{105}	—	December 29, 2011	Mount Lemmon	Mount Lemmon Survey	VER	3.2 km	MPC; JPL
591297	2013 GY_{106}	—	April 10, 2013	Haleakala	Pan-STARRS 1	·	910 m	MPC; JPL
591298	2013 GK_{108}	—	March 27, 1996	Kitt Peak	Spacewatch	·	870 m	MPC; JPL
591299	2013 GY_{109}	—	March 18, 2013	Kitt Peak	Spacewatch	NYS	840 m	MPC; JPL
591300	2013 GC_{110}	—	March 18, 2013	Kitt Peak	Spacewatch	·	710 m	MPC; JPL

== 591301–591400 ==
back to top

Designation			Discovery			Properties		Ref
Permanent	Provisional	Named after	Date	Site	Discoverer(s)	Category	Diam.	Ref
591301	2013 GB_{117}	—	April 1, 2013	Mount Lemmon	Mount Lemmon Survey	V	600 m	MPC; JPL
591302	2013 GE_{121}	—	October 16, 2010	Charleston	R. Holmes	·	2.9 km	MPC; JPL
591303	2013 GL_{129}	—	September 29, 2011	Mount Lemmon	Mount Lemmon Survey	·	840 m	MPC; JPL
591304	2013 GC_{130}	—	September 29, 2005	Mount Lemmon	Mount Lemmon Survey	T_{j} (2.96)	3.4 km	MPC; JPL
591305	2013 GC_{133}	—	September 12, 2005	Kitt Peak	Spacewatch	·	1.9 km	MPC; JPL
591306	2013 GU_{133}	—	February 27, 2006	Kitt Peak	Spacewatch	·	460 m	MPC; JPL
591307	2013 GC_{135}	—	April 13, 2013	Haleakala	Pan-STARRS 1	·	900 m	MPC; JPL
591308	2013 GD_{141}	—	April 15, 2013	Haleakala	Pan-STARRS 1	·	820 m	MPC; JPL
591309	2013 GF_{142}	—	April 11, 2013	Kitt Peak	Spacewatch	·	1.1 km	MPC; JPL
591310	2013 GF_{143}	—	January 27, 2007	Kitt Peak	Spacewatch	·	2.5 km	MPC; JPL
591311	2013 GG_{143}	—	April 15, 2013	Haleakala	Pan-STARRS 1	·	700 m	MPC; JPL
591312	2013 GP_{145}	—	February 21, 2007	Kitt Peak	Spacewatch	·	1.8 km	MPC; JPL
591313	2013 GC_{151}	—	April 10, 2013	Haleakala	Pan-STARRS 1	MAS	720 m	MPC; JPL
591314	2013 GK_{151}	—	April 13, 2013	Haleakala	Pan-STARRS 1	·	850 m	MPC; JPL
591315	2013 HF_{1}	—	December 25, 2005	Kitt Peak	Spacewatch	·	2.7 km	MPC; JPL
591316	2013 HD_{4}	—	December 22, 2012	Haleakala	Pan-STARRS 1	·	3.0 km	MPC; JPL
591317	2013 HM_{12}	—	July 9, 2010	WISE	WISE	·	1.3 km	MPC; JPL
591318	2013 HS_{13}	—	March 13, 2002	Kitt Peak	Spacewatch	MAS	620 m	MPC; JPL
591319	2013 HR_{16}	—	March 16, 2013	Kitt Peak	Spacewatch	·	1.1 km	MPC; JPL
591320	2013 HX_{17}	—	April 8, 2013	Mount Lemmon	Mount Lemmon Survey	·	580 m	MPC; JPL
591321	2013 HT_{33}	—	April 16, 2013	Cerro Tololo-DECam	DECam	·	530 m	MPC; JPL
591322	2013 HY_{33}	—	September 16, 2009	Mount Lemmon	Mount Lemmon Survey	·	2.5 km	MPC; JPL
591323	2013 HS_{37}	—	April 11, 2013	ESA OGS	ESA OGS	·	590 m	MPC; JPL
591324	2013 HR_{42}	—	February 16, 2001	Nogales	P. R. Holvorcem	·	2.7 km	MPC; JPL
591325	2013 HB_{55}	—	April 9, 2013	Haleakala	Pan-STARRS 1	·	2.8 km	MPC; JPL
591326	2013 HR_{55}	—	March 13, 2013	Kitt Peak	Spacewatch	NYS	500 m	MPC; JPL
591327	2013 HH_{56}	—	February 1, 2012	Mount Lemmon	Mount Lemmon Survey	·	2.2 km	MPC; JPL
591328	2013 HT_{56}	—	April 16, 2013	Cerro Tololo-DECam	DECam	·	590 m	MPC; JPL
591329	2013 HH_{67}	—	March 16, 2007	Mount Lemmon	Mount Lemmon Survey	·	3.0 km	MPC; JPL
591330	2013 HH_{74}	—	March 18, 2007	Kitt Peak	Spacewatch	·	2.1 km	MPC; JPL
591331	2013 HE_{76}	—	April 9, 2013	Haleakala	Pan-STARRS 1	·	2.3 km	MPC; JPL
591332	2013 HL_{82}	—	September 10, 2007	Mount Lemmon	Mount Lemmon Survey	·	750 m	MPC; JPL
591333	2013 HT_{85}	—	March 10, 2002	Kitt Peak	Spacewatch	NYS	610 m	MPC; JPL
591334	2013 HH_{88}	—	March 31, 2008	Modra	Gajdoš, Š.	·	1.4 km	MPC; JPL
591335	2013 HJ_{103}	—	April 16, 2013	Cerro Tololo-DECam	DECam	AGN	700 m	MPC; JPL
591336	2013 HY_{105}	—	October 29, 2011	Mayhill-ISON	L. Elenin	·	640 m	MPC; JPL
591337	2013 HR_{108}	—	October 8, 2004	Kitt Peak	Spacewatch	·	3.0 km	MPC; JPL
591338	2013 HV_{108}	—	October 10, 2004	Kitt Peak	Spacewatch	·	2.4 km	MPC; JPL
591339	2013 HX_{108}	—	September 29, 2003	Kitt Peak	Spacewatch	NYS	730 m	MPC; JPL
591340	2013 HH_{115}	—	December 3, 2008	Mount Lemmon	Mount Lemmon Survey	·	510 m	MPC; JPL
591341	2013 HH_{127}	—	November 3, 2010	Mount Lemmon	Mount Lemmon Survey	·	2.6 km	MPC; JPL
591342	2013 HL_{128}	—	October 11, 2010	Mount Lemmon	Mount Lemmon Survey	·	1.5 km	MPC; JPL
591343	2013 HR_{137}	—	September 10, 2010	Mount Lemmon	Mount Lemmon Survey	·	2.5 km	MPC; JPL
591344	2013 HA_{140}	—	October 4, 2004	Kitt Peak	Spacewatch	·	2.7 km	MPC; JPL
591345	2013 HF_{146}	—	April 9, 2013	Haleakala	Pan-STARRS 1	·	2.3 km	MPC; JPL
591346	2013 JM_{3}	—	October 9, 2005	Kitt Peak	Spacewatch	·	1.8 km	MPC; JPL
591347 Tarczylajos	2013 JC_{7}	Tarczylajos	October 31, 2010	Piszkéstető	S. Kürti, K. Sárneczky	·	3.1 km	MPC; JPL
591348	2013 JQ_{9}	—	September 22, 2003	Kitt Peak	Spacewatch	·	990 m	MPC; JPL
591349	2013 JQ_{18}	—	October 15, 2004	Mount Lemmon	Mount Lemmon Survey	·	3.5 km	MPC; JPL
591350	2013 JG_{28}	—	February 22, 2009	Kitt Peak	Spacewatch	MAS	580 m	MPC; JPL
591351	2013 JH_{39}	—	March 1, 2009	Mount Lemmon	Mount Lemmon Survey	·	850 m	MPC; JPL
591352	2013 JH_{48}	—	October 2, 2010	Nogales	M. Schwartz, P. R. Holvorcem	·	980 m	MPC; JPL
591353	2013 JD_{52}	—	April 17, 2013	Mayhill-ISON	L. Elenin	·	3.7 km	MPC; JPL
591354	2013 JF_{52}	—	April 30, 2006	Kitt Peak	Spacewatch	NYS	880 m	MPC; JPL
591355	2013 JA_{53}	—	September 18, 2003	Kitt Peak	Spacewatch	MAS	700 m	MPC; JPL
591356	2013 JQ_{53}	—	March 14, 2007	Mount Lemmon	Mount Lemmon Survey	·	3.1 km	MPC; JPL
591357	2013 JB_{55}	—	January 29, 2009	Mount Lemmon	Mount Lemmon Survey	·	770 m	MPC; JPL
591358	2013 JY_{65}	—	May 8, 2013	Haleakala	Pan-STARRS 1	·	1.0 km	MPC; JPL
591359	2013 JU_{69}	—	March 15, 2009	Kitt Peak	Spacewatch	NYS	770 m	MPC; JPL
591360	2013 JW_{75}	—	May 3, 2013	Haleakala	Pan-STARRS 1	·	630 m	MPC; JPL
591361	2013 KS_{2}	—	February 21, 2009	Kitt Peak	Spacewatch	·	1.0 km	MPC; JPL
591362	2013 KD_{19}	—	March 11, 2005	Kitt Peak	Spacewatch	·	1.0 km	MPC; JPL
591363	2013 LB_{13}	—	February 1, 2005	Kitt Peak	Spacewatch	·	1.1 km	MPC; JPL
591364	2013 LA_{35}	—	November 17, 2011	Mount Lemmon	Mount Lemmon Survey	PHO	780 m	MPC; JPL
591365	2013 LP_{40}	—	June 30, 2013	Haleakala	Pan-STARRS 1	·	780 m	MPC; JPL
591366	2013 LA_{41}	—	June 15, 2013	Mount Lemmon	Mount Lemmon Survey	PHO	670 m	MPC; JPL
591367	2013 MO_{2}	—	January 16, 2005	Kitt Peak	Spacewatch	·	1.1 km	MPC; JPL
591368	2013 MW_{7}	—	June 7, 2002	Palomar	NEAT	·	1.4 km	MPC; JPL
591369	2013 MW_{13}	—	June 18, 2013	Haleakala	Pan-STARRS 1	·	840 m	MPC; JPL
591370	2013 ME_{14}	—	June 30, 2013	Haleakala	Pan-STARRS 1	centaur	70 km	MPC; JPL
591371	2013 MF_{15}	—	June 18, 2013	Haleakala	Pan-STARRS 1	·	820 m	MPC; JPL
591372	2013 NH_{5}	—	January 21, 2012	Haleakala	Pan-STARRS 1	·	1.1 km	MPC; JPL
591373	2013 NM_{9}	—	December 2, 2010	Mount Lemmon	Mount Lemmon Survey	·	1.2 km	MPC; JPL
591374	2013 ND_{17}	—	February 13, 2008	Mount Lemmon	Mount Lemmon Survey	·	1.1 km	MPC; JPL
591375	2013 NB_{22}	—	July 13, 2013	Haleakala	Pan-STARRS 1	·	1.5 km	MPC; JPL
591376	2013 NL_{24}	—	July 14, 2013	Haleakala	Pan-STARRS 1	centaur	132 km	MPC; JPL
591377	2013 NY_{30}	—	July 14, 2013	Haleakala	Pan-STARRS 1	·	1.1 km	MPC; JPL
591378	2013 NG_{33}	—	July 14, 2013	Haleakala	Pan-STARRS 1	·	1.0 km	MPC; JPL
591379	2013 NC_{41}	—	July 14, 2013	Haleakala	Pan-STARRS 1	·	880 m	MPC; JPL
591380	2013 NA_{49}	—	July 15, 2013	Haleakala	Pan-STARRS 1	·	810 m	MPC; JPL
591381	2013 OB	—	December 26, 2011	Piszkéstető	K. Sárneczky	PHO	2.4 km	MPC; JPL
591382	2013 PQ_{6}	—	August 3, 2013	Haleakala	Pan-STARRS 1	H	390 m	MPC; JPL
591383	2013 PN_{13}	—	August 6, 2013	ESA OGS	ESA OGS	·	1.2 km	MPC; JPL
591384	2013 PK_{29}	—	February 1, 2012	Mount Lemmon	Mount Lemmon Survey	H	420 m	MPC; JPL
591385	2013 PJ_{30}	—	August 8, 2013	Kitt Peak	Spacewatch	NYS	950 m	MPC; JPL
591386	2013 PG_{31}	—	September 19, 1998	Apache Point	SDSS Collaboration	PHO	850 m	MPC; JPL
591387	2013 PC_{32}	—	April 6, 2008	Kitt Peak	Spacewatch	·	790 m	MPC; JPL
591388	2013 PM_{42}	—	January 31, 2012	Mount Lemmon	Mount Lemmon Survey	H	420 m	MPC; JPL
591389	2013 PF_{59}	—	September 26, 2003	Apache Point	SDSS	EOS	1.3 km	MPC; JPL
591390	2013 PK_{63}	—	October 4, 2006	Mount Lemmon	Mount Lemmon Survey	·	1.1 km	MPC; JPL
591391	2013 PC_{81}	—	September 27, 2000	Kitt Peak	Spacewatch	·	1.5 km	MPC; JPL
591392	2013 PE_{84}	—	August 9, 2013	Haleakala	Pan-STARRS 1	cubewano (hot)	228 km	MPC; JPL
591393	2013 PP_{84}	—	August 4, 2013	Haleakala	Pan-STARRS 1	PHO	850 m	MPC; JPL
591394	2013 PE_{98}	—	August 15, 2013	Haleakala	Pan-STARRS 1	·	890 m	MPC; JPL
591395	2013 PY_{102}	—	August 4, 2013	Haleakala	Pan-STARRS 1	MAS	620 m	MPC; JPL
591396 Presser	2013 PR_{103}	Presser	August 5, 2013	Piszkéstető	K. Sárneczky	·	1.1 km	MPC; JPL
591397	2013 PE_{111}	—	August 15, 2013	Haleakala	Pan-STARRS 1	·	760 m	MPC; JPL
591398	2013 PG_{115}	—	August 9, 2013	Kitt Peak	Spacewatch	HOF	1.8 km	MPC; JPL
591399	2013 QV_{3}	—	September 13, 2002	Palomar	NEAT	·	1.3 km	MPC; JPL
591400	2013 QF_{6}	—	August 17, 2013	Haleakala	Pan-STARRS 1	H	340 m	MPC; JPL

== 591401–591500 ==
back to top

Designation			Discovery			Properties		Ref
Permanent	Provisional	Named after	Date	Site	Discoverer(s)	Category	Diam.	Ref
591401	2013 QA_{22}	—	September 27, 2008	Mount Lemmon	Mount Lemmon Survey	·	2.5 km	MPC; JPL
591402	2013 QF_{23}	—	August 26, 2013	Haleakala	Pan-STARRS 1	PHO	700 m	MPC; JPL
591403	2013 QV_{27}	—	August 28, 2013	Mount Lemmon	Mount Lemmon Survey	PHO	650 m	MPC; JPL
591404	2013 QY_{32}	—	August 30, 2013	Haleakala	Pan-STARRS 1	H	490 m	MPC; JPL
591405	2013 QZ_{34}	—	June 17, 2013	Mount Lemmon	Mount Lemmon Survey	·	1.2 km	MPC; JPL
591406	2013 QD_{35}	—	February 10, 2011	Mount Lemmon	Mount Lemmon Survey	NYS	990 m	MPC; JPL
591407	2013 QX_{36}	—	September 27, 2008	Mount Lemmon	Mount Lemmon Survey	·	2.3 km	MPC; JPL
591408	2013 QK_{60}	—	August 26, 2013	Haleakala	Pan-STARRS 1	·	1.3 km	MPC; JPL
591409	2013 QO_{64}	—	May 9, 2006	Mount Lemmon	Mount Lemmon Survey	·	690 m	MPC; JPL
591410	2013 QN_{72}	—	January 11, 2008	Mount Lemmon	Mount Lemmon Survey	PHO	740 m	MPC; JPL
591411	2013 QV_{75}	—	August 16, 2009	Kitt Peak	Spacewatch	·	810 m	MPC; JPL
591412	2013 QP_{76}	—	August 17, 2013	Haleakala	Pan-STARRS 1	V	500 m	MPC; JPL
591413	2013 QP_{82}	—	August 7, 2013	ESA OGS	ESA OGS	·	1.2 km	MPC; JPL
591414	2013 QW_{84}	—	August 8, 2013	Kitt Peak	Spacewatch	·	1.1 km	MPC; JPL
591415	2013 QT_{92}	—	August 5, 2013	ESA OGS	ESA OGS	PHO	930 m	MPC; JPL
591416	2013 QR_{94}	—	December 13, 2006	Mount Lemmon	Mount Lemmon Survey	NYS	790 m	MPC; JPL
591417	2013 QK_{96}	—	August 31, 2013	Črni Vrh	Skvarč, J.	·	1.3 km	MPC; JPL
591418	2013 QS_{97}	—	January 19, 2015	Catalina	CSS	·	1.3 km	MPC; JPL
591419	2013 QJ_{98}	—	December 21, 2014	Haleakala	Pan-STARRS 1	·	1.1 km	MPC; JPL
591420	2013 RA_{8}	—	January 14, 2011	Tzec Maun	E. Schwab	·	1.4 km	MPC; JPL
591421	2013 RU_{8}	—	January 3, 2011	Tzec Maun	E. Schwab	·	1.2 km	MPC; JPL
591422	2013 RR_{12}	—	October 27, 2009	Kitt Peak	Spacewatch	·	1.5 km	MPC; JPL
591423	2013 RW_{14}	—	February 28, 2008	Kitt Peak	Spacewatch	MAS	930 m	MPC; JPL
591424	2013 RQ_{16}	—	September 27, 2009	Mount Lemmon	Mount Lemmon Survey	·	1.1 km	MPC; JPL
591425	2013 RK_{19}	—	August 1, 2009	Kitt Peak	Spacewatch	·	1.4 km	MPC; JPL
591426 Adalawson	2013 RP_{21}	Adalawson	September 2, 2013	iTelescope	Falla, N.	H	370 m	MPC; JPL
591427	2013 RM_{24}	—	November 10, 2006	Kitt Peak	Spacewatch	·	1.7 km	MPC; JPL
591428	2013 RZ_{28}	—	September 4, 2013	Mount Lemmon	Mount Lemmon Survey	H	440 m	MPC; JPL
591429	2013 RL_{33}	—	September 5, 2013	Catalina	CSS	·	1.1 km	MPC; JPL
591430	2013 RW_{34}	—	January 19, 2004	Socorro	LINEAR	PHO	1.6 km	MPC; JPL
591431	2013 RP_{44}	—	July 5, 2005	Kitt Peak	Spacewatch	·	1.6 km	MPC; JPL
591432	2013 RV_{62}	—	September 1, 2013	Mount Lemmon	Mount Lemmon Survey	·	1.1 km	MPC; JPL
591433	2013 RT_{72}	—	February 26, 2012	Haleakala	Pan-STARRS 1	H	470 m	MPC; JPL
591434	2013 RY_{98}	—	September 3, 2013	Calar Alto	F. Hormuth	L5	6.9 km	MPC; JPL
591435	2013 RX_{100}	—	August 20, 2009	Kitt Peak	Spacewatch	·	740 m	MPC; JPL
591436	2013 RQ_{108}	—	September 9, 2013	Haleakala	Pan-STARRS 1	MAS	680 m	MPC; JPL
591437	2013 RN_{110}	—	September 13, 2013	Mount Lemmon	Mount Lemmon Survey	·	1.1 km	MPC; JPL
591438	2013 RT_{113}	—	September 6, 2013	Kitt Peak	Spacewatch	H	500 m	MPC; JPL
591439	2013 RK_{143}	—	September 13, 2013	Mount Lemmon	Mount Lemmon Survey	KOR	1.1 km	MPC; JPL
591440	2013 SK	—	June 19, 2010	Catalina	CSS	H	480 m	MPC; JPL
591441	2013 SW_{1}	—	September 18, 2009	Kitt Peak	Spacewatch	·	770 m	MPC; JPL
591442	2013 SU_{5}	—	August 20, 2009	Kitt Peak	Spacewatch	·	1.1 km	MPC; JPL
591443	2013 SK_{25}	—	September 27, 2013	Oukaïmeden	C. Rinner	HNS	1.3 km	MPC; JPL
591444	2013 SA_{53}	—	September 28, 2001	Palomar	NEAT	·	1.2 km	MPC; JPL
591445	2013 SO_{53}	—	February 21, 2006	Mount Lemmon	Mount Lemmon Survey	·	1.3 km	MPC; JPL
591446	2013 SZ_{53}	—	April 12, 2011	Mount Lemmon	Mount Lemmon Survey	(5)	930 m	MPC; JPL
591447	2013 SQ_{55}	—	September 25, 2005	Kitt Peak	Spacewatch	H	460 m	MPC; JPL
591448	2013 SV_{62}	—	November 16, 2006	Lulin	LUSS	·	1.5 km	MPC; JPL
591449	2013 SU_{66}	—	August 5, 2005	Palomar	NEAT	·	1.1 km	MPC; JPL
591450	2013 SP_{70}	—	September 10, 2013	Haleakala	Pan-STARRS 1	·	1.4 km	MPC; JPL
591451	2013 SS_{72}	—	September 1, 2013	Mount Lemmon	Mount Lemmon Survey	·	850 m	MPC; JPL
591452	2013 SL_{75}	—	September 25, 2013	Mount Lemmon	Mount Lemmon Survey	3:2 · SHU	5.3 km	MPC; JPL
591453	2013 SM_{76}	—	September 14, 2013	Haleakala	Pan-STARRS 1	PHO	870 m	MPC; JPL
591454	2013 SJ_{94}	—	February 27, 2015	Haleakala	Pan-STARRS 1	·	690 m	MPC; JPL
591455	2013 SY_{97}	—	February 24, 2017	Haleakala	Pan-STARRS 1	·	2.9 km	MPC; JPL
591456	2013 SE_{98}	—	September 10, 2013	Haleakala	Pan-STARRS 1	·	850 m	MPC; JPL
591457	2013 TK_{12}	—	September 5, 2013	Mayhill-ISON	L. Elenin	PHO	1.0 km	MPC; JPL
591458	2013 TR_{21}	—	October 1, 2013	Mount Lemmon	Mount Lemmon Survey	·	760 m	MPC; JPL
591459	2013 TM_{34}	—	March 6, 2002	Palomar	NEAT	·	1.5 km	MPC; JPL
591460	2013 TR_{34}	—	August 26, 2005	Palomar	NEAT	·	1.7 km	MPC; JPL
591461	2013 TO_{54}	—	October 4, 2013	Mount Lemmon	Mount Lemmon Survey	·	1.2 km	MPC; JPL
591462	2013 TR_{63}	—	April 27, 2012	Haleakala	Pan-STARRS 1	·	1.3 km	MPC; JPL
591463	2013 TD_{65}	—	September 18, 2009	Kitt Peak	Spacewatch	·	820 m	MPC; JPL
591464	2013 TG_{75}	—	April 1, 2003	Palomar	NEAT	(194)	1.5 km	MPC; JPL
591465	2013 TG_{76}	—	November 9, 2009	Mount Lemmon	Mount Lemmon Survey	·	860 m	MPC; JPL
591466	2013 TG_{81}	—	October 11, 2005	Kitt Peak	Spacewatch	·	890 m	MPC; JPL
591467	2013 TL_{82}	—	October 1, 2013	Mount Lemmon	Mount Lemmon Survey	·	1.0 km	MPC; JPL
591468	2013 TB_{83}	—	July 4, 2005	Palomar	NEAT	·	1.1 km	MPC; JPL
591469	2013 TG_{106}	—	September 30, 2005	Mount Lemmon	Mount Lemmon Survey	·	690 m	MPC; JPL
591470	2013 TU_{116}	—	September 30, 2005	Kitt Peak	Spacewatch	T_{j} (2.99) · 3:2	4.3 km	MPC; JPL
591471	2013 TX_{132}	—	November 5, 2005	Catalina	CSS	·	970 m	MPC; JPL
591472	2013 TR_{155}	—	December 29, 2005	Mount Lemmon	Mount Lemmon Survey	·	1.3 km	MPC; JPL
591473	2013 TQ_{159}	—	October 24, 2009	Kitt Peak	Spacewatch	·	920 m	MPC; JPL
591474	2013 TT_{164}	—	October 7, 2013	Kitt Peak	Spacewatch	·	1.0 km	MPC; JPL
591475	2013 TF_{165}	—	October 16, 2009	Mount Lemmon	Mount Lemmon Survey	·	930 m	MPC; JPL
591476	2013 TN_{166}	—	August 10, 2007	Kitt Peak	Spacewatch	THM	2.1 km	MPC; JPL
591477	2013 TJ_{168}	—	October 3, 2013	Haleakala	Pan-STARRS 1	AGN	1.0 km	MPC; JPL
591478	2013 TW_{170}	—	November 9, 2009	Kitt Peak	Spacewatch	·	1 km	MPC; JPL
591479	2013 TB_{171}	—	October 14, 2009	Bergisch Gladbach	W. Bickel	MAR	970 m	MPC; JPL
591480	2013 TN_{171}	—	February 26, 2011	Kitt Peak	Spacewatch	·	1.6 km	MPC; JPL
591481	2013 TT_{171}	—	October 9, 2013	Kitt Peak	Spacewatch	(5)	920 m	MPC; JPL
591482	2013 TR_{172}	—	October 6, 2013	Kitt Peak	Spacewatch	·	1.5 km	MPC; JPL
591483	2013 TO_{173}	—	October 3, 2013	Haleakala	Pan-STARRS 1	EUN	810 m	MPC; JPL
591484	2013 TM_{175}	—	October 3, 2013	Kitt Peak	Spacewatch	·	1.2 km	MPC; JPL
591485	2013 TP_{176}	—	October 5, 2013	Mayhill-ISON	L. Elenin	PHO	660 m	MPC; JPL
591486	2013 TA_{188}	—	October 1, 2014	Cerro Tololo-DECam	Bernardinelli, P. H., Bernstein, G., Sako, M.	plutino	102 km	MPC; JPL
591487	2013 TH_{201}	—	October 3, 2013	Haleakala	Pan-STARRS 1	·	1.3 km	MPC; JPL
591488	2013 UD_{3}	—	December 31, 2008	Kitt Peak	Spacewatch	·	450 m	MPC; JPL
591489	2013 UE_{10}	—	October 30, 2013	Elena Remote	Oreshko, A.	·	1.6 km	MPC; JPL
591490	2013 UT_{13}	—	October 24, 2005	Kitt Peak	Spacewatch	H	400 m	MPC; JPL
591491	2013 UZ_{18}	—	November 17, 2009	Mount Lemmon	Mount Lemmon Survey	·	880 m	MPC; JPL
591492	2013 UC_{19}	—	October 16, 2013	Mount Lemmon	Mount Lemmon Survey	HNS	1.0 km	MPC; JPL
591493	2013 UF_{19}	—	October 26, 2013	Mount Lemmon	Mount Lemmon Survey	·	1.1 km	MPC; JPL
591494	2013 UZ_{21}	—	October 30, 2013	Kitt Peak	Spacewatch	·	1.3 km	MPC; JPL
591495	2013 UF_{22}	—	October 23, 2013	Haleakala	Pan-STARRS 1	·	900 m	MPC; JPL
591496	2013 UP_{23}	—	October 25, 2013	Mount Lemmon	Mount Lemmon Survey	·	1.0 km	MPC; JPL
591497	2013 UU_{24}	—	October 28, 2013	Mount Lemmon	Mount Lemmon Survey	HNS	770 m	MPC; JPL
591498	2013 UF_{33}	—	October 26, 2013	Mount Lemmon	Mount Lemmon Survey	HNS	1.0 km	MPC; JPL
591499	2013 UA_{34}	—	October 25, 2013	Mount Lemmon	Mount Lemmon Survey	·	1.1 km	MPC; JPL
591500	2013 UP_{39}	—	October 28, 2013	Catalina	CSS	EUN	1.0 km	MPC; JPL

== 591501–591600 ==
back to top

Designation			Discovery			Properties		Ref
Permanent	Provisional	Named after	Date	Site	Discoverer(s)	Category	Diam.	Ref
591501	2013 UR_{39}	—	October 24, 2013	Mount Lemmon	Mount Lemmon Survey	·	830 m	MPC; JPL
591502	2013 UF_{42}	—	October 28, 2013	Mount Lemmon	Mount Lemmon Survey	·	1.1 km	MPC; JPL
591503	2013 VP_{9}	—	May 14, 2012	Haleakala	Pan-STARRS 1	H	480 m	MPC; JPL
591504	2013 VQ_{9}	—	November 7, 2013	Kitt Peak	Spacewatch	H	530 m	MPC; JPL
591505	2013 VZ_{14}	—	October 12, 2013	Kitt Peak	Spacewatch	HNS	860 m	MPC; JPL
591506	2013 VE_{21}	—	April 1, 2003	Kitt Peak	Deep Ecliptic Survey	HNS	1.1 km	MPC; JPL
591507	2013 VQ_{28}	—	September 4, 2008	Kitt Peak	Spacewatch	·	1.4 km	MPC; JPL
591508	2013 VB_{29}	—	February 27, 2006	Catalina	CSS	·	1.6 km	MPC; JPL
591509	2013 VZ_{30}	—	November 11, 2009	Kitt Peak	Spacewatch	·	780 m	MPC; JPL
591510	2013 VN_{32}	—	March 27, 1995	Kitt Peak	Spacewatch	·	1.4 km	MPC; JPL
591511	2013 VU_{32}	—	November 2, 2013	Mount Lemmon	Mount Lemmon Survey	·	920 m	MPC; JPL
591512	2013 VP_{33}	—	November 2, 2013	Mount Lemmon	Mount Lemmon Survey	·	1.2 km	MPC; JPL
591513	2013 VF_{34}	—	January 22, 2015	Haleakala	Pan-STARRS 1	·	860 m	MPC; JPL
591514	2013 VO_{42}	—	January 20, 2015	Haleakala	Pan-STARRS 1	·	1 km	MPC; JPL
591515	2013 VE_{43}	—	November 12, 2013	Mount Lemmon	Mount Lemmon Survey	·	1.2 km	MPC; JPL
591516	2013 VV_{43}	—	November 4, 2013	Mount Lemmon	Mount Lemmon Survey	·	1.0 km	MPC; JPL
591517	2013 VC_{50}	—	November 9, 2013	Haleakala	Pan-STARRS 1	·	1.3 km	MPC; JPL
591518	2013 VQ_{53}	—	November 8, 2013	Mount Lemmon	Mount Lemmon Survey	·	1.2 km	MPC; JPL
591519	2013 VA_{58}	—	November 9, 2013	Haleakala	Pan-STARRS 1	·	1.1 km	MPC; JPL
591520	2013 VV_{61}	—	November 23, 2009	Kitt Peak	Spacewatch	(5)	930 m	MPC; JPL
591521	2013 WT_{1}	—	November 25, 2013	Nogales	M. Schwartz, P. R. Holvorcem	·	1.2 km	MPC; JPL
591522	2013 WT_{4}	—	December 1, 2005	Kitt Peak	Spacewatch	(5)	1.2 km	MPC; JPL
591523	2013 WD_{12}	—	May 13, 2011	Haleakala	Pan-STARRS 1	MAR	1.2 km	MPC; JPL
591524	2013 WY_{23}	—	September 28, 2000	Kitt Peak	Spacewatch	·	1.4 km	MPC; JPL
591525	2013 WX_{27}	—	December 8, 2005	Kitt Peak	Spacewatch	·	830 m	MPC; JPL
591526	2013 WN_{29}	—	December 24, 2005	Kitt Peak	Spacewatch	·	1.4 km	MPC; JPL
591527	2013 WK_{37}	—	November 27, 2013	Haleakala	Pan-STARRS 1	·	1.5 km	MPC; JPL
591528	2013 WJ_{38}	—	November 28, 2013	Kitt Peak	Spacewatch	·	1.1 km	MPC; JPL
591529	2013 WU_{41}	—	November 28, 2013	Mount Lemmon	Mount Lemmon Survey	·	1.2 km	MPC; JPL
591530	2013 WP_{42}	—	November 13, 2002	Palomar	NEAT	MAS	770 m	MPC; JPL
591531	2013 WD_{46}	—	March 13, 2011	Kitt Peak	Spacewatch	·	2.0 km	MPC; JPL
591532	2013 WG_{57}	—	June 17, 2004	Kitt Peak	Spacewatch	H	600 m	MPC; JPL
591533	2013 WS_{62}	—	January 22, 2002	Kitt Peak	Spacewatch	·	1.2 km	MPC; JPL
591534	2013 WU_{65}	—	January 27, 2006	Kitt Peak	Spacewatch	·	1.4 km	MPC; JPL
591535	2013 WD_{67}	—	October 15, 2004	Mount Lemmon	Mount Lemmon Survey	JUN	1.3 km	MPC; JPL
591536	2013 WL_{67}	—	November 29, 2013	Haleakala	Pan-STARRS 1	H	350 m	MPC; JPL
591537	2013 WD_{71}	—	October 8, 2004	Kitt Peak	Spacewatch	·	1.2 km	MPC; JPL
591538	2013 WJ_{73}	—	November 19, 2009	Kitt Peak	Spacewatch	·	2.2 km	MPC; JPL
591539	2013 WJ_{74}	—	November 26, 2013	Haleakala	Pan-STARRS 1	·	1.1 km	MPC; JPL
591540	2013 WY_{77}	—	November 9, 2009	Mount Lemmon	Mount Lemmon Survey	·	1.5 km	MPC; JPL
591541	2013 WU_{84}	—	August 7, 2004	Palomar	NEAT	·	1.3 km	MPC; JPL
591542	2013 WV_{84}	—	November 10, 2009	Kitt Peak	Spacewatch	·	930 m	MPC; JPL
591543	2013 WE_{86}	—	April 4, 2002	Palomar	NEAT	·	1.4 km	MPC; JPL
591544	2013 WR_{87}	—	December 19, 2001	Palomar	NEAT	·	1.7 km	MPC; JPL
591545	2013 WW_{94}	—	November 8, 2013	Kitt Peak	Spacewatch	·	1.4 km	MPC; JPL
591546	2013 WZ_{96}	—	November 2, 2013	Mount Lemmon	Mount Lemmon Survey	·	1.3 km	MPC; JPL
591547	2013 WB_{102}	—	May 12, 2012	Haleakala	Pan-STARRS 1	(5)	1.1 km	MPC; JPL
591548	2013 WL_{103}	—	November 18, 2009	Kitt Peak	Spacewatch	(5)	1.2 km	MPC; JPL
591549	2013 WB_{105}	—	May 15, 2012	Mount Lemmon	Mount Lemmon Survey	H	380 m	MPC; JPL
591550	2013 WH_{105}	—	August 20, 2003	Palomar	NEAT	EUN	1.8 km	MPC; JPL
591551	2013 WO_{109}	—	May 12, 2007	Mount Lemmon	Mount Lemmon Survey	MAR	970 m	MPC; JPL
591552	2013 WH_{114}	—	November 28, 2013	Mount Lemmon	Mount Lemmon Survey	·	1.2 km	MPC; JPL
591553	2013 WK_{114}	—	December 29, 2014	Haleakala	Pan-STARRS 1	MAR	1.1 km	MPC; JPL
591554	2013 WM_{114}	—	November 28, 2013	Catalina	CSS	·	940 m	MPC; JPL
591555	2013 WJ_{115}	—	November 12, 2013	Mount Lemmon	Mount Lemmon Survey	·	1.1 km	MPC; JPL
591556	2013 WV_{117}	—	November 28, 2013	Mount Lemmon	Mount Lemmon Survey	·	1.6 km	MPC; JPL
591557	2013 WT_{118}	—	May 3, 2016	Haleakala	Pan-STARRS 1	ADE	1.4 km	MPC; JPL
591558	2013 WZ_{121}	—	November 26, 2013	Mount Lemmon	Mount Lemmon Survey	·	1.1 km	MPC; JPL
591559	2013 WW_{129}	—	November 28, 2013	Mount Lemmon	Mount Lemmon Survey	·	1.3 km	MPC; JPL
591560	2013 XQ	—	October 2, 2000	Kitt Peak	Spacewatch	·	1.4 km	MPC; JPL
591561	2013 XN_{1}	—	December 3, 2013	Haleakala	Pan-STARRS 1	·	1.2 km	MPC; JPL
591562	2013 XT_{2}	—	June 8, 2012	Mount Lemmon	Mount Lemmon Survey	H	600 m	MPC; JPL
591563	2013 XH_{11}	—	November 11, 2013	Mount Lemmon	Mount Lemmon Survey	EUN	1.3 km	MPC; JPL
591564	2013 XM_{11}	—	November 27, 2013	Mayhill-ISON	L. Elenin	·	1.6 km	MPC; JPL
591565	2013 XJ_{19}	—	November 6, 2013	Nogales	M. Schwartz, P. R. Holvorcem	·	1.4 km	MPC; JPL
591566	2013 XX_{24}	—	November 29, 2013	Palomar	Palomar Transient Factory	H	520 m	MPC; JPL
591567	2013 XC_{27}	—	February 17, 2010	Mount Lemmon	Mount Lemmon Survey	·	990 m	MPC; JPL
591568	2013 XJ_{28}	—	October 29, 2008	Mount Lemmon	Mount Lemmon Survey	AGN	1.1 km	MPC; JPL
591569	2013 XQ_{28}	—	November 29, 2013	Kitt Peak	Spacewatch	EUN	1.1 km	MPC; JPL
591570	2013 XV_{28}	—	December 3, 2013	Mount Lemmon	Mount Lemmon Survey	·	1.3 km	MPC; JPL
591571	2013 XJ_{32}	—	August 4, 2017	Haleakala	Pan-STARRS 1	·	1.2 km	MPC; JPL
591572	2013 YJ_{3}	—	April 22, 2007	Mount Bigelow	CSS	·	1.9 km	MPC; JPL
591573	2013 YT_{5}	—	December 13, 2013	Mount Lemmon	Mount Lemmon Survey	·	1.3 km	MPC; JPL
591574	2013 YY_{5}	—	November 3, 2008	Mount Lemmon	Mount Lemmon Survey	DOR	2.1 km	MPC; JPL
591575	2013 YV_{9}	—	February 17, 2010	Mount Lemmon	Mount Lemmon Survey	·	1.1 km	MPC; JPL
591576	2013 YK_{10}	—	December 9, 2013	XuYi	PMO NEO Survey Program	BAR	1.3 km	MPC; JPL
591577	2013 YL_{14}	—	October 7, 2004	Socorro	LINEAR	·	1.3 km	MPC; JPL
591578	2013 YN_{15}	—	December 24, 2013	Mount Lemmon	Mount Lemmon Survey	·	1.0 km	MPC; JPL
591579	2013 YP_{16}	—	February 23, 2007	Mount Lemmon	Mount Lemmon Survey	·	670 m	MPC; JPL
591580	2013 YY_{16}	—	August 20, 2000	Kitt Peak	Spacewatch	·	1.1 km	MPC; JPL
591581	2013 YS_{17}	—	September 7, 2008	Catalina	CSS	·	1.6 km	MPC; JPL
591582	2013 YY_{18}	—	February 10, 2010	Kitt Peak	Spacewatch	·	1.2 km	MPC; JPL
591583	2013 YZ_{18}	—	January 31, 2009	Kitt Peak	Spacewatch	·	2.2 km	MPC; JPL
591584	2013 YB_{26}	—	September 25, 2009	Kitt Peak	Spacewatch	MAS	660 m	MPC; JPL
591585	2013 YW_{28}	—	June 16, 2012	Haleakala	Pan-STARRS 1	·	1.3 km	MPC; JPL
591586	2013 YH_{29}	—	December 24, 2013	Nogales	Gajdoš, Š.	·	1.7 km	MPC; JPL
591587	2013 YB_{31}	—	January 6, 2006	Mount Lemmon	Mount Lemmon Survey	(5)	1.0 km	MPC; JPL
591588	2013 YD_{32}	—	December 25, 2013	Mount Lemmon	Mount Lemmon Survey	·	1.5 km	MPC; JPL
591589	2013 YY_{40}	—	March 8, 2003	Socorro	LINEAR	NYS	1.3 km	MPC; JPL
591590	2013 YJ_{42}	—	December 9, 2004	Kitt Peak	Spacewatch	·	2.0 km	MPC; JPL
591591	2013 YN_{44}	—	July 31, 2000	Cerro Tololo	Deep Ecliptic Survey	·	1.1 km	MPC; JPL
591592 Carlanderson	2013 YX_{44}	Carlanderson	December 3, 2013	Oukaïmeden	M. Ory	·	1.7 km	MPC; JPL
591593	2013 YU_{45}	—	February 18, 2010	Mount Lemmon	Mount Lemmon Survey	·	1.2 km	MPC; JPL
591594	2013 YY_{48}	—	December 24, 2013	Mount Lemmon	Mount Lemmon Survey	·	2.1 km	MPC; JPL
591595	2013 YH_{50}	—	September 23, 2008	Mount Lemmon	Mount Lemmon Survey	·	1.6 km	MPC; JPL
591596	2013 YT_{51}	—	September 18, 2003	Palomar	NEAT	·	2.3 km	MPC; JPL
591597	2013 YD_{54}	—	December 10, 2013	Mount Lemmon	Mount Lemmon Survey	·	980 m	MPC; JPL
591598	2013 YV_{54}	—	December 25, 2005	Kitt Peak	Spacewatch	·	1.2 km	MPC; JPL
591599	2013 YV_{59}	—	December 4, 2013	Haleakala	Pan-STARRS 1	JUN	880 m	MPC; JPL
591600	2013 YC_{65}	—	December 28, 2013	Kitt Peak	Spacewatch	·	1.6 km	MPC; JPL

== 591601–591700 ==
back to top

Designation			Discovery			Properties		Ref
Permanent	Provisional	Named after	Date	Site	Discoverer(s)	Category	Diam.	Ref
591601	2013 YF_{65}	—	November 30, 2008	Mount Lemmon	Mount Lemmon Survey	AGN	920 m	MPC; JPL
591602	2013 YS_{65}	—	March 3, 2005	Catalina	CSS	·	2.7 km	MPC; JPL
591603	2013 YN_{68}	—	January 19, 2004	Kitt Peak	Spacewatch	·	1.7 km	MPC; JPL
591604	2013 YW_{71}	—	December 10, 2013	Mount Lemmon	Mount Lemmon Survey	·	1.7 km	MPC; JPL
591605	2013 YH_{73}	—	August 14, 2012	Haleakala	Pan-STARRS 1	·	1.8 km	MPC; JPL
591606	2013 YN_{77}	—	October 22, 2008	Kitt Peak	Spacewatch	WIT	860 m	MPC; JPL
591607	2013 YE_{78}	—	November 6, 2008	Kitt Peak	Spacewatch	·	1.5 km	MPC; JPL
591608	2013 YT_{80}	—	November 8, 2008	Kitt Peak	Spacewatch	·	1.5 km	MPC; JPL
591609	2013 YC_{81}	—	October 22, 2008	Kitt Peak	Spacewatch	·	1.5 km	MPC; JPL
591610	2013 YT_{81}	—	December 28, 2013	Kitt Peak	Spacewatch	EUN	1.0 km	MPC; JPL
591611	2013 YF_{89}	—	December 28, 2013	Kitt Peak	Spacewatch	·	1.9 km	MPC; JPL
591612	2013 YP_{91}	—	October 9, 2004	Kitt Peak	Spacewatch	·	1.5 km	MPC; JPL
591613	2013 YO_{95}	—	January 16, 2005	Kitt Peak	Spacewatch	·	1.3 km	MPC; JPL
591614	2013 YP_{97}	—	December 11, 2013	Mount Lemmon	Mount Lemmon Survey	·	1.8 km	MPC; JPL
591615	2013 YA_{98}	—	May 13, 2002	Palomar	NEAT	MAR	1.6 km	MPC; JPL
591616	2013 YK_{98}	—	December 10, 2013	Mount Lemmon	Mount Lemmon Survey	EUN	950 m	MPC; JPL
591617	2013 YK_{101}	—	September 3, 2008	La Sagra	OAM	·	1.2 km	MPC; JPL
591618	2013 YS_{104}	—	December 28, 2013	Mount Lemmon	Mount Lemmon Survey	·	1.4 km	MPC; JPL
591619	2013 YZ_{105}	—	December 30, 2013	Haleakala	Pan-STARRS 1	·	1.7 km	MPC; JPL
591620	2013 YF_{106}	—	November 29, 2013	Kitt Peak	Spacewatch	·	1.6 km	MPC; JPL
591621	2013 YO_{111}	—	December 29, 2013	Haleakala	Pan-STARRS 1	EUN	1.1 km	MPC; JPL
591622	2013 YG_{112}	—	March 13, 2010	Mount Lemmon	Mount Lemmon Survey	·	1.3 km	MPC; JPL
591623	2013 YK_{114}	—	September 9, 2012	Bergisch Gladbach	W. Bickel	·	1.7 km	MPC; JPL
591624	2013 YT_{114}	—	February 6, 1997	Kitt Peak	Spacewatch	·	1.4 km	MPC; JPL
591625	2013 YF_{116}	—	July 22, 2011	Haleakala	Pan-STARRS 1	·	2.6 km	MPC; JPL
591626	2013 YH_{118}	—	December 7, 2013	Kitt Peak	Spacewatch	EUN	940 m	MPC; JPL
591627	2013 YK_{120}	—	December 26, 2013	Mount Lemmon	Mount Lemmon Survey	·	1.0 km	MPC; JPL
591628	2013 YM_{120}	—	December 30, 2013	Haleakala	Pan-STARRS 1	·	1.5 km	MPC; JPL
591629	2013 YG_{122}	—	December 30, 2013	Haleakala	Pan-STARRS 1	·	1.1 km	MPC; JPL
591630	2013 YF_{124}	—	November 28, 2013	Mount Lemmon	Mount Lemmon Survey	·	1.1 km	MPC; JPL
591631	2013 YL_{125}	—	October 20, 2003	Kitt Peak	Spacewatch	·	1.9 km	MPC; JPL
591632	2013 YS_{127}	—	December 31, 2013	Haleakala	Pan-STARRS 1	·	1.6 km	MPC; JPL
591633	2013 YV_{130}	—	December 4, 2008	Kitt Peak	Spacewatch	·	1.9 km	MPC; JPL
591634	2013 YG_{132}	—	November 1, 2008	Mount Lemmon	Mount Lemmon Survey	·	2.0 km	MPC; JPL
591635	2013 YJ_{135}	—	November 20, 2008	Kitt Peak	Spacewatch	·	1.9 km	MPC; JPL
591636	2013 YV_{142}	—	December 31, 2013	Mount Lemmon	Mount Lemmon Survey	EUN	1.1 km	MPC; JPL
591637	2013 YB_{144}	—	December 30, 2008	Mount Lemmon	Mount Lemmon Survey	·	2.6 km	MPC; JPL
591638	2013 YS_{147}	—	November 1, 2008	Mount Lemmon	Mount Lemmon Survey	·	2.0 km	MPC; JPL
591639	2013 YO_{148}	—	December 31, 2013	Mayhill-ISON	L. Elenin	·	1.4 km	MPC; JPL
591640	2013 YB_{150}	—	October 17, 2013	Haleakala	Pan-STARRS 1	·	1.2 km	MPC; JPL
591641	2013 YC_{150}	—	September 6, 2012	Mount Lemmon	Mount Lemmon Survey	EUN	1.2 km	MPC; JPL
591642	2014 AE_{1}	—	November 6, 2013	Mount Lemmon	Mount Lemmon Survey	·	1.8 km	MPC; JPL
591643	2014 AD_{3}	—	January 1, 2014	Haleakala	Pan-STARRS 1	·	1.8 km	MPC; JPL
591644	2014 AJ_{4}	—	November 26, 2013	Mount Lemmon	Mount Lemmon Survey	EUN	1.1 km	MPC; JPL
591645	2014 AM_{5}	—	February 10, 2002	Socorro	LINEAR	·	1.4 km	MPC; JPL
591646	2014 AY_{8}	—	January 1, 2014	Haleakala	Pan-STARRS 1	·	1.4 km	MPC; JPL
591647	2014 AT_{12}	—	November 25, 2013	Nogales	M. Schwartz, P. R. Holvorcem	EUN	1.1 km	MPC; JPL
591648	2014 AH_{20}	—	December 7, 2005	Kitt Peak	Spacewatch	·	1.1 km	MPC; JPL
591649	2014 AX_{21}	—	November 23, 2000	Haleakala	NEAT	MAR	1.3 km	MPC; JPL
591650	2014 AK_{24}	—	October 10, 2012	Mount Lemmon	Mount Lemmon Survey	·	1.6 km	MPC; JPL
591651	2014 AN_{25}	—	January 3, 2014	Kitt Peak	Spacewatch	·	1.7 km	MPC; JPL
591652	2014 AH_{26}	—	January 3, 2014	Kitt Peak	Spacewatch	·	1.7 km	MPC; JPL
591653	2014 AG_{38}	—	January 3, 2014	Charleston	R. Holmes	·	960 m	MPC; JPL
591654	2014 AN_{39}	—	November 1, 2008	Kitt Peak	Spacewatch	526	2.4 km	MPC; JPL
591655	2014 AM_{48}	—	March 13, 2010	Kitt Peak	Spacewatch	·	1.4 km	MPC; JPL
591656	2014 AE_{57}	—	September 25, 1998	Apache Point	SDSS Collaboration	AGN	900 m	MPC; JPL
591657	2014 AU_{58}	—	January 1, 2014	Kitt Peak	Spacewatch	·	1.5 km	MPC; JPL
591658	2014 AC_{59}	—	September 15, 2012	Catalina	CSS	·	2.2 km	MPC; JPL
591659	2014 AZ_{59}	—	January 10, 2014	Kitt Peak	Spacewatch	·	1.8 km	MPC; JPL
591660	2014 AC_{62}	—	January 2, 2014	Mount Lemmon	Mount Lemmon Survey	·	1.5 km	MPC; JPL
591661	2014 BJ_{1}	—	October 7, 2012	Haleakala	Pan-STARRS 1	AGN	1.2 km	MPC; JPL
591662	2014 BU_{1}	—	November 27, 2000	Desert Beaver	W. K. Y. Yeung	·	880 m	MPC; JPL
591663	2014 BJ_{2}	—	December 31, 2013	Haleakala	Pan-STARRS 1	·	1.6 km	MPC; JPL
591664	2014 BR_{5}	—	January 21, 2014	Mount Lemmon	Mount Lemmon Survey	·	1.4 km	MPC; JPL
591665	2014 BW_{12}	—	December 31, 2013	Kitt Peak	Spacewatch	AGN	1.3 km	MPC; JPL
591666	2014 BF_{15}	—	April 26, 2007	Mount Lemmon	Mount Lemmon Survey	·	1.9 km	MPC; JPL
591667	2014 BG_{18}	—	February 4, 2005	Kitt Peak	Spacewatch	·	1.5 km	MPC; JPL
591668	2014 BA_{22}	—	September 18, 2003	Kitt Peak	Spacewatch	·	840 m	MPC; JPL
591669	2014 BQ_{25}	—	October 16, 2012	Mount Lemmon	Mount Lemmon Survey	KOR	1.1 km	MPC; JPL
591670	2014 BX_{26}	—	October 20, 2003	Kitt Peak	Spacewatch	·	1.9 km	MPC; JPL
591671	2014 BW_{41}	—	March 9, 2005	Mount Lemmon	Mount Lemmon Survey	·	2.1 km	MPC; JPL
591672	2014 BX_{42}	—	January 16, 2009	Kitt Peak	Spacewatch	·	1.4 km	MPC; JPL
591673	2014 BO_{45}	—	October 7, 2012	Haleakala	Pan-STARRS 1	·	1.4 km	MPC; JPL
591674	2014 BA_{47}	—	October 17, 2012	Haleakala	Pan-STARRS 1	·	1.6 km	MPC; JPL
591675	2014 BT_{50}	—	October 5, 2012	Haleakala	Pan-STARRS 1	PAD	1.4 km	MPC; JPL
591676	2014 BL_{53}	—	October 20, 2007	Mount Lemmon	Mount Lemmon Survey	EOS	1.7 km	MPC; JPL
591677	2014 BV_{61}	—	February 14, 2010	Catalina	CSS	·	1.4 km	MPC; JPL
591678	2014 BC_{64}	—	January 29, 2014	Kitt Peak	Spacewatch	·	2.1 km	MPC; JPL
591679	2014 BQ_{64}	—	March 16, 2005	Mount Lemmon	Mount Lemmon Survey	·	1.8 km	MPC; JPL
591680	2014 BW_{70}	—	January 26, 2014	Haleakala	Pan-STARRS 1	·	1.1 km	MPC; JPL
591681	2014 BC_{77}	—	October 9, 2012	Mount Lemmon	Mount Lemmon Survey	·	1.4 km	MPC; JPL
591682	2014 BW_{77}	—	March 27, 2009	Catalina	CSS	·	2.0 km	MPC; JPL
591683	2014 BC_{78}	—	February 18, 2013	Mount Lemmon	Mount Lemmon Survey	L4	6.6 km	MPC; JPL
591684	2014 BS_{80}	—	January 26, 2014	Haleakala	Pan-STARRS 1	·	1.6 km	MPC; JPL
591685	2014 CA_{2}	—	February 4, 2014	Elena Remote	Oreshko, A.	EUN	1.0 km	MPC; JPL
591686	2014 CL_{4}	—	October 20, 2003	Kitt Peak	Spacewatch	·	2.1 km	MPC; JPL
591687	2014 CP_{4}	—	January 10, 2014	Mount Lemmon	Mount Lemmon Survey	DOR	1.7 km	MPC; JPL
591688	2014 CC_{7}	—	February 5, 2014	Kitt Peak	Spacewatch	AGN	1.0 km	MPC; JPL
591689	2014 CQ_{7}	—	October 26, 2008	Kitt Peak	Spacewatch	·	1.2 km	MPC; JPL
591690	2014 CU_{18}	—	September 18, 2003	Kitt Peak	Spacewatch	·	1.5 km	MPC; JPL
591691	2014 CR_{22}	—	August 28, 2003	Palomar	NEAT	EUN	1.7 km	MPC; JPL
591692	2014 CS_{23}	—	March 21, 2015	Haleakala	Pan-STARRS 1	L4	8.6 km	MPC; JPL
591693	2014 CF_{28}	—	January 4, 2013	Cerro Tololo-DECam	DECam	L4	8.2 km	MPC; JPL
591694	2014 CC_{32}	—	February 6, 2014	Mount Lemmon	Mount Lemmon Survey	·	1.4 km	MPC; JPL
591695	2014 DO_{1}	—	January 1, 2014	Mount Lemmon	Mount Lemmon Survey	·	2.6 km	MPC; JPL
591696	2014 DU_{7}	—	March 12, 2005	Kitt Peak	Deep Ecliptic Survey	KOR	1.3 km	MPC; JPL
591697	2014 DP_{9}	—	February 21, 2014	Mayhill-ISON	L. Elenin	HNS	1.3 km	MPC; JPL
591698	2014 DU_{15}	—	October 23, 2003	Kitt Peak	Deep Ecliptic Survey	NEM	2.4 km	MPC; JPL
591699	2014 DB_{17}	—	September 29, 2009	Mount Lemmon	Mount Lemmon Survey	ERI	1.5 km	MPC; JPL
591700	2014 DZ_{18}	—	September 29, 2001	Palomar	NEAT	·	2.9 km	MPC; JPL

== 591701–591800 ==
back to top

Designation			Discovery			Properties		Ref
Permanent	Provisional	Named after	Date	Site	Discoverer(s)	Category	Diam.	Ref
591701	2014 DS_{24}	—	September 19, 2003	Palomar	NEAT	·	1.8 km	MPC; JPL
591702	2014 DK_{28}	—	February 13, 2007	Mount Lemmon	Mount Lemmon Survey	·	710 m	MPC; JPL
591703	2014 DZ_{31}	—	April 5, 2003	Kitt Peak	Spacewatch	·	2.3 km	MPC; JPL
591704	2014 DM_{32}	—	October 21, 2012	Haleakala	Pan-STARRS 1	AGN	1.0 km	MPC; JPL
591705	2014 DE_{34}	—	September 12, 2001	Kitt Peak	Deep Ecliptic Survey	·	1.9 km	MPC; JPL
591706	2014 DT_{36}	—	November 17, 2007	Kitt Peak	Spacewatch	KOR	1.2 km	MPC; JPL
591707	2014 DV_{39}	—	September 20, 2006	Kitt Peak	Spacewatch	EOS	1.8 km	MPC; JPL
591708	2014 DQ_{41}	—	January 7, 2010	Mount Lemmon	Mount Lemmon Survey	·	1.2 km	MPC; JPL
591709	2014 DE_{44}	—	October 17, 2012	Haleakala	Pan-STARRS 1	·	1.8 km	MPC; JPL
591710	2014 DS_{44}	—	September 22, 2012	Mount Lemmon	Mount Lemmon Survey	·	1.3 km	MPC; JPL
591711	2014 DS_{46}	—	September 23, 2008	Kitt Peak	Spacewatch	·	1.2 km	MPC; JPL
591712	2014 DB_{49}	—	February 27, 2014	Kitt Peak	Spacewatch	EOS	1.7 km	MPC; JPL
591713	2014 DM_{49}	—	September 15, 2009	Kitt Peak	Spacewatch	L4 · ERY	7.2 km	MPC; JPL
591714	2014 DM_{53}	—	September 23, 2008	Mount Lemmon	Mount Lemmon Survey	L4	7.3 km	MPC; JPL
591715	2014 DT_{55}	—	November 5, 2007	Kitt Peak	Spacewatch	KOR	1.5 km	MPC; JPL
591716	2014 DF_{56}	—	September 7, 2011	Kitt Peak	Spacewatch	·	1.8 km	MPC; JPL
591717	2014 DQ_{56}	—	September 26, 2003	Apache Point	SDSS Collaboration	·	1.5 km	MPC; JPL
591718	2014 DU_{56}	—	February 26, 2014	Haleakala	Pan-STARRS 1	EOS	1.4 km	MPC; JPL
591719	2014 DZ_{58}	—	September 23, 2011	Haleakala	Pan-STARRS 1	·	2.5 km	MPC; JPL
591720	2014 DB_{59}	—	October 16, 2012	Kitt Peak	Spacewatch	·	1.3 km	MPC; JPL
591721	2014 DO_{62}	—	February 26, 2014	Haleakala	Pan-STARRS 1	·	1.8 km	MPC; JPL
591722	2014 DP_{63}	—	January 10, 2008	Mount Lemmon	Mount Lemmon Survey	THM	2.1 km	MPC; JPL
591723	2014 DN_{64}	—	February 26, 2014	Haleakala	Pan-STARRS 1	L4	6.5 km	MPC; JPL
591724	2014 DJ_{65}	—	February 26, 2014	Haleakala	Pan-STARRS 1	JUN	900 m	MPC; JPL
591725	2014 DA_{66}	—	February 26, 2014	Haleakala	Pan-STARRS 1	·	2.0 km	MPC; JPL
591726	2014 DR_{66}	—	February 26, 2014	Haleakala	Pan-STARRS 1	·	1.8 km	MPC; JPL
591727	2014 DF_{78}	—	December 1, 2006	Mount Lemmon	Mount Lemmon Survey	·	3.1 km	MPC; JPL
591728	2014 DD_{86}	—	February 26, 2014	Mount Lemmon	Mount Lemmon Survey	·	1.4 km	MPC; JPL
591729	2014 DN_{99}	—	August 21, 2001	Kitt Peak	Spacewatch	EOS	1.6 km	MPC; JPL
591730	2014 DU_{102}	—	October 11, 2010	Mount Lemmon	Mount Lemmon Survey	L4	6.3 km	MPC; JPL
591731	2014 DE_{107}	—	February 26, 2009	Kitt Peak	Spacewatch	·	1.5 km	MPC; JPL
591732	2014 DN_{117}	—	February 27, 2014	Kitt Peak	Spacewatch	EOS	1.5 km	MPC; JPL
591733	2014 DY_{121}	—	January 23, 2014	Mount Lemmon	Mount Lemmon Survey	L4	7.3 km	MPC; JPL
591734	2014 DD_{122}	—	February 28, 2014	Haleakala	Pan-STARRS 1	·	2.3 km	MPC; JPL
591735	2014 DB_{124}	—	October 15, 2012	Haleakala	Pan-STARRS 1	·	1.5 km	MPC; JPL
591736	2014 DJ_{124}	—	October 12, 2010	Mount Lemmon	Mount Lemmon Survey	L4	7.5 km	MPC; JPL
591737	2014 DH_{127}	—	March 29, 2004	Kitt Peak	Spacewatch	·	1.6 km	MPC; JPL
591738	2014 DE_{130}	—	February 28, 2014	Haleakala	Pan-STARRS 1	L4	6.1 km	MPC; JPL
591739	2014 DE_{137}	—	November 14, 2007	Kitt Peak	Spacewatch	KOR	1.4 km	MPC; JPL
591740	2014 DO_{139}	—	August 29, 2002	Kitt Peak	Spacewatch	·	2.1 km	MPC; JPL
591741	2014 DK_{140}	—	March 5, 2002	Kitt Peak	Spacewatch	L4	9.9 km	MPC; JPL
591742	2014 DC_{141}	—	November 30, 2003	Socorro	LINEAR	·	750 m	MPC; JPL
591743	2014 DQ_{146}	—	February 26, 2014	Haleakala	Pan-STARRS 1	·	1.5 km	MPC; JPL
591744	2014 DM_{148}	—	October 8, 2012	Haleakala	Pan-STARRS 1	·	1.4 km	MPC; JPL
591745	2014 DV_{150}	—	February 26, 2014	Mount Lemmon	Mount Lemmon Survey	·	1.9 km	MPC; JPL
591746	2014 DG_{151}	—	February 11, 2004	Kitt Peak	Spacewatch	·	1.9 km	MPC; JPL
591747	2014 DK_{152}	—	September 24, 2011	Haleakala	Pan-STARRS 1	EOS	1.4 km	MPC; JPL
591748	2014 DQ_{153}	—	November 12, 2001	Apache Point	SDSS Collaboration	·	1.9 km	MPC; JPL
591749	2014 DB_{158}	—	May 25, 2015	Haleakala	Pan-STARRS 1	·	1.3 km	MPC; JPL
591750	2014 DQ_{159}	—	June 13, 2015	Haleakala	Pan-STARRS 1	·	1.7 km	MPC; JPL
591751	2014 DW_{171}	—	February 27, 2014	Haleakala	Pan-STARRS 1	·	2.1 km	MPC; JPL
591752	2014 DZ_{172}	—	February 28, 2014	Haleakala	Pan-STARRS 1	·	1.4 km	MPC; JPL
591753	2014 DA_{173}	—	February 28, 2014	Haleakala	Pan-STARRS 1	·	2.0 km	MPC; JPL
591754	2014 DM_{174}	—	February 24, 2014	Haleakala	Pan-STARRS 1	L4	6.9 km	MPC; JPL
591755	2014 DQ_{176}	—	February 26, 2014	Haleakala	Pan-STARRS 1	·	2.9 km	MPC; JPL
591756	2014 DU_{178}	—	February 24, 2014	Haleakala	Pan-STARRS 1	L4	8.5 km	MPC; JPL
591757	2014 DY_{178}	—	February 28, 2014	Haleakala	Pan-STARRS 1	L4 · 006	7.8 km	MPC; JPL
591758	2014 DS_{183}	—	February 28, 2014	Haleakala	Pan-STARRS 1	KOR	1.3 km	MPC; JPL
591759	2014 EO_{3}	—	January 12, 2000	Kitt Peak	Spacewatch	·	2.6 km	MPC; JPL
591760	2014 EX_{3}	—	February 24, 2014	Haleakala	Pan-STARRS 1	L4	8.9 km	MPC; JPL
591761	2014 EZ_{8}	—	January 19, 2013	Kitt Peak	Spacewatch	L4	8.7 km	MPC; JPL
591762	2014 EG_{12}	—	November 12, 2010	Mount Lemmon	Mount Lemmon Survey	L4	8.5 km	MPC; JPL
591763 Orishutʹ	2014 ES_{12}	Orishutʹ	February 27, 2014	Mayhill-ISON	L. Elenin	·	1.7 km	MPC; JPL
591764	2014 EW_{15}	—	March 29, 2009	Mount Lemmon	Mount Lemmon Survey	·	1.7 km	MPC; JPL
591765	2014 EF_{19}	—	February 20, 2002	Kitt Peak	Spacewatch	L4	8.2 km	MPC; JPL
591766	2014 EE_{20}	—	May 7, 2010	Mount Lemmon	Mount Lemmon Survey	KOR	1.4 km	MPC; JPL
591767	2014 EO_{20}	—	October 24, 2005	Mauna Kea	A. Boattini	·	1.6 km	MPC; JPL
591768	2014 EB_{26}	—	February 28, 2014	Haleakala	Pan-STARRS 1	L4 · 006	7.6 km	MPC; JPL
591769	2014 EC_{26}	—	October 11, 2004	Kitt Peak	Spacewatch	(5)	970 m	MPC; JPL
591770	2014 EK_{27}	—	January 10, 2013	Haleakala	Pan-STARRS 1	L4	6.8 km	MPC; JPL
591771	2014 EA_{29}	—	March 6, 2014	Mount Lemmon	Mount Lemmon Survey	L4	8.4 km	MPC; JPL
591772	2014 EQ_{35}	—	November 19, 2003	Kitt Peak	Spacewatch	·	2.2 km	MPC; JPL
591773	2014 EP_{40}	—	January 6, 2013	Mount Lemmon	Mount Lemmon Survey	·	2.3 km	MPC; JPL
591774	2014 EX_{42}	—	May 3, 2009	Mount Lemmon	Mount Lemmon Survey	·	2.5 km	MPC; JPL
591775	2014 EC_{43}	—	February 11, 2014	Mount Lemmon	Mount Lemmon Survey	·	2.5 km	MPC; JPL
591776	2014 EG_{44}	—	April 12, 2010	Mount Lemmon	Mount Lemmon Survey	·	1.0 km	MPC; JPL
591777	2014 EG_{47}	—	February 26, 2014	Mount Lemmon	Mount Lemmon Survey	EOS	1.7 km	MPC; JPL
591778	2014 ER_{50}	—	February 10, 2014	Haleakala	Pan-STARRS 1	·	2.6 km	MPC; JPL
591779	2014 EM_{54}	—	March 20, 2015	Haleakala	Pan-STARRS 1	L4	6.3 km	MPC; JPL
591780	2014 EV_{54}	—	September 6, 2008	Kitt Peak	Spacewatch	L4	9.8 km	MPC; JPL
591781	2014 EQ_{57}	—	February 28, 2014	Haleakala	Pan-STARRS 1	L4	6.8 km	MPC; JPL
591782	2014 EJ_{58}	—	October 14, 2010	Mount Lemmon	Mount Lemmon Survey	L4	7.1 km	MPC; JPL
591783	2014 EJ_{60}	—	September 5, 2008	Kitt Peak	Spacewatch	L4	7.5 km	MPC; JPL
591784	2014 EK_{60}	—	October 9, 2007	Kitt Peak	Spacewatch	·	1.6 km	MPC; JPL
591785	2014 EP_{76}	—	December 5, 2012	Mount Lemmon	Mount Lemmon Survey	·	1.8 km	MPC; JPL
591786	2014 ED_{78}	—	October 20, 2007	Kitt Peak	Spacewatch	·	2.0 km	MPC; JPL
591787	2014 EY_{80}	—	September 24, 2011	Bergisch Gladbach	W. Bickel	EOS	1.8 km	MPC; JPL
591788	2014 EZ_{84}	—	November 27, 2010	Mount Lemmon	Mount Lemmon Survey	L4 · ERY	6.5 km	MPC; JPL
591789	2014 EM_{90}	—	September 5, 2008	Kitt Peak	Spacewatch	L4	8.2 km	MPC; JPL
591790	2014 EN_{93}	—	October 11, 2007	Kitt Peak	Spacewatch	·	1.8 km	MPC; JPL
591791	2014 EC_{96}	—	January 5, 2013	Mount Lemmon	Mount Lemmon Survey	HOF	2.4 km	MPC; JPL
591792	2014 EL_{97}	—	September 5, 2008	Kitt Peak	Spacewatch	L4	8.9 km	MPC; JPL
591793	2014 ES_{97}	—	October 12, 2007	Kitt Peak	Spacewatch	AGN	900 m	MPC; JPL
591794	2014 EV_{97}	—	October 10, 2007	Kitt Peak	Spacewatch	·	1.7 km	MPC; JPL
591795	2014 EG_{109}	—	November 16, 2007	Mount Lemmon	Mount Lemmon Survey	·	2.0 km	MPC; JPL
591796	2014 EH_{113}	—	March 3, 2014	Cerro Tololo	DECam	·	1.9 km	MPC; JPL
591797	2014 ES_{123}	—	May 20, 2015	Mount Lemmon	Mount Lemmon Survey	EOS	1.4 km	MPC; JPL
591798	2014 EU_{127}	—	December 1, 2008	Mount Lemmon	Mount Lemmon Survey	·	2.2 km	MPC; JPL
591799	2014 EV_{131}	—	November 3, 2010	Mount Lemmon	Mount Lemmon Survey	L4	6.6 km	MPC; JPL
591800	2014 ES_{137}	—	November 5, 2007	Kitt Peak	Spacewatch	·	1.8 km	MPC; JPL

== 591801–591900 ==
back to top

Designation			Discovery			Properties		Ref
Permanent	Provisional	Named after	Date	Site	Discoverer(s)	Category	Diam.	Ref
591801	2014 EO_{138}	—	May 21, 2015	Haleakala	Pan-STARRS 1	·	1.7 km	MPC; JPL
591802	2014 ED_{146}	—	October 22, 2012	Haleakala	Pan-STARRS 1	·	1.3 km	MPC; JPL
591803	2014 EA_{151}	—	December 22, 2008	Catalina	CSS	·	2.3 km	MPC; JPL
591804	2014 EG_{152}	—	March 4, 2014	Cerro Tololo	DECam	EMA	2.2 km	MPC; JPL
591805	2014 EX_{160}	—	December 12, 2012	Mount Lemmon	Mount Lemmon Survey	L4	6.9 km	MPC; JPL
591806	2014 EG_{180}	—	October 5, 2016	Mount Lemmon	Mount Lemmon Survey	·	2.2 km	MPC; JPL
591807	2014 ET_{195}	—	October 12, 2007	Mount Lemmon	Mount Lemmon Survey	·	1.8 km	MPC; JPL
591808 Dienesvaléria	2014 EU_{202}	Dienesvaléria	October 20, 2012	Piszkéstető	K. Sárneczky, A. Király	GEF	1.1 km	MPC; JPL
591809	2014 EV_{203}	—	September 30, 2003	Kitt Peak	Spacewatch	·	1.2 km	MPC; JPL
591810	2014 ED_{206}	—	October 19, 2011	Mount Lemmon	Mount Lemmon Survey	·	1.1 km	MPC; JPL
591811	2014 EU_{208}	—	September 15, 2012	Kitt Peak	Spacewatch	·	1.9 km	MPC; JPL
591812	2014 EM_{210}	—	July 29, 2008	Kitt Peak	Spacewatch	L4	6.8 km	MPC; JPL
591813	2014 EE_{211}	—	September 17, 2006	Kitt Peak	Spacewatch	·	2.1 km	MPC; JPL
591814	2014 EH_{212}	—	August 10, 2016	Haleakala	Pan-STARRS 1	·	2.0 km	MPC; JPL
591815	2014 EG_{214}	—	October 14, 2001	Apache Point	SDSS Collaboration	·	860 m	MPC; JPL
591816	2014 EV_{214}	—	September 24, 2017	Haleakala	Pan-STARRS 1	·	1.3 km	MPC; JPL
591817	2014 ER_{215}	—	October 11, 2010	Mount Lemmon	Mount Lemmon Survey	L4	7.8 km	MPC; JPL
591818	2014 EA_{220}	—	February 20, 2009	Kitt Peak	Spacewatch	EOS	1.4 km	MPC; JPL
591819	2014 EH_{228}	—	October 30, 2017	Haleakala	Pan-STARRS 1	·	1.7 km	MPC; JPL
591820	2014 EM_{245}	—	February 28, 2014	Haleakala	Pan-STARRS 1	·	1.7 km	MPC; JPL
591821	2014 EA_{249}	—	March 6, 2014	Oukaïmeden	C. Rinner	TIR	2.5 km	MPC; JPL
591822	2014 EH_{250}	—	April 7, 2003	Kitt Peak	Spacewatch	·	2.2 km	MPC; JPL
591823	2014 EL_{251}	—	May 1, 2009	Cerro Burek	Burek, Cerro	·	2.3 km	MPC; JPL
591824	2014 ET_{253}	—	March 6, 2014	Mount Lemmon	Mount Lemmon Survey	EOS	1.2 km	MPC; JPL
591825	2014 ES_{254}	—	October 18, 2012	Haleakala	Pan-STARRS 1	·	950 m	MPC; JPL
591826	2014 FV_{1}	—	October 22, 2011	Mount Lemmon	Mount Lemmon Survey	L4	10 km	MPC; JPL
591827	2014 FM_{5}	—	November 6, 2010	Mount Lemmon	Mount Lemmon Survey	L4	9.0 km	MPC; JPL
591828	2014 FO_{5}	—	March 13, 2003	Kitt Peak	Spacewatch	L4	10 km	MPC; JPL
591829	2014 FS_{8}	—	September 26, 2012	Mount Lemmon	Mount Lemmon Survey	WIT	1 km	MPC; JPL
591830	2014 FM_{13}	—	September 24, 2012	Charleston	R. Holmes	EUN	1.2 km	MPC; JPL
591831	2014 FU_{13}	—	September 16, 2009	Kitt Peak	Spacewatch	L4	7.7 km	MPC; JPL
591832	2014 FN_{18}	—	February 1, 2003	Palomar	NEAT	·	3.4 km	MPC; JPL
591833	2014 FK_{21}	—	September 2, 2011	Haleakala	Pan-STARRS 1	·	1.9 km	MPC; JPL
591834	2014 FL_{24}	—	March 6, 2014	Mayhill-ISON	L. Elenin	·	2.0 km	MPC; JPL
591835	2014 FF_{28}	—	July 24, 2000	Kitt Peak	Spacewatch	·	1.9 km	MPC; JPL
591836	2014 FD_{29}	—	November 4, 2007	Mount Lemmon	Mount Lemmon Survey	·	1.9 km	MPC; JPL
591837	2014 FT_{29}	—	September 25, 2003	Haleakala	NEAT	ADE	2.2 km	MPC; JPL
591838	2014 FK_{30}	—	December 27, 2011	Mount Lemmon	Mount Lemmon Survey	L4	8.6 km	MPC; JPL
591839	2014 FZ_{39}	—	March 11, 2014	Mount Lemmon	Mount Lemmon Survey	L4	6.7 km	MPC; JPL
591840	2014 FH_{41}	—	December 23, 2012	Haleakala	Pan-STARRS 1	·	2.4 km	MPC; JPL
591841	2014 FS_{42}	—	December 29, 2008	Mount Lemmon	Mount Lemmon Survey	·	1.3 km	MPC; JPL
591842	2014 FD_{44}	—	January 24, 2014	Haleakala	Pan-STARRS 1	·	2.1 km	MPC; JPL
591843	2014 FF_{44}	—	March 13, 2005	Kitt Peak	Spacewatch	·	2.2 km	MPC; JPL
591844	2014 FZ_{45}	—	March 25, 2014	Haleakala	Pan-STARRS 1	·	1.9 km	MPC; JPL
591845	2014 FS_{47}	—	February 22, 2003	Palomar	NEAT	·	2.7 km	MPC; JPL
591846	2014 FZ_{74}	—	March 24, 2014	Haleakala	Pan-STARRS 1	·	2.0 km	MPC; JPL
591847	2014 FZ_{76}	—	March 29, 2014	Mount Lemmon	Mount Lemmon Survey	·	2.4 km	MPC; JPL
591848	2014 FN_{83}	—	March 24, 2014	Haleakala	Pan-STARRS 1	·	2.5 km	MPC; JPL
591849	2014 GP	—	November 12, 2012	Mount Lemmon	Mount Lemmon Survey	·	1.2 km	MPC; JPL
591850	2014 GT	—	September 6, 2008	Kitt Peak	Spacewatch	L4	9.2 km	MPC; JPL
591851	2014 GX_{2}	—	March 14, 2011	Mount Lemmon	Mount Lemmon Survey	·	1.1 km	MPC; JPL
591852	2014 GT_{3}	—	February 26, 2014	Haleakala	Pan-STARRS 1	EOS	1.9 km	MPC; JPL
591853	2014 GR_{8}	—	July 30, 2008	Kitt Peak	Spacewatch	L4 · 006	10 km	MPC; JPL
591854	2014 GF_{9}	—	February 9, 2010	Mount Lemmon	Mount Lemmon Survey	MAS	670 m	MPC; JPL
591855	2014 GM_{9}	—	September 24, 2008	Kitt Peak	Spacewatch	L4 · ERY	9.1 km	MPC; JPL
591856	2014 GW_{9}	—	February 7, 2008	Kitt Peak	Spacewatch	·	2.1 km	MPC; JPL
591857	2014 GA_{10}	—	April 2, 2014	Kitt Peak	Spacewatch	·	1.9 km	MPC; JPL
591858	2014 GT_{12}	—	September 1, 2005	Kitt Peak	Spacewatch	·	1.6 km	MPC; JPL
591859	2014 GE_{14}	—	September 16, 2010	Catalina	CSS	TIR	2.9 km	MPC; JPL
591860	2014 GM_{14}	—	February 28, 2014	Haleakala	Pan-STARRS 1	·	1.9 km	MPC; JPL
591861 Sergeyyazev	2014 GE_{18}	Sergeyyazev	January 6, 2008	Zelenchukskaya	Station, Zelenchukskaya	·	1.7 km	MPC; JPL
591862	2014 GL_{19}	—	April 4, 2014	Mount Lemmon	Mount Lemmon Survey	·	1.5 km	MPC; JPL
591863	2014 GM_{22}	—	September 20, 2011	Mount Lemmon	Mount Lemmon Survey	·	1.8 km	MPC; JPL
591864	2014 GM_{23}	—	October 14, 2007	Mount Lemmon	Mount Lemmon Survey	·	2.0 km	MPC; JPL
591865	2014 GF_{25}	—	October 19, 2011	Kitt Peak	Spacewatch	EOS	1.7 km	MPC; JPL
591866	2014 GH_{29}	—	February 25, 2014	Haleakala	Pan-STARRS 1	·	2.4 km	MPC; JPL
591867	2014 GK_{29}	—	August 29, 2005	Kitt Peak	Spacewatch	·	570 m	MPC; JPL
591868	2014 GZ_{29}	—	December 3, 2004	Kitt Peak	Spacewatch	·	1.0 km	MPC; JPL
591869	2014 GZ_{30}	—	April 6, 2005	Mount Lemmon	Mount Lemmon Survey	·	1.5 km	MPC; JPL
591870	2014 GH_{32}	—	February 1, 2013	Kitt Peak	Spacewatch	EOS	1.9 km	MPC; JPL
591871	2014 GO_{33}	—	September 13, 2005	Kitt Peak	Spacewatch	·	1.7 km	MPC; JPL
591872	2014 GV_{35}	—	November 26, 2011	Mount Lemmon	Mount Lemmon Survey	·	3.0 km	MPC; JPL
591873	2014 GF_{38}	—	January 29, 2014	Kitt Peak	Spacewatch	·	1.5 km	MPC; JPL
591874	2014 GM_{39}	—	May 21, 2011	Haleakala	Pan-STARRS 1	·	520 m	MPC; JPL
591875	2014 GJ_{44}	—	May 7, 2003	Catalina	CSS	TIR	5.0 km	MPC; JPL
591876	2014 GS_{46}	—	March 27, 2014	Haleakala	Pan-STARRS 1	·	2.2 km	MPC; JPL
591877	2014 GC_{47}	—	April 5, 2014	Haleakala	Pan-STARRS 1	·	2.8 km	MPC; JPL
591878	2014 GN_{54}	—	September 6, 2008	Kitt Peak	Spacewatch	L4	6.2 km	MPC; JPL
591879	2014 GL_{56}	—	March 13, 2003	Kitt Peak	Spacewatch	·	2.3 km	MPC; JPL
591880	2014 GX_{57}	—	February 1, 2013	Kitt Peak	Spacewatch	·	2.8 km	MPC; JPL
591881	2014 GC_{61}	—	February 12, 2000	Apache Point	SDSS Collaboration	·	1.7 km	MPC; JPL
591882	2014 GG_{64}	—	August 13, 2004	Cerro Tololo	Deep Ecliptic Survey	THM	2.3 km	MPC; JPL
591883	2014 GO_{64}	—	April 10, 2014	Haleakala	Pan-STARRS 1	·	1.2 km	MPC; JPL
591884	2014 GA_{65}	—	April 1, 2003	Apache Point	SDSS	·	3.3 km	MPC; JPL
591885	2014 GL_{65}	—	September 25, 2016	Haleakala	Pan-STARRS 1	·	1.9 km	MPC; JPL
591886	2014 GY_{69}	—	April 5, 2014	Haleakala	Pan-STARRS 1	·	580 m	MPC; JPL
591887	2014 GU_{74}	—	April 5, 2014	Haleakala	Pan-STARRS 1	·	2.6 km	MPC; JPL
591888	2014 GA_{75}	—	April 5, 2014	Haleakala	Pan-STARRS 1	·	1.6 km	MPC; JPL
591889	2014 GE_{75}	—	April 5, 2014	Haleakala	Pan-STARRS 1	EOS	1.3 km	MPC; JPL
591890	2014 GG_{75}	—	April 2, 2014	Mount Lemmon	Mount Lemmon Survey	·	2.4 km	MPC; JPL
591891	2014 GN_{75}	—	April 4, 2014	Mayhill-ISON	L. Elenin	·	2.3 km	MPC; JPL
591892	2014 GD_{77}	—	April 1, 2014	Mount Lemmon	Mount Lemmon Survey	·	2.6 km	MPC; JPL
591893	2014 GV_{78}	—	April 5, 2014	Haleakala	Pan-STARRS 1	·	2.2 km	MPC; JPL
591894	2014 GP_{80}	—	April 1, 2014	Mount Lemmon	Mount Lemmon Survey	GEF	810 m	MPC; JPL
591895	2014 HO_{11}	—	January 6, 2010	Kitt Peak	Spacewatch	·	850 m	MPC; JPL
591896	2014 HJ_{13}	—	October 31, 2010	Mount Lemmon	Mount Lemmon Survey	·	2.3 km	MPC; JPL
591897	2014 HV_{15}	—	January 15, 2007	Mauna Kea	P. A. Wiegert	·	1.4 km	MPC; JPL
591898	2014 HX_{17}	—	March 26, 2009	Kitt Peak	Spacewatch	EOS	1.6 km	MPC; JPL
591899	2014 HP_{19}	—	September 23, 2005	Kitt Peak	Spacewatch	·	2.7 km	MPC; JPL
591900	2014 HG_{35}	—	December 12, 2012	Kitt Peak	Spacewatch	·	2.1 km	MPC; JPL

== 591901–592000 ==
back to top

Designation			Discovery			Properties		Ref
Permanent	Provisional	Named after	Date	Site	Discoverer(s)	Category	Diam.	Ref
591901	2014 HK_{39}	—	April 24, 2014	Mount Lemmon	Mount Lemmon Survey	·	1.4 km	MPC; JPL
591902	2014 HY_{39}	—	April 24, 2014	Mount Lemmon	Mount Lemmon Survey	·	2.0 km	MPC; JPL
591903	2014 HT_{40}	—	May 21, 2006	Kitt Peak	Spacewatch	(5)	830 m	MPC; JPL
591904	2014 HG_{42}	—	April 25, 2003	Kitt Peak	Spacewatch	EOS	1.6 km	MPC; JPL
591905	2014 HO_{42}	—	August 12, 2004	Cerro Tololo	Deep Ecliptic Survey	·	2.2 km	MPC; JPL
591906	2014 HD_{49}	—	April 22, 2009	Mount Lemmon	Mount Lemmon Survey	·	1.3 km	MPC; JPL
591907	2014 HJ_{49}	—	April 23, 2014	Cerro Tololo-DECam	DECam	·	1.5 km	MPC; JPL
591908	2014 HS_{49}	—	February 28, 2008	Mount Lemmon	Mount Lemmon Survey	·	1.7 km	MPC; JPL
591909	2014 HT_{49}	—	April 23, 2014	Cerro Tololo-DECam	DECam	THM	1.8 km	MPC; JPL
591910	2014 HN_{53}	—	December 23, 2012	Haleakala	Pan-STARRS 1	KOR	1.2 km	MPC; JPL
591911	2014 HR_{64}	—	October 26, 2011	Haleakala	Pan-STARRS 1	·	2.4 km	MPC; JPL
591912	2014 HS_{71}	—	October 14, 2010	Kitt Peak	Spacewatch	·	2.4 km	MPC; JPL
591913	2014 HY_{80}	—	November 15, 2011	Mount Lemmon	Mount Lemmon Survey	·	2.0 km	MPC; JPL
591914	2014 HD_{88}	—	April 23, 2014	Cerro Tololo-DECam	DECam	·	1.2 km	MPC; JPL
591915	2014 HH_{95}	—	April 24, 2014	Mount Lemmon	Mount Lemmon Survey	·	1.7 km	MPC; JPL
591916	2014 HS_{96}	—	March 11, 2003	Kitt Peak	Spacewatch	EOS	1.4 km	MPC; JPL
591917	2014 HD_{100}	—	March 30, 2003	Kitt Peak	Deep Ecliptic Survey	·	1.9 km	MPC; JPL
591918	2014 HD_{104}	—	April 23, 2014	Cerro Tololo-DECam	DECam	EOS	1.7 km	MPC; JPL
591919	2014 HJ_{121}	—	March 29, 2014	Kitt Peak	Spacewatch	·	540 m	MPC; JPL
591920	2014 HX_{124}	—	September 30, 2006	Mount Lemmon	Mount Lemmon Survey	·	2.9 km	MPC; JPL
591921	2014 HD_{128}	—	July 16, 2004	Cerro Tololo	Deep Ecliptic Survey	·	2.7 km	MPC; JPL
591922	2014 HK_{135}	—	November 21, 2009	Kitt Peak	Spacewatch	·	460 m	MPC; JPL
591923	2014 HU_{137}	—	September 23, 2011	Haleakala	Pan-STARRS 1	·	1.1 km	MPC; JPL
591924	2014 HB_{138}	—	October 24, 2011	Kitt Peak	Spacewatch	·	2.6 km	MPC; JPL
591925	2014 HF_{138}	—	September 26, 2011	Haleakala	Pan-STARRS 1	·	1.4 km	MPC; JPL
591926	2014 HV_{139}	—	April 5, 2014	Haleakala	Pan-STARRS 1	·	540 m	MPC; JPL
591927	2014 HZ_{149}	—	March 12, 2008	Kitt Peak	Spacewatch	·	2.2 km	MPC; JPL
591928	2014 HV_{151}	—	July 30, 2005	Palomar	NEAT	·	2.4 km	MPC; JPL
591929	2014 HU_{152}	—	March 31, 2003	Cerro Tololo	Deep Lens Survey	·	2.2 km	MPC; JPL
591930	2014 HW_{157}	—	April 24, 2014	Mount Lemmon	Mount Lemmon Survey	·	1.7 km	MPC; JPL
591931	2014 HO_{161}	—	March 28, 2014	Mount Lemmon	Mount Lemmon Survey	·	3.2 km	MPC; JPL
591932	2014 HZ_{162}	—	April 24, 2014	Mount Lemmon	Mount Lemmon Survey	·	2.2 km	MPC; JPL
591933	2014 HH_{163}	—	February 12, 2000	Apache Point	SDSS Collaboration	DOR	2.3 km	MPC; JPL
591934	2014 HL_{163}	—	September 24, 2012	Kitt Peak	Spacewatch	·	770 m	MPC; JPL
591935	2014 HO_{165}	—	April 1, 2003	Apache Point	SDSS Collaboration	·	2.0 km	MPC; JPL
591936	2014 HH_{167}	—	December 22, 2012	Haleakala	Pan-STARRS 1	·	2.2 km	MPC; JPL
591937	2014 HQ_{170}	—	April 5, 2014	Haleakala	Pan-STARRS 1	LIX	3.7 km	MPC; JPL
591938	2014 HP_{173}	—	December 12, 2012	Mount Lemmon	Mount Lemmon Survey	EOS	1.5 km	MPC; JPL
591939	2014 HB_{180}	—	November 12, 2006	Mount Lemmon	Mount Lemmon Survey	·	2.6 km	MPC; JPL
591940	2014 HO_{182}	—	October 26, 2011	Haleakala	Pan-STARRS 1	·	2.3 km	MPC; JPL
591941	2014 HH_{185}	—	October 3, 2005	Catalina	CSS	·	2.7 km	MPC; JPL
591942	2014 HW_{189}	—	October 21, 2006	Lulin	LUSS	·	2.4 km	MPC; JPL
591943	2014 HF_{191}	—	April 30, 2014	Haleakala	Pan-STARRS 1	EOS	1.7 km	MPC; JPL
591944	2014 HE_{202}	—	April 30, 2014	Haleakala	Pan-STARRS 1	EMA	2.3 km	MPC; JPL
591945	2014 HN_{220}	—	April 30, 2014	Haleakala	Pan-STARRS 1	·	2.3 km	MPC; JPL
591946	2014 HL_{222}	—	April 29, 2014	Haleakala	Pan-STARRS 1	·	2.2 km	MPC; JPL
591947	2014 HL_{223}	—	April 29, 2014	Haleakala	Pan-STARRS 1	·	1.6 km	MPC; JPL
591948	2014 HJ_{226}	—	April 3, 2008	Kitt Peak	Spacewatch	·	2.2 km	MPC; JPL
591949	2014 JJ_{9}	—	May 3, 2014	Mount Lemmon	Mount Lemmon Survey	EOS	1.5 km	MPC; JPL
591950	2014 JW_{11}	—	September 7, 2005	Uccle	T. Pauwels	EOS	1.8 km	MPC; JPL
591951	2014 JY_{11}	—	February 1, 2009	Kitt Peak	Spacewatch	·	970 m	MPC; JPL
591952	2014 JR_{17}	—	March 1, 2009	Mount Lemmon	Mount Lemmon Survey	·	2.4 km	MPC; JPL
591953	2014 JS_{19}	—	May 2, 2003	Kitt Peak	Spacewatch	·	2.7 km	MPC; JPL
591954	2014 JP_{20}	—	April 7, 2014	Kitt Peak	Spacewatch	HYG	2.3 km	MPC; JPL
591955	2014 JZ_{29}	—	May 5, 2003	Kitt Peak	Spacewatch	·	2.7 km	MPC; JPL
591956	2014 JB_{32}	—	September 11, 2004	Palomar	NEAT	·	3.4 km	MPC; JPL
591957	2014 JY_{32}	—	May 2, 2006	Mount Lemmon	Mount Lemmon Survey	·	900 m	MPC; JPL
591958	2014 JE_{36}	—	March 26, 2008	Mount Lemmon	Mount Lemmon Survey	THM	2.0 km	MPC; JPL
591959	2014 JC_{38}	—	April 29, 2014	ESA OGS	ESA OGS	·	2.6 km	MPC; JPL
591960	2014 JF_{41}	—	April 30, 2014	Haleakala	Pan-STARRS 1	EOS	1.8 km	MPC; JPL
591961	2014 JD_{45}	—	August 30, 2005	Palomar	NEAT	fast	2.7 km	MPC; JPL
591962	2014 JV_{47}	—	September 4, 2010	Kitt Peak	Spacewatch	EOS	1.6 km	MPC; JPL
591963	2014 JS_{48}	—	October 31, 2006	Mount Lemmon	Mount Lemmon Survey	EOS	1.7 km	MPC; JPL
591964 Jakucs	2014 JA_{49}	Jakucs	September 7, 2010	Piszkéstető	K. Sárneczky, Z. Kuli	·	2.5 km	MPC; JPL
591965	2014 JV_{49}	—	November 10, 2005	Piszkéstető	K. Sárneczky	(31811)	3.7 km	MPC; JPL
591966	2014 JQ_{50}	—	August 10, 2004	Siding Spring	SSS	·	3.4 km	MPC; JPL
591967	2014 JL_{82}	—	May 3, 2014	Haleakala	Pan-STARRS 1	·	2.6 km	MPC; JPL
591968	2014 JW_{92}	—	May 7, 2014	Haleakala	Pan-STARRS 1	·	2.8 km	MPC; JPL
591969	2014 JX_{92}	—	May 6, 2014	Haleakala	Pan-STARRS 1	·	3.2 km	MPC; JPL
591970	2014 JX_{99}	—	May 7, 2014	Haleakala	Pan-STARRS 1	THB	2.4 km	MPC; JPL
591971	2014 JD_{100}	—	May 3, 2014	Haleakala	Pan-STARRS 1	·	2.6 km	MPC; JPL
591972	2014 JB_{104}	—	May 2, 2014	Mount Lemmon	Mount Lemmon Survey	EOS	1.3 km	MPC; JPL
591973	2014 JB_{106}	—	May 4, 2014	Mount Lemmon	Mount Lemmon Survey	AGN	1.1 km	MPC; JPL
591974	2014 JQ_{108}	—	May 6, 2014	Haleakala	Pan-STARRS 1	·	3.5 km	MPC; JPL
591975	2014 JM_{123}	—	May 6, 2014	Haleakala	Pan-STARRS 1	·	2.2 km	MPC; JPL
591976	2014 JN_{123}	—	May 7, 2014	Haleakala	Pan-STARRS 1	EOS	1.4 km	MPC; JPL
591977	2014 KY_{2}	—	March 28, 2014	Kitt Peak	Spacewatch	·	2.2 km	MPC; JPL
591978	2014 KX_{5}	—	April 5, 2014	Haleakala	Pan-STARRS 1	·	860 m	MPC; JPL
591979	2014 KZ_{5}	—	December 5, 2007	Kitt Peak	Spacewatch	·	1.7 km	MPC; JPL
591980	2014 KH_{6}	—	January 13, 2008	Kitt Peak	Spacewatch	·	1.7 km	MPC; JPL
591981	2014 KN_{9}	—	November 16, 2011	Kitt Peak	Spacewatch	·	2.1 km	MPC; JPL
591982	2014 KT_{14}	—	April 24, 2014	Haleakala	Pan-STARRS 1	LIX	3.7 km	MPC; JPL
591983	2014 KY_{18}	—	May 3, 2014	Mount Lemmon	Mount Lemmon Survey	·	3.2 km	MPC; JPL
591984	2014 KX_{22}	—	February 9, 2014	Haleakala	Pan-STARRS 1	·	1.4 km	MPC; JPL
591985	2014 KH_{33}	—	May 22, 2014	Haleakala	Pan-STARRS 1	VER	2.3 km	MPC; JPL
591986	2014 KR_{39}	—	September 26, 2008	Mount Lemmon	Mount Lemmon Survey	L4	10 km	MPC; JPL
591987	2014 KY_{41}	—	April 24, 2014	Kitt Peak	Spacewatch	·	2.6 km	MPC; JPL
591988	2014 KA_{42}	—	February 9, 2013	Haleakala	Pan-STARRS 1	EOS	1.6 km	MPC; JPL
591989	2014 KE_{42}	—	April 24, 2014	Haleakala	Pan-STARRS 1	·	3.2 km	MPC; JPL
591990	2014 KP_{47}	—	April 5, 2014	Haleakala	Pan-STARRS 1	EOS	1.6 km	MPC; JPL
591991	2014 KQ_{48}	—	October 12, 2006	Kitt Peak	Spacewatch	·	1.5 km	MPC; JPL
591992	2014 KU_{48}	—	May 9, 2014	Haleakala	Pan-STARRS 1	·	1.5 km	MPC; JPL
591993	2014 KH_{50}	—	November 10, 2004	Kitt Peak	Deep Ecliptic Survey	·	2.0 km	MPC; JPL
591994	2014 KY_{50}	—	October 12, 2010	Vail-Jarnac	Glinos, T.	·	3.5 km	MPC; JPL
591995	2014 KL_{60}	—	May 24, 2014	Haleakala	Pan-STARRS 1	·	2.2 km	MPC; JPL
591996	2014 KL_{63}	—	October 4, 2005	Palomar	NEAT	·	2.6 km	MPC; JPL
591997	2014 KW_{63}	—	September 16, 2010	Mount Lemmon	Mount Lemmon Survey	·	2.6 km	MPC; JPL
591998	2014 KQ_{66}	—	November 21, 2006	Mount Lemmon	Mount Lemmon Survey	·	2.3 km	MPC; JPL
591999	2014 KQ_{69}	—	May 7, 2014	Haleakala	Pan-STARRS 1	·	2.5 km	MPC; JPL
592000	2014 KX_{69}	—	January 18, 2012	Mount Lemmon	Mount Lemmon Survey	VER	1.9 km	MPC; JPL

back to top

== Meaning of names ==
As minor planet discoveries are confirmed, they are given a permanent number by the IAU's Minor Planet Center (MPC), and the discoverers can then submit names for them, following the IAU's naming conventions. The list below concerns those minor planets in the specified number-range that have received names, and explains the meanings of those names.

Official naming citations of newly named small Solar System bodies are approved and published in a bulletin by IAU's Working Group for Small Bodies Nomenclature (WGSBN). Before May 2021, citations were published in MPC's Minor Planet Circulars for many decades. Recent citations can also be found on the JPL Small-Body Database (SBDB). Until his death in 2016, German astronomer Lutz D. Schmadel compiled these citations into the Dictionary of Minor Planet Names (DMP) and regularly updated the collection.

Based on Paul Herget's The Names of the Minor Planets, Schmadel also researched the unclear origin of numerous asteroids, most of which had been named prior to World War II. This article incorporates text from this source, which is in the public domain: SBDB New namings may only be added to this list below after official publication as the preannouncement of names is condemned. The WGSBN publishes a comprehensive guideline for the naming rules of non-cometary small Solar System bodies.

Named minor planet	Provisional	This minor planet was named for...	Ref; Catalog
591201 Johnpye	2013 ED_{48}	John Pye, American astronomer and Professor Emeritus at the University of Hawaiʻi Maui College.	IAU · 591201
591347 Tarczylajos	2013 JC_{7}	Lajos Tarczy, Hungarian natural scientist, educator, and a member of the Hungarian Academy of Sciences.	IAU · 591347
591396 Presser	2013 PR_{103}	Gábor Presser, Hungarian composer, pianist, and singer.	IAU · 591396
591426 Adalawson	2013 RP_{21}	Ada Lawson (1870–1961), grandmother of the discoverer of the minor planet Norman Falla. Born in a small village in mid-Victorian England, she trained as a cook and housekeeper and passed her skills to her family.	IAU · 591426
591592 Carlanderson	2013 YX_{44}	Carl David Anderson (1905–1991), an American physicist.	IAU · 591592
591763 Orishutʹ	2014 ES_{12}	Orishutʹ (Оришуть), a Russian village along the Yushut basin near the city of Yoshkar-Ola. It was named as part of the village's 200th anniversary.	IAU · 591763
591808 Dienesvaléria	2014 EU_{202}	Valéria Dienes (1879–1978), Hungarian writer, dance pedagogue and philosopher.	IAU · 591808
591861 Sergeyyazev	2014 GE_{18}	Sergey Yazev (b.1958), a third-generation Siberian astronomer, professor at Irkutsk State University	IAU · 591861
591964 Jakucs	2014 JA_{49}	László Jakucs (1926–2001) was a Hungarian geologist and speleologist, who discovered the Béke Cave in the Aggtelek Karst. Jakucs organized, and led for 28 years, the Department of Natural Geography at the Szeged University. He also made a number of educational nature films.	IAU · 591964
