= Ilet =

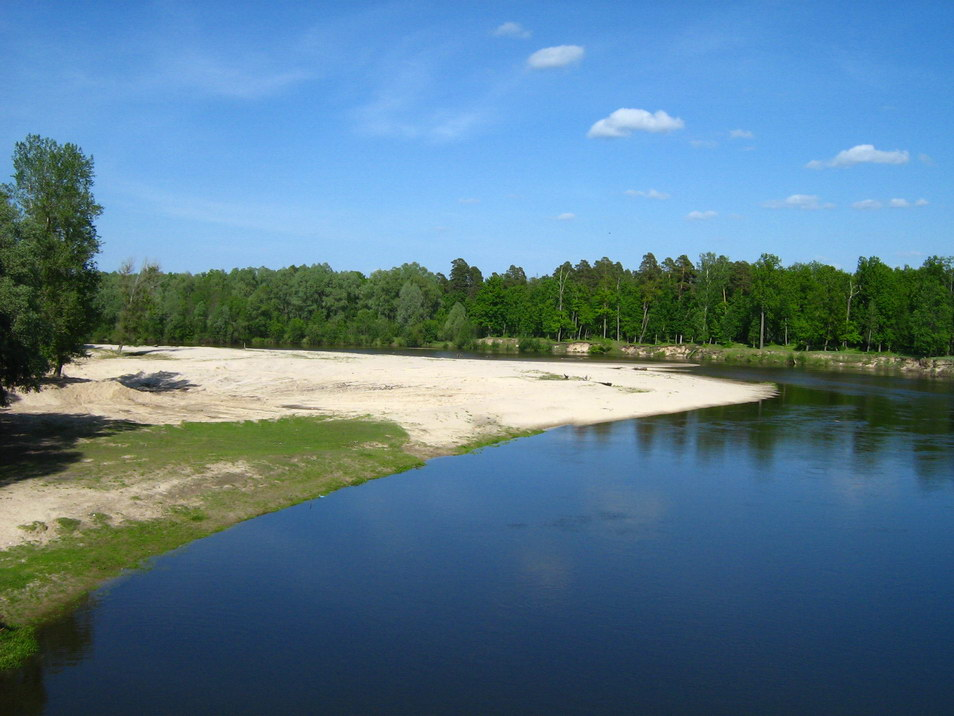
- River Ilet in the Republic of Mari El

Location
- Country: Mari El and Tatarstan, Russia

Physical characteristics
- Source
  - location: Mari El
- Mouth: Volga
  - location: Kuybyshev Reservoir
  - coordinates: 55°52′13″N 48°21′22″E
  - elevation: 53 m (174 ft)
- Length: 204 km (127 mi)
- Basin size: 6,450 km^{2} (2,490 sq mi)
- Discharge
  - average: 1,180 m^{3}/s (42,000 cu ft/s) (near mouth)

Basin features
- Progression: Volga→ Caspian Sea

The Ilet (Mari: Элнет; Russian: Илеть; Tatar: Илләт) is a river in Mari El, Russia. It is 204 kilometres (127 mi) long, and has a drainage basin of 6,450 square kilometres (2,490 sq mi). Major tributaries are the Ashit, Yushut, Voncha and Petyalka. Minimum mineralization is 1000–1400 mg/L. Tourism and rafting are popular.
