= Yushut =

Yushut, Üšüt
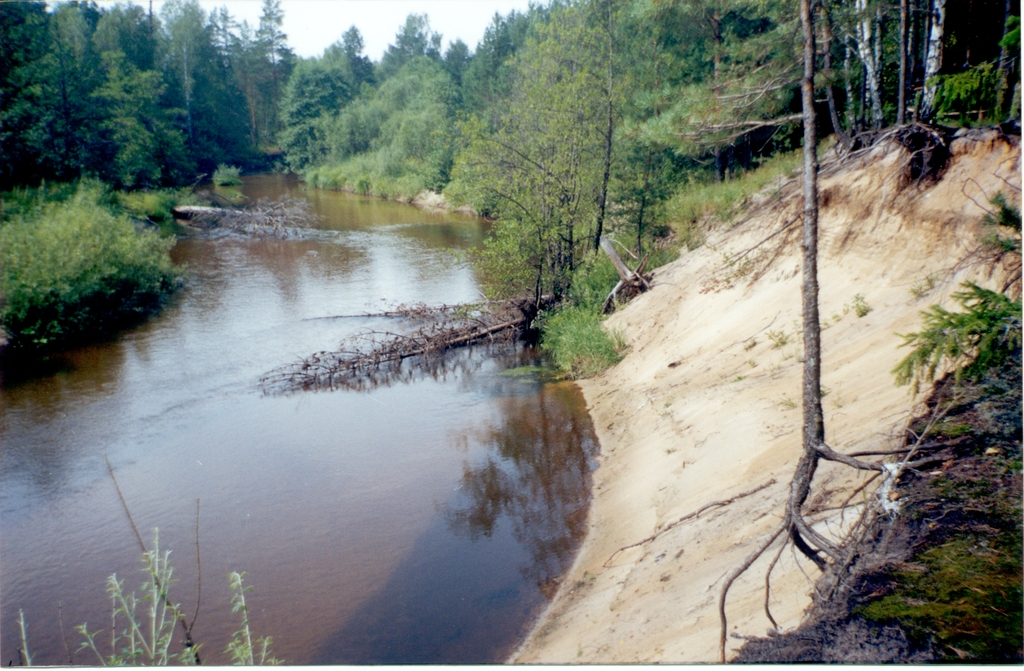

- Mouth of Yushut

Location
- Country: Mari El, Russia

Physical characteristics
- Mouth: Ilet
  - coordinates: 56°09′29″N 48°24′13″E
- Length: 108 km (67 mi)
- Basin size: 1,200 km^{2} (460 sq mi)

Basin features
- Progression: Ilet→ Volga→ Caspian Sea

The Yushut (Mari: Ӱшӱт, Üšüt , Russian: Юшут) is a river in Mari El, Russia, a right tributary of the Ilet. It is 108 kilometres (67 mi) long, and has a drainage basin of 1,200 square kilometres (460 sq mi).

The major inhabited localities are Mochalishche settlement and Oshutyaly village.

The river is a popular place for rafting. The area it flows through attracts sports tourists and Tolkienists.
