= Mochalishche =

Mochalishche (Russian: Мочалище) is the name of several rural localities in Russia:

- Mochalishche, Kirov Oblast, a village in Adyshevsky Rural Okrug of Orichevsky District in Kirov Oblast; 58°17′N 49°23′E
- Mochalishche, Mari El Republic, a settlement under the administrative jurisdiction of Suslonger Urban-Type Settlement in Zvenigovsky District of the Mari El Republic; 56°20′N 48°21′E
- Mochalishche, Tver Oblast, a village in Dmitrovskoye Rural Settlement of Selizharovsky District in Tver Oblast; 56°41′N 33°10′E
