= Ashit =

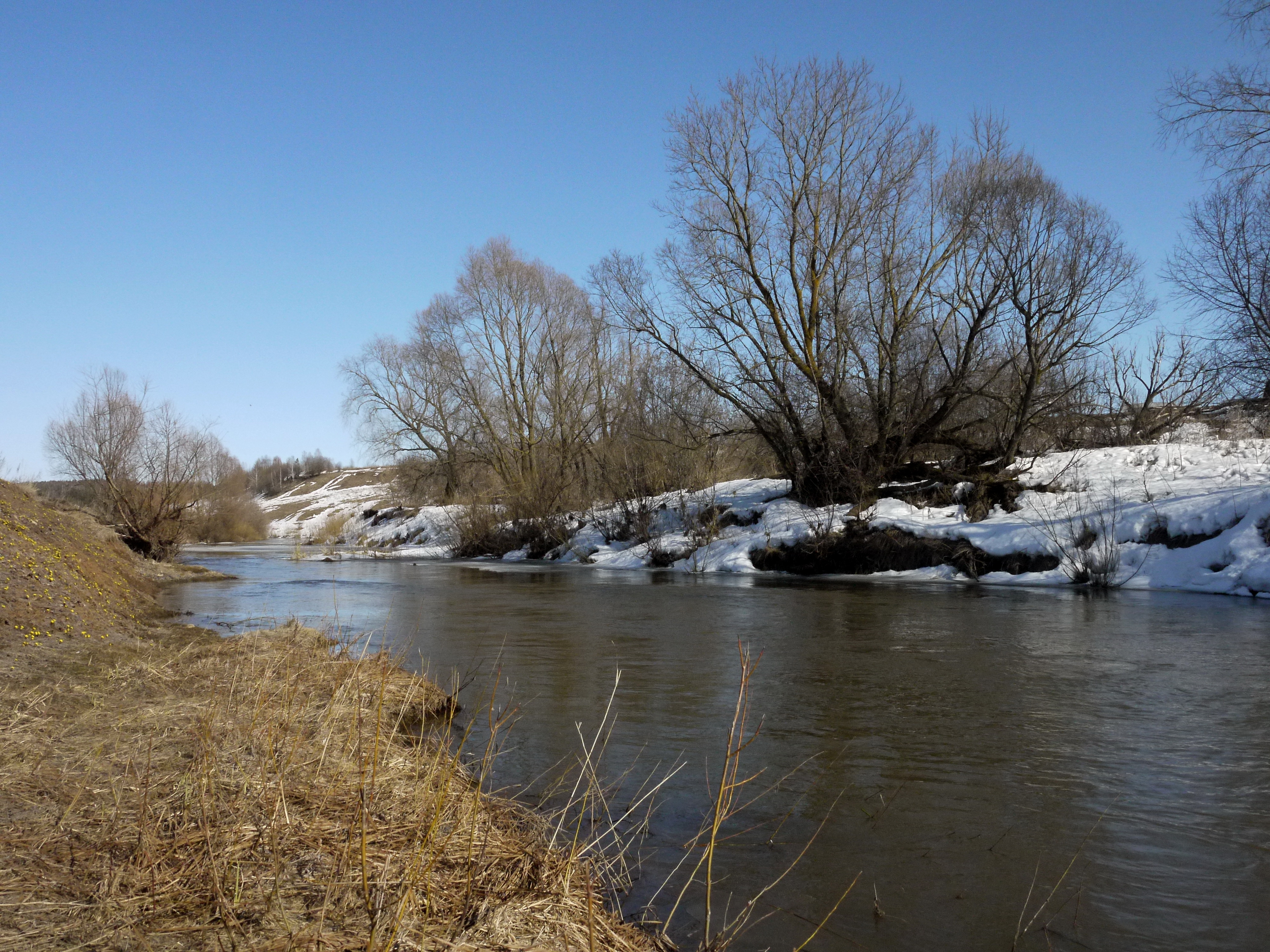

- Location of mouth in Russia

Location
- Country: Mari El and Tatarstan, Russia

Physical characteristics
- Source
  - location: Ashitbash, Arsky District, Tatarstan
- Mouth: Ilet
  - location: Nurmuchash, Mari El
  - coordinates: 56°11′57″N 48°57′29″E
- Length: 89 km (55 mi)
- Basin size: 1,065 km^{2} (411 mi^{2})

Basin features
- Progression: Ilet→ Volga→ Caspian Sea

The Ashit (Russian: Ашит; Tatar: Ашыт [ʌˈʂɯt]) is a river in Tatarstan and Mari El, Russian Federation, a left-bank tributary of the Ilet. It is 89 kilometres (55 mi) long, and its drainage basin covers 1,065 square kilometres (411 mi^{2}).

Major tributaries are the Ura, Semit, Shashi, Urtemka, and Ilinka. The maximal mineralization 450 mg/L. The average sediment deposition at the river mouth per year is 180 millimetres (7.1 in). Drainage is regulated. The lower part of the valley is swamped. The villages Alat and Bolshaya Atnya are in the river valley.
