= Battle of Bender =

The Battle of Bender, Battle of Tighina or Battle of Bendery may refer to:

- Skirmish at Bender at 1713, fought between the Swedish Empire and the Ottoman Empire, which was an Ottoman victory
- Battle of Bender (1738), fought between the Russian Empire and the Ottoman Empire; Ottoman victory
- Siege of Bender (1770), fought between the Russian Empire and the Ottoman Empire; Russian victory
- Battle of Tighina (1789), fought between the Russian Empire and the Ottoman Empire; Russian victory
- Battle of Tighina (1918), fought between the Kingdom of Romania and the Rumcherod, a Soviet revolutionary committee; Romanian victory
- Bender Uprising in 1919, orchestrated by Bolshevik local groups against Romanian rule; Romanian victory
- Battle of Bender (1992), fought between the Moldova and Transnistria during the Transnistria War; Russian-backed Transnistrian victory
