= Petr Ivanovich Panin =

Russian general (1721–1789)

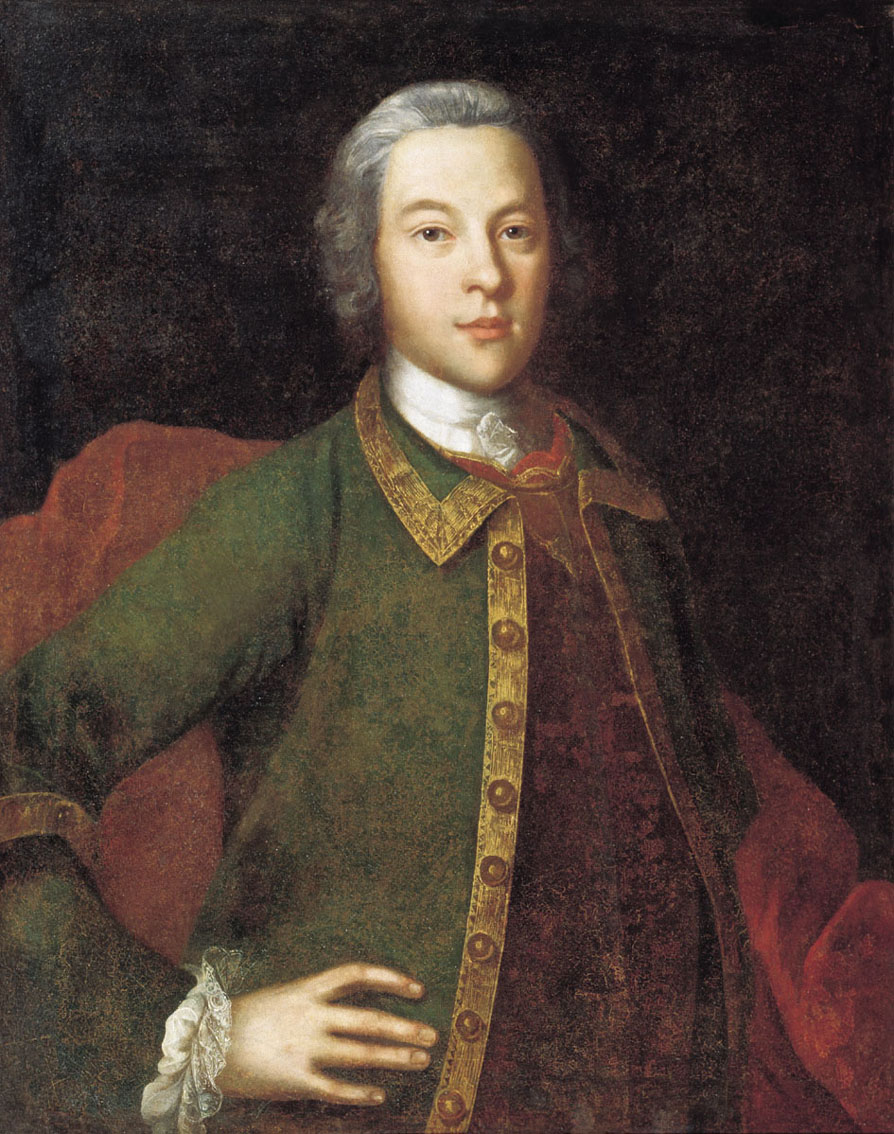
- Portrait by Ivan Vishnyakov, 1742
- Born: 1721
- Died: 26 April 1789 (aged 67–68); Moscow, Russian Empire
- Spouses: Anna Alekseyevna Tatishcheva; Maria Rodionovna Weidel
- Issue: Ekaterina Petrovna Panina; Nikita Petrovich Panin; Sofia Petrovna Panina
- Father: Ivan Vasilevich Panin
- Mother: Agrafena Everlakova

Count Pyotr (Petr) Ivanovich Panin (Russian: Пётр Ива́нович Па́нин; 1721 – 26 April 1789) was a Russian soldier who later served as a general-in-chief in the Imperial Russian Army.

== Life ==
He was younger brother of Nikita Ivanovich Panin and the grand uncle of Alexander Kurakin. He was also the father of Nikita Petrovich Panin.

He fought with distinction in the Seven Years' War and in the Russo-Turkish War of 1768–1774. He was also involved in capturing Bender on September 27, 1770. In 1773–1775, he participated in suppressing Pugachev's Rebellion.

He died in Moscow, as a senior general of the Russian Army.

== Legacy ==
On August 29, 2010, in memory of the liberation of Bender from Turkish rule, a monument to Count Petr Ivanovich Panin was unveiled at the Main Gate of the Tighina (Bender, Bendery) Fortress.

== Sources ==
- Original text adapted from Meyers Konversations-Lexikon, 4th edition.
- "Панин, Петр Иванович" . Brockhaus and Efron Encyclopedic Dictionary (in Russian). 1906.
