= Siege of Bender (1770) =

1770 military conflict of the Russo-Turkish War of 1768–1774

- Part of the Russo-Turkish War (1768–1774)
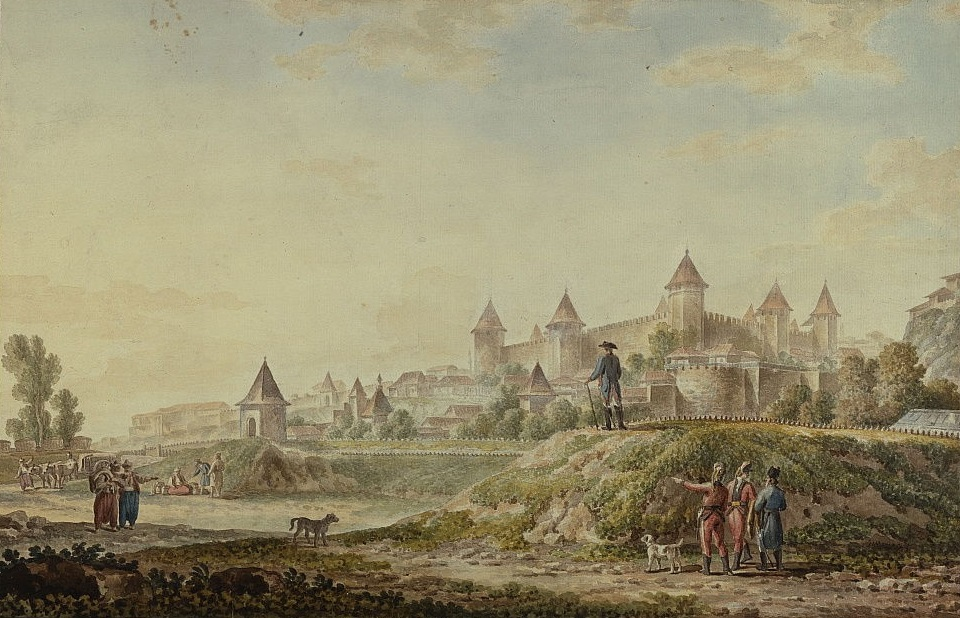
- M. M. Ivanov. View of the fortress in Bender (1790)
Date	26 July [O.S. 15 July] 1770 – 27 September [O.S. 16 September] 1770
Location	Bender, Ottoman Empire 46°50′00″N 29°29′00″E
Result	Russian victory

Belligerents
Russian Empire	Ottoman Empire

Commanders and leaders
Petr Ivanovich Panin; Rodion Härbel	Urzhi Valasi †

Strength
33,000	12,500

Casualties and losses
1,700 killed 4,600 wounded	7,000 killed 5,300 captured

The siege of Bender (Russian: Осада Бендер, romanized: Osada Bender) was a military conflict of the Russo-Turkish War of 1768–1774. The 2nd Russian Army, led by Count Petr Ivanovich Panin, took the Turkish fortress of Bender, located in modern-day Moldova.

== Siege ==
The siege of the Tighina Fortress, which was a powerful stronghold of the Ottoman Empire, commenced on 15 July 1770 and lasted two months. The Bender garrison, numbering over 12,000 people (according to other sources, up to 30,000 people), including select Janissaries, confronted a nearly 33,000-strong Russian army (18,567 infantry, 10,673 cavalry, 3,574 artillery and engineering troops). The commander of the 2nd Army, Count Petr Ivanovich Panin, initially hoped to force the fortress to capitulate by attrition and cannon fire. Rodion Nikolajewitsch Härbel played an important role in managing the siege works.

On the eve of the assault planned for 15 September, the shelling intensified, and a fire broke out in the city due to the cannonade. On 15 September, a powerful mine (400 pounds of gunpowder) placed under the wall was detonated, and part of the fortress wall collapsed from the explosion. On that night, Panin gave the order to storm the fortress. The fierce siege in the city engulfed in flames lasted all night; by morning the surviving defenders of the fortress had laid down their arms. During the assault, about 7,000 Turks were killed, the rest were taken captive. Russian losses during the capture of the fortress amounted to 6,300 people, of whom 1,700 were killed. Thus, the capture of this powerful fortress became the bloodiest siege for the Russian side in the entire war.

== Aftermath ==
The result of the capture of Bender was the temporary transition of much of the area between the Dniester and the Prut passing onto Russian control. For his success, Panin was awarded the Order of St. George.

== Sources ==
- Petrov, Andrei Nikolaevich (Andrei Nikolaevich Petrov) (1866). Война России с Турцией и Польскими конфедератами [Russia's War with Turkey and the Polish Confederates] (in Russian). Vol. 2. St.Petersburg: Типография Веймара.
- Shefov, Nikolay (2006). Battles of Russia. Military-historical library. Moscow: ACT. ISBN 5-9713-1217-0.
