= Nikita Petrovich Panin =

Imperial Russian diplomat

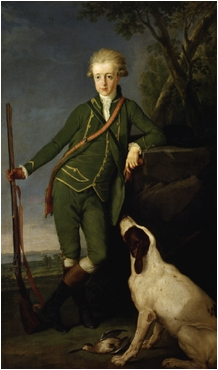
- Nikita Panin at the Age of 18.
- Born: 17 April 1770; Kharkiv, Kharkov Governorate, Russian Empire
- Died: 1 March 1837 (aged 66); Dugino Estate, Smolensk Oblast, Russian Empire
- Noble family: Panin
- Spouse: Sofia Vladimirovna Orlova
- Issue: Alexander Nikitich Panin; Viktor Nikitich Panin
- Father: Petr Ivanovich Panin
- Mother: Maria Rodionovna Weidel

Count Nikita Petrovich Panin (Russian: Граф Ники́та Петро́вич Па́нин; 17 April 1770 – 1 March 1837) was an Imperial Russian diplomat, vice-chancellor, and (acting) State Chancellor and Foreign Minister of Russia. He was a nephew of Count Nikita Ivanovich Panin, son of Petr Ivanovich Panin, son-in-law of Count Vladimir Orlov.

Nikita P. Panin plotted the assassination of Paul I of Russia together with Count Peter Ludwig von der Pahlen and the Russo-Neapolitan Admiral José de Ribas. Ribas died before the assassination, which was actually carried out on 23 March [O.S. 11 March] 1801 by a band of dismissed officers headed by General Bennigsen, a Hanoverian in the Russian service, and General Yashvil, a Georgian. The assassination brought Alexander I of Russia to the throne.

He died in 1837 and was buried in the Smolensk Estate in Dugino, Smolensk Oblast.

Preceded by Viktor Pavlovich Kochubey (acting)	Imperial Chancellor of Russia (acting); 1799–1800	Succeeded by Stepan Alekseyevich Kolychev (acting)
