= Siege of Bender (1738) =

Ottoman-Russian battle in 1738

- Part of the Russo-Turkish War (1735–1739)
Date	mid–July 1738
Location	Bender, Moldavia
Result	Ottoman victory

Belligerents
Ottoman Empire	Russian Empire

Commanders and leaders
Mustafa Aga	Burkhard Christoph von Münnich

Strength
60,000 soldiers	Unknown

Casualties and losses
Unknown	Unknown

The Siege of Bender (1738) was fought during the Austro-Russian–Turkish War (1735–39).

== Battle ==
In 1738, under the leadership of Burkhard Christoph von Münnich, the Russian Empire organized the Bender Expedition. This initiative aimed to conclude the ongoing wars with the Ottoman Empire, which had not yielded the desired results. The Russians besieged Bender, but their efforts to capture the city and its surrounding key forts were unsuccessful. During their attempt to cross the Dniester River's right side, they encountered well-fortified positions and a formidable Ottoman force numbering 60,000 on the river's opposite bank. Ottoman forces discovered the Russians' attempt to construct mobile bridges for a covert crossing and then attacked them. Consequently, despite strenuous efforts, the Russians were unable to reach the opposite bank of the Dniester River by mid-July 1738 and were constantly harassed by Ottomans and Crimeans.

== Sources ==
- Virginia Aksan (2021), The Ottomans 1700-1923: An Empire Besieged.
- Adrien Richer (1789), Histoire De Russie, Vol III.
