= Tighina Fortress =

15th-century fortress in Bender, Moldova

Coordinates: 46.8381°N 29.4874°E

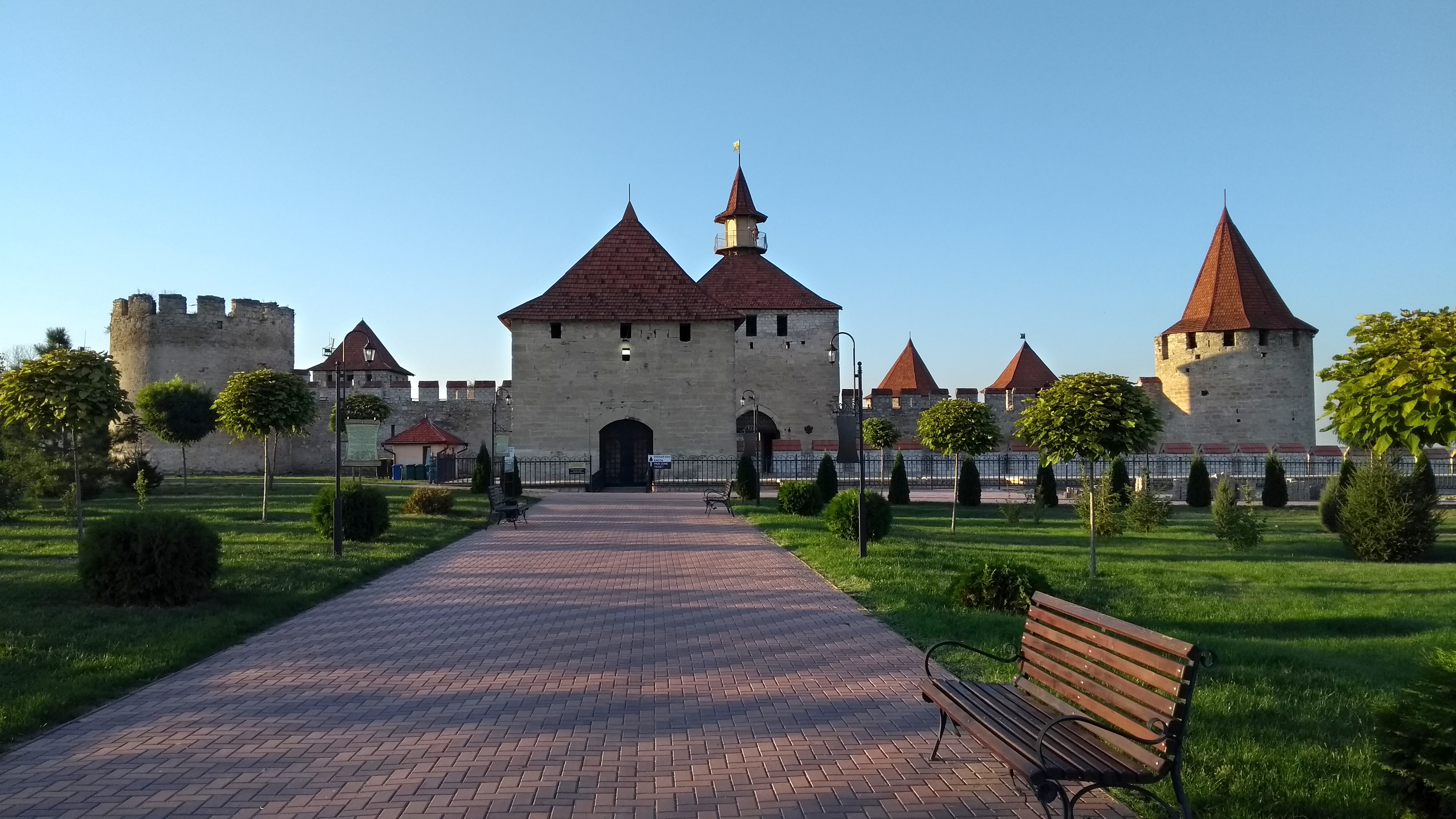
South side of the Tighina Fortress (2021)

The Tighina Fortress (Romanian: Cetatea Tighina; renamed by the Turks as Bender; Russian: Бендерская крепость, romanized: Benderskaya krepost') was a 15th-century fortress on the right bank of the Dniester River in Bender (also known as Tighina), Moldova, built from earth and wood during the reign of Prince Stephen the Great. In 1538 it was conquered by the Turkish sultan Suleiman the Magnificent, who ordered it to be rebuilt in stone and enlarged. It was later a Soviet military base, and is currently a musuem listed on the State Register of Protected Monuments of the Republic of Moldova.

== History ==
The earliest mention of Tighina, as a settlement and customs post, is found in the commercial privilege granted on October 6, 1408, by the Prince of Moldavia Alexander the Good to the merchants of Lwów. Later, throughout the 15th and 16th centuries, the name of Tighina is recorded in medieval documents. In the Moldavian documents that mention the locality, in Tighina, along with the royal customs and the crossing, a guard is mentioned. In the only document from the Prince Stephen the Great (1457-1504) in which Tighina appears, the guard is also mentioned.

As for the fortress of Tighina, 19th-century researchers, following the information circulating in previous centuries, accredited the idea that it was built in the 12th century by the Genoese, as well as Hotin and Cetatea Albă fortresses. The military historian Aleksander Zaschuk saw in the architecture of the inner citadel a pronounced western character. The first and only definite mention of the existence of the Moldavian fortification itself, of the fortress (probably of wood and earth), is found in the Moldavian-Polish Chronicle from the middle of the 16th century. It relates, referring to the Ottoman conquests of 1538, that the Turkish sultan Suleiman "took possession of the Moldavian fortress Tighina."

Archaeological investigations of limited extent, carried out by the researcher Ion Hîncu in 1969, allowed the discovery of housing complexes and a defense ditch belonging to the 15th-16th centuries. Archaeological excavations have identified the presence of a wood and earthen fortification dating back to the fifteenth century, which could correspond to the customs post mentioned in the 1408 commercial privilege, or to a fort built by Tatar populations in the fourteenth century. The surface of the fortress' courtyard of circular or ovoid shape was covered with a layer of ashes. Ceramic and metal objects bear traces of fire.

The fortress, having been conquered in 1538 by the Turkish sultan Suleiman the Magnificent, became part of a Turkish raya. Its old name was replaced by a new one, Bender, meaning "port" or "water gate." During this period, Suleiman ordered that the fortress be rebuilt in stone and enlarged according to the design of the architect Sinan.

The Ottomans turned the fortress into a well-established fighting outpost, and a garrison of soldiers guaranteed the loyalty of the Moldovians. At that time the fortress, built of stone, was a quadrangle surrounded on three sides by a very deep ditch.

By the end of the 16th century, Moldavian detachments had attacked the Bender fortress several times, but without any success. In the summer of 1574, John the Brave had besieged it with his army. In 1595 and 1600 Michael the Brave made two attempts, but neither of the two rulers succeed. Around the same time, Bender was attacked by the Zaporozhian Cossacks. In the years 1705-1707 the works of strengthening this fortification of special military importance on behalf of Turks was continued by the prince Antioh Cantemir. In this last variant, the fortress consisted of an ensemble of 10 bastions and 11 towers surrounded by the same traditional defense ditch.

The bitter fate of the fortress ruled by the Turks made the chronicler Miron Costin write that "the fortress of Tighina has darkened". As a result of the three Russo-Turkish wars, it came under the rule of the Russian Empire in 1812, and was used as a military garrison until 1917.

The fortress was returned to Romania after World War I, but plans to turn it into a historic monument were not carried out due to World War II, when it was instead used to hold Soviet prisoners of war captured by German and Romanian forces. It was returned to Russian control when Moldova became part of the USSR. It was again a military garrison under Soviet control.

After the dissolution of the Soviet Union in 1991, the fortress has been located in separatist Transnitria, which performed restoration to repair damage caused by military use. The first state of a larger restoration project was carried out from 2021 to 2023, funded by the European Union. This has allowed concerts by the Moldovan National Youth Orchestra to be held inside the fortress.

== Gallery ==
=== 2021 ===
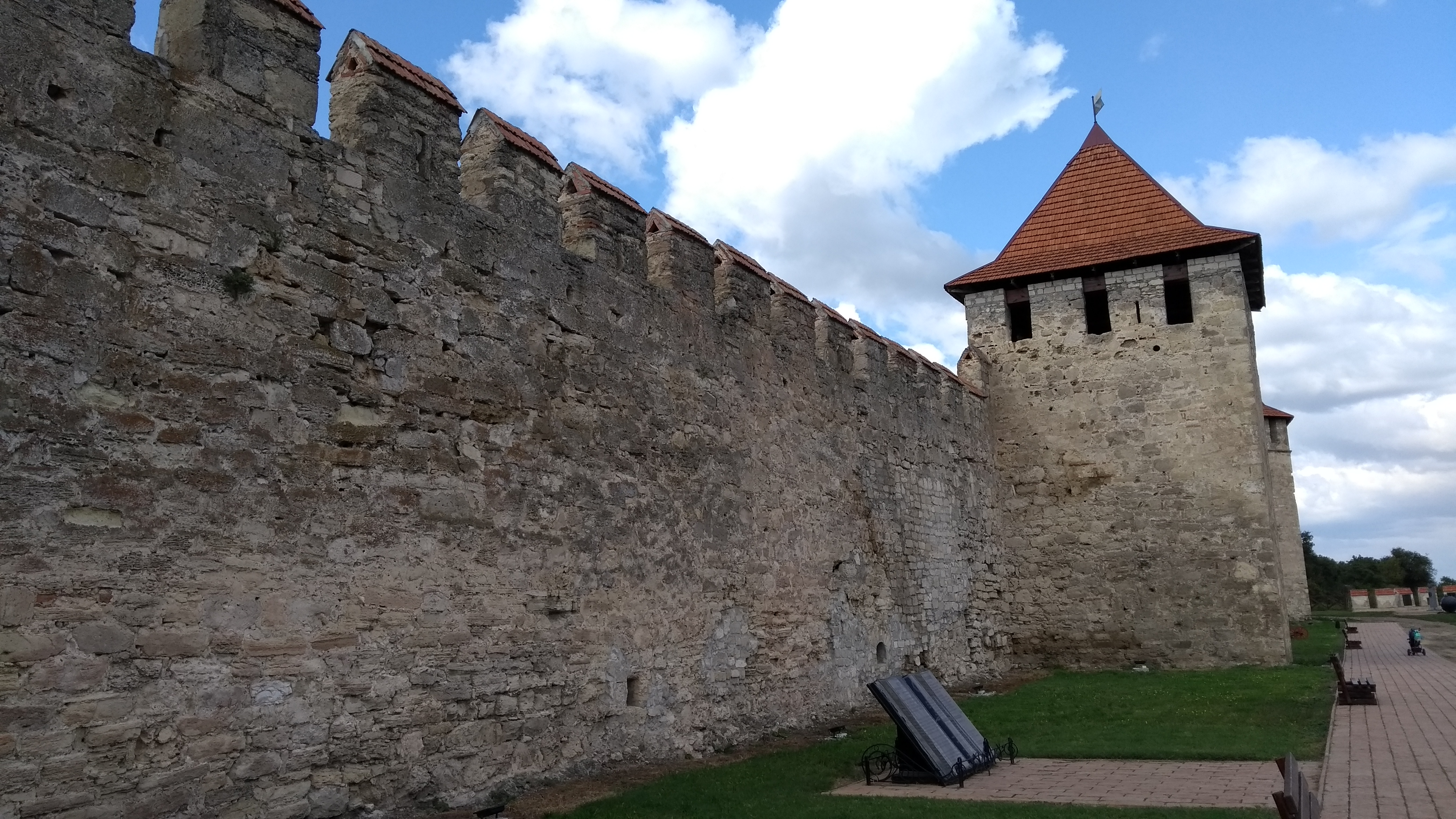
Eastern wall

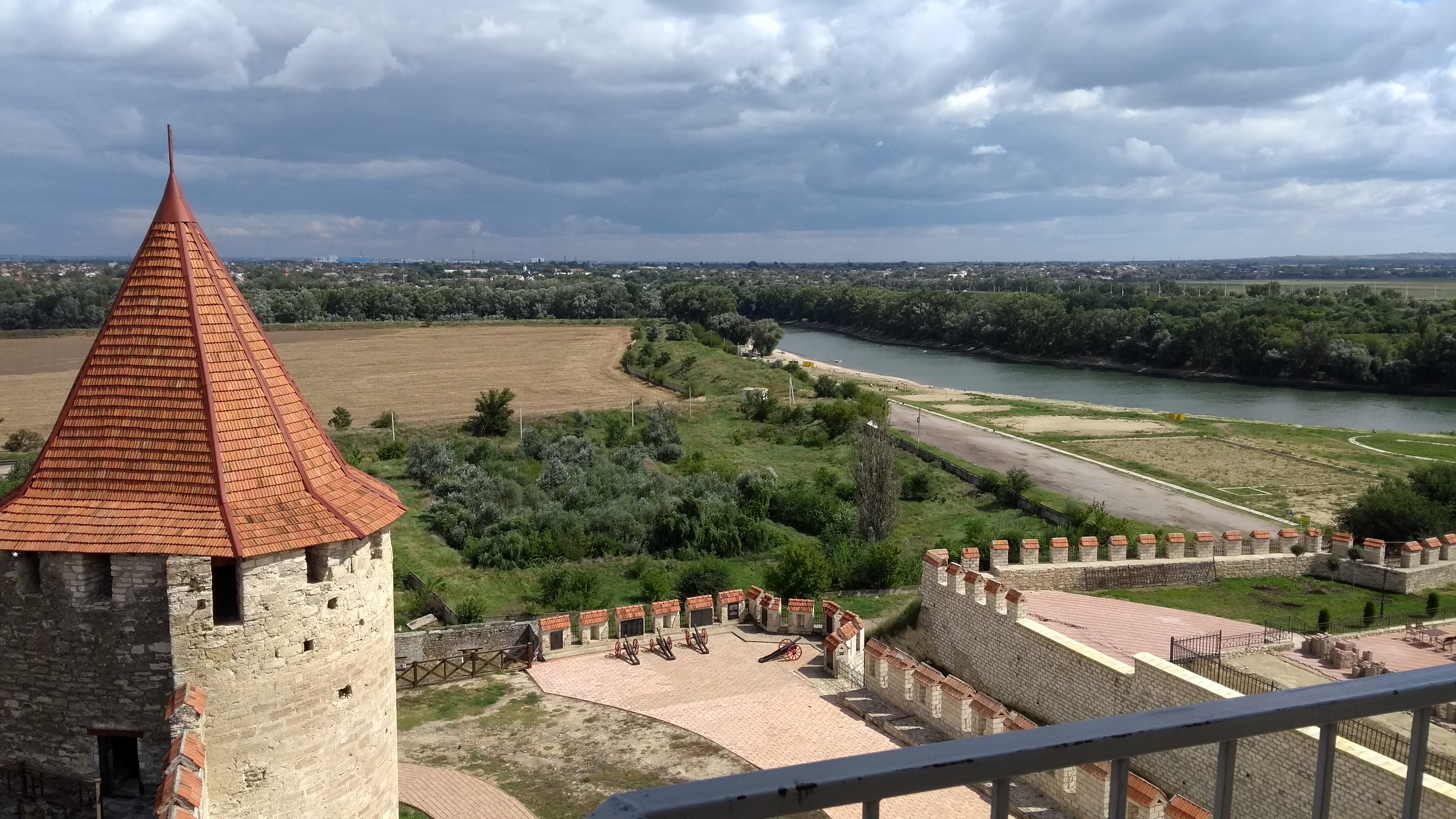
View over Dniester River

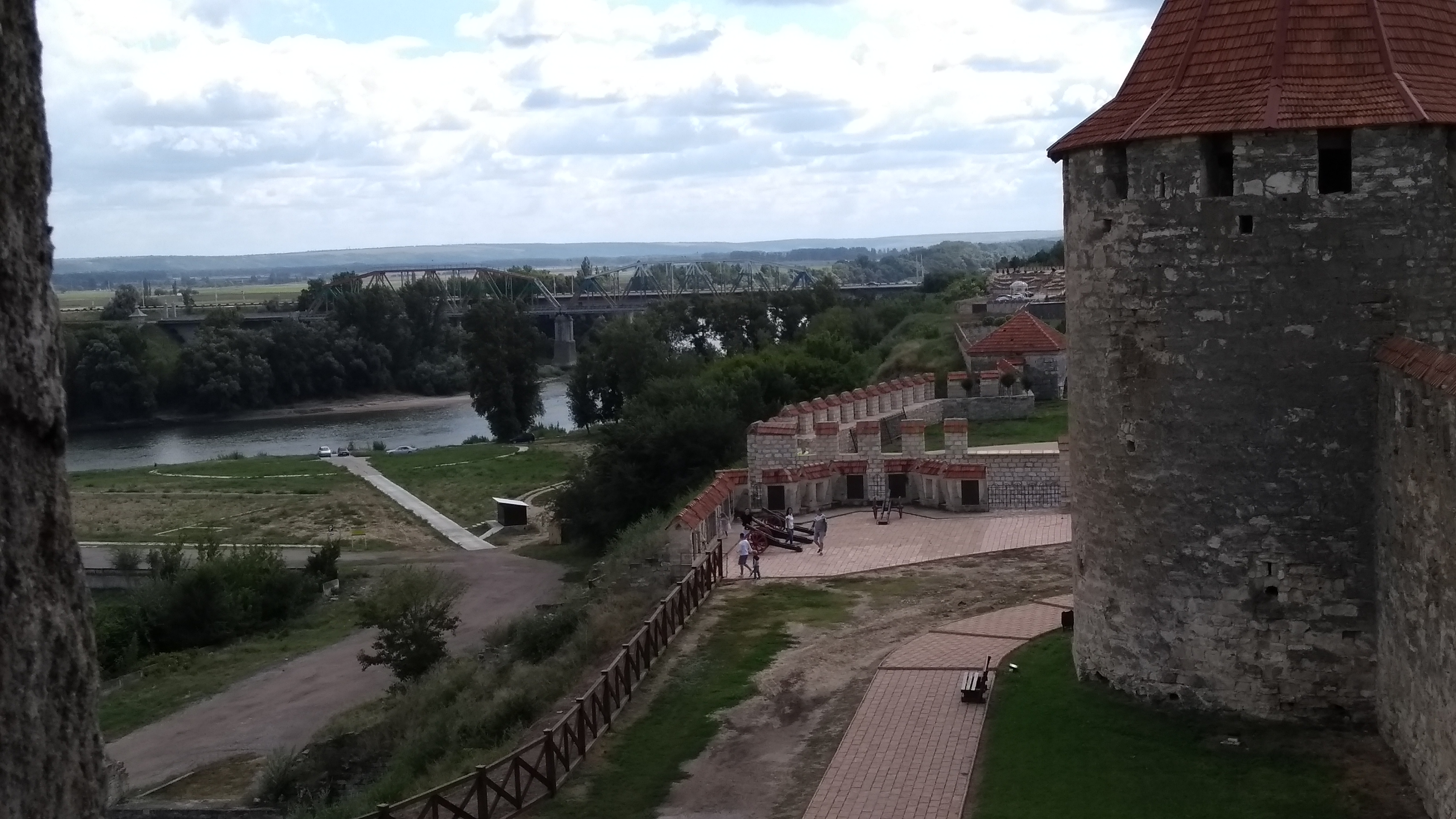
Bridge on Dniester River

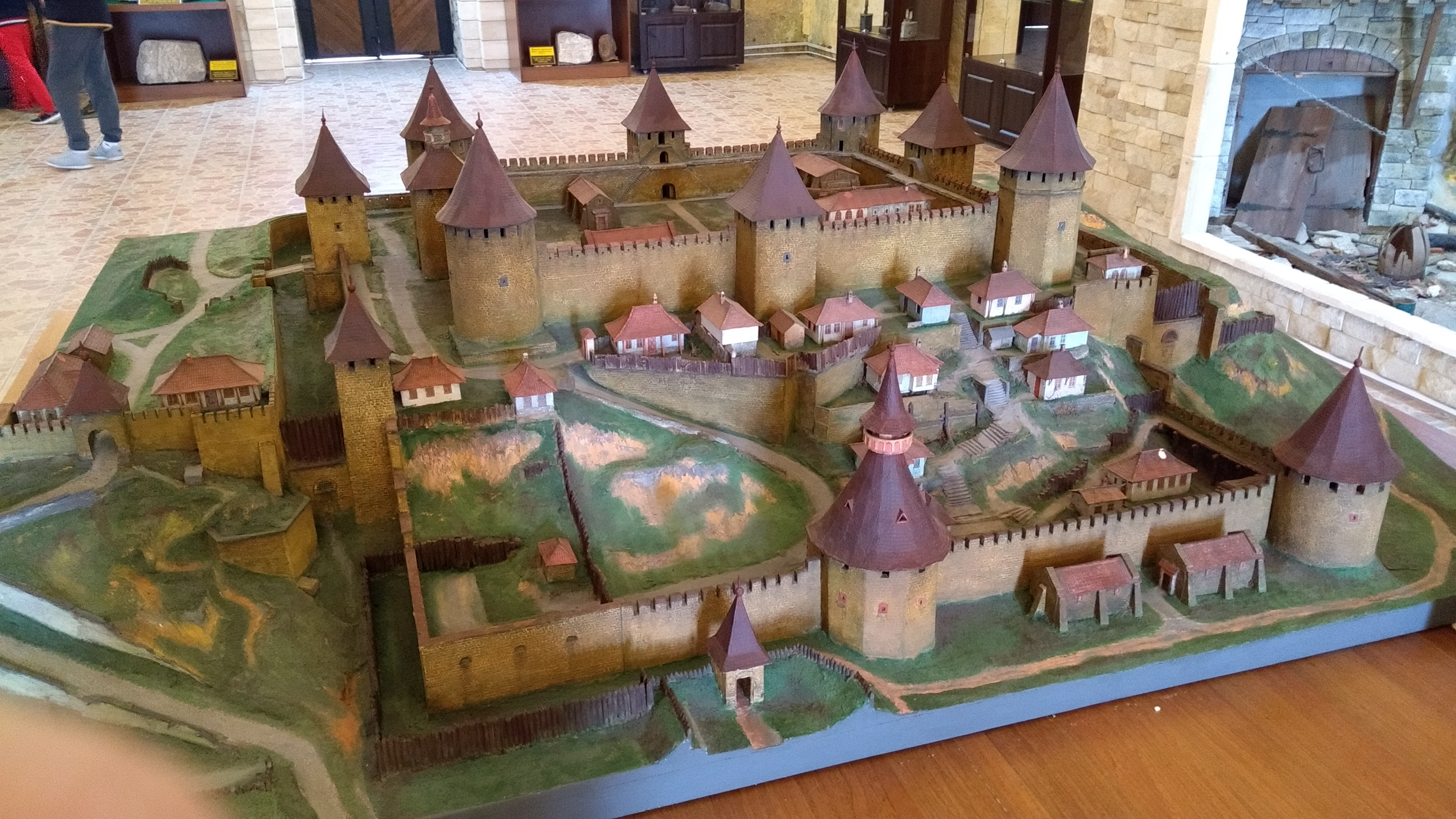
The model of fortifications as of 1790 in fortress museum

=== 2013 ===
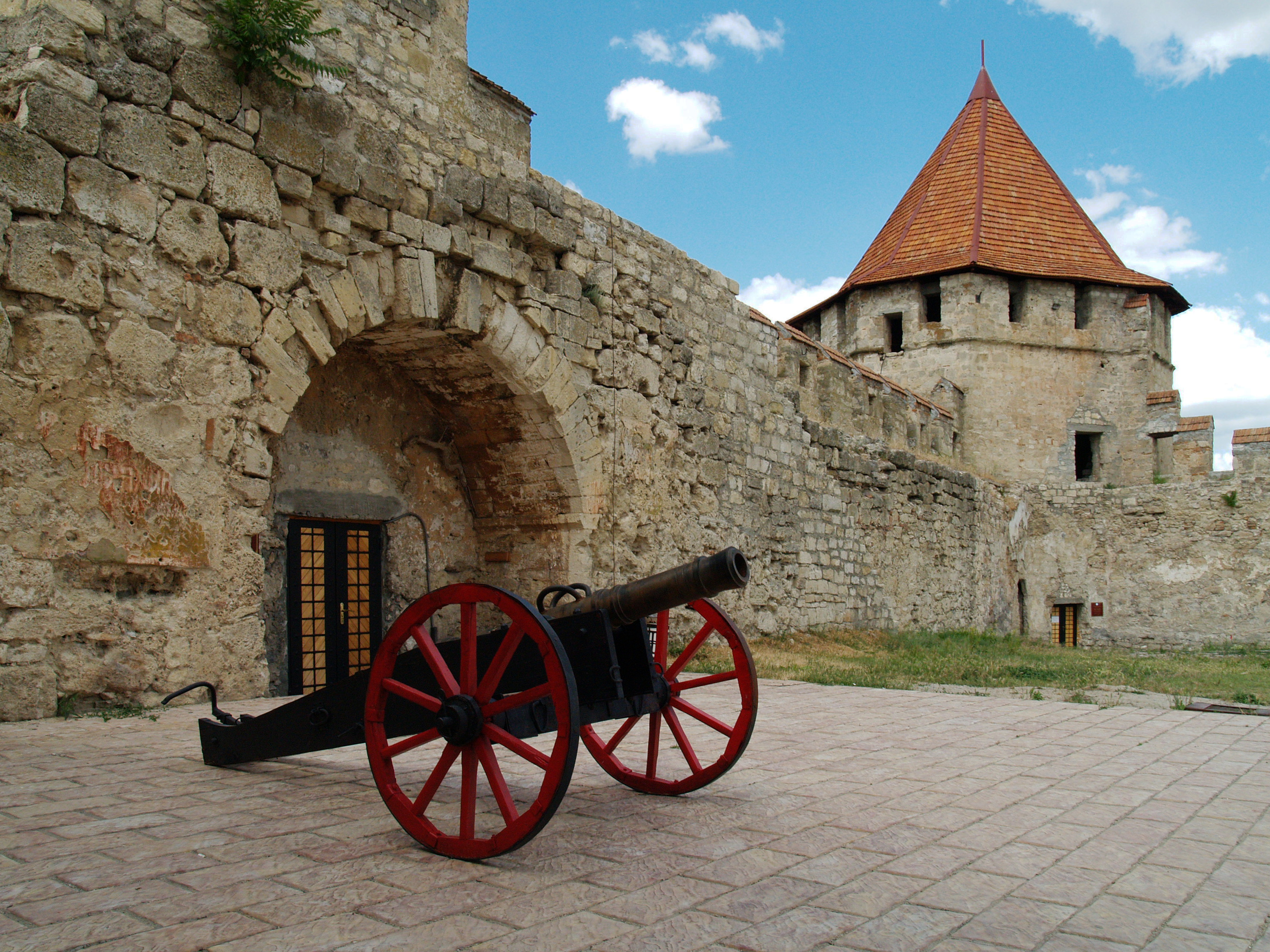
Northern wall

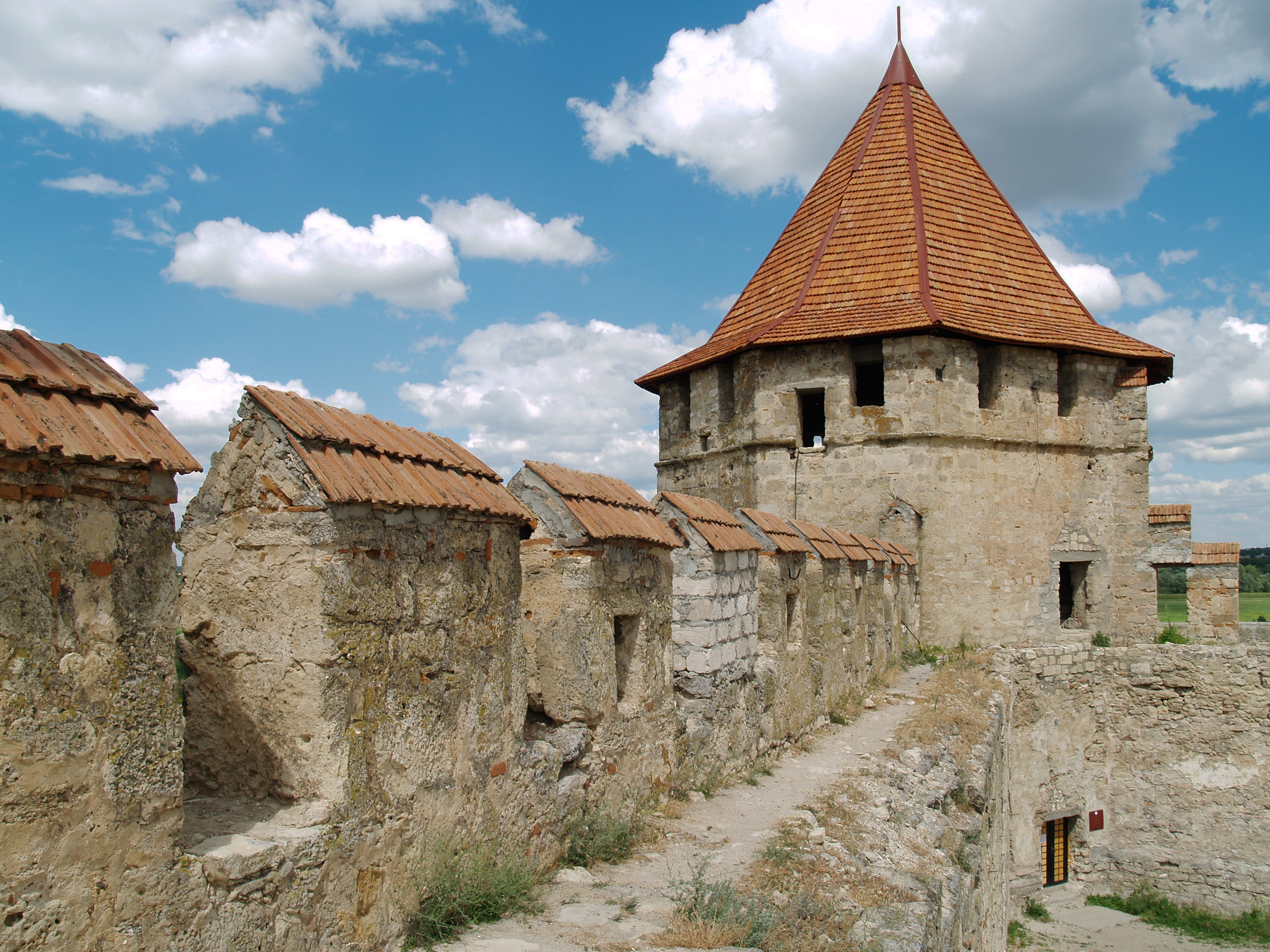
Northern wall

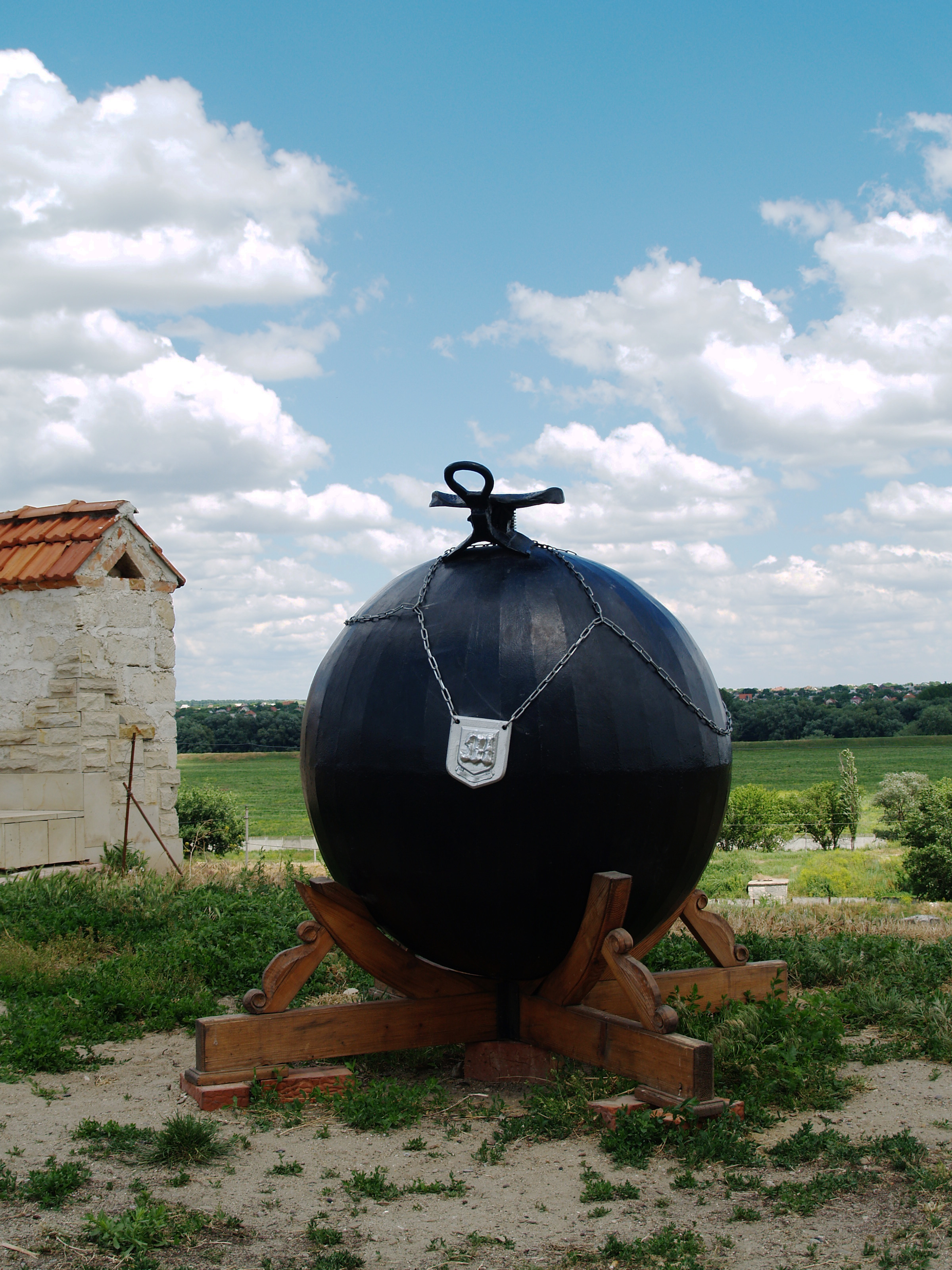

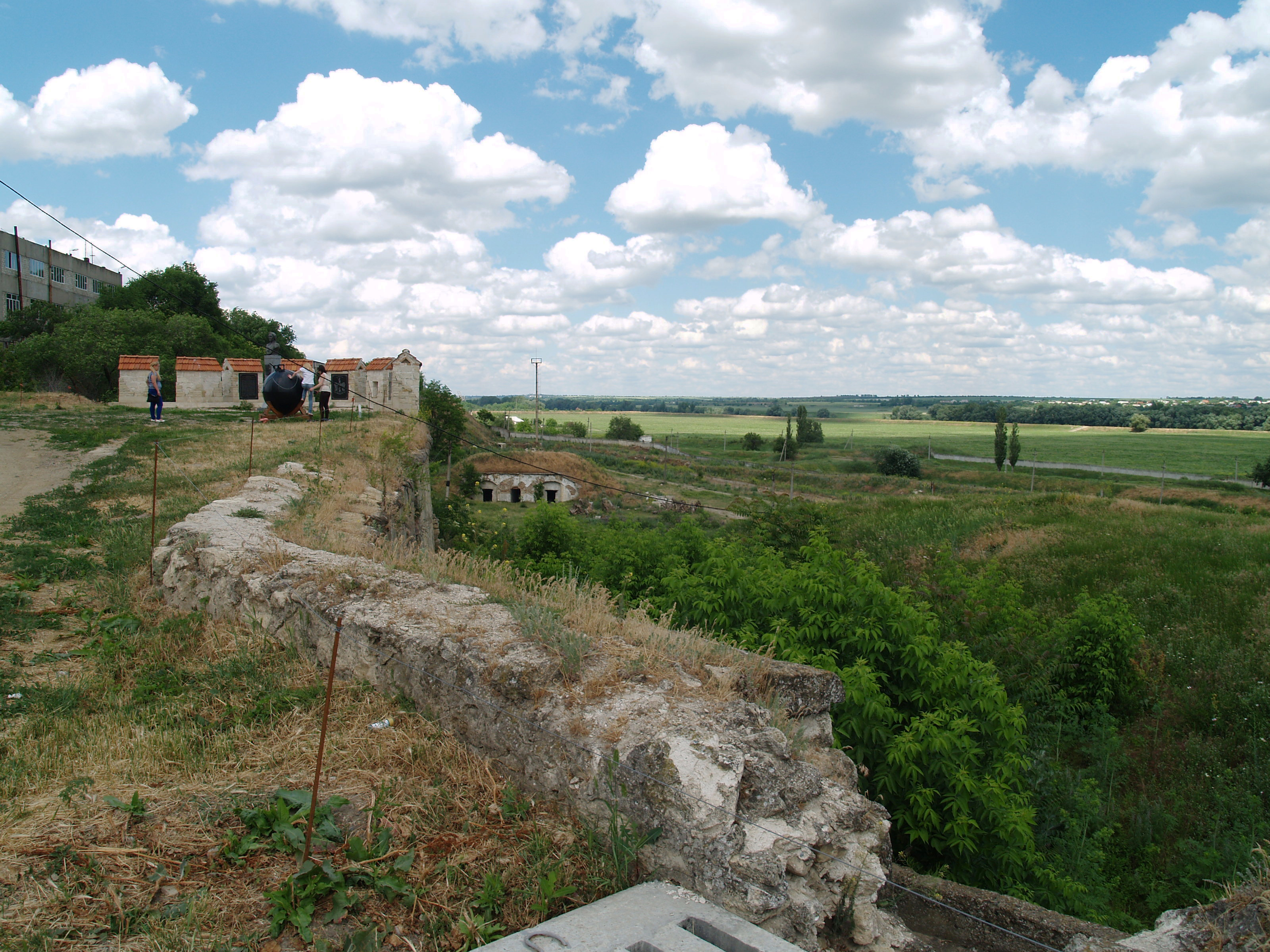

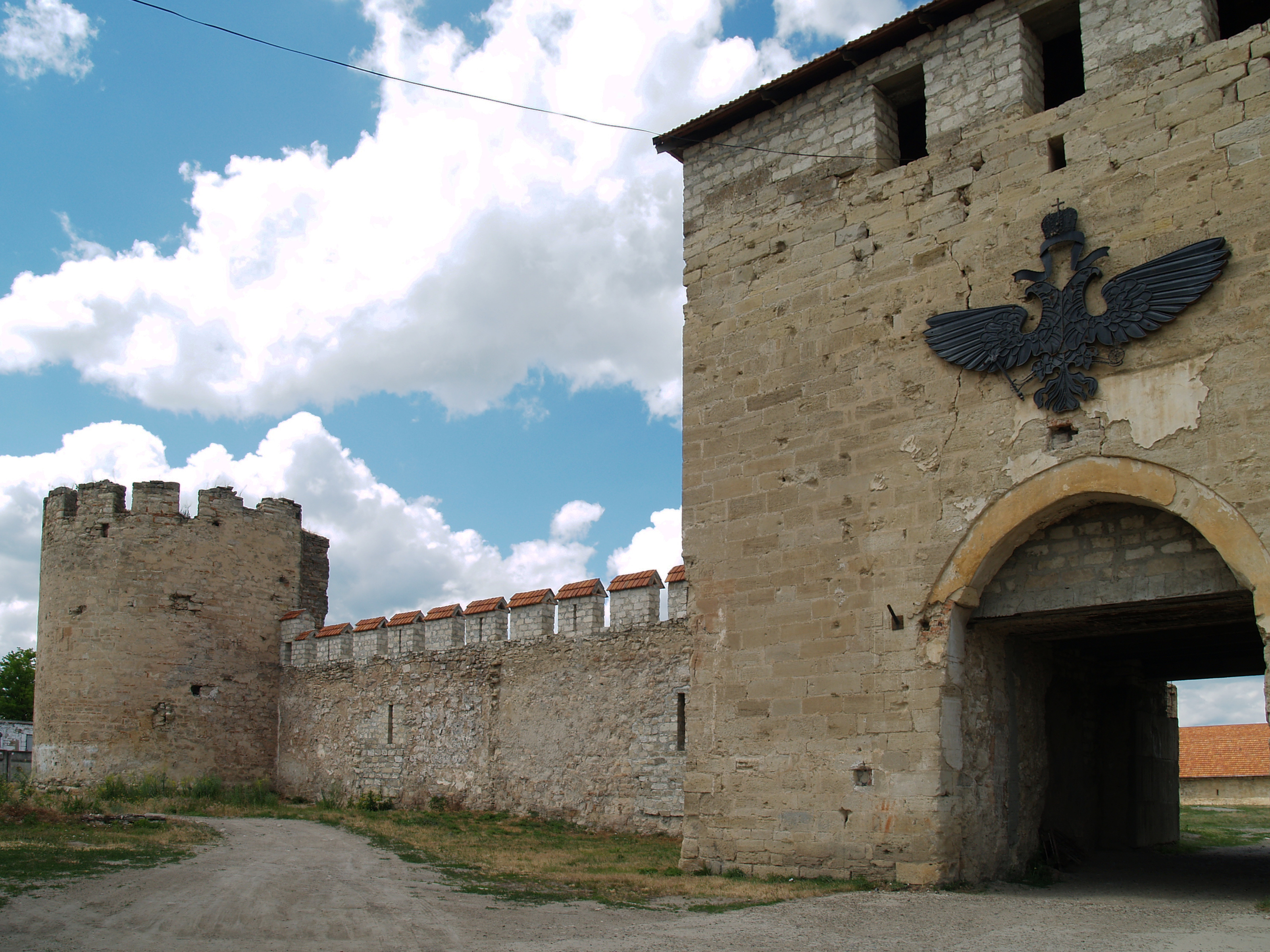
Southern wall

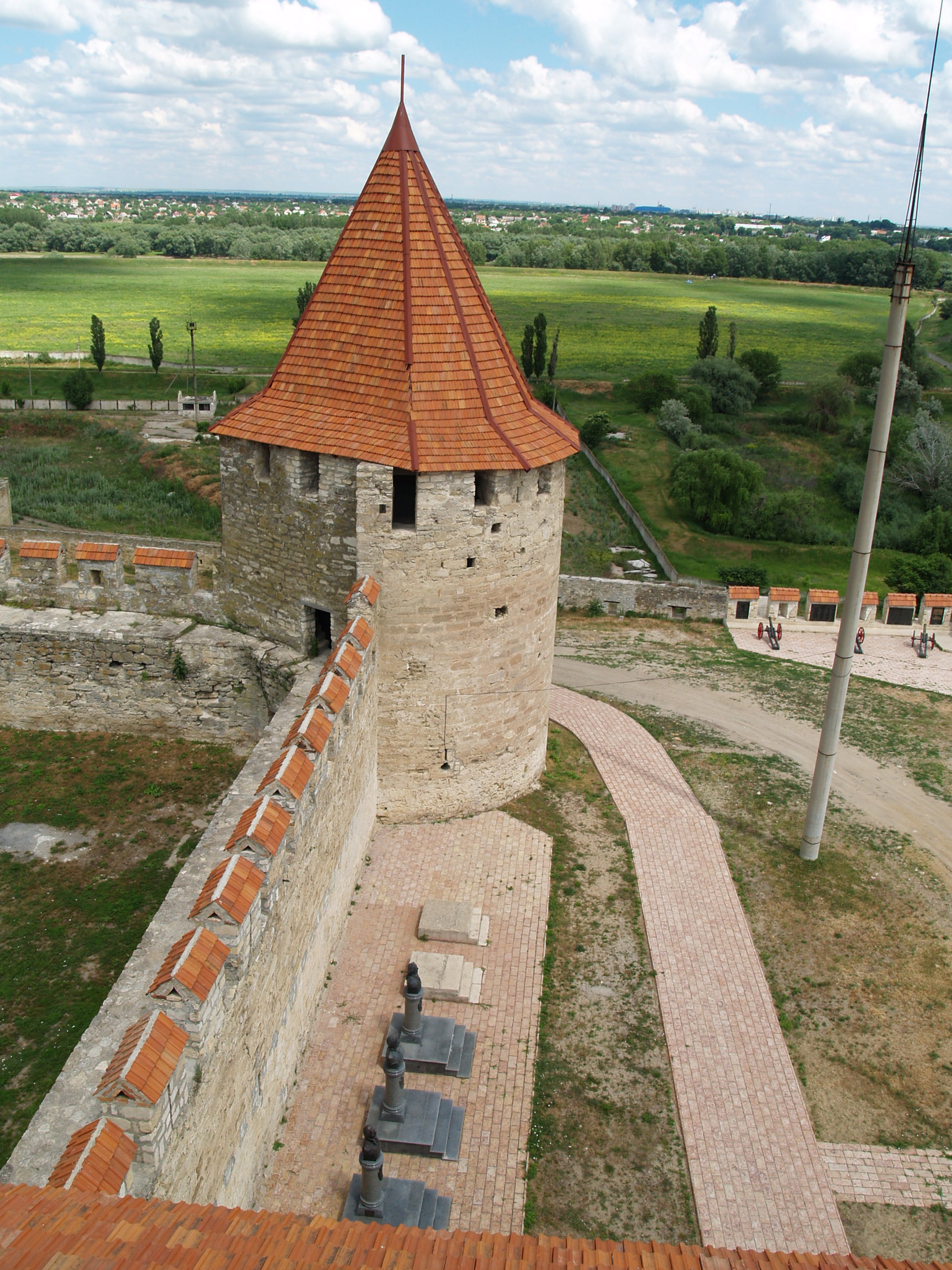

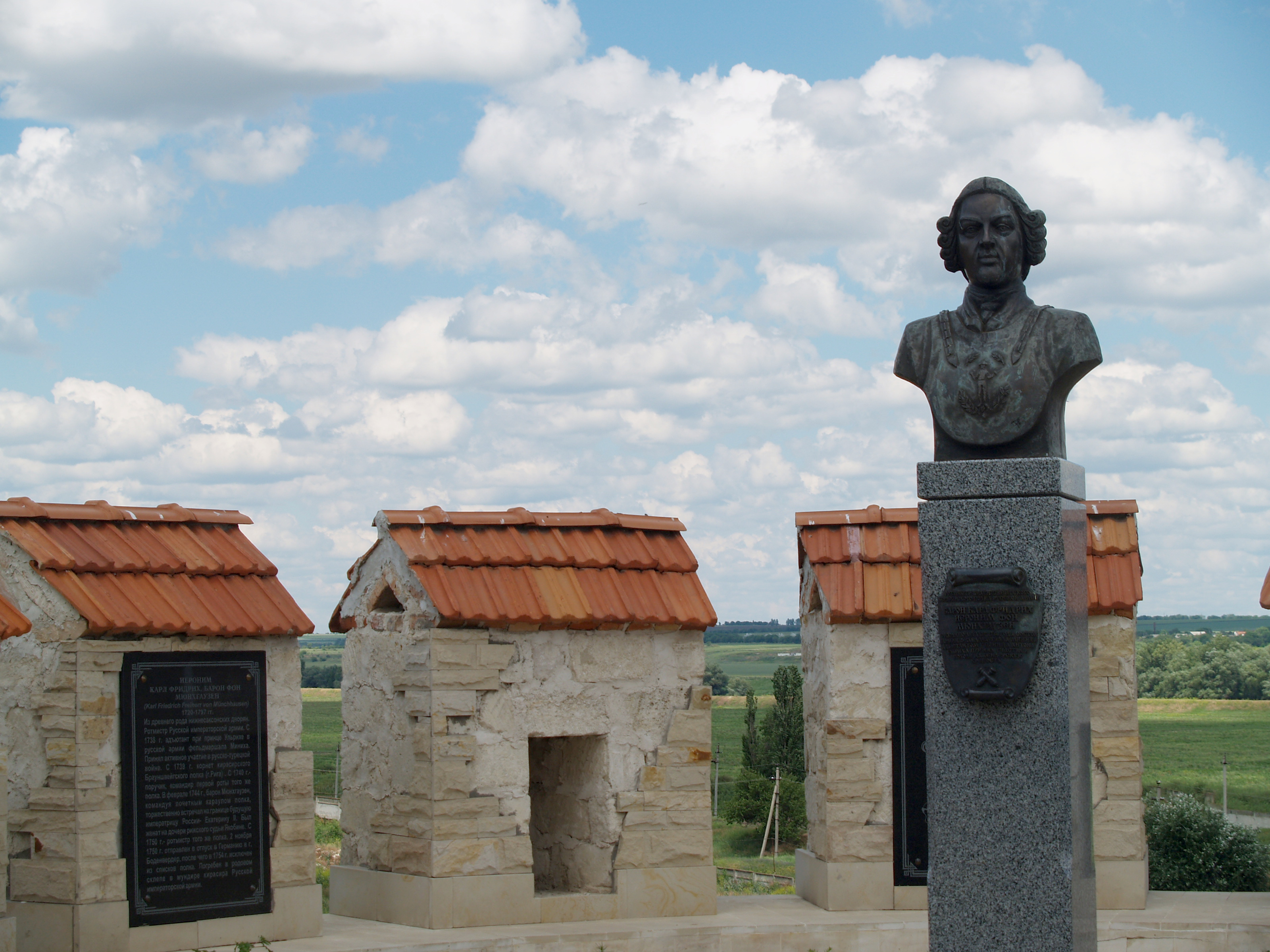
The bust of Baron Munchausen

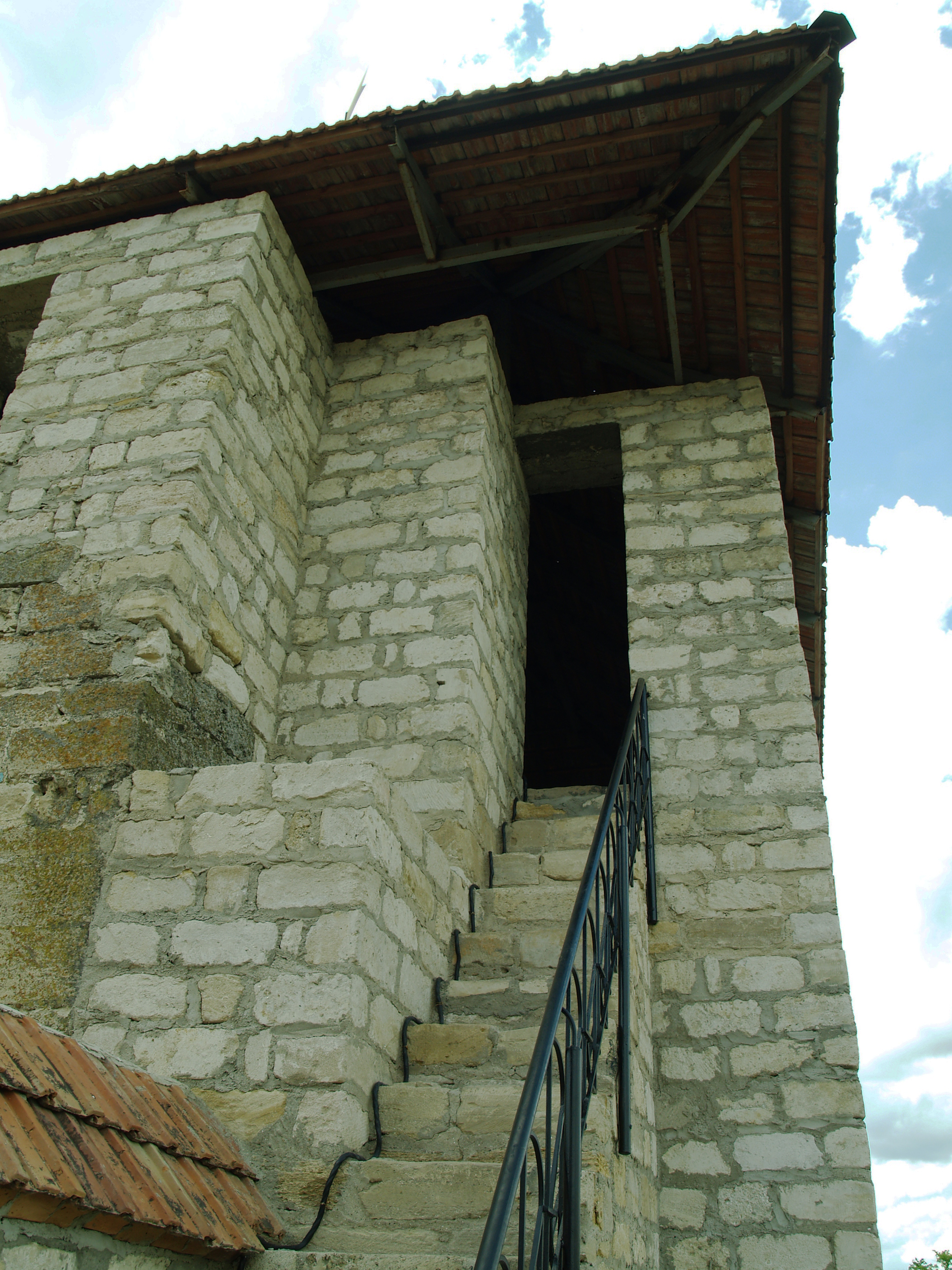
Tower on southern side (rebuilt)

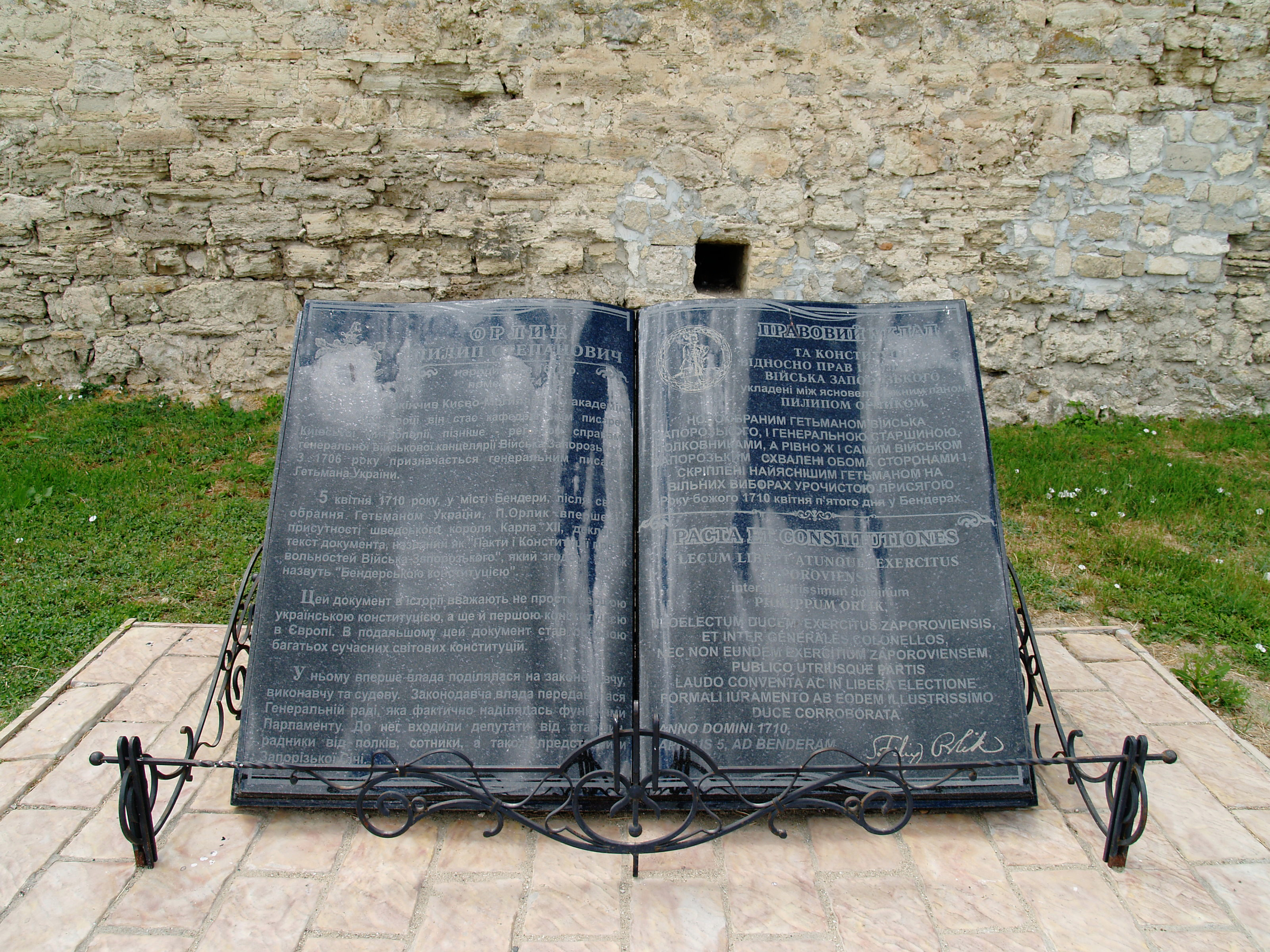

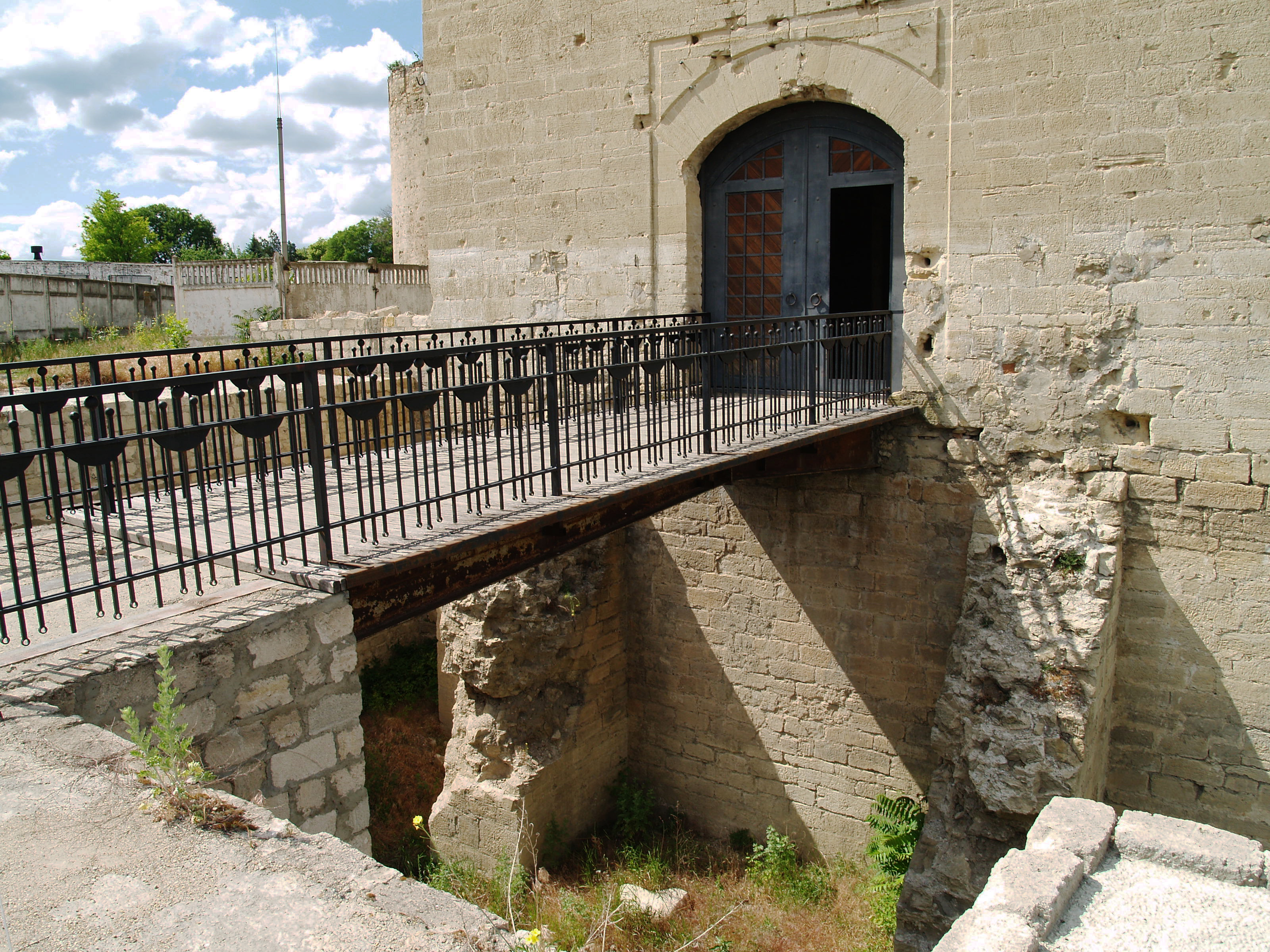

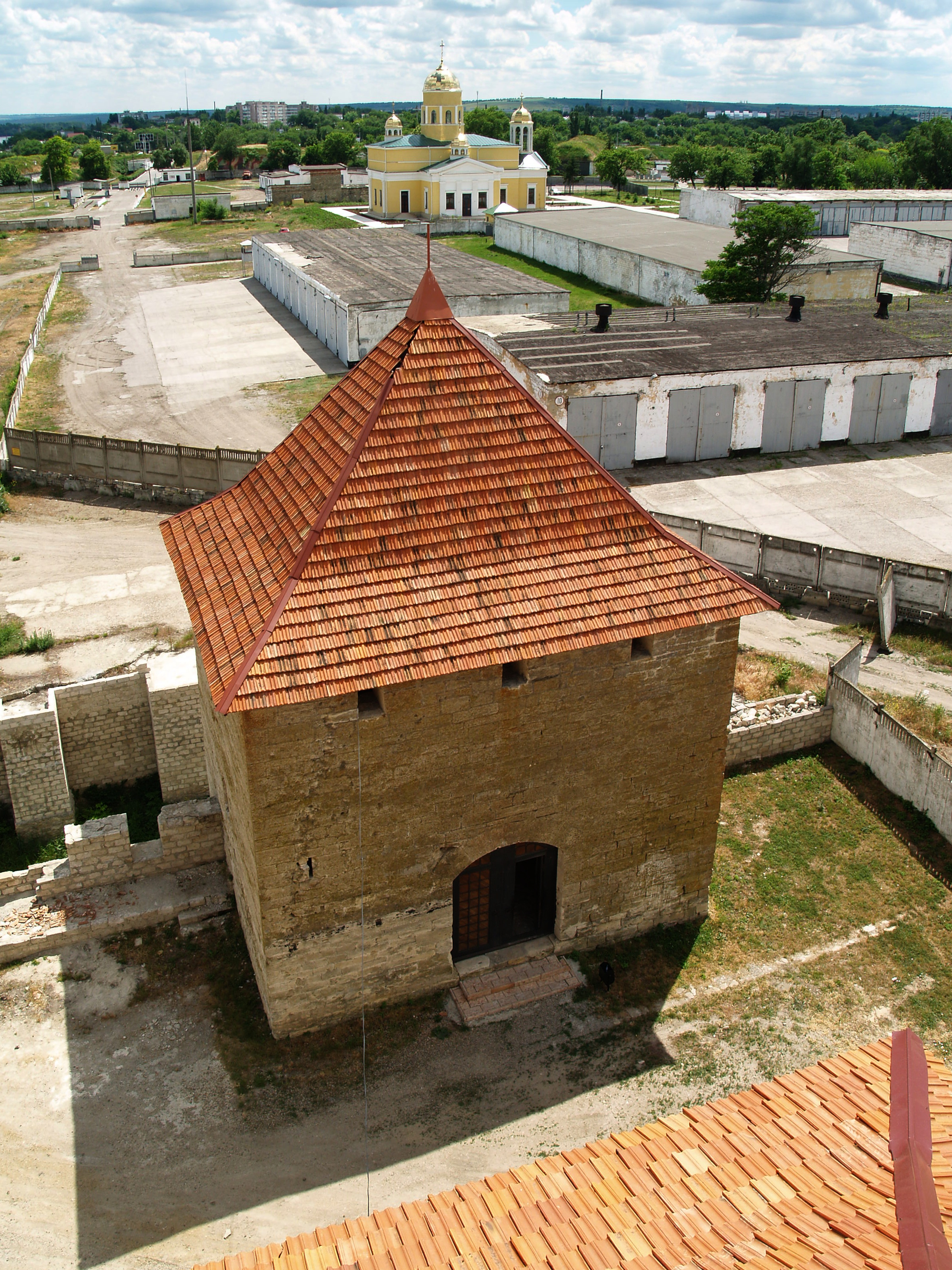

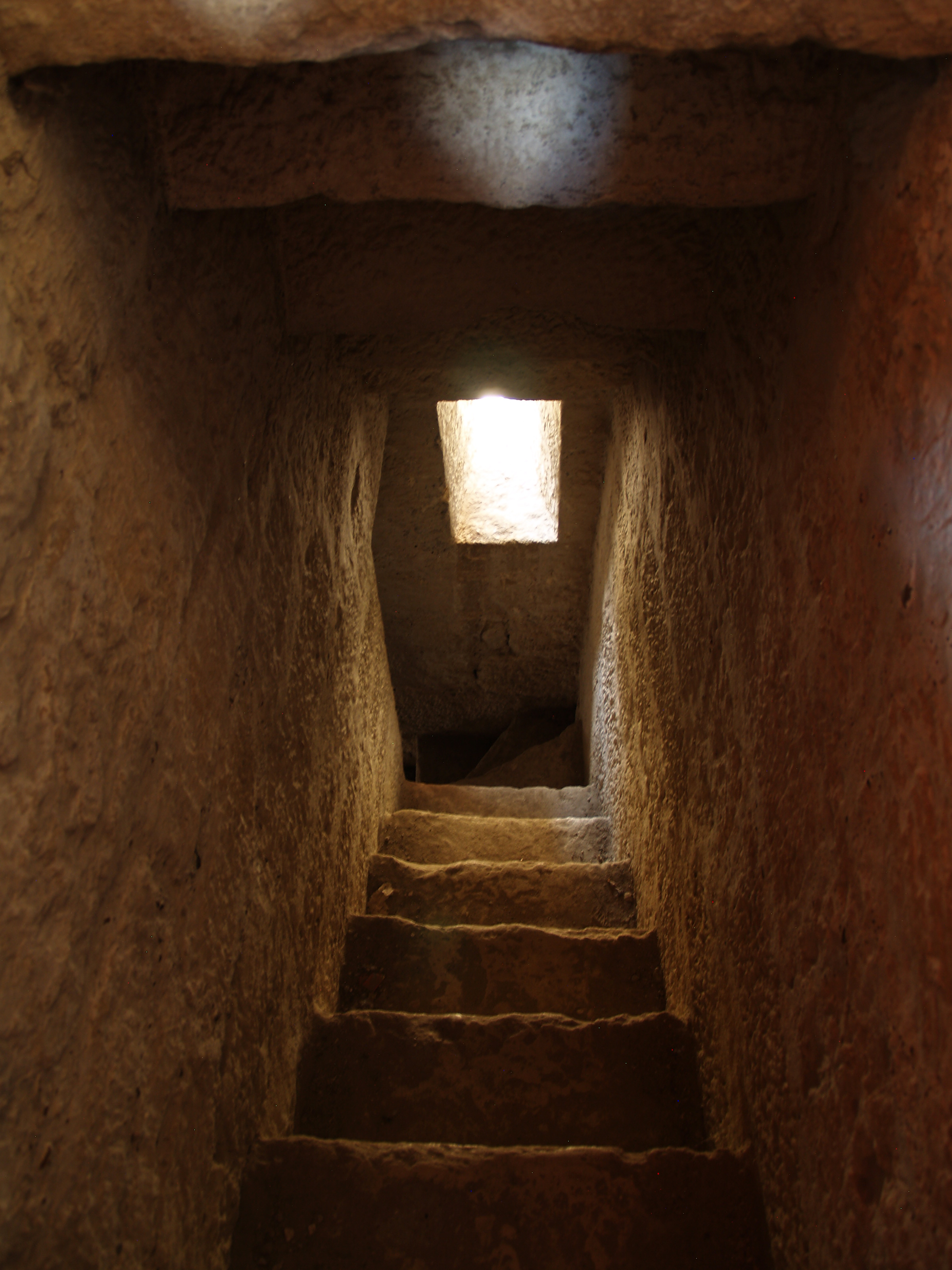

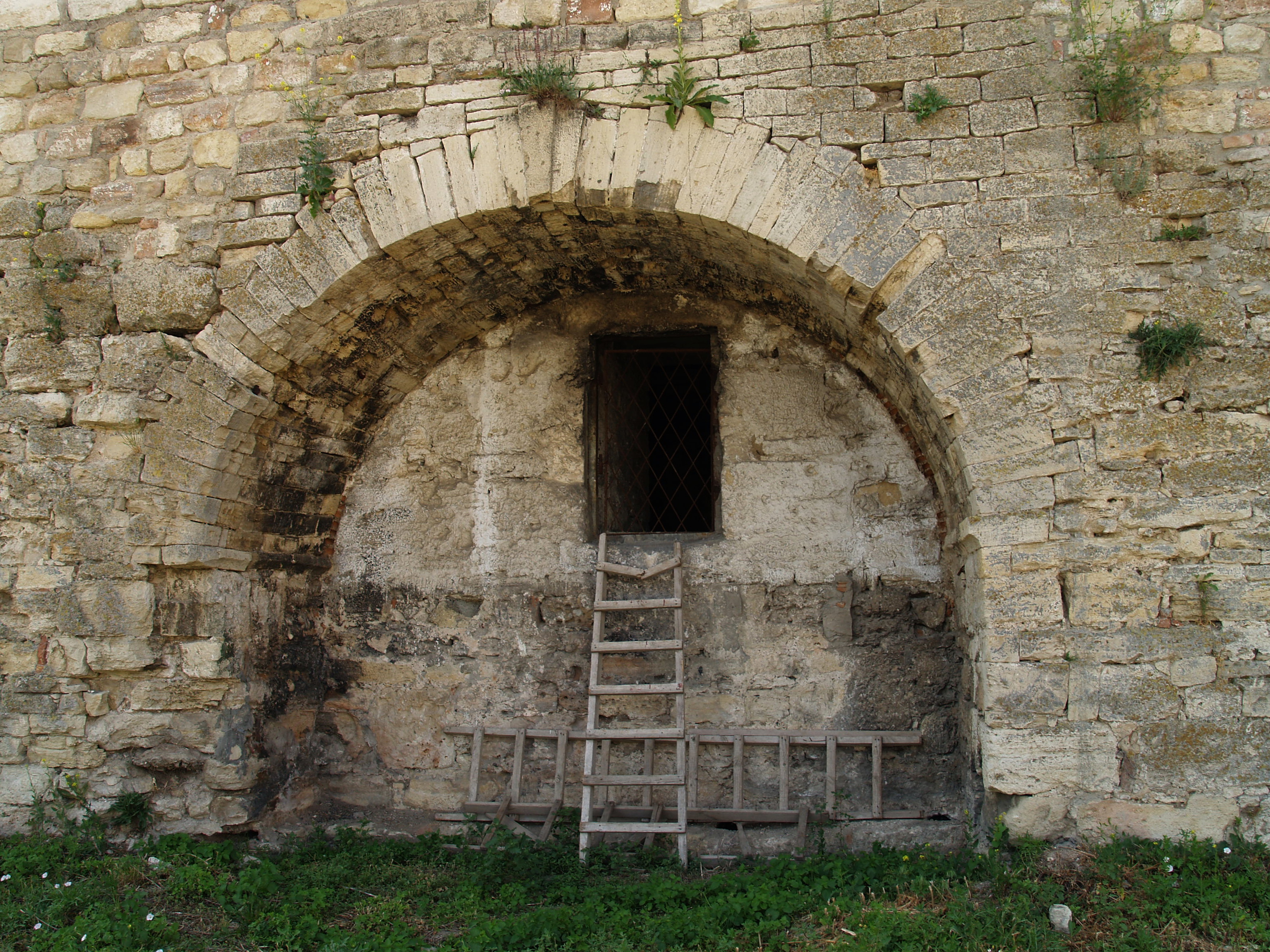

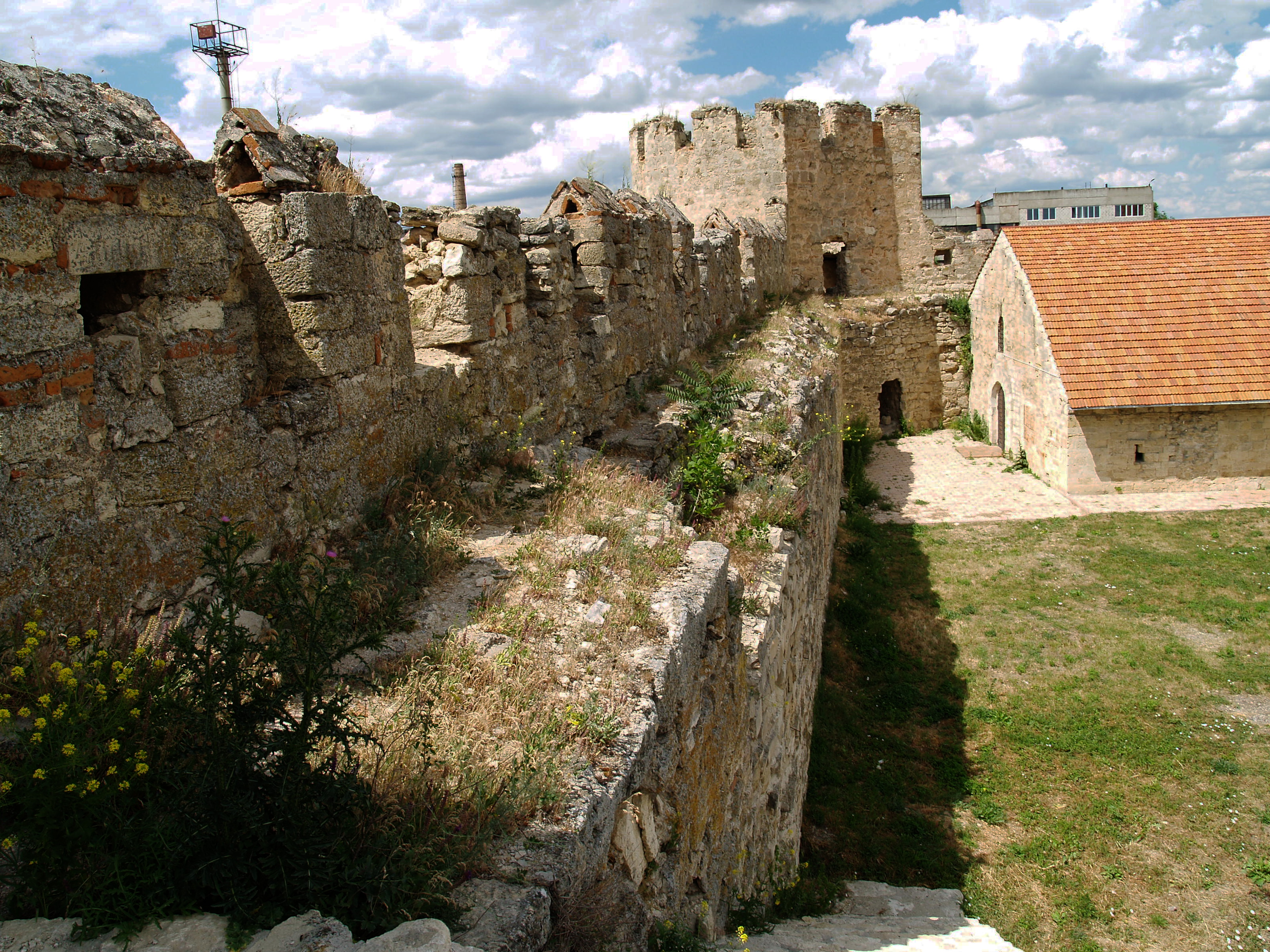

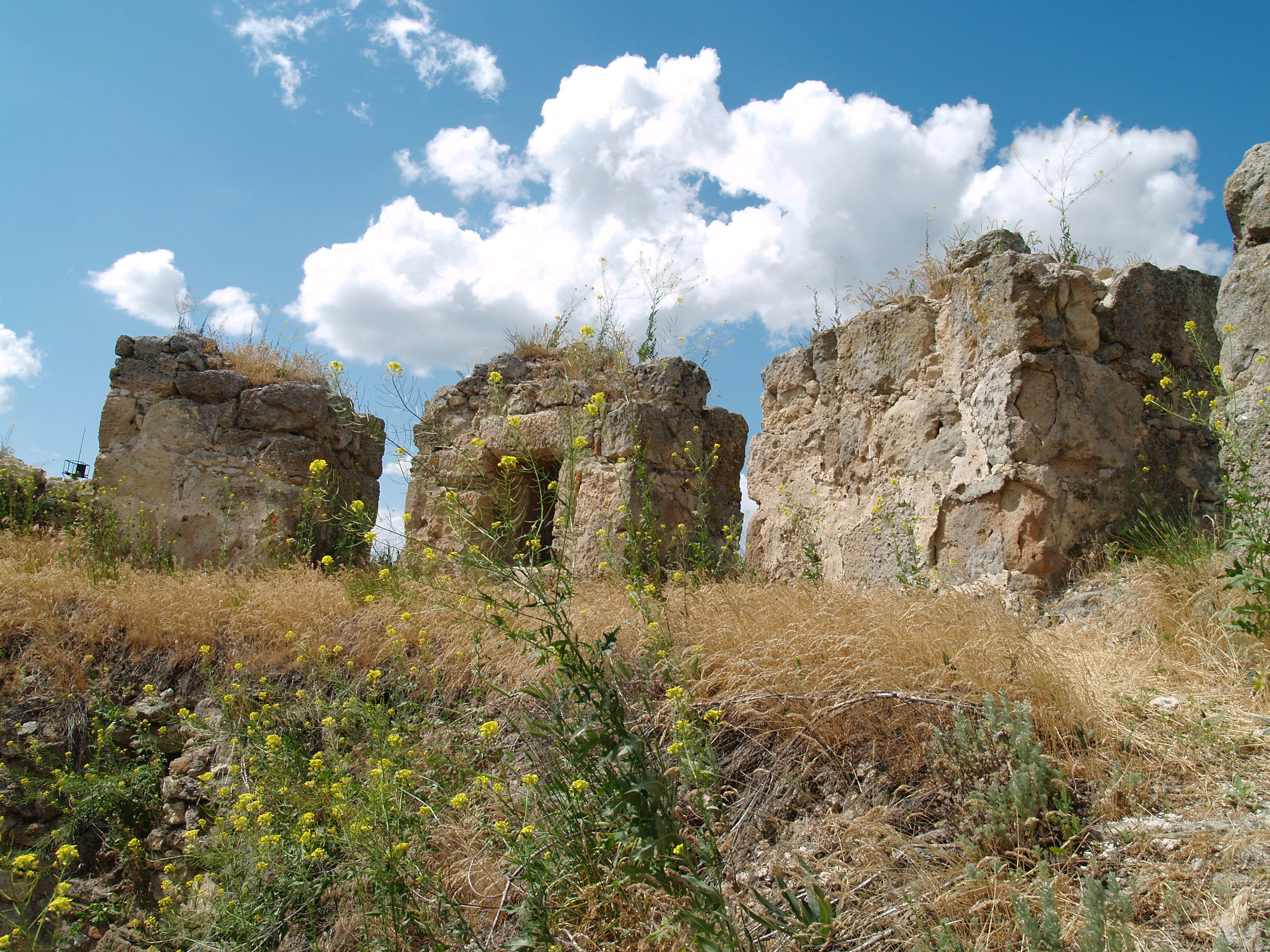

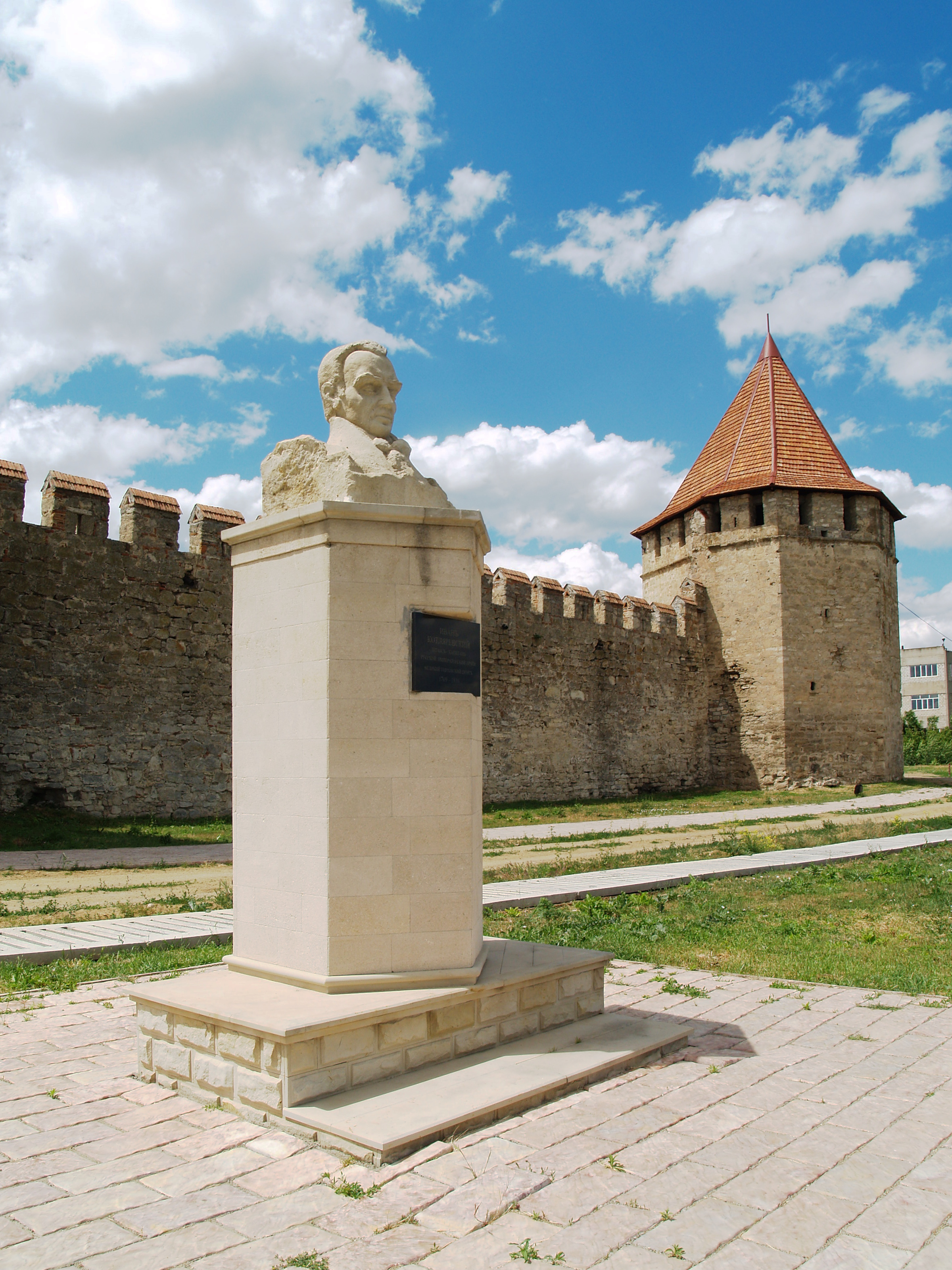
The bust of Ivan Kotliarevsky

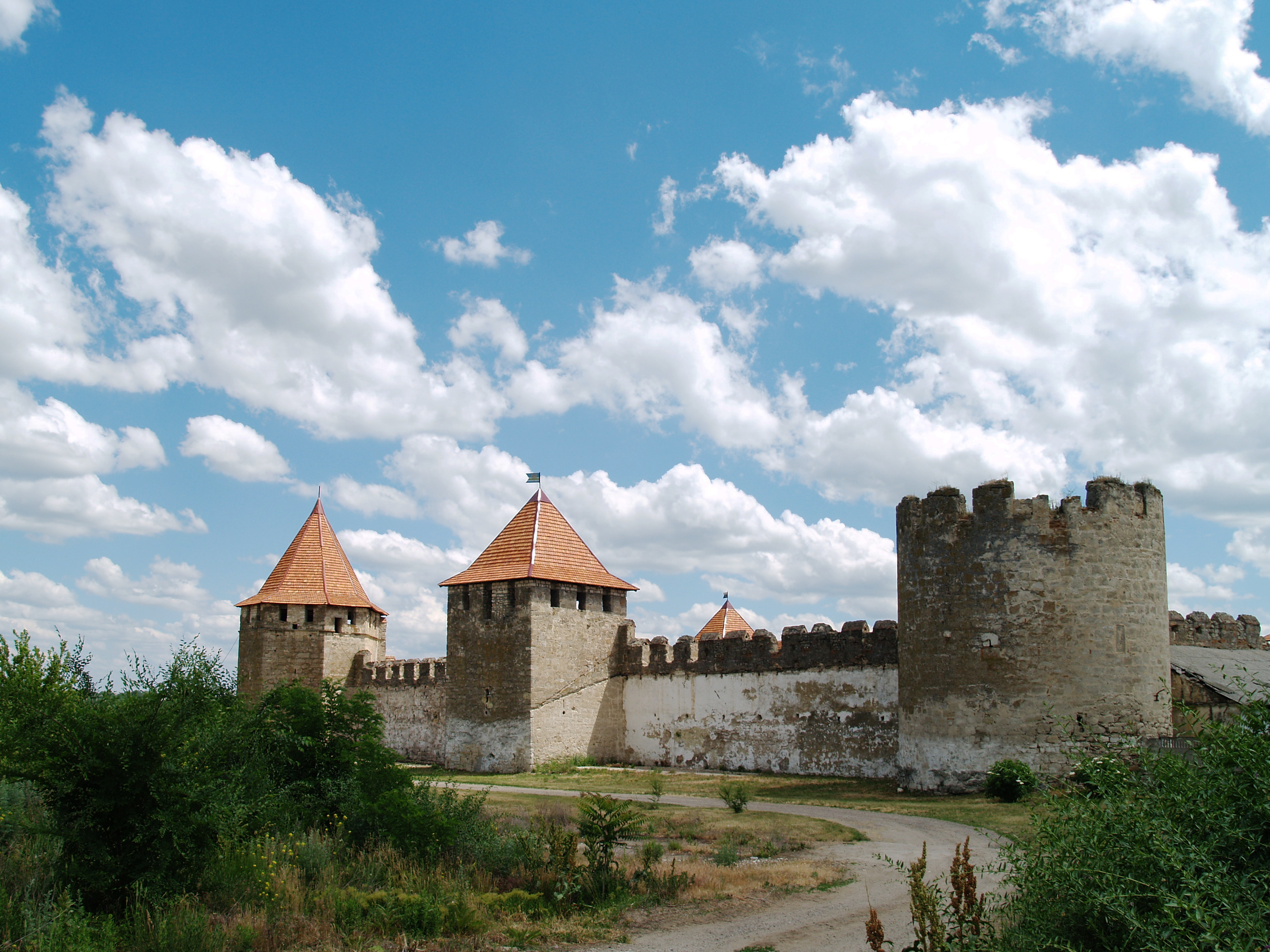

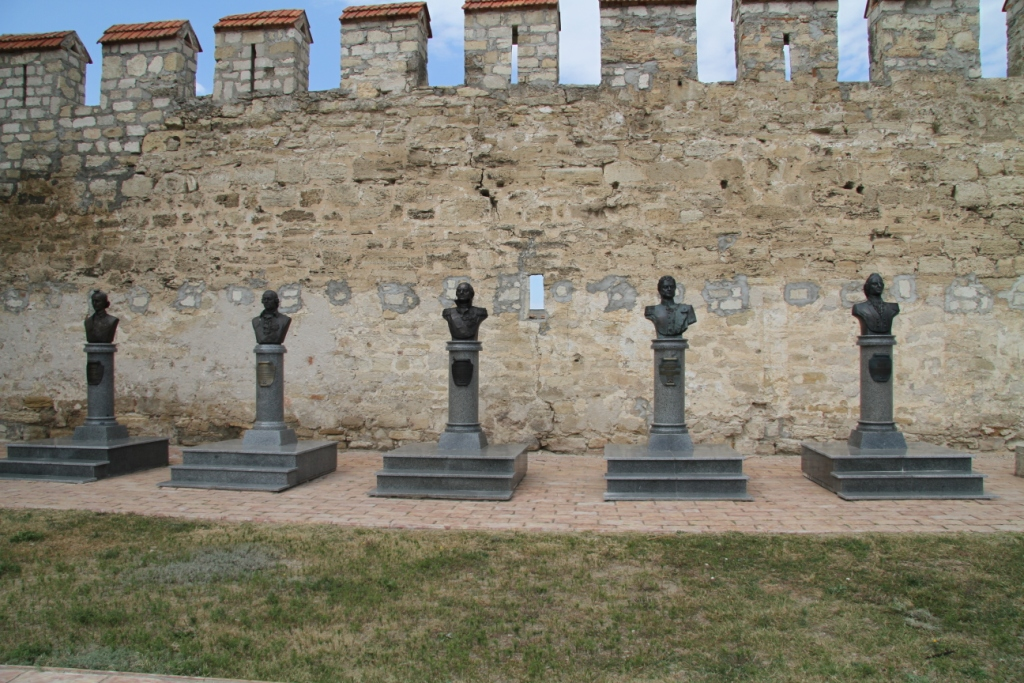

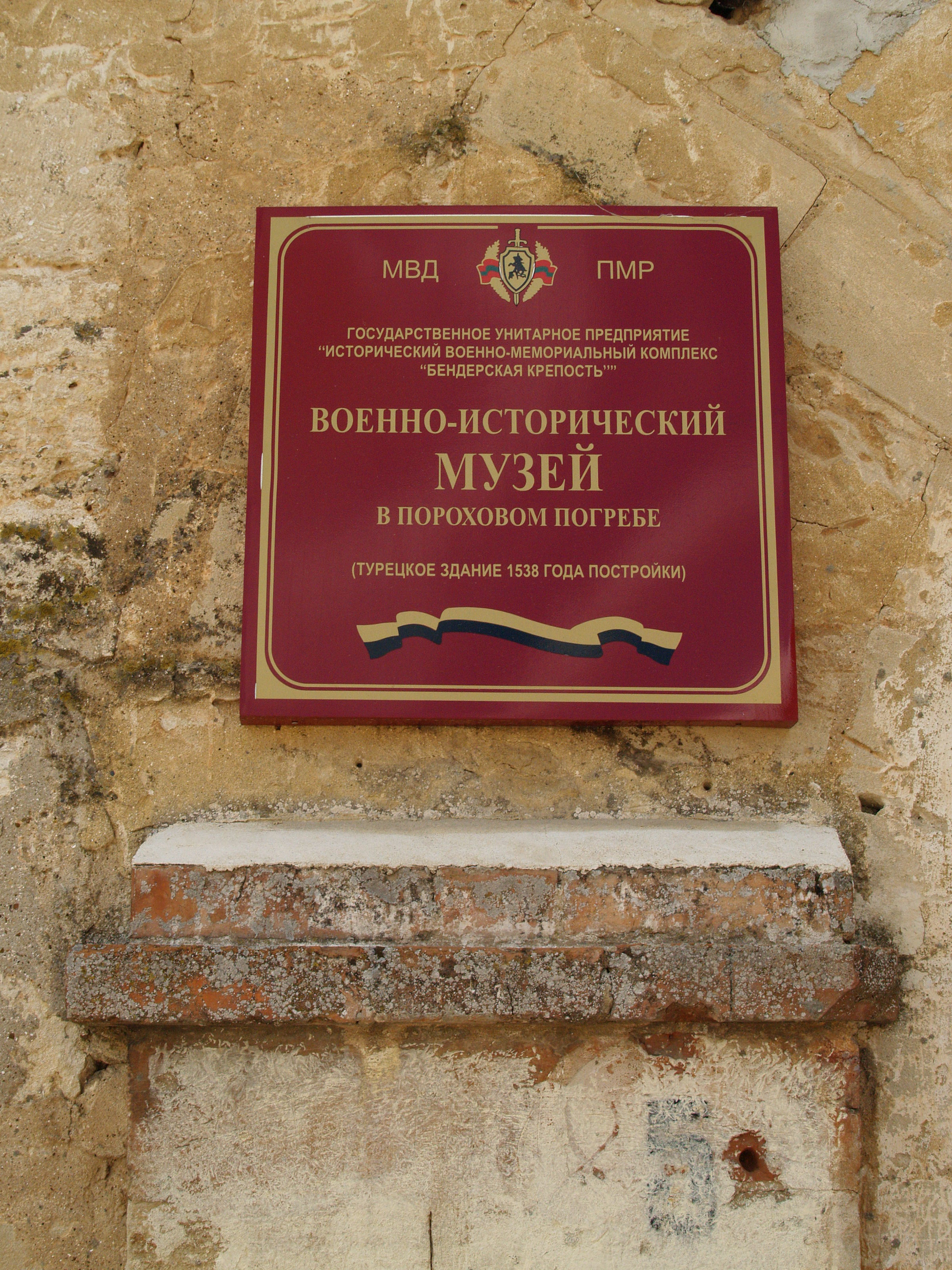

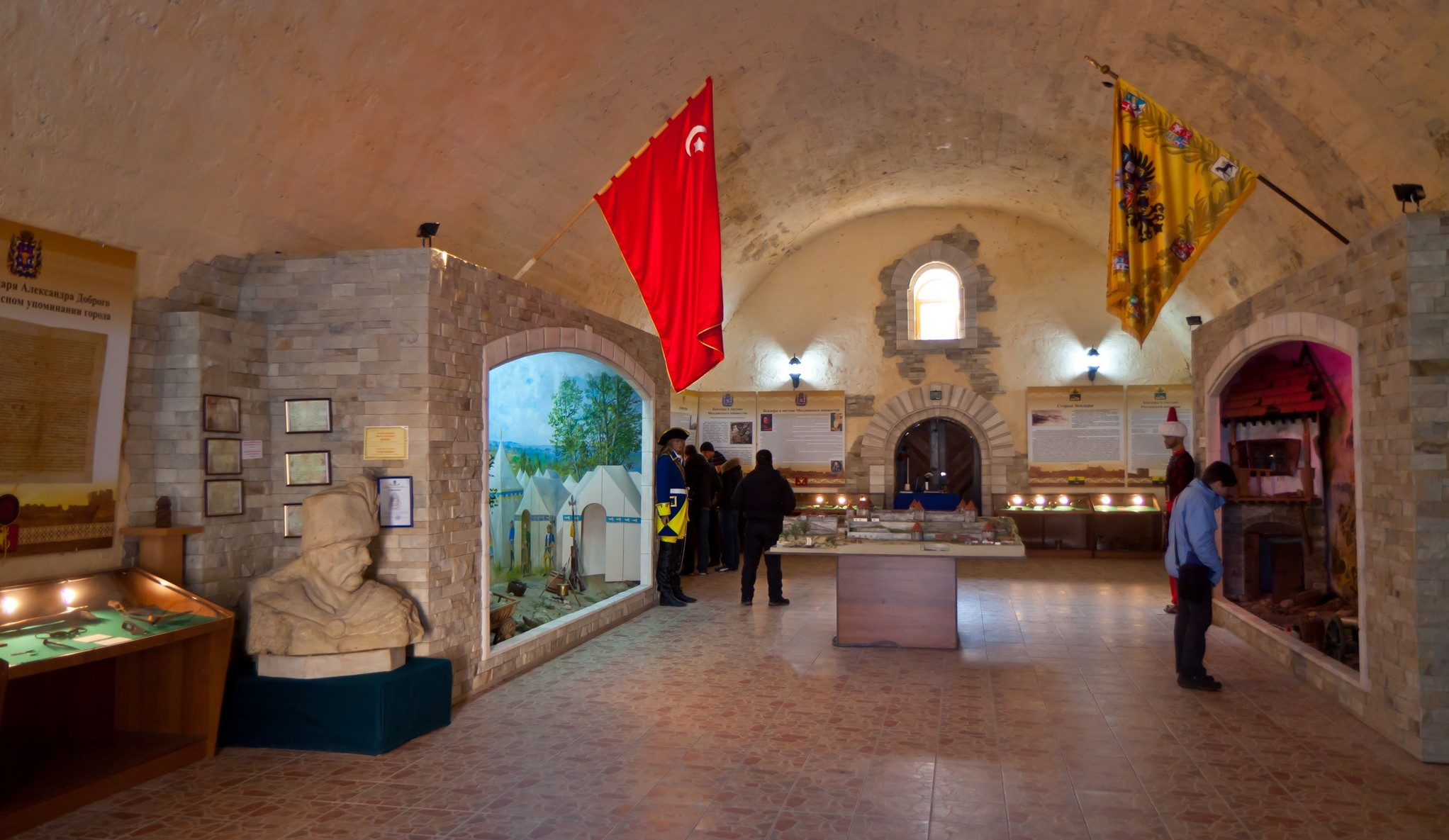
Fortress' museum

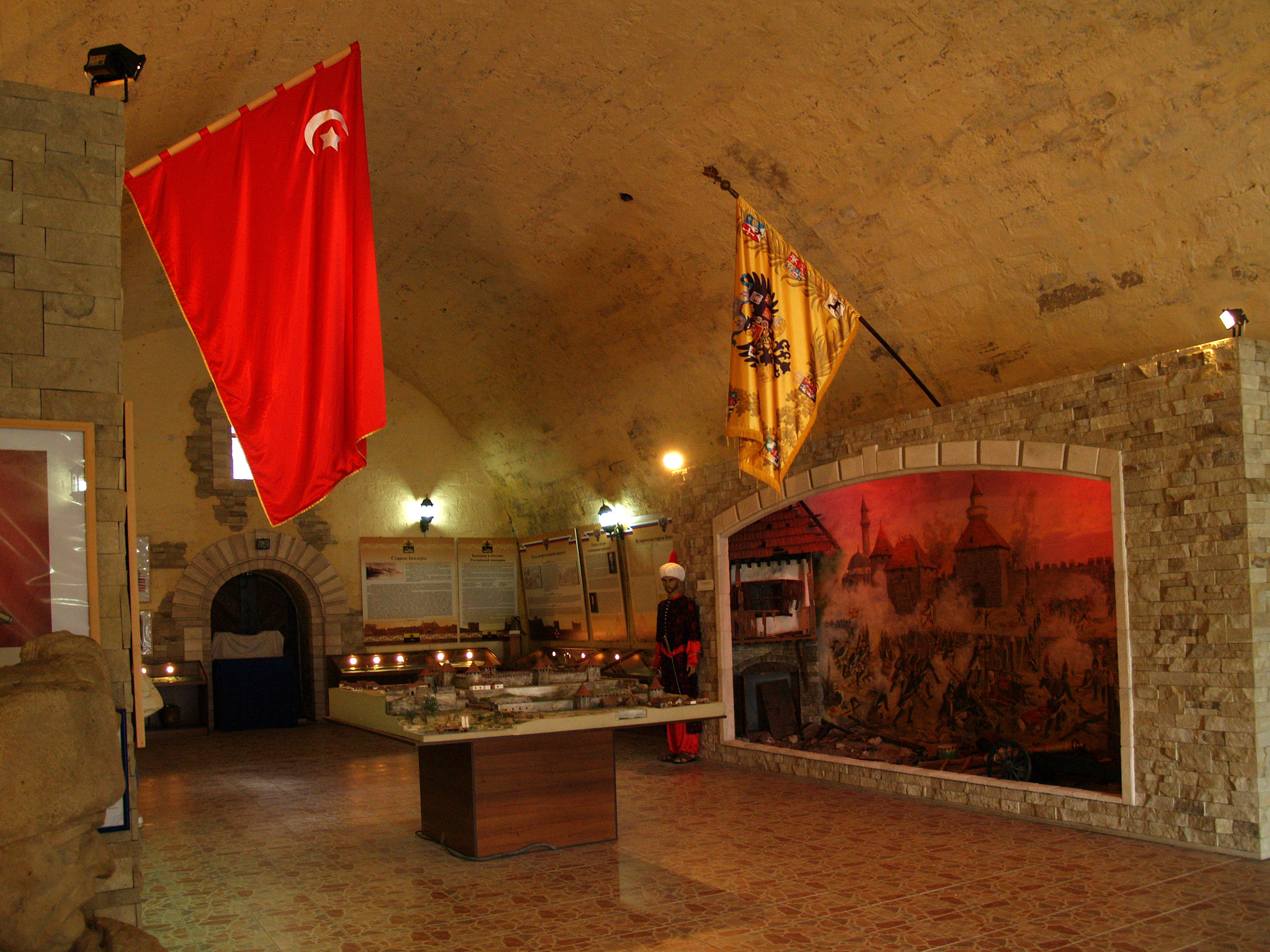

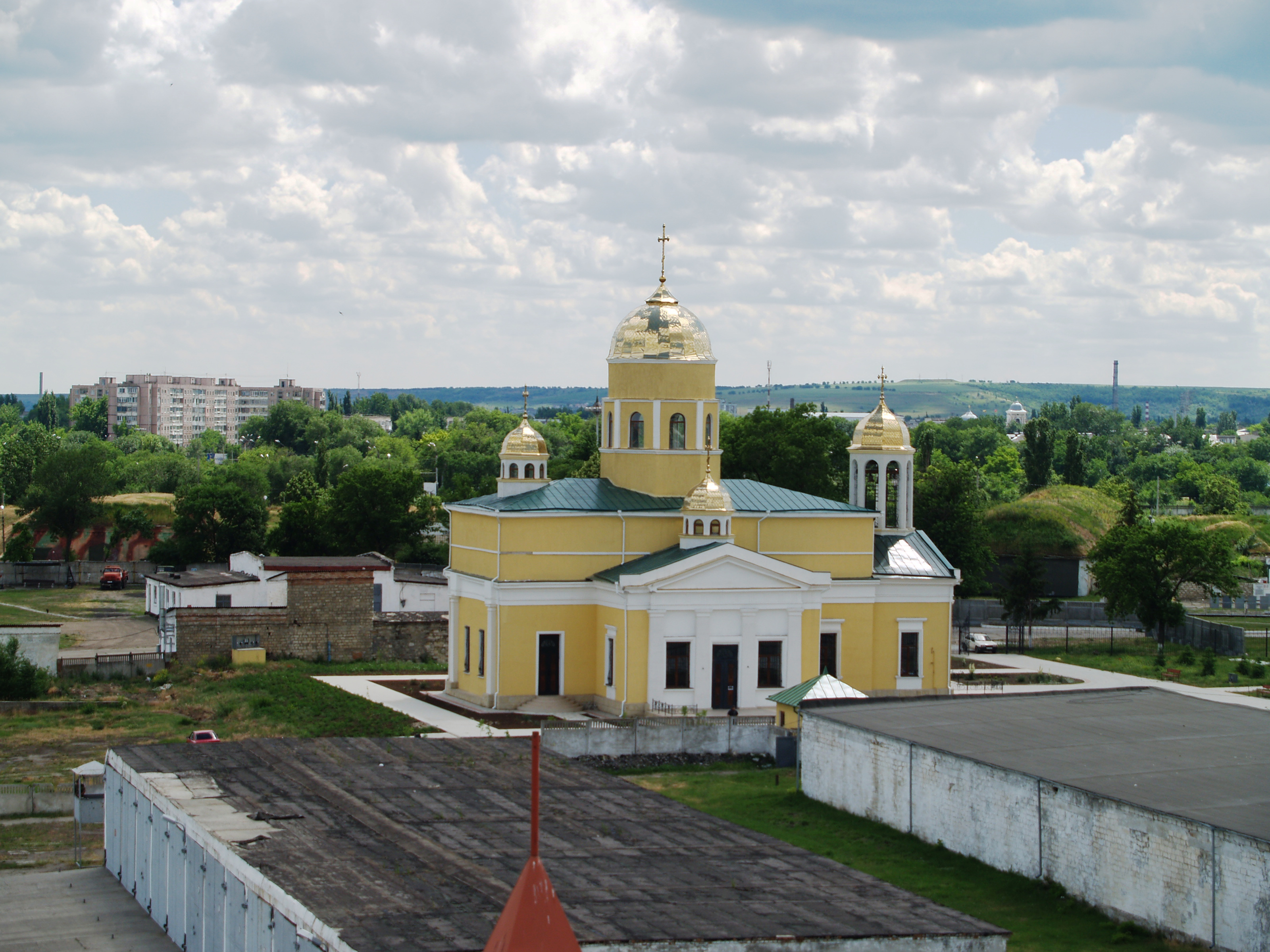
The church Alexander Nevsky in the fortress

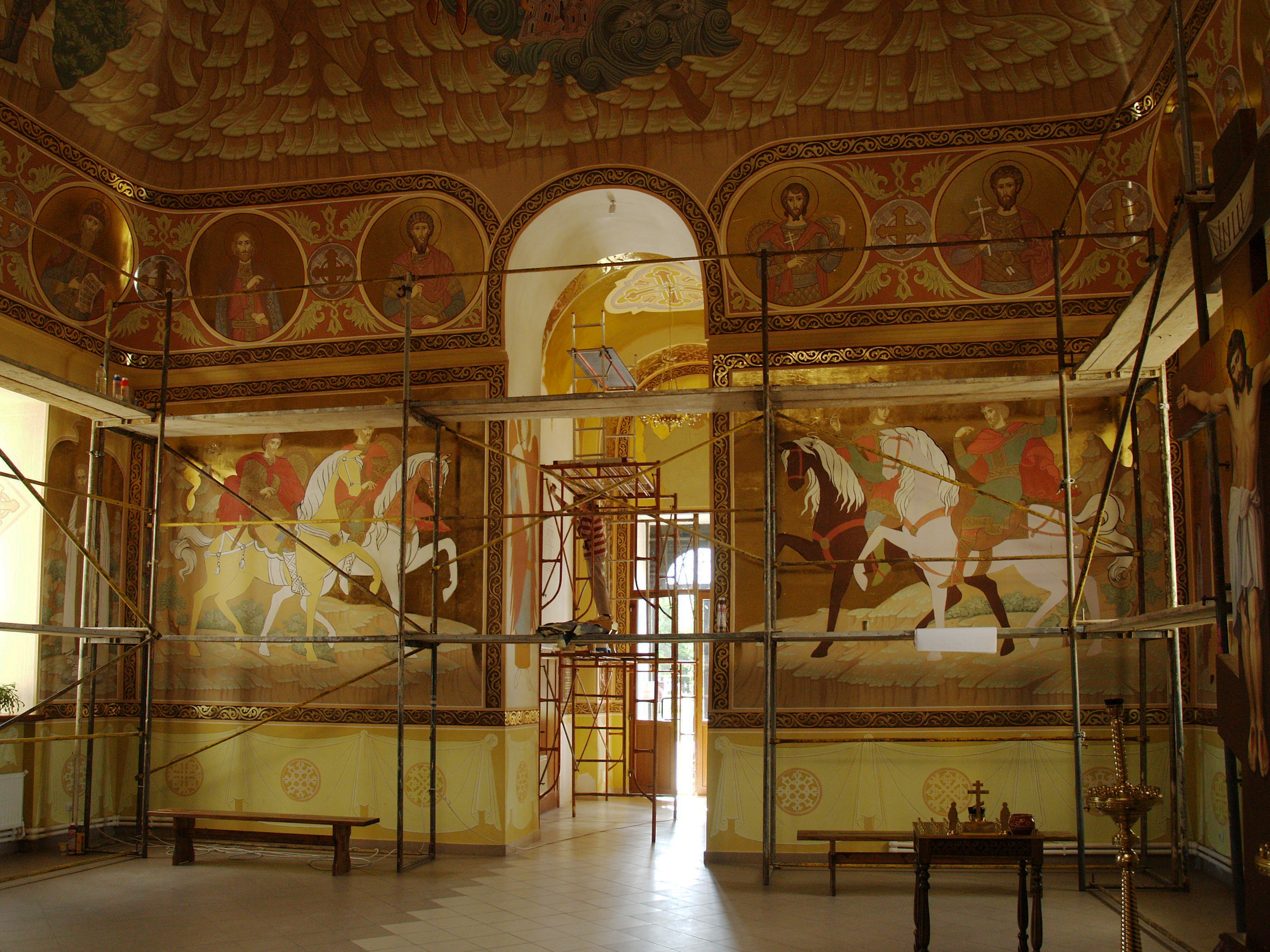
Inside the church

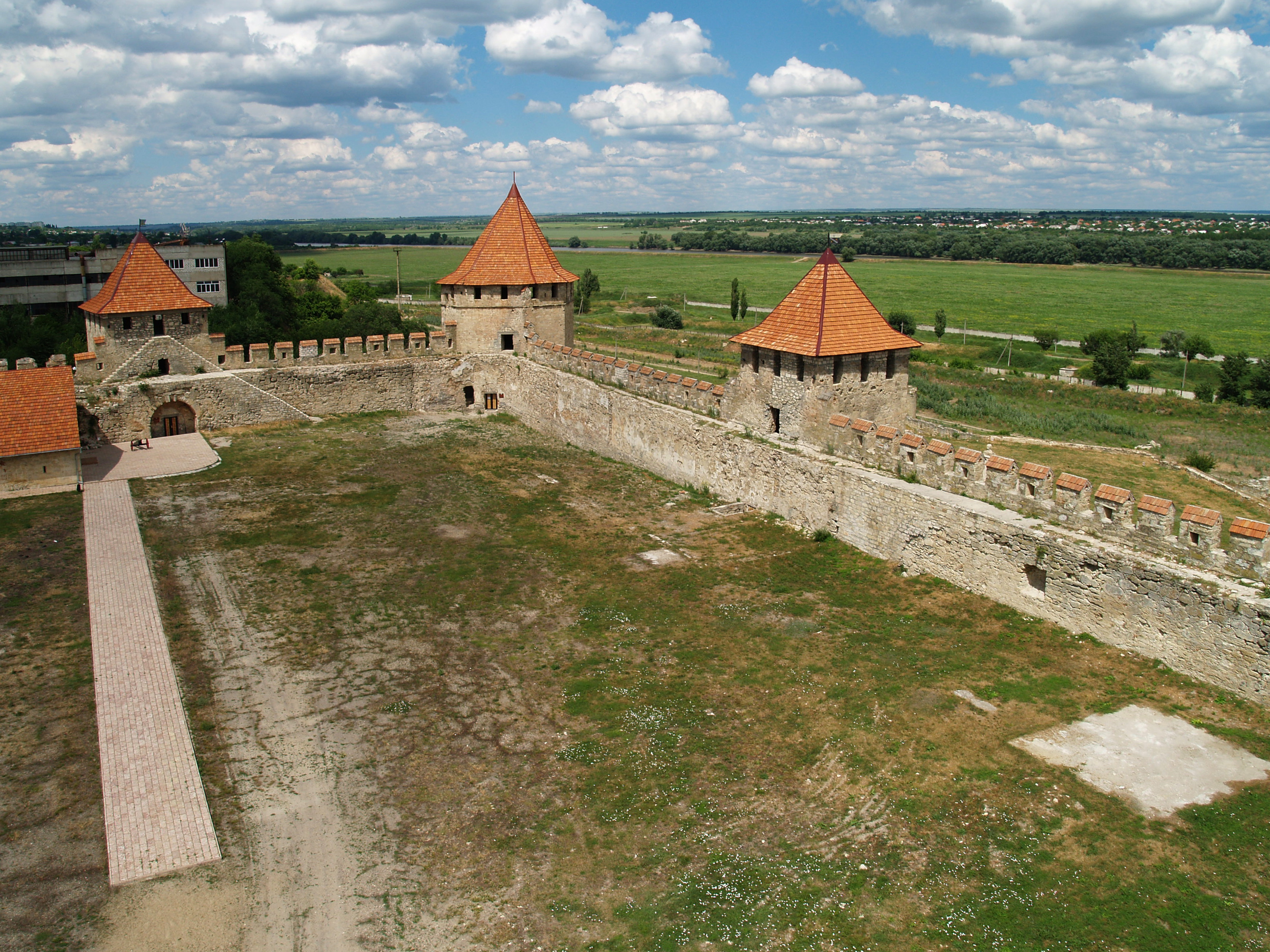

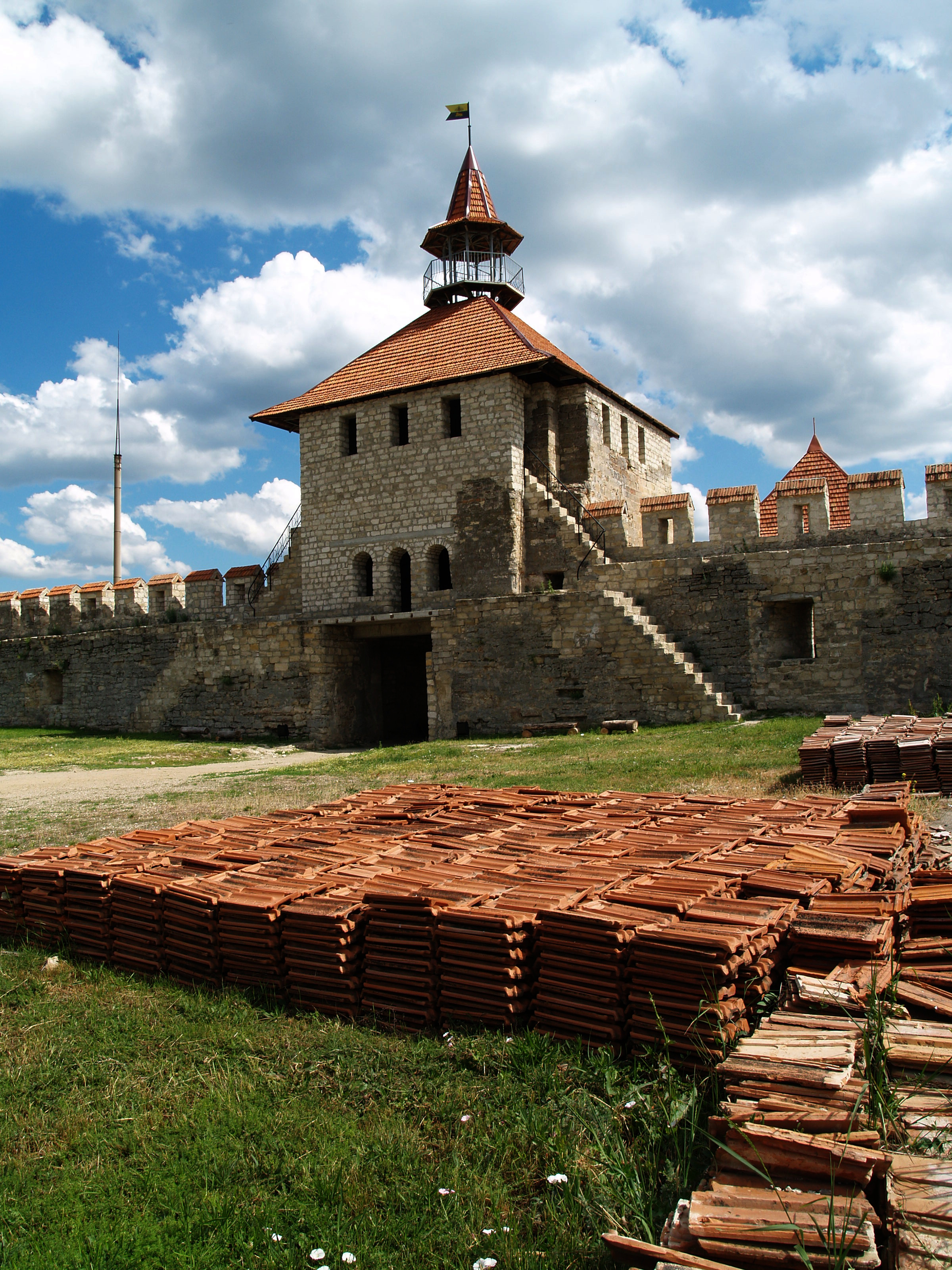

=== Before 2013 ===
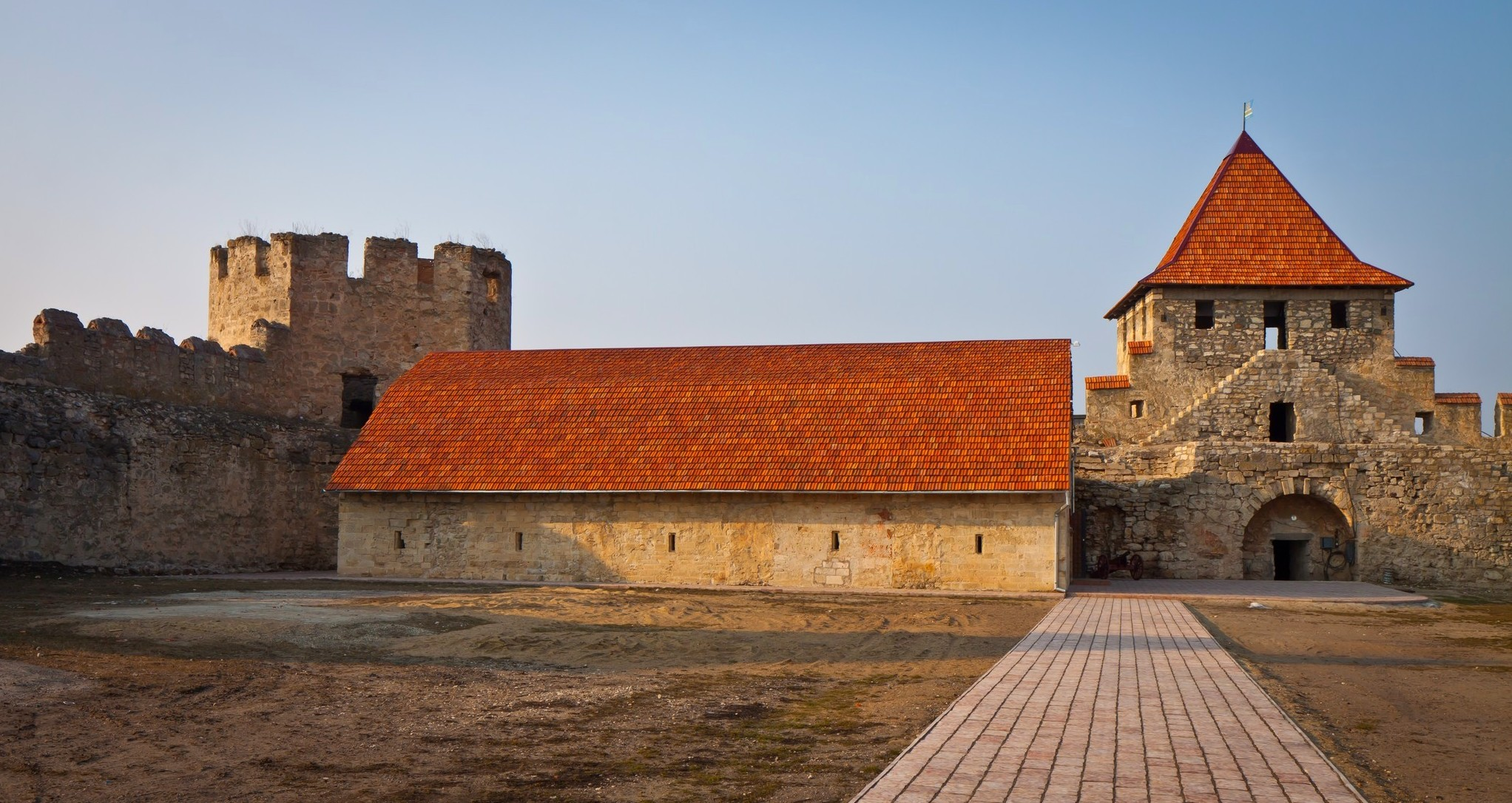
Inside the fortress after rehabilitation (2012)

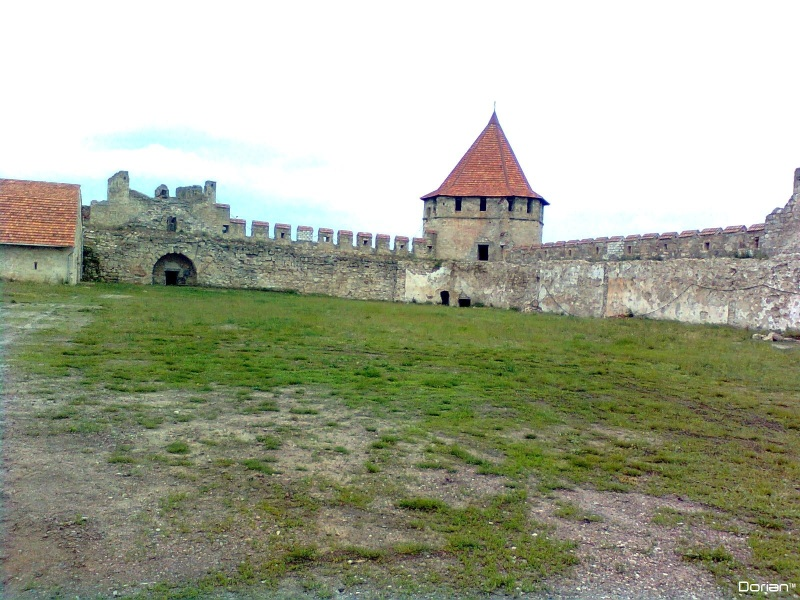
Inside the fortress before rehabilitation (2010)

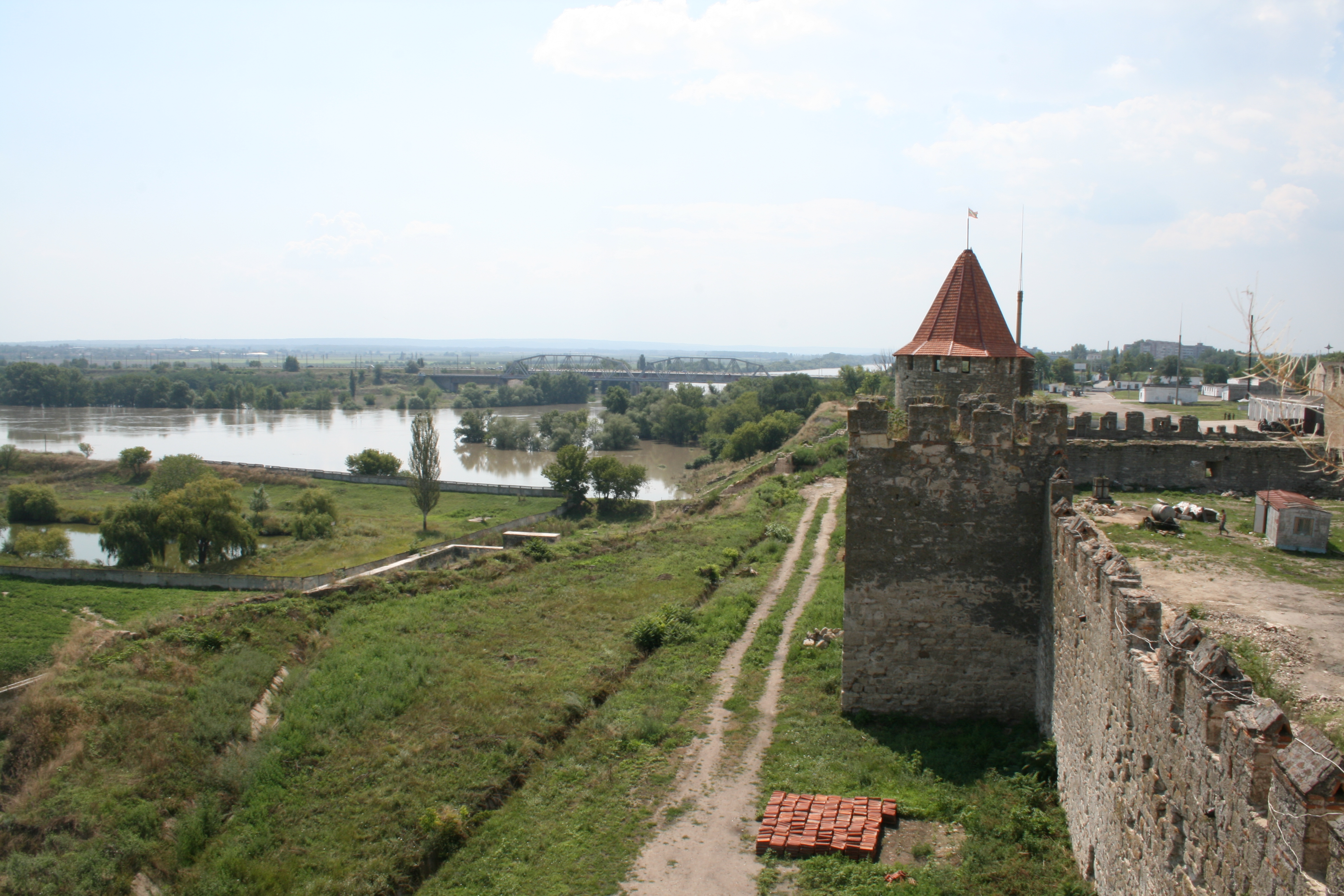
The fortress on the bank of Dniester River

=== Historical portrayal ===
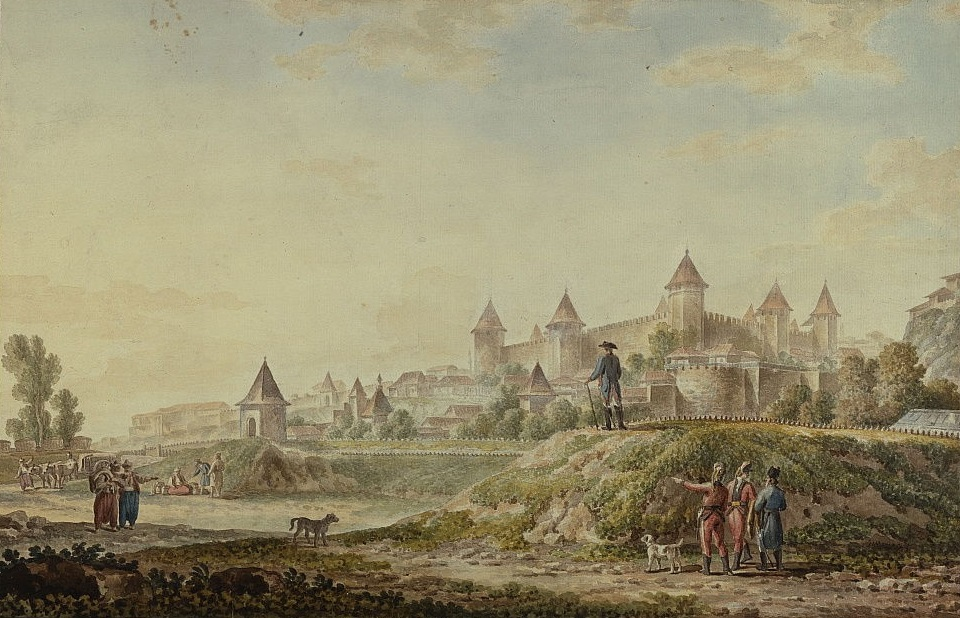
View of the fortress in Bender by Mikhail Ivanov
