= Bäxtiyär Qanqayev =

- Born: XVIII century Ufa Governorate, Bolshaya Oka
- Died: XVIII century
- Occupation: colonel in Yemelyan Pugachev's rebel army

Bäxtiyär Qanqayev, or Bäxtiyär Qanqay uğlı (Tatar: Бәхтияр Канкаев / Канкай углы, pronounced [bæxtiːˈær qʌnˈqajɪf], Russian: Бахтияр Канкаев, Bakhtiyar Kankayev) was a colonel in Yemelyan Pugachev's rebel army, joined the rebellion in December 1773. He agitated people to join the rebellion in Kungur, Ufa and Kazan uyezds, and united Tatar rebels to own unit. Participated in the battle of Kazan. In 1774 his unit was defeated by governmental forces near Balıq Bistäse. His subsequent fate is unknown. Qanqayev is said to have possibly been a part of the Mishar Tatar ethnos.

== Bäxtiär Qanqayıv in art ==
Tufan Miñnullin wrote a historical play "Bäxtiär Qanqay uğlı" in 1974. There is an audio recording in the archives of Tatarstan radio from 1978.

== See also ==
- Bulat-Batyr (a 1928 Tatar silent film, devoted to Pugachev rebellion)
