= Arsk Field =

Field in Tatarstan, Russia

Coordinates: 55.797°N 49.159°E

Arsk Field (Russian: Арское поле; Tatar: Арча кыры) was east of the walls of mediaeval Kazan. The name may come from the Archa Darugha, a subdivision of the Khanate of Kazan. Alternatively, it could be named for the road leading to the city of Arsk, which passed through the field. In 1552 it served as the base of for Tatar troops during the siege of Kazan by Russian troops under Ivan the Terrible. In 1774, it was a battlefield for engagements between rebels supporting Pugachev and governmental forces.

In the 18th and 19th centuries, a trade fair was held at the field. Since the beginning of the 19th century the field has been built up with housing, but the nearby forest was turned into parklands, nicknamed Russian Switzerland and German Switzerland. During the Soviet period, both parks were subsumed by the newly created Gorky Park, and the park carries that name to this day.

After the 1917 October Revolution the field was renamed Yershov Field, after Nikolay Yershov, who led the Bolsheviks uprising in Kazan during the October Revolution in 1917. To this day the street running alongside the park is named Yershov Street in his honor.
