= Pavel Potemkin =

Russian general

Count Pavel Potemkin
- Павел Потёмкин
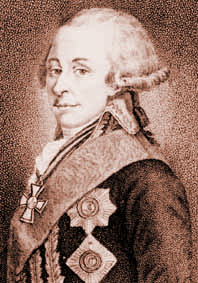

Viceroy of Caucasus
- In office 1785–1787
- Preceded by: Office created
- Succeeded by: Peter Tekeli

Personal details
- Born: July 8th [O.S. June 27th], 1743 Saint Petersburg, Russian Empire
- Died: April 9th [O.S. March 28th], 1796 Moscow, Russian Empire
- Resting place: Church of St. Nicholas the Wonderworker, Nikolskoye-Kolchevo, Podolsk district, Moscow Governorate
- Spouse: Praskovya Andreevna Zakrevskaya
- Education: Imperial Moscow University
- Occupation: Statesman, soldier, writer
- Awards: Order of St. George, 4th degree, Order of St. George, 3rd degree, Golden Weapon for Bravery, Order of St Anne, Order of Saint Alexander Nevsky, Order of St. George, 2nd degree

Military service
- Allegiance: Russian Empire
- Branch/service: Imperial Russian Army
- Years of service: 1756–1796
- Rank: General-in-chief
- Unit: Semyonovsky Life Guards Regiment
- Battles/wars: Russo-Turkish War; Siege of Izmail; Kościuszko Uprising; Battle of Praga

Count Pavel Sergeevich Potemkin, sometimes spelled Potyomkin or Potiomkin (Russian: Па́вел Серге́евич Потёмкин; 1743–1796) was a Russian statesman, soldier, and writer.

He was a cousin of Prince Grigory Potemkin, a well-known military and political figure of Empress Catherine the Great’s Russia. He took part in the wars with the rebel adventurer Yemelyan Pugachev, the Ottoman Empire, the Bar Confederation, and in the Kościuszko Uprising. He signed the Treaty of Georgievsk with King Heraclius II of Georgia in 1783.

== Early life ==
Potemkin was born on July 8th [O.S. June 27th], 1743; the son of Sergei Dmitrievich Potemkin (1694 – 1772) and Anna Mikhailovna, née Princess Kropotkina. Grigory Potemkin was a distant relative. He was one of three sons; the other two being Mikhail and Alexander.

As was customary at that time, 13-year-old Pavel was enrolled in military service in the Semyonovsky Life Guards Regiment in 1756. He graduated from Imperial Moscow University. He was awarded the honorary court position of Chamber cadet (Russian: Камер-юнкер), equivalent appointment to a valet de chambre in western Medieval courts.

== Military career ==
=== Russo-Turkish War ===
Potemkin served Imperial Russia during the Russo-Turkish War (1768–1774) and was awarded the Order of St. George, 4th Class on September 22, 1770 for bravery in battle against the Ottoman Empire. He was awarded 3rd Class of the same award on November 26, 1775. He was known as a brave and capable officer who moved up the ranks quickly, although this may have been in part due to the support of his cousin, Grigory Potemkin.

=== Pugachev's Rebellion ===
Potemkin was appointed head of secret investigative commissions on June 11, 1774, by Catherine the Great, putting him in charge of the Kazan and Orenburg secret commissions to investigate and punish participants in Pugachev's rebellion. He was in Kazan at the time of its capture by Pugachev’s troops on July 15, 1774, and together with the garrison and townspeople he locked himself in the Kazan Kremlin. However that evening, Russian forces under Johann von Michelsohnen reached Kazan and defeated the rebels, forcing Pugachev to retreat.

He supervised the interrogations of many of the captured Pugachev associates in Kazan, and later in Simbirsk. In October 1774, together with General-in-Chief Petr Ivanovich Panin, the military leader of the suppression of the uprising, he interrogated Yemelyan Pugachev in Simbirsk, before returning to Moscow.

After the investigation and trial in January 1775, Potemkin was awarded the Golden Weapon for Bravery. In 1777 he was awarded the Order of St. Anne. On June 28, 1778, he was promoted to chamberlain and awarded the Order of St. Alexander Nevsky.

From October 1781 to June 1782, he assisted James Bruce, who had simultaneously been awarded two different posts, by filling in the post of Governor-General of the Tver Governorate, today split between Tver Oblast and Moscow Oblast.

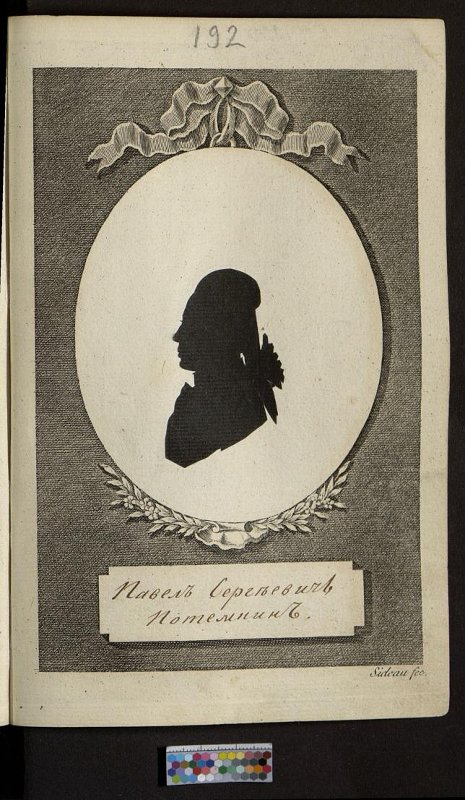
Silhouette in the album "Collection of silhouette images of Catherine II's contemporaries"

=== North Caucasus ===
In the fall of 1782, Lieutenant General Pavel took command of the Russian army in the North Caucasus.

At the end of 1782, he persuaded the Kartli-Kakheti king Heraclius II of Georgia to request the Empress of Russia Catherine II accept Georgia as a protectorate of Russia. In an effort to strengthen Russia's position in the Caucasus, Catherine II granted Pavel Potemkin broad powers to conclude an agreement with Heraclius II. On July 24, 1783, the Treaty of Georgievsk was signed in the Georgievsk fortress.

In September 1783, Russian troops led by Lieutenant General Potemkin and Lieutenant General Alexander Samoylov crossed the Terek, devastated Chechnya and defeated Chechen troops in the battles of Atagi and Khankala.

In 1784, Potemkin was appointed governor-general of the Saratov Governorate, a position he held until 1787. Moreover, in 1785 he was appointed governor-general of the Caucasus Viceroyalty until 1792.

=== Further career ===
Throughout the Russo-Turkish War (1787–1792) he served in the active army. He commanded the right wing assault during the Siege of Izmail, and was awarded the Order of St. George, 2nd class, for his distinction during the assault.

By decree of Empress Catherine II of June 3, 1791, Potemkin was granted a cloth factory in the village of Glushkovo, Kursk province, along with all the villages, people and lands.

In 1794 he took part in the Kościuszko Uprising, including the Battle of Praga. At the end of hostilities he received the rank of general-in-chief, and in 1795 — the title of count.

In January 1796, he was accused of complicity in the murder and robbery of the Persian prince Idast Khan in 1786. Defending himself from unfair accusations, Potemkin wrote the poem The Voice of Innocence. Shortly thereafter, he fell ill with a fever and died on April 8th [O.S. March 28th], 1796 in Moscow. He was buried in the family tomb in Nikolskoye-Kolchevo, Podolsk district, Moscow Governorate, in the church of St. Nicholas the Wonderworker.

== Essays ==
Potemkin was an amateur poet and author of a number of poetic works. According to Ivan Dmitrevsky, Potemkin was “a man with great talent, and if he had not devoted himself entirely to military service, he would have been an excellent writer.” He translated several poems into Russian including the play Mahomet by Voltaire and authored two dozen poems including two poetic dramas:

- The Russians in the Archipelago, Russian: Россы в Архипелаге (1772);
- The Triumph of Friendship, Russian: Торжество дружбы (1773).

== Family ==
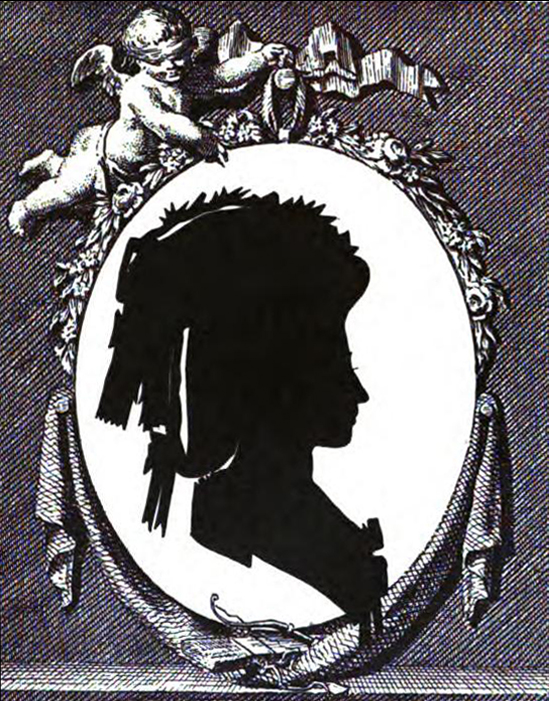
Praskovya Andreevna Praskovya

In 1785, Potemkin married Praskovya Andreevna Zakrevskaya (02.09.1765 – 1816), maid of honor of the court, whose father Andrey Osipovich Zakrevsky was a state councilor, director of the Imperial Academy of Arts, St. Petersburg, and district marshal of the nobility. She was a lady of state, famous at court for her beauty and was the favorite of His Serene Highness Prince Grigory Potemkin. The marriage had two sons:

- Grigory (1786–08/26/1812) who died in the Battle of Borodino;
- Sergei (1787–1858) — a writer who went on to marry Princess Elizaveta Petrovna Trubetskoy (1796 – after 1870).
