= Battle of Tsaritsyn (1774) =

Part of Pugachev's Rebellion

- Part of Pugachev's Rebellion
Date	August 21, 1774
Location	Tsaritsyn (modern Volgograd)
Result	Russian victory

Belligerents
Russian Empire	Serfs

Commanders and leaders
Johann von Michelsohnen	Yemelyan Pugachev

Strength
5,000 men	10,000 men

Casualties and losses
90 killed	2,000 killed 6,000 captured

The Battle of Tsaritsyn was decisive confrontation between the Imperial Russian Army, commanded by Johann von Michelsohnen, and serf rebels, led by Yemelyan Pugachev. After Pugachev's victory in the Kazan, Michelsohnen was tasked with the suppression of the revolt, which occurred on August 21, 1774, near Tsaritsyn although the rebels outnumbered his forces. Afterward, the rebellion quickly collapsed. Pugachev himself escaped but was captured on September 14 and executed on January 10 the next year.
