= Battle of Kazan (1774) =

Major battle during Pugachev's Rebellion

Coordinates: 55°47′N 49°10′E

- Part of Pugachev's Rebellion
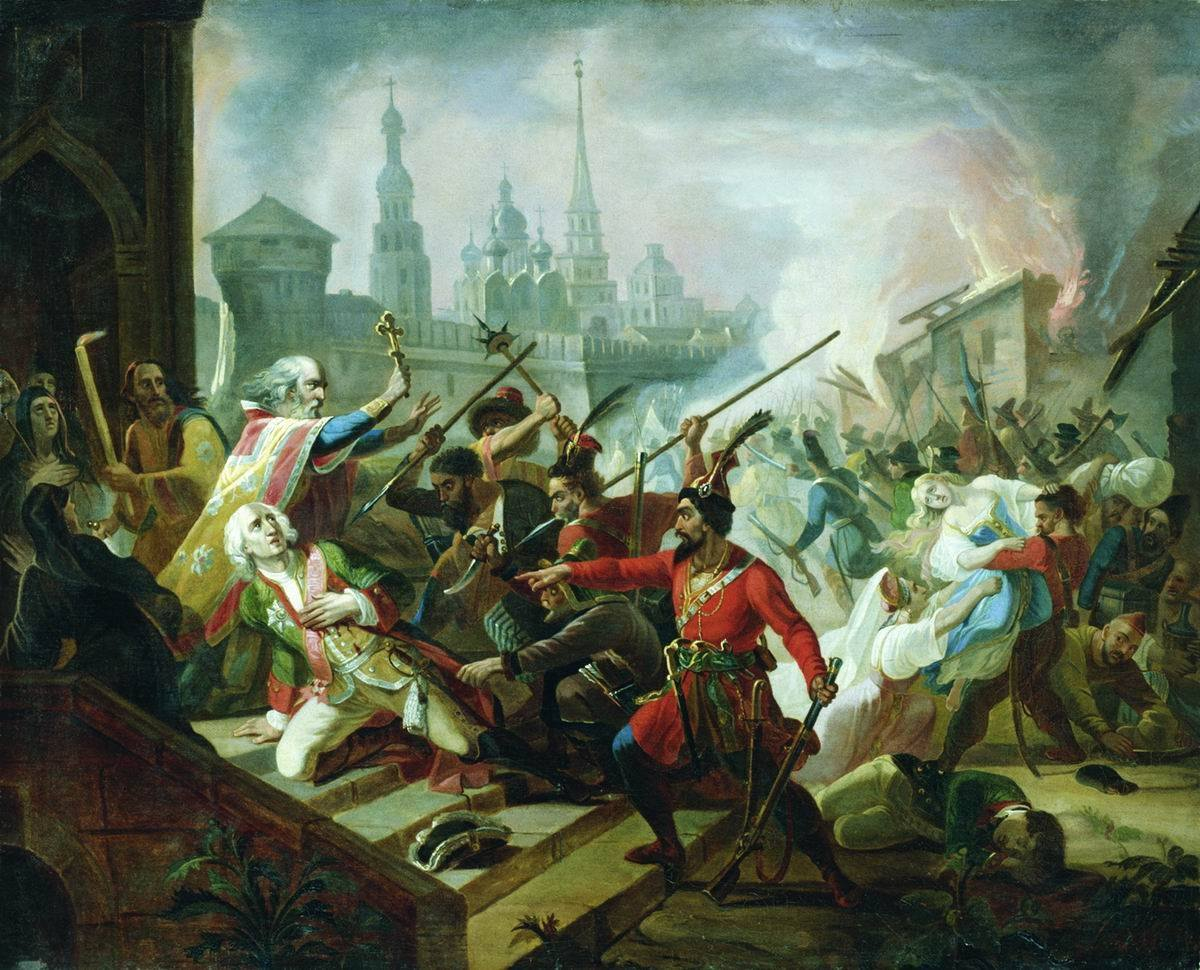
- Pugachev's storming of Kazan, by Fyodor Moller
| Date | 12–15 July 1774 |
| Location | Kazan, Russian Empire |
| Result | Major strategic Imperial Russian victory |

Belligerents
| (Russian Empire) Russian Imperial Army; Russian Nobility | Cossack and peasant rebels Tatar Nobility; Bashkirs; Kazakhs |

Commanders and leaders
| Ivan Ivanovich Michelson; Pavel S. Potyomkin; Jakob von Brandt | Yemelyan Pugachev; Ivan Beloborodov (POW); Andrei Ovchinnikov; Mineyev (POW); Bakhmutov |

Units involved
| Cossacks peasants and workers Bashkirs | Kazan garrison noble and civilian militants Michelson forces |

Strength
| 2,000–6,000 in Kazan; 9 cannons + citadel cannons, Michelson's troops N/A | 25,000 men first battle 20 cannons 15,000 men second battle |

Casualties and losses
| At least 215 killed | 2,000 killed 10,000 captured all cannons |

Pugachev's path in what is today Tatarstan

The Battle of Kazan (1774) was a major battle during Pugachev's Rebellion. It took place on 12–15 July 1774 in Kazan, Russia, and the surrounding area. The first stage began in the morning of 12 July, when rebels under Yemelyan Pugachev defeated government troops and besieged them in the Kazan Kremlin. During the battle some government forces defected to the rebels' side. However, in the evening, tsarist forces under Johann Michelson reached Kazan and defeated the rebels in two battles which took place on 13 and 15 July, forcing Pugachev to retreat to Tsaryovokokshaysk and then to cross the Volga. Out of 25,000 and 15,000 rebels who participated in the first and last stages of the battle respectively, only 500 escaped.

== Prelude to the battle ==
Kazan was threatened by Pugachev as early as the autumn of 1773. Many of the town's nobles escaped to Moscow, inspiring fear there. A defensive plan was formulated by the Russian high command and was approved personally by Catherine the Great.

=== Kazan's defenders ===
There were 3 sectors of defense in Kazan. The first, under general Banner, extended from Kazanka and Arsk Field to Qaban lakes. There, government troops were reinforced by gymnasium pupils under headmaster Kanitsa and armed town militiamen. The second was from the Pleteni to Yamskoy quarter under general-mayor Larionov, and the third was from Yamskoy to Kazanka, under colonel Svechin. The area north from the citadel was defended by Admiralty troops under Shchelin. The citadel itself was reinforced and the garrison under Letskoy was ready to fight. Zilantov Monastery and the Admiralty were turned into strongholds, redoubts were installed at Kazanka's bank and Arsk Field, and a system of knife-rests was installed around the city. Nine cannons were placed behind the knife-rests. The suburban settlements were left to defend themselves without government assistance.

There were 1,500 regular troops in Kazan, along with policemen, Admiralty troops and firemen the defenders numbered 2,000. On 2 July the governor von Brandt announced a coming siege.

=== Rebels ===
Ten mullahs sent by Catherine's officers to agitate against Pugachev were killed by rebels. The Orthodox bishop Veniamin appealed to Christians to refuse from joining Pugachev army. However, many peasants from the entire region of modern Tatarstan joined the rebellion and marched to Kazan.

On 10 and 11 July Pugachev's troops encamped to the north-east of Kazan, between Troitskaya Noksa and Tsaritsyno. The army numbered 25,000, mostly Cossacks supported by Tatar and Udmurt peasants and Bashkir cavalry. Only the Cossacks had firearms; the Bashkirs were armed with bows while the peasants were mostly equipped with clubs and stakes. On 11 July, Pugachev, with an interpreter, approached Kazan borders and demanded that the loyalist forces surrender. The Tatar community was invited to support the rebellion. Von Brandt refused to disarm; however, the Tatars quarters sent seventy emissaries with presents to Pugachev. They also disclosed weaknesses in the Kazan defense.

On 12 July, at four o'clock in the morning, Pugachev convened a council of war, dividing his army into 4 groups. The first two under Beloborodov and Mineyev should attack Arsk Field, the main group under Pugachev himself attacked Sukonny (Broadcloth Manufactory) quarter. The group under Ovchinnikov and Bakhmutov should attack Tatar quarters. The storm started at six o'clock after Pugachev's prayer.

== Battle ==
=== Storm of Kazan ===
Beloborodov took Neyelova grove, the area of modern-day Gorky Park and approached the citadel by the avenue now known as Karl Marx Street. Pugachev's cannons neutralized government artillery and shelled the defenders of the cloth factory under manufacturer Dryablov. Workers joined the rebel army. The fourth group of rebels reached Mokry quarter and Admiralty.

Government troops were forced to retreat and were besieged in the citadel. Nearly half of the defenders, mostly ethnic Tatars, defected to the rebels. The central stone part of Kazan, mostly settled by Russian nobles and merchants, was set on fire. Sukonny and Tatar quarters, however, stayed safe.

Pugachev ordered his troops to safeguard the lives of civilians and captives. They were convoyed to the nearby village of Savinovo, where Pugachev invited them to join his troops. Among others, a captive Lutheran priest was appointed colonel in Pugachev's army, but nobles and resisters were massacred.

=== Pugachev's family ===
Pugachev's family, his wife Sofia Dmitrievna, his 11-year-old son Trofim, daughters Khristina and Agrafena and his brother, were imprisoned in Kazan during the rebellion. Sofia Pugacheva should confirm, that Yemelyan is not Peter III, but a Cossack. She could visit markets to spread this information. When Pugachev's group marched they occasionally met his family. Trofim called him, but Pugachev said that he is simply a friend of this family. So, he took them to unit transport.

=== Michelsohnen's arrival ===
The Kremlin surrounded, rebel cannons were installed near Spasskaya Tower and started shelling. After noon, Pugachev stopped the storm and retreated to Arsk Field. There he participated in thanksgiving service. Then he had a dinner at Tatar merchant Musa Apanayev's house.

In the evening governmental troops from Ufa under Johann von Michelsohnen reached Kazan. A harsh battle took place at the modern Gogol street, but neither side won. Pugachev retreated to Savinovo and Sukhaya Reka villages. On 13 July he tried to prevent the end of the siege of the citadel, but under the pressure of Michelson and Potyomkin the rebels were defeated and were forced to retreat. On 15 July Pugachyov's army of 15,000 was defeated in the battle of Arsk Field. Pugachev with 500 men escaped to Tsaryovokokshaysk, to cross the Volga on 18 July and to continue his struggle then. Michelson didn't follow him, as government forces had no horses.

Before the trial captives were imprisoned in a camp near the suburb of Bishbalta. In autumn two gallows were placed in Kazan, one in Sukonny, another in Tatar quarter. Many captive rebels were executed, including Beloborodov and Mineyev.

== Aftermath ==
After Pugachev's escape some rebel groups under Bäxtiär Qanqayıv and Usman Timerev continued the resistance, but they were shortly neutralized by governmental troops.

The battle of Kazan had a significant role in Tatarstan's history. The Tatar participation in the rebellion numbered up to 85,000. Nevertheless, the participants of the rebellion were harshly punished. The Tsar's government continued its policy of the support of Muslim nobility and clergy, to prevent similar uprisings as a result of religious oppression in the future. Feudal oppression, however, stayed for a long time.

This battle took a major place in the Soviet culture. The first Tatar movie Bulat-Batır was devoted to Pugachev's rebellion in Tatarstan and the siege of Kazan.

== See also ==
- Pugachov's oak
