= Arsk uprising =

Arsk Uprising
- Part of the left-wing uprisings against the Bolsheviks
Date	October 25 – November 15, 1918
Location	Arsk, Kazan Governorate, Russian SFSR
Result	Red Army victory

Belligerents
Peasant rebels	(Russian Soviet Federative Socialist Republic) Red Army

Strength
N/A	N/A

Casualties and losses
31 killed 11 wounded	N/A

The Arsk uprising (Tatar: Арча фетнәсе, romanized: Arça fetnäse) was a Tatar peasant rebellion against the Soviet power in Kazan, Layesh, Mamadysh uyezds of Kazan Governorate. It started on October 25, 1918, against the prodrazvyorstka policy. On November 10 rebels took the town of Arsk. Red guards with cannons were sent to suppress the rebellion. On November 15 the rebellion was defeated, 31 rebels were killed, 11 wounded. The participants of the rebellion repaid a contribution to the Soviet power.
