= Arsk =

Town in the Republic of Tatarstan, Russia

Arsk Арск
- Town

Other transcription(s)
  - Tatar: Арча
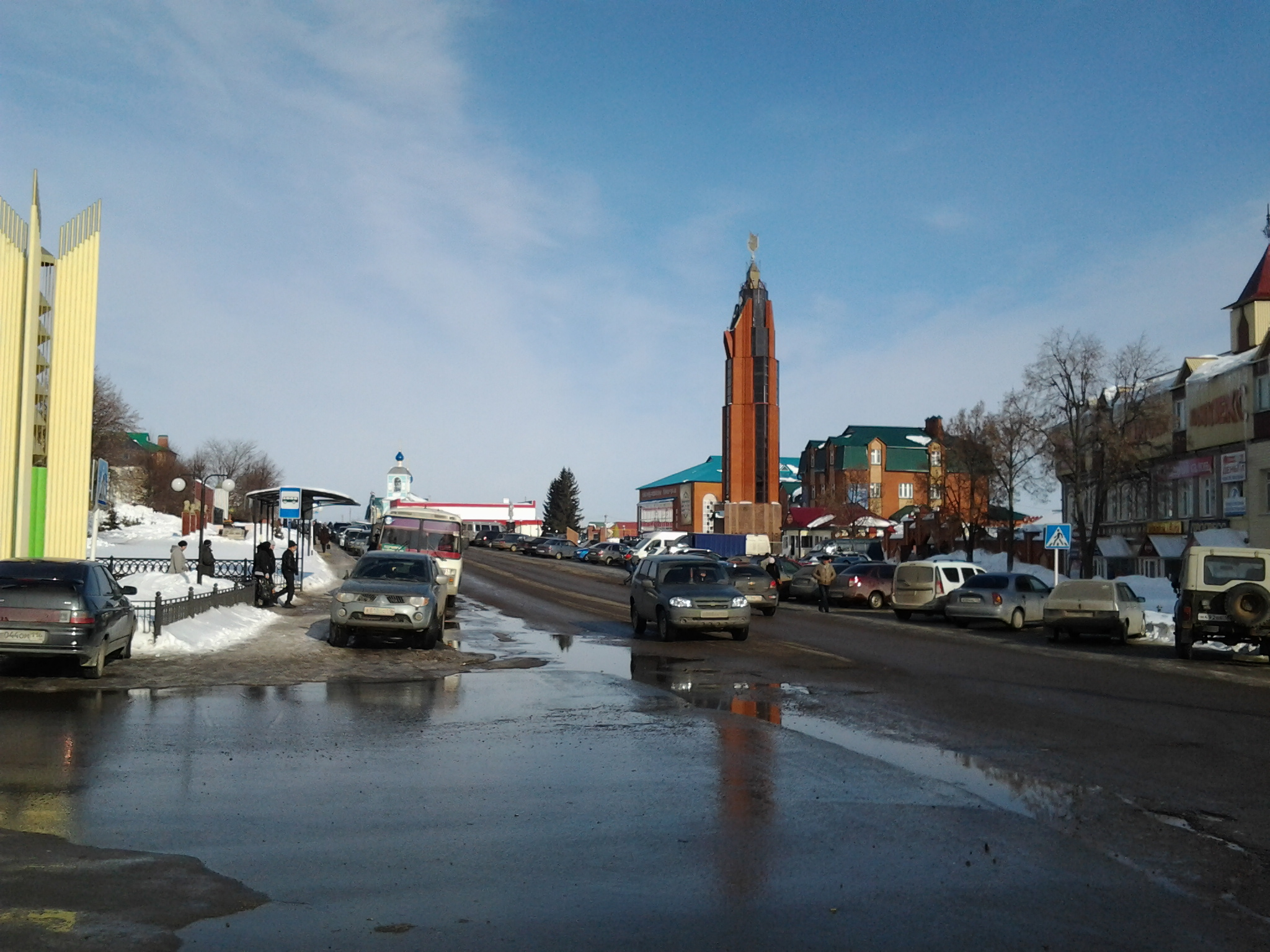
- Sovetskaya Square in Arsk

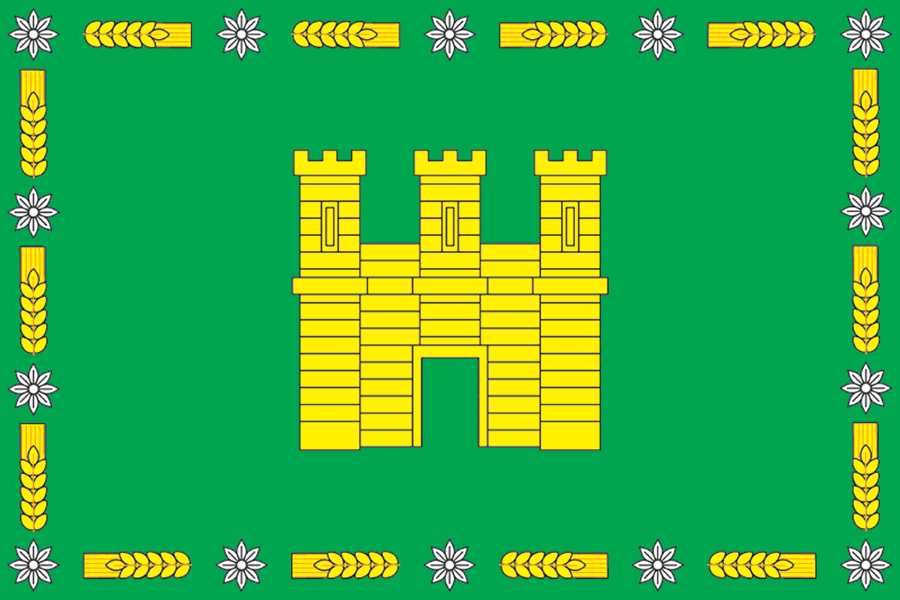
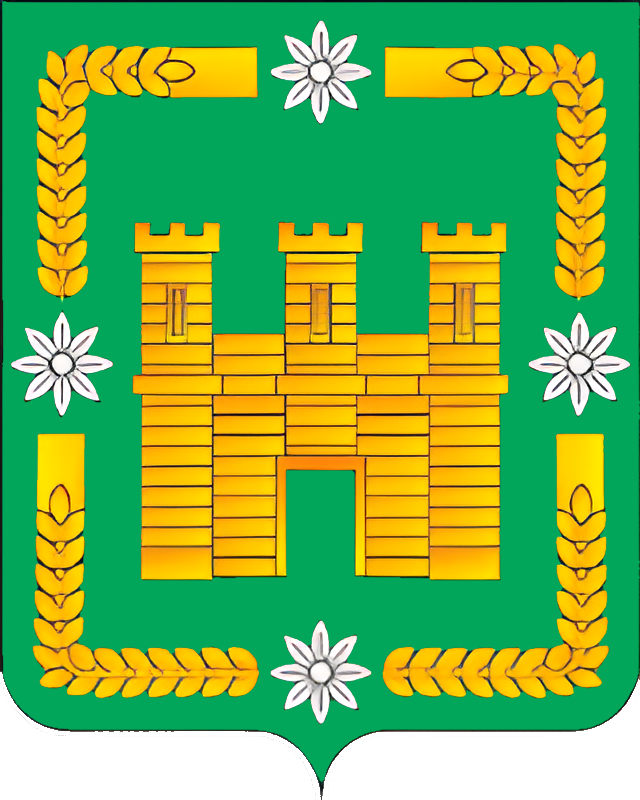
- Flag Coat of arms
- Interactive map of Arsk
- Location of Arsk Arsk (Tatarstan)
- Coordinates: 56°06′N 49°53′E
- Country: Russia
- Federal subject: Tatarstan
- Administrative district: Arsky District
- Founded: 13th century
- Town status since: June 27, 2008
- Elevation: 100 m (330 ft)

Population (2010 Census)
  - Total: 18,114
  - Estimate (2021): 20,421 (+12.7%)

Administrative status
  - Capital of: Arsky District

Municipal status
  - Municipal district: Arsky Municipal District
  - Urban settlement: Arsk Urban Settlement
  - Capital of: Arsky Municipal District, Arsk Urban Settlement
- Time zone: UTC+3 (MSK)
- Postal codes: 422000, 422002, 422008, 422049
- OKTMO ID: 92612151001

Arsk population
- 2010 Census: 18,114
- 2002 Census: 17,211
- 1989 Census: 13,938
- 1979 Census: 11,376

Arsk (Russian: Арск, IPA: [ˈarsk]; Tatar: Арча) is a town and the administrative center of Arsky District in Tatarstan, Russia, located on the Kazanka River, 65 kilometers (40 mi) from the republic's capital of Kazan. As of the 2010 Census, its population was 18,114.

== Etymology ==
The Tatar name of the town (Арча) can be translated as "Udmurt's" or "Udmurtian".

== History ==
It was founded at the end of the 14th century. It was the seat of Archa Darugha (a type of subdivision) during the Khanate of Kazan period. Even though the town was located in the area mostly populated by Tatars, the larger part of the darugha's population was Udmurt. It is possible that earlier population of this area was also Finno-Ugric, who later assimilated with the Tatars.

Arsk was one of the strongest forts in the khanate. In 1506, it was the site of the Battles of Arsk Field, in which Tatar forces were defeated by the Russians but later turned the tables and won one of their most significant victories in the course of the Russo-Kazan Wars.

Arsk was captured by the Russian army under Prince Vorotynsky in 1552, the same year when Kazan itself was captured. In 1606, it was rebuilt as a Russian fortress. In 1708–1796, it was the seat of Arsky Uyezd. In 1781, it was granted town status. In 1918, it was taken in an anti-Bolshevik peasant rebellion. In 1920–1930, it was the administrative center of Arsky Kanton; when the kantons were abolished in 1930, it became the administrative center of the newly formed Arsky District. In 1938, it was demoted in status to that of an urban-type settlement. On June 27, 2008, it was granted town status again.

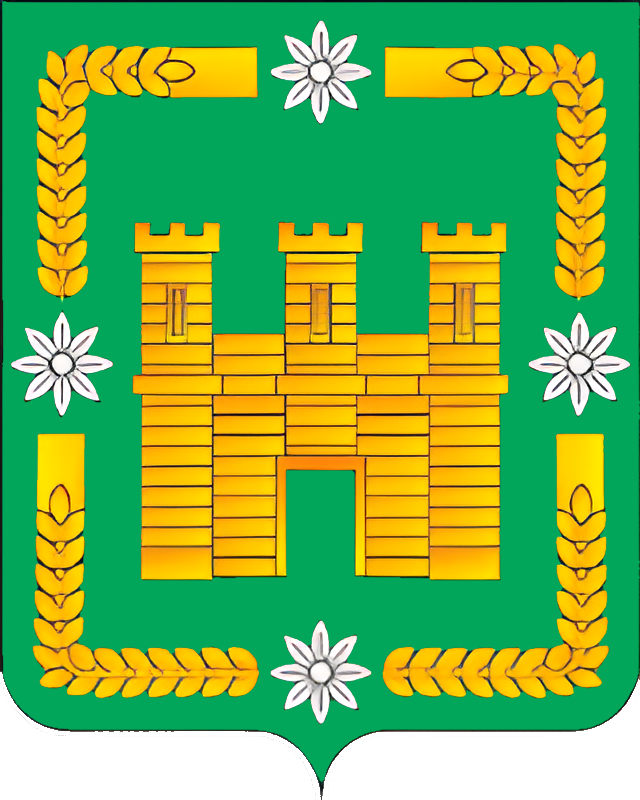
1781 coat of arms of Arsk

== Administrative and municipal status ==
Within the framework of administrative divisions, Arsk serves as the administrative center of Arsky District, to which it is directly subordinated. As a municipal division, the town of Arsk, together with five rural localities, is incorporated within Arsky Municipal District as Arsk Urban Settlement.

== Economy and transportation ==
There are several light and food industry enterprises in the town, as well as a brick factory and a construction materials factory.

The town is a station on the Kazan–Agryz railway.

== Demographics ==
Ethnically, the population is 83% Tatar and 15% Russian, with Mordvins, Mari, Chuvash, and Udmurts making up the remaining 2%.

== Namesakes ==
The eastern part of Kazan, which had been situated out of the Arsk Gates of Kazan during Khanate's epoch, was called Arsk Field. Later, this name spread to the cemetery, now situated in Central Kazan.

== See also ==
- Ar begs
