= Izmail Fortress =

Former fortress in modern-day Ukraine

- Izmail in Ukraine
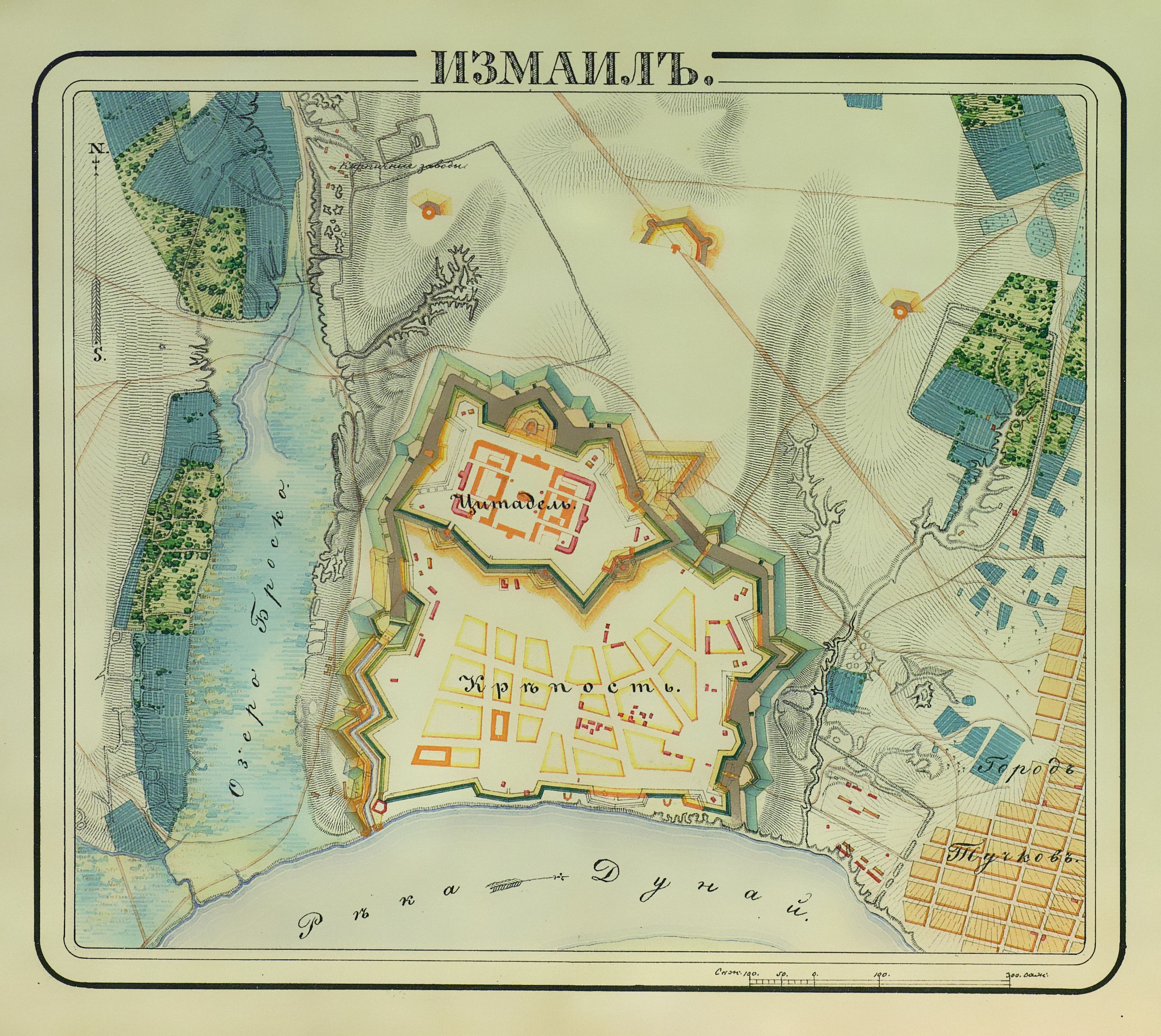
- 1830s

Site information
- Type: Fortress; Citadel

Site history
- Demolished: 19th century
- Battles/wars: Siege of Izmail (1790); Siege of Izmail (1807)

Izmail Fortress (Note: The name Izmayil is also found in certain sources. The city of Izmail was also previously called Tuchkov (Tutchkov), but the fortress remained Izmail.) was an Ottoman stronghold in the southernmost part of modern-day Ukraine, near the border with Romania and on a branch of the Danube Delta.

== History ==
In the 16th century, Izmail was mentioned as an Ottoman Turkish fortress; in 1569, Sultan Selim II settled the Nogais here. In 1761, the cathedra of Metropolitan Daniel of Brăila was established here, administering churches in all the Turkish "rayas." In 1632, Izmail was sacked by the Cossacks.

It was repeatedly attacked by the Russians. By the 1790 campaign, the Turks, under the leadership of the French engineer André-Joseph Lafitte-Clavé and the German Richter, had transformed Izmail into a formidable stronghold. In the course of the Russo-Turkish War (1787–1792), it was captured by A. Suvorov-Rymniksky after a bloody assault, preceded by a 600-cannon bombardment the day before (see Siege of Izmail). By the Treaty of Bucharest (1812), Izmail was annexed to Russia; in the 1830s, new settlers flocked to the city from various directions: Greeks, Bulgarians, fugitives from the rest of Russia, and also Old Believers. By the Treaty of Paris (1856), it was given to Wallachia. After the Russo-Turkish War (1877–1878), it again fell under Russian control on 26 April [O.S. 14 April] 1877, but only ruins remained of the fortress.

== Description ==
Izmail Fortress was given the following description in 1899, documenting the fortress' condition under Russian control after the Treaty of Bucharest:

The fortress of Izmail lies on the left bank of the Danube; its present circumference extends over 2,500 fathoms; it has 14 bastions, with only one on the Danube side covered in stone, the others are earthen, 2 batteries positioned along the Danube for horizontal action, it is surrounded by a glacis on the field side, 4 walls with stone prisons: of these, those from the north are called Hotin (Khotin/Khotyn), others from the north—Bender (Bendery), the third, from the east,—Kilia, and the fourth, towards the Danube,—Istanbul; 10 small wooden gates into the moat, 3 drawbridges, 5 barrier gates in the open pathway and 10 footholds. Inside the fortress, there are several state-owned buildings: a stone arsenal, 2 armories^{[de]}, a military prison, 4 guardhouses, 3 wings of soldiers' barracks, 2 wings of military hospitals, a lazaretto, 13 gunpowder magazines, a stone Turkish bathhouse occupied by artillery supplies, 40 dilapidated houses left over from the Turks, which house military officials, 2 Greek monasteries, one of which is the wooden monastery of the Dormition of the Mother of God, and another is of Saint Nicholas, 2 churches—one cathedral in the name of the Feast of the Cross, converted from a stone Turkish mosque, the other wooden Armenian in the name of Saint George; private buildings: 5 stone houses, 40 wooden houses, 20 wattle houses, 59 shops, 6 windmills, 12 root cellars, 9 pubs, 3 inns, 1 bathhouse, 1 forge.

Izmail Fortress, lying on the very border of the Russian Empire opposite the rather large island of Izmail Chatal (Çatal), along which the road to the Turkish fortress of Tulcea runs, could be useful for preventing enemy landings, for covering the Russian Danube flotilla [ru] and for ensuring trade.

— Статистическое описание Бессарабии, Akkerman, Типография И. М. Гринштейна, 1899

== Depictions ==
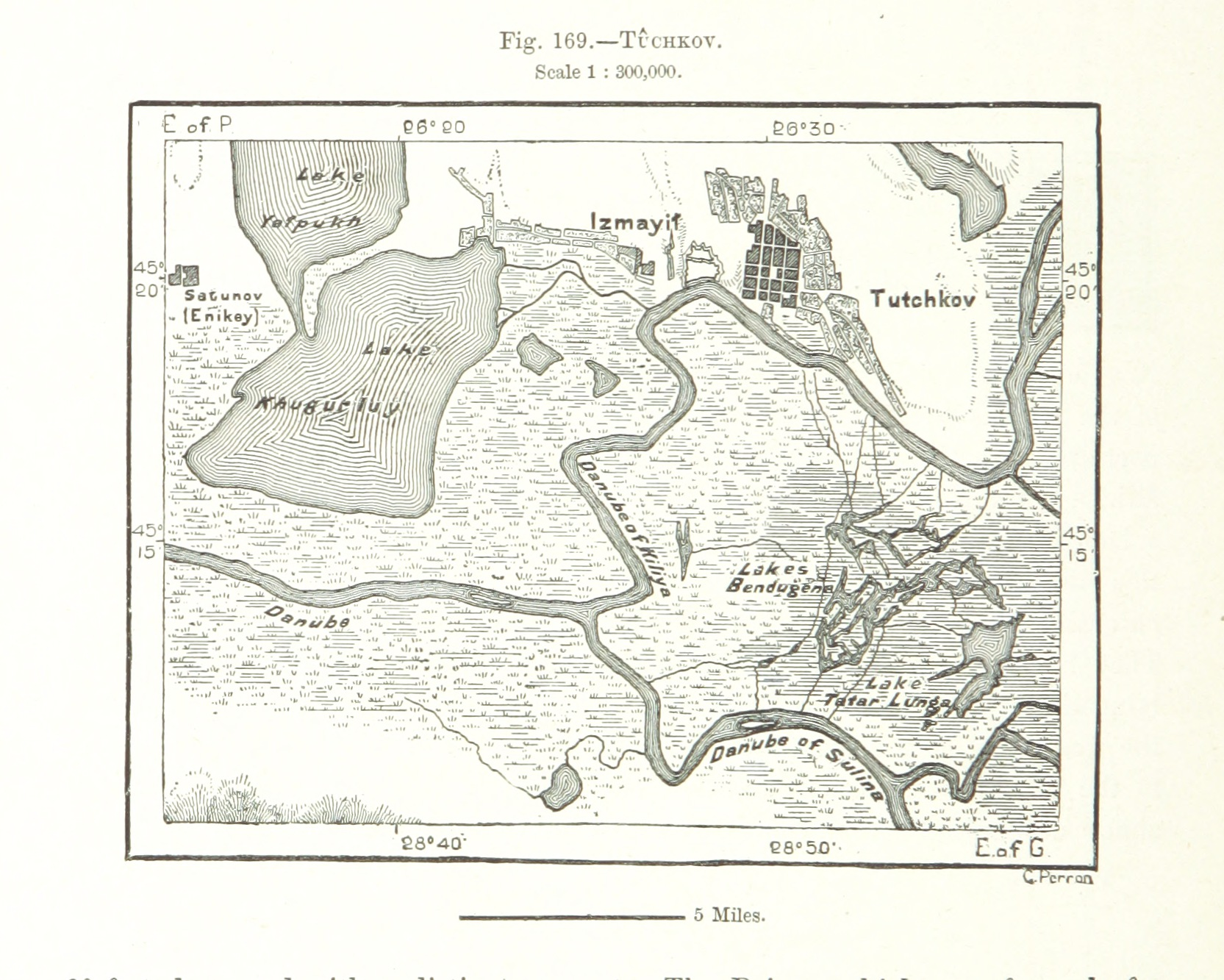
1882. The city of Izmail, then called Tuchkov/Tutchkov, and the Izmail/Izmayil fortress to the left.

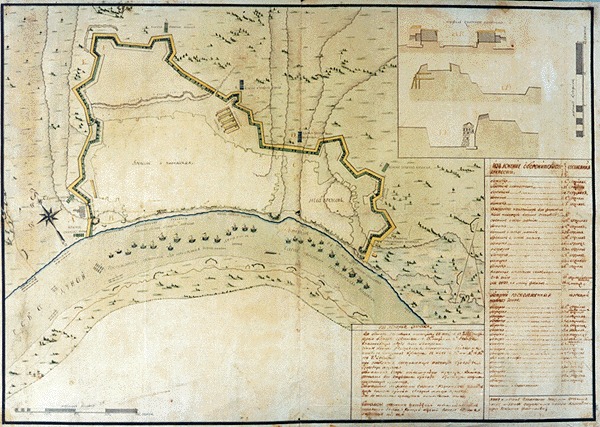
Fortification map (1790)

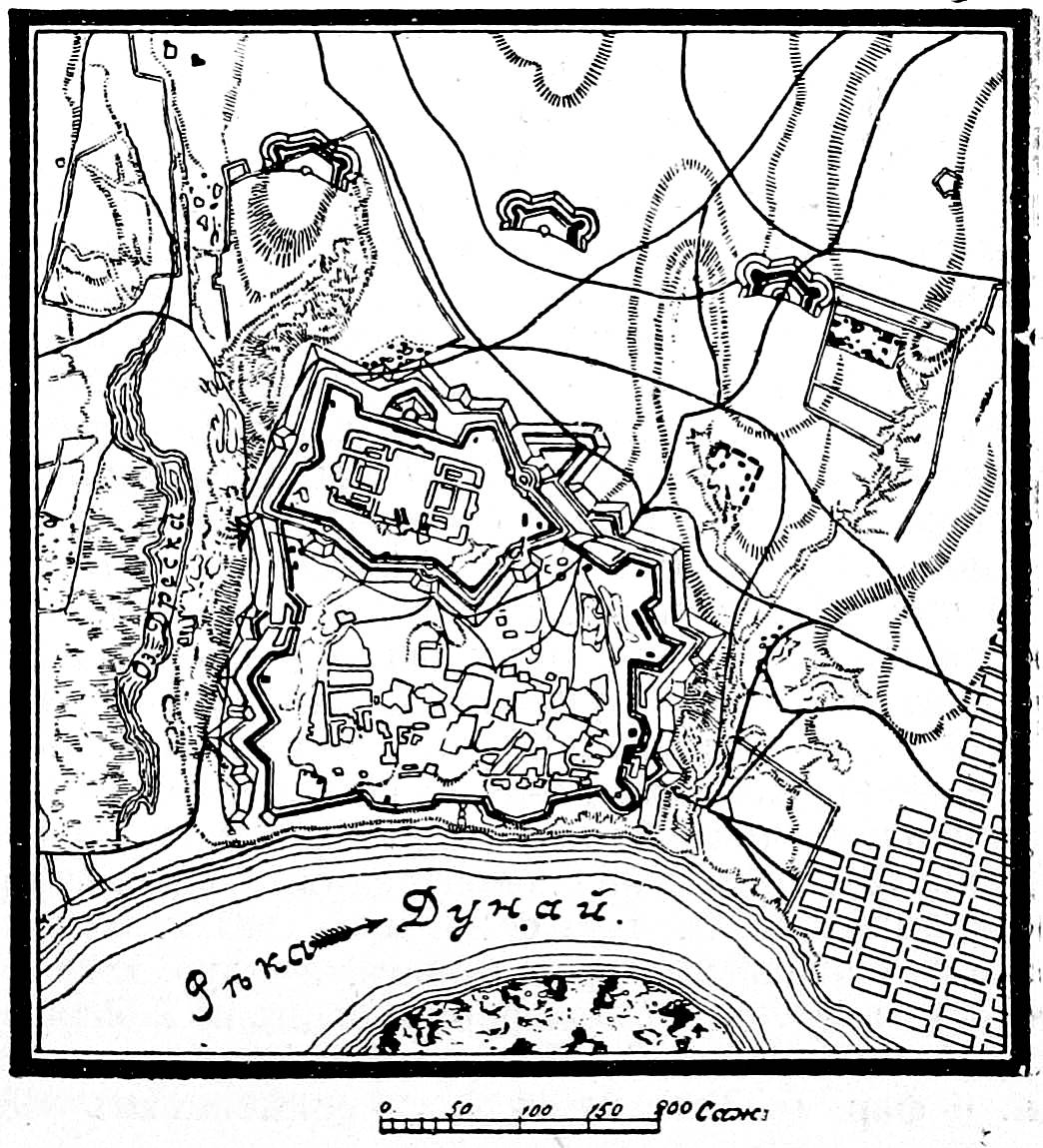
Map No. 1 to the article "Izmail". Sytin Military Encyclopedia (St. Petersburg, 1911–1915)

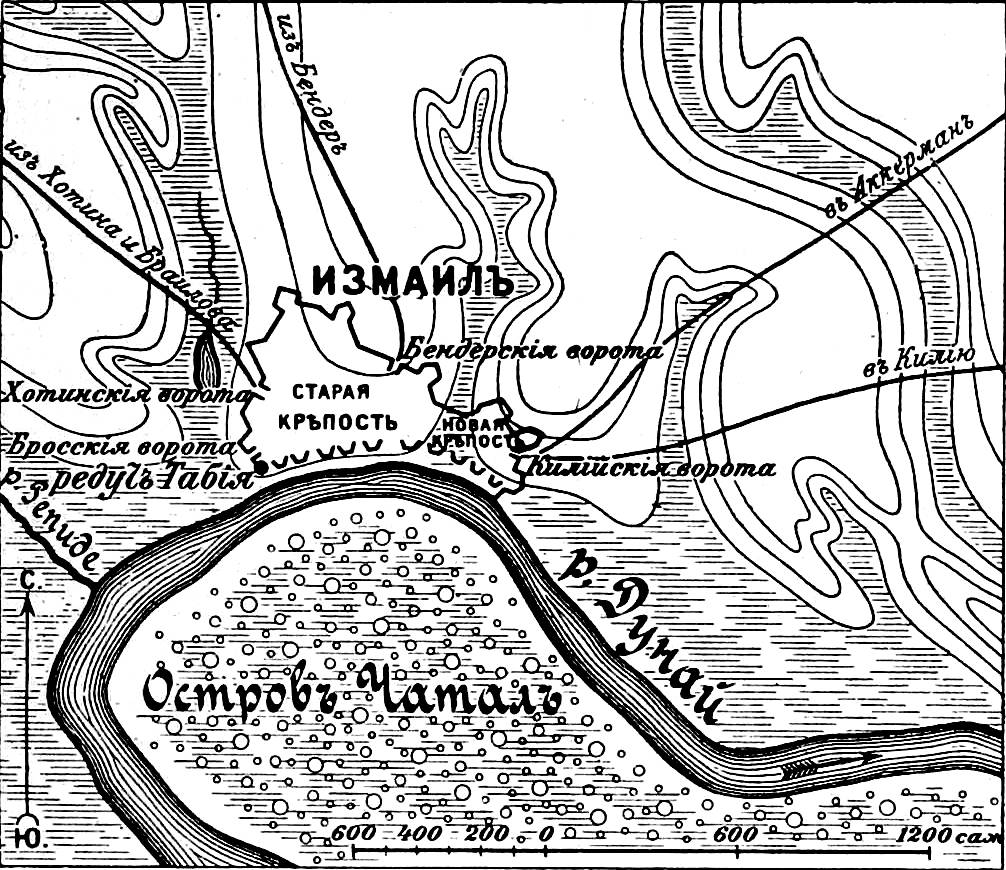
Map No. 3 to the article "Izmail". Sytin Military Encyclopedia (St. Petersburg, 1911–1915)

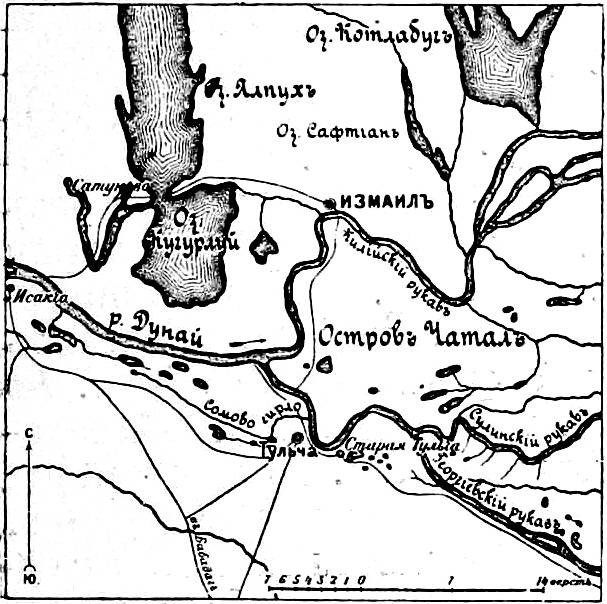
Map No. 4 to the article "Izmail". Sytin Military Encyclopedia (St. Petersburg, 1911–1915)
