= Lake Yalchik =

Lake in Russia

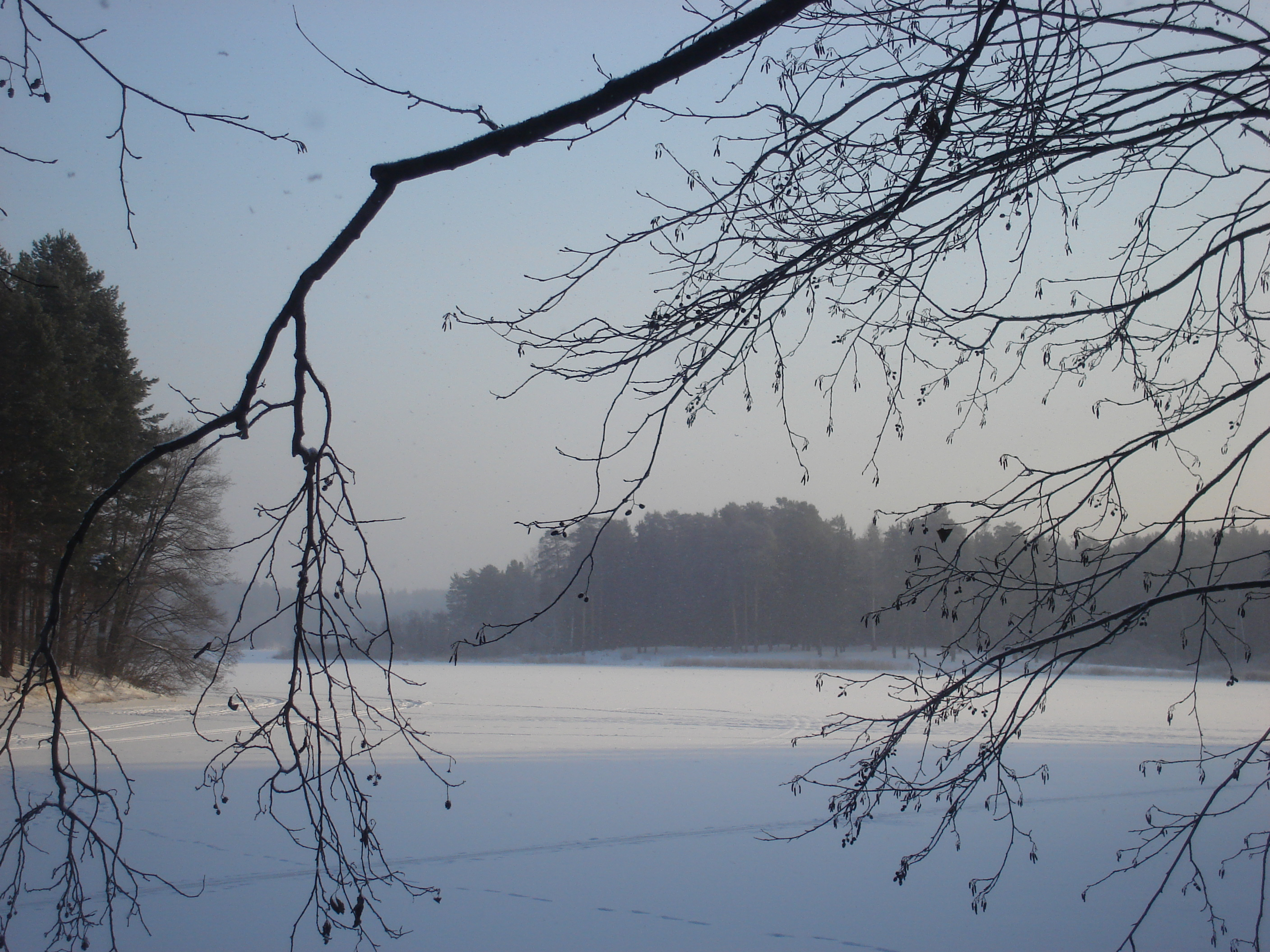
- Frozen Smaller Yalchik

- Location within Russia

- Location: Mari El
- Coordinates: 56°00′40″N 48°24′30″E
- Type: karst
- Basin countries: Russia
- Surface area: Greater Yalchik: 128.5 ha (317.5 acres); Smaller Yalchik: 53.6 ha (132.4 acres)
- Average depth: Greater: 7.89 m (25.9 ft); Smaller: 8.7 m (29 ft)
- Max. depth: Greater: 28.8 m (94 ft); Smaller: 32.0 m (105.0 ft)
- Water volume: Greater: 10,439 m^{3} (13,654 yd^{3}); Smaller: 2,580 m^{3} (3,370 yd^{3})
- Shore length^{1}: Greater: 9,460 m (10,350 yd); Smaller: 5,590 m (6,110 yd)
- Surface elevation: Greater: 88.4 m (290 ft); Smaller: 89.8 m (295 ft)
- Islands: no
- Settlements: Yalchevsky
- ^{1} Shore length is not a well-defined measure.

Lake Yalchik (Russian: Яльчик, Meadow Mari: Ялчык, Jalčyk) is the largest lake in Mari El, Russia, located in the Marii Chodra national park. Lake Yalchik plays a major role in tourism in region and several tourist centres are located here. It is renowned locally for its clean and warm water.

== Hydrology ==
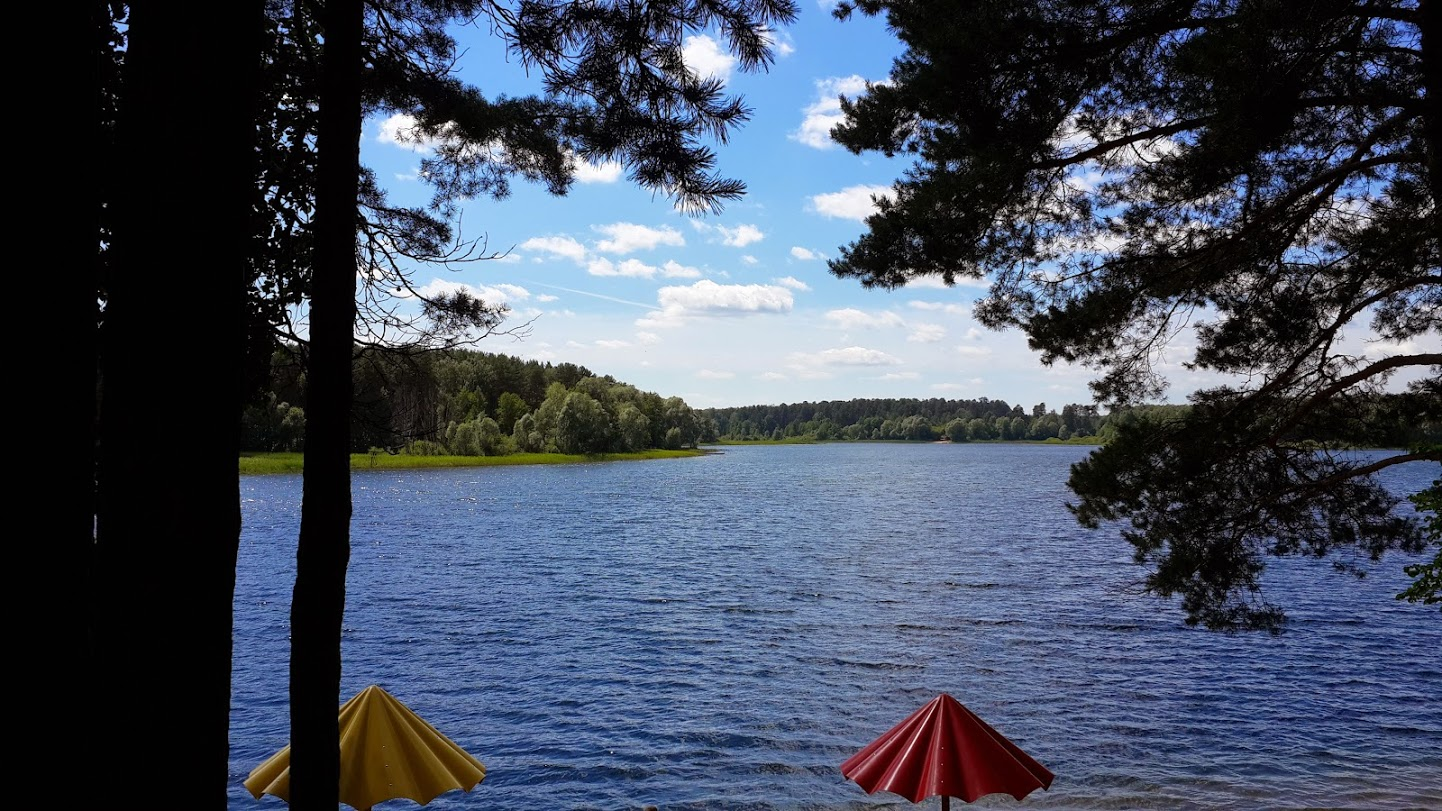
Bigger Yalchik, Health complex, June 30, 2014

Lake Yalchik is a system of two lakes, the Greater and Smaller Yalchiks, which are linked by a channel which periodically dries up in summer. The elevation of Smaller Yalchik is higher than that of Greater Yalchik, but flow from Smaller Yalchik can only be observed at spring tide. The area of the lake is increasing due to the karst processes that shape the area. Legend says that the lake appeared after the major collapse of a meadow, which was originally in the location of the lake. The last major collapse occurred in 1914 and it generated a tsunami-like wave. At the bottom of the lake there are two series of karst caves, 1,600 and 1,200 meters (5,200 and 3,900 ft) long, and up to 30 meters (98 ft) deep.

Greater Yalchik has a complex shape and many bays, whereas Smaller Yalchik has an elongated shape. Smaller Yalchik has two little brooks as inflows, but the Greater Yalchik has none.

== Etymology ==
According to a local Mari legend the lake is named in honour of national hero Yalche.

There is also a possibility that the name of the lake has Turkic root. Turkish diminutive suffix is -chik, and yalchik means small yal where yal means village in the Chuvash. Turkish influence could also be seen in the name of the region Mari El, as el means country. Also many of the locations in Marii El have the jär/yer endings, which in Turkish means place.

== Recreation ==
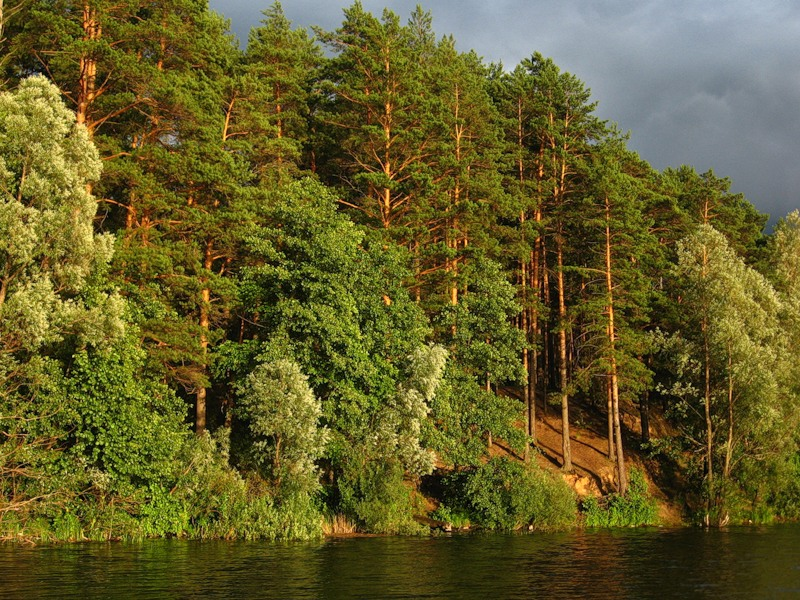
The landscape along the lake shore.

Being popular for its unique nature, Yalchik attracts many tourists, mostly from Kazan. However, there are no beaches at the lake, and the most of its coastline is covered with reed. Many tourists reach Yalchik by own cars, but a significant number of them use a railway. The closest station to Yalchik is in the settlement of Yalchevsky.

Some Mari and Tatarstan universities sometimes arrange science conferences at the Yalchik's rest home.
