= Battle of Porrassalmi =

1789 battle of the Russo-Swedish War

- Part of the Russo-Swedish War (1788–90)
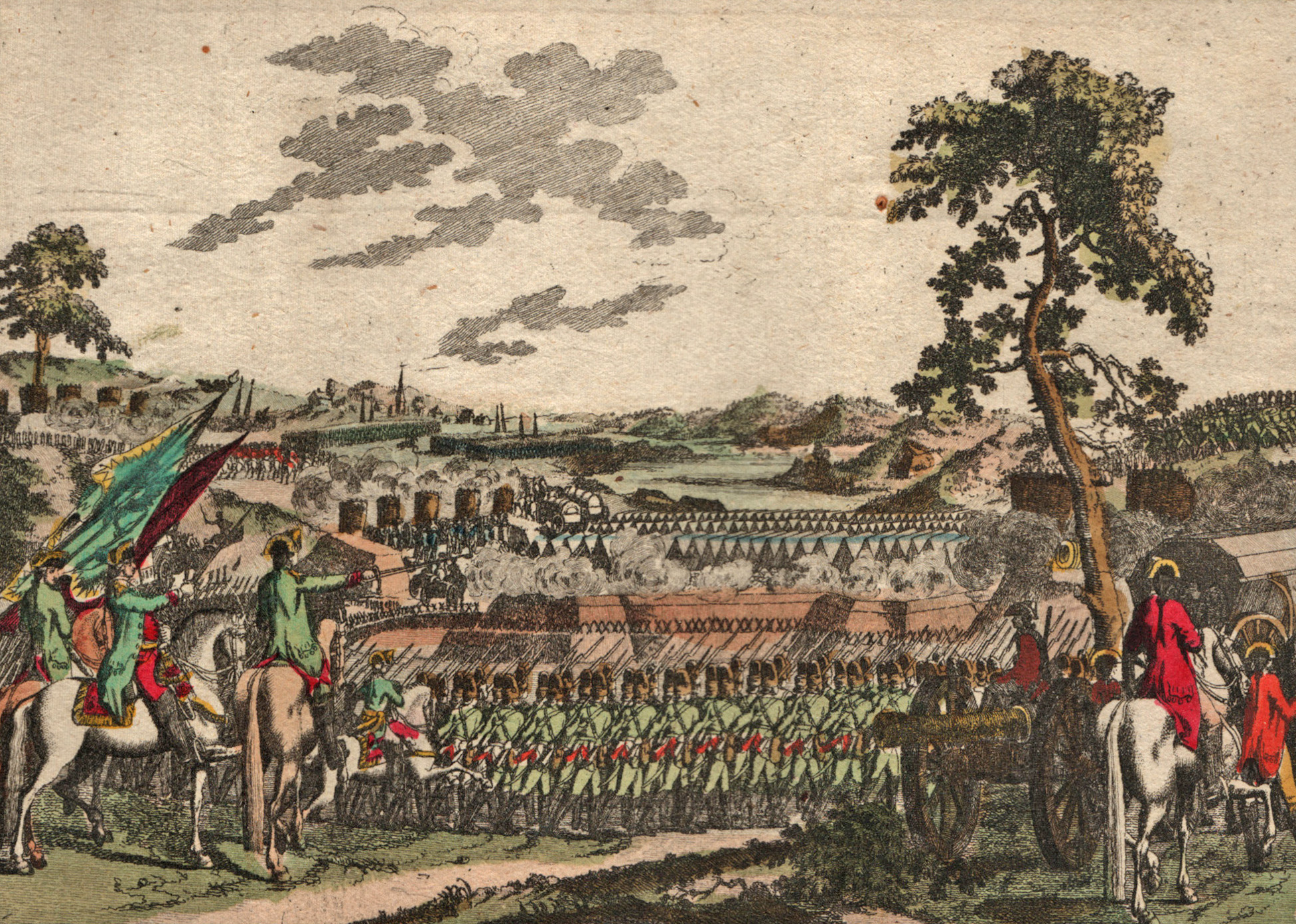
- Battle of Kyyrö and Porrassalmi, as depicted in Nordischer Kriegsschauplaz
Date	13 June 1789
Location	Porrassalmi, Finland
Result	Swedish victory

Belligerents
Sweden	(Russia) Russian Empire

Commanders and leaders
Jakob Karl Gripenberg	Ivan Ivanovich Michelson

Strength
750 men	5,000 men

Casualties and losses
53 killed, 150 wounded	425 killed and wounded (Russian sources); 900 killed and wounded (Swedish sources)

The Battle of Porrassalmi was fought near the bight of Porrassalmi in Savonia on 13 June 1789, during the Russo-Swedish War (1788–90). A Swedish force of about 750 men succeeded in stopping the northbound advance of a Russian force numbering 5,000 men.

The Swedish forces blocked the road to Mikkeli at a narrow watercrossing with a bridge near the bight of Porrassalmi. There they faced Russian infantrymen led by Ivan Ivanovich Michelson and Georg Magnus Sprengtporten a Swedish officer who had entered the Russian service and received the command of the Russian army corps directed against Finland. Sprengtporten persuaded the Russians that Finnish troops were disloyal to the Swedish Crown and not going to fight, but his column was met with gunfire. Only infantry units participated in the fighting. The Russians were moving in a too-close formation and, despite numerous charges against the outnumbered Swedes, could not break through the defence and pulled back, covered by mounted Cossacks and Bashkirs. The Russians lost 425 men killed and wounded, including their commander, General Georg Magnus Sprengtporten, who was seriously wounded, while the Swedes claimed to have killed and wounded 900. The Swedes lost in total 203 men dead or wounded. The battle brought to prominence Major Georg Carl von Döbeln, whose iconic black silk bandanna was worn over a wound suffered in the battle. Sprengtporten claimed that his defeat was due to a lack of cooperation between his officers and that the decision to leave the battlefield was unsound and taken without his consideration. He personally led a charge that succeeded in capturing a Swedish battery. Russian staff officer Ivan Sazonov, who also participated in the fighting, was said to have publicly praised the enemy's valour after the battle, although adding that it was only the enemy's advantageous defensive position that determined the outcome of the battle.
