= Bulat-Batır =

1928 film

- Directed by: Yuri Tarich; Vladimir Korsh-Sablin
- Written by: Natan Zarhi; Abdraxman Şakirov
- Starring: Vasiliy Yaroslavtsev; Ada Vojtsik; Ivan Klyukvin; Galina Kravchenko
- Cinematography: Grigori Giber, N. Sokolov, Vladimir Solodnikov (II)
- Distributed by: Sovkino; Tatkino
- Release date: 1928
- Country: Soviet Union
- Languages: = Silent film Russian intertitles Tatar intertitles

Bulat-Batır or Bulat-batyr (Russian: Була́т-Баты́р, Tatar: بولات باتر) is a 1928 silent historical drama film, believed to be the first Tatar film and probably the only Tatar full-length feature silent film. The film was shot mostly in Kazan, and the Kazan Kremlin was one of its stills. The film is devoted to the Pugachev rebellion and its alternative names include Pugachyovshchina (Russian: Пугачёвщина), Flames on the Volga and Revolt in Kazan.

The story was written by Abdraxman Şakirov, a young Communist from Agryz and the script was written by Natan Zarhi, a Soviet scenario writer. Yuri Tarich is also credited as a contributing writer.

== Plot ==
In the 18th century, a small Tatar village celebrates the Sabantuy festival. Orthodox monks, accompanied by soldiers, arrive with the intent to forcibly baptize the local Muslim population. The villagers resist, but the soldiers carry out a punitive action, killing the wife of the peasant Bulat and kidnapping his son Asfan. Bulat is left alone with his other son, Timur, and his adopted daughter, Asma.

Fifteen years later, Bulat becomes a well-known figure in the Pugachev Rebellion, gaining fame as a defender of the poor. With the help of his son Timur and adopted daughter Asma, Bulat fights alongside the rebels. Meanwhile, Asfan, who was raised among nobles and educated in the elite, receives a commission as an officer. He is given command of a punitive force tasked with suppressing the uprising in his native village of Chibilne, where his father and brother are part of the rebellion.

The events unfold in the Kazan province. Chibilne is likely a fictional village, as there was no village by that name in the Kazan province.

== Cast ==
- Vasiliy Yaroslavtsev as Bulat-Batır
- Ada Vojtsik as Asma
- Ivan Klyukvin as Asfan
- Galina Kravchenko as Elena von Brandt
- Naum Rogozhin as von Kanits
- Ivan Arkanov as Suleiman Murza
- Nikolai Vitovtov as Derzhavin
- Alexandr Zhukov as Timur
- Boris Yurtsev as Murat
- Eduard Kulganek as general Potyomkin, second cousin of Catherine II's favorite Grigory Potemkin
- Mstislav Kotelnikov as Beloborodov, emissary of Pugachov
- Tatyana Barysheva as genius of victory
- Kayum Pozdnyakov
- Lev Ivanov as Kayum
- Stepan Borisov as Yemelyan Pugachev

== Critical reception ==
It is known that after the premiere in Germany one White émigré Antonov-Ivanov attempted to burn a copy of the film in the "Concordia" cinema as a sign of protest against "Bolshevik Propaganda".

The film received a positive review from The New York Times praising it for the authentic atmosphere. Bryher praised the scenery and the cinematography.

== See also ==
- Bäxtiyär Qanqayev
