= Mari Forest =

National park of Russia

Mariy Chodra National Park
- IUCN category II (national park)
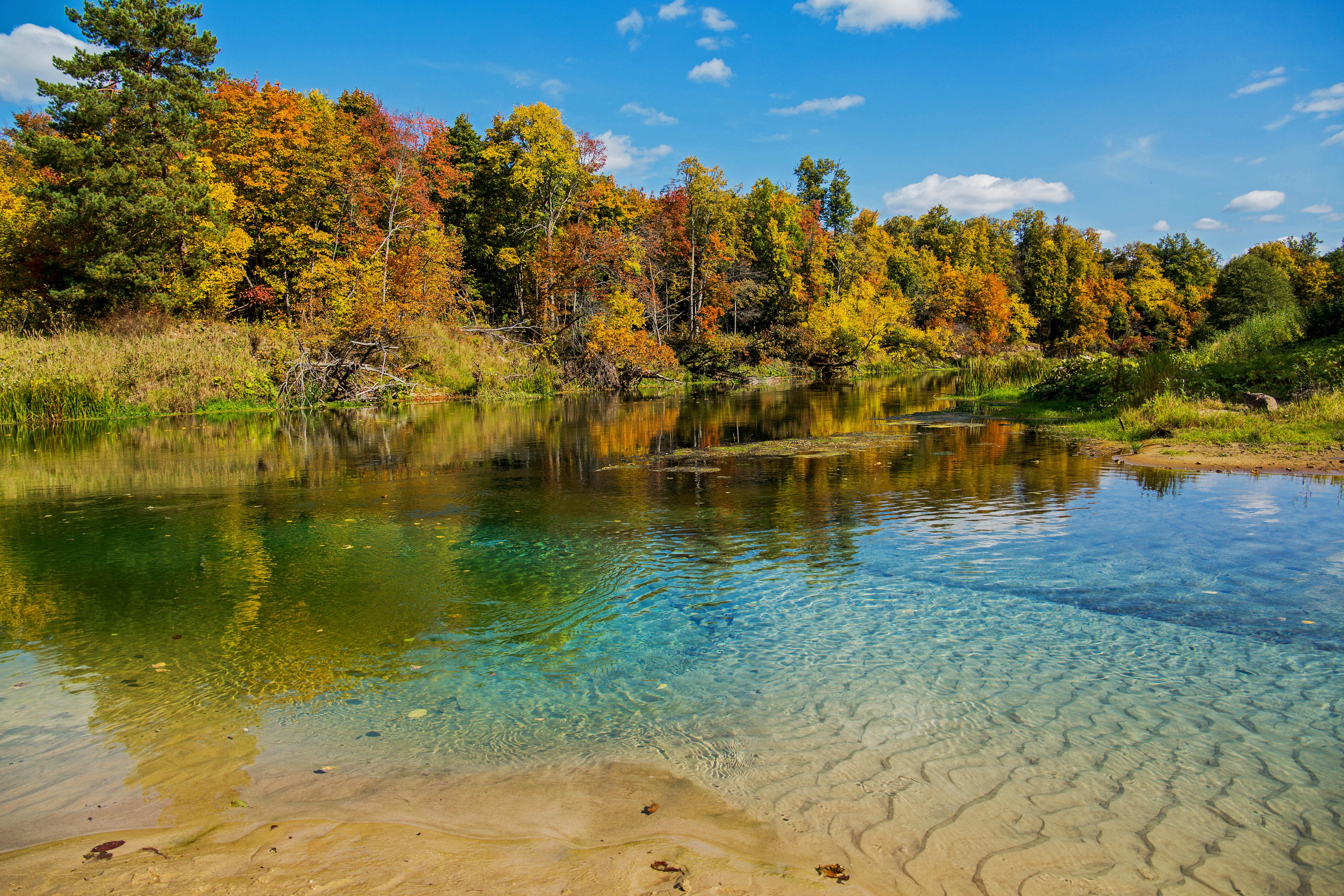

- Location within Russia
- Location: Mari El Republic, Russia
- Nearest city: Volzhsk
- Coordinates: 56°09′N 48°22′E
- Area: 366 km^{2} (141 sq mi)
- Established: 1985
- Website: http://www.xn----7sbbpsgsuof8e.xn--p1ai/

The Mari Forest or Mariy Chodra (Mari and Russian: Марий Чодра) is a national park, located largely in Morkinsky, Zvenigovsky, and Volzhsky Districts of the Mari El Republic, Russia. The park has an area of 366 square kilometers (141 mi^{2}) and was established in 1985.

== Flora and fauna ==
Mariy Chodra was created to protect rare plants: more than 115 rare plant species are documented. There are fourteen tourist routes in the park; the most popular attractions being Yalchik, Glukhoye, and Kichiyer Lakes, the rafting on the Ilet and Yushut Rivers, Pugachov's Oak, and the Maple Mountain.

There are more than fourteen tourist centers in Mariy Chodra, which play a major role in the recreation of the republics of Mari El, Tatarstan, and Chuvashia.
