= Pugachev's Oak =

Tree in Mari El, Russia

Coordinates: 56.1345°N 48.4684°E

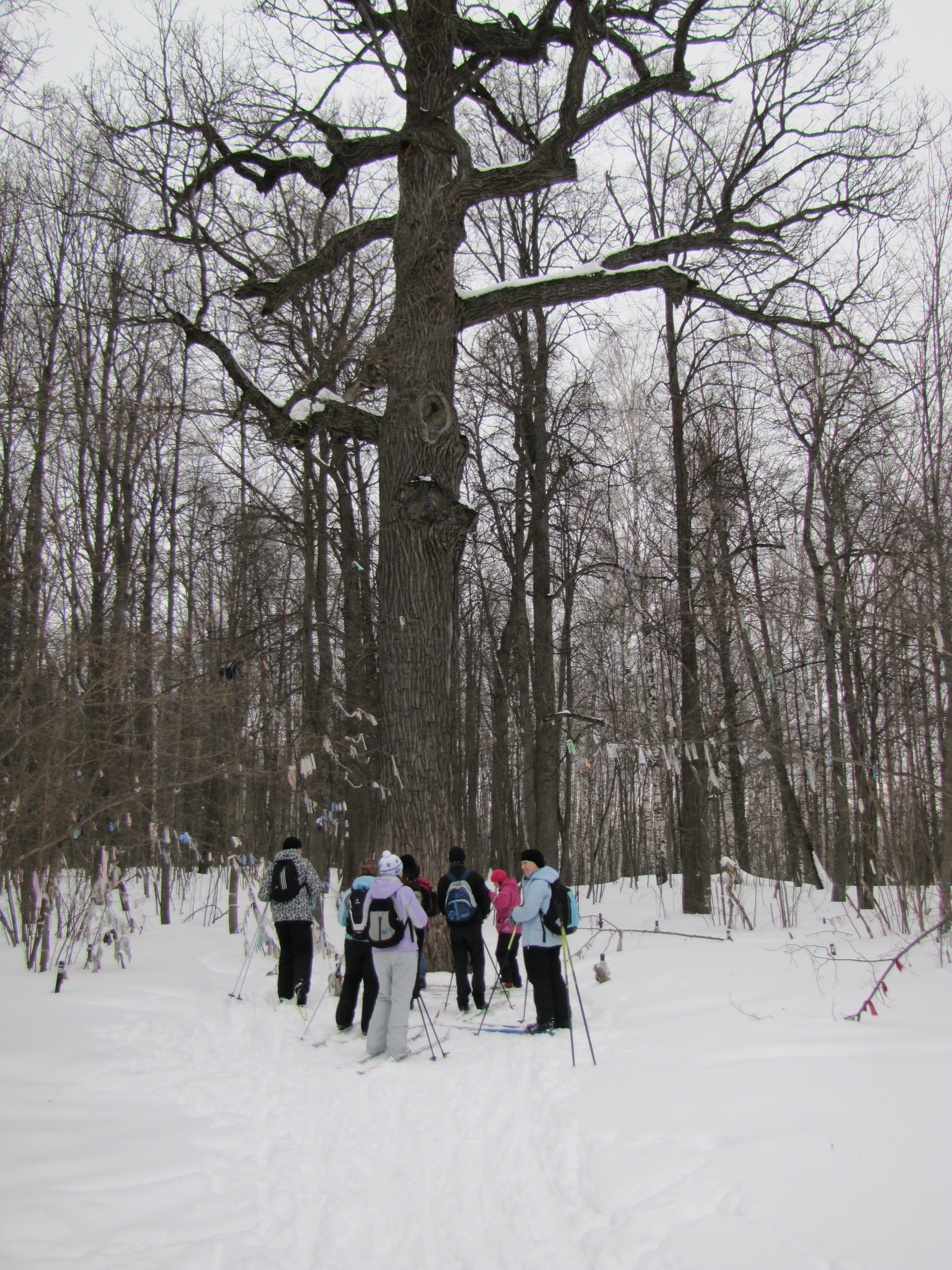
Pugachev's Oak and tourists around it

Pugachev's Oak (Meadow Mari: Пугачёв тумо, Russian: Дуб Пугачёва) is a major tree in Marii Chodra national park, Mari El Republic, Russian Federation. It is an oak tree that is estimated to date to about 1500. The tree is 1.2 m (3 ft 11 in) in diameter, and 26 m (85 ft) high.

Legend says that after their defeat in the battle of Kazan and retreat to the Mari forests, the rest of Pugachev's troops stayed under this oak, and Pugachev personally watched the burning of Kazan from this location.

However, there are doubts that this particular oak is the tree Pugachev's rebels stayed under. Some researchers estimate this tree's age to be younger, dating it to about 1650, implying it would have been an ordinary oak tree at the time of the Pugachev revolt in 1774.

Another major oak tree, estimated to date to about 1400, existed in the nearby fields until it died in the 1940s, and was cut down in the 1950s. It was possibly the original Pugachev's Oak.
