= Siege of Izmail (1807) =

Ottoman victory over Russia by the Danube

- Part of the Russo-Turkish War (1806–1812)
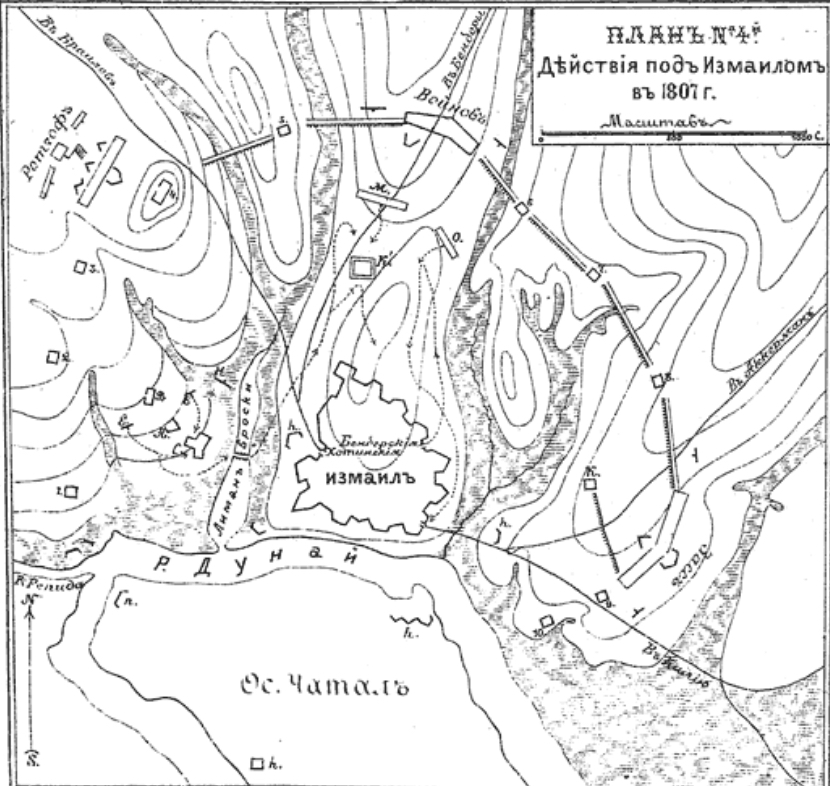
- Plan of military operations in the Izmail area
Date	2 March – 15 July 1807
Location	Izmail, Bessarabia, Ottoman Empire; Present-day Ukraine
Result	Ottoman victory

Belligerents
Ottoman Empire	Russia

Commanders and leaders
Pehlivan Ibrahim-Pasha; Abdulla Aga; Bakhadyr Girey	(Russian Empire) Johann von Michelsohnen (Russian Empire) Casimir Meindorf (Russian Empire) Alexander Langeron (Russian Empire) Grigory Zass

Strength
c. 8,000 to 20,000 (per prisoners); 9 cannons	c. 15,000; 58 cannons

The siege of Izmail was a military operation took place Spring–Summer 1807 during the Eighth Russo-Turkish War. The Russians besieged the fortress of Izmail on the Danube. They were unable to break its resistance until the conclusion of a truce (the Tilsit peace negotiations also demanded a cessation of actions against Turkey) and were forced to retreat.

== Background ==
The Russian Empire began a new Turkish war in November 1806, as the Ottomans violated the provisions of the Treaty of Jassy and interfered in the affairs of the Danubian Principalities without the knowledge of the Russians. After the invasion, the cities of Bucharest and Bender immediately fell, after which the cold winter conditions forced the Russians to cease hostilities.

=== Forces ===
Michelsohnen's corps, left to besiege the fortress, according to one of the participants in the siege, amounted to 14,000 to 15,000 men and 58 cannons. These forces did not have enough siege guns to launch an assault on the fortress, so the Russians limited themselves to a blockade. According to their data, there was a garrison of about 20,000 operating against the Russians, which is why it presented serious problems for the capture of the city. However, Langeron claims that the Izmail Garrison numbered 8,000 men, incl. 6,000 cavalry and 9 cannons.

== Siege ==
The siege saw several engagements with varying results. Already on March 2, the first major clash took place, the Turks staged a sortie to delay the start of the siege. Sources disagree on who was victorious. Turks claim that they won, while the Russians did the opposite, but their point of view is supported by the Frenchman Langeron. On March 17, another battle took place, the garrison tried to rout the division of Grigory Zass from two sides, he began a false retreat and led the Turks to the plain, where they began to fire several guns, as a result of the counterattack, all positions around the fortress were recaptured. Zass claimed 117 wounded and 7 dead on its side. The period from March to the end of April does not appear in the Turkish reports. At the end of April, reinforcements tried to break through from Kilia to help the besiegers, but Pehlivan intercepted them and forced them to retreat. The versions of the losses vary greatly, Pehlivan allegedly sent 500 prisoners and 1,500 heads to Istanbul, while the Russians claimed only 1 dead and 3 wounded. On April 2, the Turks made another major sortie, and as a result of the battle at the Kilia gate, it was repulsed. Nevertheless, the version presented by Pehlivan indicates that the sortie was successful and several Russian forts were destroyed. The last major event occurred on July 12, when Pehlivan attacked the advanced units of the besiegers with up to 3,000 forces, but after the reinforcements arrived, they fled, the Russians pursued him to the glacis, inflicting losses on the Turks of 800 people, losing 35 dead and 176 wounded.
