= Bolshaya Oka =

Bolshaya Oka Большая Ока
- Selo
- Location within Bashkortostan Location within Russia
- Coordinates: 56°04′N 58°11′E
- Country: Russia
- Region: Bashkortostan
- District: Mechetlinsky District
- Time zone: UTC+5:00

Bolshaya Oka (Russian: Большая Ока; Bashkir: Оло Аҡа, Olo Aqa) is a rural locality (a selo) and the administrative centre of Bolsheokinsky Selsoviet, Mechetlinsky District, Bashkortostan, Russia. The population was 1,064 as of 2010. There are 6 streets.

== Geography ==
Bolshaya Oka is located 17 km north of Bolsheustyikinskoye (the district's administrative centre) by road. Srednyaya Oka is the nearest rural locality.
