= Tufan Miñnullin =

Tatar writer and politician (1935–2012)

- Туфан Миңнуллин
- Born: August 25, 1935; Bol'shoe Meretkozino, Kamsko-Ustyinsky, Tatar ASSR, Russian SFSR, Soviet Union
- Died: May 2, 2012 (aged 76); Kazan, Tatarstan, Russia
- Education: Mikhail Shchepkin Higher Theatre School,
- Occupations: Screenwriter; writer; politician; playwright; opinion writer
- Writing career
- Notable awards: People's Artist of the RSFSR,

Miñnullin Tufan Ğabdulla ulı aka Tufan Miñnullin [tuˈfɑn miˈŋnulin] (Tatar: Туфан Габдулла улы Миңнуллин, Russian: Миннулин Туфан Абдуллович, Minnulin Tufan Abdullovich) was a famous Tatar writer, playwright, publicist, Tatarstan State Council deputy and honorary citizen of Kazan. He was a permanent member of State Council of the Republic of Tatarstan (Tatarstan parliament) since 1990. International PEN club member (since 1996).

He was born on 25 August 1935 in a Tatar family in the village of Bolshoe Meretkozino in the Tatarstan's Kamskoe Ustie region.

Miñnullin died on 2 May 2012.
