= Podolsky uezd =

Podolsky uezd (Russian: Подольский уезд, pre-reform orthography: Подольскій уѣздъ) was one of the subdivisions of the Moscow Governorate of the Russian Empire. It was situated in the southern part of the governorate. Its administrative centre was Podolsk.

== Demographics ==
At the time of the Russian Empire Census of 1897, the Podolsky uezd had a population of 86,311. Of these, 99.2% spoke Russian, 0.3% Polish, 0.1% Tatar, 0.1% German, 0.1% Ukrainian and 0.1% Yiddish as their native language.
