= Archa Darugha =

The Archa Darugha (Tatar: Арча даругасы) was a subdivision of the Kazan Khanate and the Kazan Uyezd in 16th–18th centuries. The center was the town of Archa. Its territory covered the basins of the Kazanka, Noqsa, Kinderle, Shapshe, Yamashirma, Norma, Kesmas, Qırlay, Kultas, Sarapul, Vyatka, Shushma, Sarda etc. rivers. For the most part, the possessions of Prikaz of Kazan Palace, monasteries and Serving Tatars were placed there in the 16th–18th centuries.
