= Savinovo =

Savinovo Савиново
- Selo
- Location within Altai Krai Location within Russia
- Coordinates: 52°30′N 84°51′E
- Country: Russia
- Region: Altai Krai
- District: Zonalny District
- Time zone: UTC+7:00

Savinovo (Russian: Савиново) is a rural locality (a selo) in Sokolovsky Selsoviet, Zonalny District, Altai Krai, Russia. The population was 539 as of 2013. There are 6 streets.

== Geography ==
Savinovo is located 26 km southwest of Zonalnoye (the district's administrative centre) by road. Zhavoronkovo is the nearest rural locality.
