= Philip Longworth =

British historian

Philip Longworth (b. 17 February 1933, London) is a British historian. He specializes in Russian history.

== Biography ==
Longworth was educated at Balliol College, Oxford receiving an M.A in 1960. He worked at the Central Asian Research Centre, London, the Commonwealth War Graves Commission, the University of Birmingham (as a lecturer in Russian history), and the University of London. From 1984 to 2003, he was professor of history at McGill University in Montreal, Canada.

He has published a number of books, and is particularly known as the author of a widely used standard work on the Cossacks (The Cossacks, first published in 1969). He was awarded Knight of Mark Twain for his book The Art of Victory (1965) about the Russian Generalissimo Suvorov-Rymniksky, Prince of Italia. Several of his books have gone through multiple editions and have also been translated into German. He translated Mikhail Lermontov's A Hero of Our Time into English. He wrote the foreword to the photo book Russland und die Sowjetunion. Ein Jahrhundert in Fotografien der Nachrichtenagentur TASS, 'Russia and the Soviet Union: A Century in Photographs from the TASS News Agency', by Peter Radetsky.

== Works ==
- The Art of Victory. The Life and Achievements of Generalissimo Suvorov. 1729–1800. London: Constable. 1965. ISBN 978-0-09-451170-5.
  - P.S.: The following year's edition (Rinehart & Company, New York) uses "Field-Marshal" in the title instead of "Generalissimo."
- Confrontations with Judaism: a Symposium (ed.). London: Blond. 1967.
- The Unending Vigil: The History of the Commonwealth War Graves Commission. Barnsley: Pen & Sword. 2010 [1967].
- The Cossacks. London. 1969.
  - (in German) Die Kosaken. Legende und Geschichte. Mit einer Einführung von Hellmut Diwald. (Menschen und Mächte – Geschichte im Blickpunkt). König Verlag, München 1973, ISBN 3-8082-0056-1.
- The Three Empresses: Catherine I, Anne and Elizabeth of Russia. London: Constable. 1972.
- The Rise and Fall of Venice
  - (in German) Aufstieg und Fall der Republik Venedig. Brockhaus, Wiesbaden 1976
- Alexis, Tsar of all the Russias. Franklin Watts. 1984. ISBN 978-0-531-09770-0.
- The Making of Eastern Europe. London: Macmillan. 1994.
- Russia's Empires: Their Rise and Fall from Prehistory to Putin. John Murray Publishers. ISBN 0-7195-6204-X.
