= Ivan Mikhelson =

Russian general (1740–1807)

Ivan Ivanovich Mikhelson
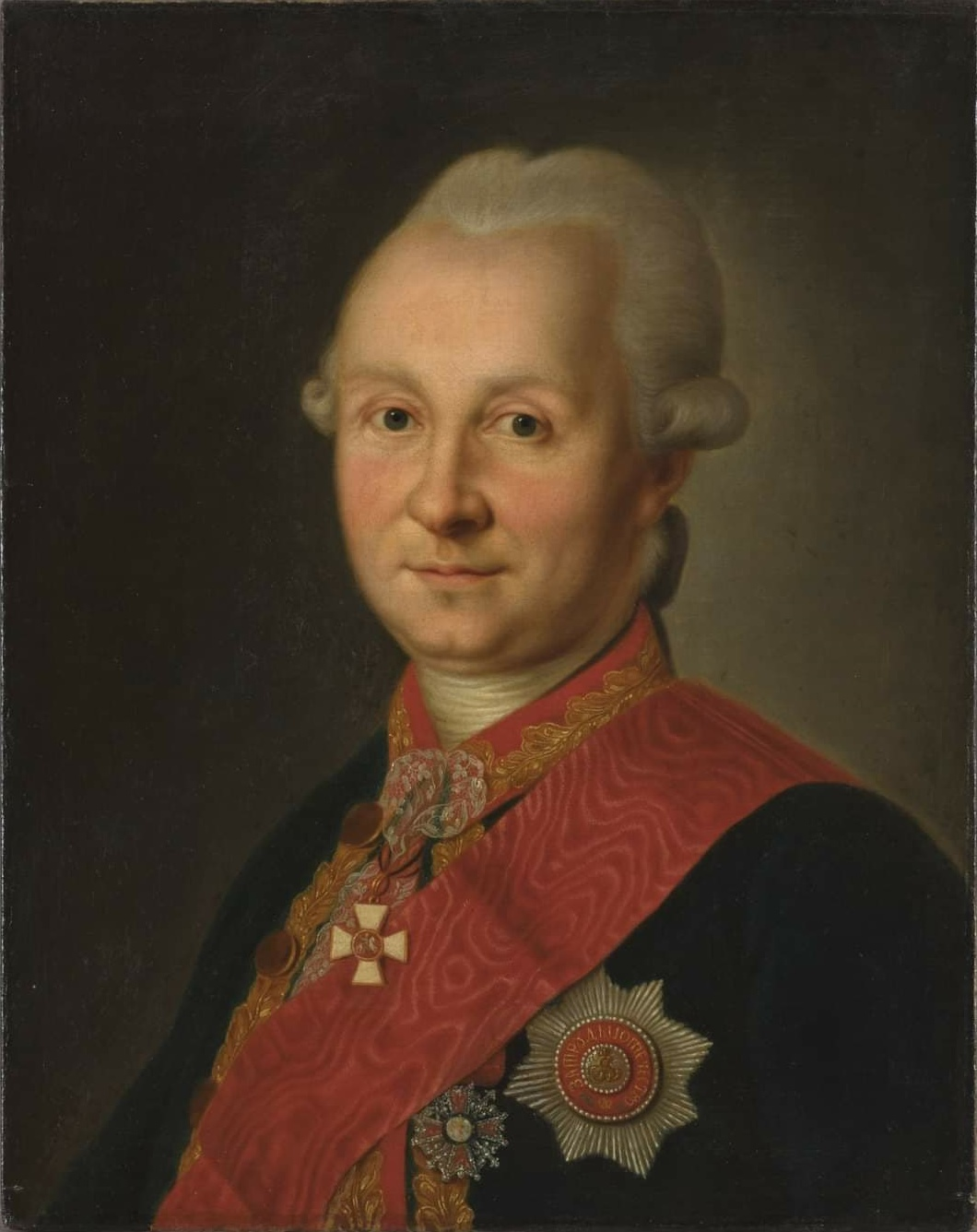
- Portrait by an unknown painter (after 1778)
- Born: 14 May [O.S. 3 May] 1740
- Died: 17 August [O.S. 5 August] 1807 (aged 67)
- Other name: Johann von Michelsohn (or Michelsohnen)
- Relatives: House of Mikhelsohn
- Military career
- Allegiance: Russia
- Branch: Imperial Russian Army
- Rank: General of the cavalry
- Conflicts: Pugachev's Rebellion; Battle of Kazan (1774); Battle of Tsaritsyn (1774); Battle of Solenikova; Russo-Swedish War (1788–1790); Battle of Porrassalmi; Russo-Turkish War (1806–1812); Siege of Izmail (1807); Battle of Turbat

Ivan Ivanovich Mikhelson (Russian: Ива́н Ива́нович Михельсо́н; 14 May [O.S. 3 May] 1740 – 17 August [O.S. 5 August] 1807) was a Russian military commander who rose to the rank of general and participated in several important wars. His most noted contribution was the suppressing of Pugachev's Rebellion for which he received numerous honours.

== Early career ==
Mikhelson was born in Reval (now Tallinn) to a family of noble rank (known in German as von Michelsohnen). His paternal ancestor Iosif M. hailed from England and had served the Danish and Swedish armies, becoming an adjutant of Carl XI (1680). Iosif's son Ivan served Carl XII as captain and fell at Poltava in 1709. Ivan's sons Ivan and Nikolai remained in Russia and entered Russian service. Ivan Ivanovich Mikhelson was the son of this Ivan. His early military career saw him serve as a cavalry officer in many conflicts: the Seven Years' War, the Russo-Turkish War of 1768–1774, and the war against the Bar Confederation.

== Pugachev's Rebellion ==
By the end of 1773 Mikhelson held the rank of lieutenant-colonel of the Saint-Petersburg Regiment of Carabineers, and, after the new force arrived in rebel-occupied territory, was given command over a force of soldiers to fight against the rebels led by Yemelyan Pugachev, who by this time had gained a fearsome reputation and defeated several expeditions sent against him by the government. Soon enough events turned around due to Mikhelson's exceptional resolve, especially his indefatigability when confronting followers of the rebellion, whom he crushed wherever he encountered them. His most decisive action was at the Battle of Kazan, where he led the relief force to the besieged city. By the time Michelson had arrived on July 13, Pugachev's army had already surrounded the Kazan Kremlin where the remaining defenders and loyal citizens had taken refuge. Mikhelson launched a determined strike on the rebels, and thereafter pursued them across the right bank of the Volga river. He refused to relent, and as the rebels attempted to regroup near Tsaritsyn, drove his small army of under 5,000 men to engage Pugachev near Chyorny Yar on August 25, in the Battle of Solenikova, where he annihilated a force of 10,000 rebels, killing 2,000 and capturing 6,000 more, suffering only 90 casualties to his forces in the process. Mikhelson had managed to end any major threat of the rebellion reemerging and assaulting the Russian interior.

== Promotions ==
In 1774, Mikhelson received an indygenat (authorization) from the Polish Diet regarding noble status.

For his services in suppressing the revolt, Catherine the Great awarded Mikhelson with numerous honors: an estate in Vitebsk Governorate, the Gold Sword for Bravery with Diamonds, and the rank of full colonel. On 12 February 1775 Michelson has been given the Cross 3rd class of the Order of St. George (no mention of the Pugachev's uprising has been made in the decree). In 1775, he commanded the Military Order Cuirassier Regiment, then the Life-Cuirassier Regiment the following year. In 1778, he was promoted to major general, and awarded the Order of St. Alexander Nevsky, in 1781, he was given the honorary post of major in the Life Guard Horse Regiment, and in 1786 was made a lieutenant general.

== Russo-Swedish War ==
With the outbreak of war against Sweden, Mikhelson was given command of a corps in the army of General Valentin Platonovich Musin-Pushkin. Mikhelson and Sprengtporten commanded Russian infantry at the Battle of Porrassalmi (13 June 1789) which ended in a defeat.

== Later career ==
In 1797, he was promoted to general of the cavalry. In 1803, he was given command of the Belorussian Military Governorate, managing the civil administration of Mogilev and Vitebsk Governorates. In 1805, he was entrusted with command over forces assembled on Russia's western borders, and the next year command over the Dnieper Army, destined for the coming campaign against the Ottomans, who eventually declared war on Russia in December 1806.

For successfully completing the first part of the campaign in the Russo-Turkish War, he was awarded the Order of St. Andrew. He failed to take Izmail (March – July 1807). While his army occupied Moldavia, General von Mikhelson died suddenly at Bucharest on 17 August 1807. His body was transported back to Ivanovo (today in Pskov Oblast), the estate awarded to him by Empress Catherine after Pugachev's Rebellion. His grave was razed in the aftermath of the Russian Revolution.

== Sources ==
- "Михельсон, Иван Иванович" . Brockhaus and Efron Encyclopedic Dictionary (in Russian). 1906.
- Mandich, Donald R.; Placek, Joseph Anthony (1992). Russian Heraldry and Nobility. Ryton Publications. p. 315. ISBN 978-0-9633063-9-5. "Ivan Ivanovich Mikhelson"
- Списки воинскому департаменту, исправленные по 1771, 1776, 1779, 1780б 1781, 1782, 1783, 1784, и т. д. гг.
- Военно-походный журнал командира карательного корпуса подполковника Михельсона И. И. о боевых действиях против повстанцев в марте — августе 1774 г. // Крестьянская война 1773—1775 гг. в России. Документы из собрания Государственного исторического музея. — М.: Наука, 1973. — С. 194—223.
- Ореус И. И. Иван Иванович Михельсон, победитель Пугачева. 1740—1807 // Русская старина, 1876. — Т. 15, № 1. — С. 192—209.
- Серков А. И. Русское масонство. 1731—2,000 (Энциклопедический словарь). — М.: РОССПЭН, 2001.
- Additional information taken from the Brockhaus and Efron Encyclopedic Dictionary (1890—1907).
