= Yemelyan Pugachev =

Russian Cossack rebel leader (1742–1775)

- Емельян Пугачёв
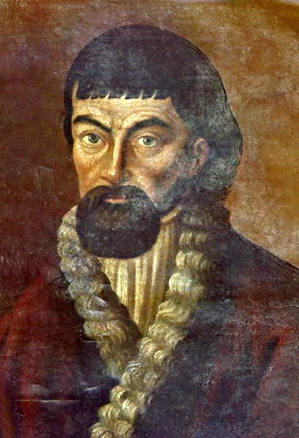
- Portrait by an unknown artist from Simbirsk (1774)
- Born: c. 1742 present-day Kotelnikovsky District, Volgograd Oblast
- Died: 1775 (aged 32–33); Moscow, Russian Empire
- Other name: Claimed to be Emperor Peter III
- Occupation: Leader of a Russian peasant uprising

Yemelyan Ivanovich Pugachev (also spelled Pugachyov; Russian: Емельян Иванович Пугачёв; c. 1742 – 21 January [O.S. 10 January] 1775) was an ataman of the Yaik Cossacks and the leader of the Pugachev's Rebellion, a major popular uprising in the Russian Empire during the reign of Catherine the Great.

The son of a Don Cossack landowner, Pugachev served in the Imperial Russian Army during the Seven Years' War and the Russo-Turkish War of 1768–1774. In 1770 he deserted the Russian military and spent years as a fugitive, gaining popularity among the peasants, Cossacks and Old Believers against a backdrop of intensified unrest. In 1773, he initiated open revolt against Catherine. Claiming to be Catherine's late husband Tsar Peter III, Pugachev proclaimed an end to serfdom and amassed a large army. His forces quickly overran much of the region between the Volga and the Urals, and in 1774 they captured Kazan and burned the city to the ground. In August 1774, General Johann von Michelsohnen inflicted a crushing defeat on the rebels at Tsaritsyn. Pugachev was captured soon after by his own Cossacks and turned over to the authorities. He was then sent to Moscow and executed in January 1775. Alexander Pushkin wrote a notable history of the rebellion, The History of Pugachev, and recounted the events of the uprising in his novel The Captain's Daughter (1836).

== Early life ==
Pugachev, the son of a small Don Cossack landowner, was the youngest son of four children. Born in the stanitsa Zimoveyskaya (in present-day Volgograd Oblast), he signed on to military service at the age of 17. One year later, he married a Cossack girl, Sofya Nedyuzheva, with whom he had five children, two of whom died in infancy. Shortly after his marriage, he joined the Russian Second Army in Prussia during the Seven Years' War under the command of Count Zakhar Chernyshov. He returned home in 1762, and for the next seven years divided his time between his home village and several service assignments. During this period, he was recognised for his military skill and achieved the Cossack rank of khorunzhiy, which would be roughly equivalent to the post of company commander. It was also during this period, in 1770 at the siege of Bender during the Russo-Turkish War, that he first displayed a flair for impersonation, boasting to his comrades that his sword was given to him by his "godfather", Peter I.

== Life as a fugitive ==
In 1770, Pugachev requested leave to return home to recover from a severe illness, later seeking permanent discharge. Despite urging from military commanders, Pugachev refused to be treated in a military infirmary or return to the front. Convinced by his brother-in-law, Simon Pavlov, he joined a dissatisfied Cossack group who were fleeing eastward for an independent Cossack community on the Terek River. After they were safely across the Don River, he returned home to Zimoveyskaya. The fleeing Cossacks were caught soon after by the authorities, and Pavlov implicated Pugachev in the desertion, causing his arrest. He was held for 48 hours before he managed to escape, beginning his fugitive career. Fleeing for the Cossack community on the Terek River, he arrived in early January 1772. During his six weeks in the area, he joined a protest group and was elected their official representative. On his way to St. Petersburg to make an official complaint, his fugitive status was discovered in Mozdok, and he was again arrested. He escaped on 13 February and returned home, only to be arrested once again. Dispatched to Cherkassk for investigation, he met Lukyan Ivanovich Khudiakov, whom he tricked into releasing him, after which he fled to Vetka, a Polish border settlement, with the help of many Old Believers. He returned to Russia in the autumn of 1772 by pretending to be an Old Believer wishing to return home. He received a visa to settle in the Malykovka district (present day Volsk), where he most likely first heard of the Yaik Cossacks' rebellion.

== Insurrection 1773–1774 ==
The idea of impersonating the late Emperor Peter III occurred to Pugachev early on, even before he reached the Yaik Cossacks. It is of no surprise, given another recent peasant impersonator, Fedot Bogmolov, and Russia's history of impersonators. Pugachev, posing as a wealthy merchant, reportedly tested the feelings of the Cossacks at the Yaitsk by suggesting that he led a mass exodus into Turkey. When the majority seemed to agree with his plan, he deemed it the right time to begin his rebellion. Though he was arrested shortly after once again, and this time held for five months at Kazan, he escaped once more and returned to the Yaitsk to start his revolt. By promising to return several privileges to the Cossacks and to restore the Old Belief, he was able to gain the support he needed to promote his identity as Peter III. The story of Pugachev's strong resemblance to the Tsar Peter III, who in 1762 was overthrown and murdered by his wife's supporters, the future empress Catherine II, comes from a later legend. Pugachev told the story that he and his principal adherents had escaped from the clutches of Catherine.

Having amassed an army through propaganda, recruitment and promise of reform, Pugachev and his generals were able to overrun much of the region stretching between the Volga River and the Urals. Pugachev's greatest victory of the insurgency was the taking of Kazan. As well as amassing large numbers of Cossacks and peasants, Pugachev also acquired artillery and arms and was able to supply his force better than the Russian army would have predicted. Pugachev established a "College of War" consisting of four "judges" to handle the organization of the rebel army. The College of War had its own treasury to pay wages to the Cossacks and issue special bounties. Having won over many industrial peasants in the Urals, the College gave them funds to acquire raw materials and repair broken machines. Although the rebels managed to have some cannons and ammunition manufactured this way, economic activity in the rebel areas could not be sustained because of the lack of money.

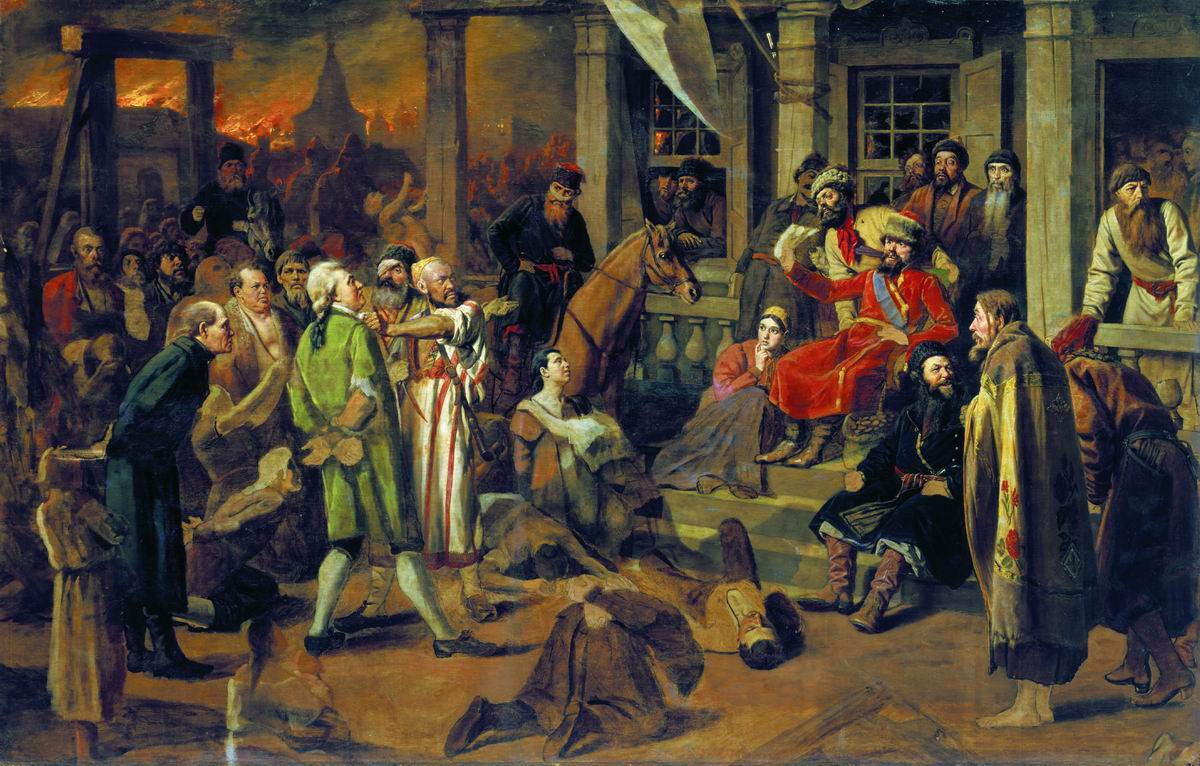
Pugachev Administering Justice to the Population. Painting by Vasily Perov.

General Pyotr Panin set out against the rebels with a large army, but difficulty of transport, lack of discipline, and the gross insubordination of his ill-paid soldiers paralysed all his efforts for months, while Pugachev's innumerable and ubiquitous bands gained victories in nearly every engagement. Not until August 1774 did General Michelsohn inflict a crushing defeat upon the rebels near Tsaritsyn; ten thousand were killed or taken prisoner. After the capture of Penza, Panin's committed savage reprisals against the rebels. On 14 September 1774, Pugachev's own Cossacks delivered him to Yaitsk. Alexander Suvorov had him placed in a metal cage and sent first to Simbirsk and then to Moscow for a public execution, which took place on 21 January [O.S. 10 January] 1775. In Bolotnaya Square in the centre of Moscow, he was decapitated and then drawn and quartered in public.

== Legacy ==
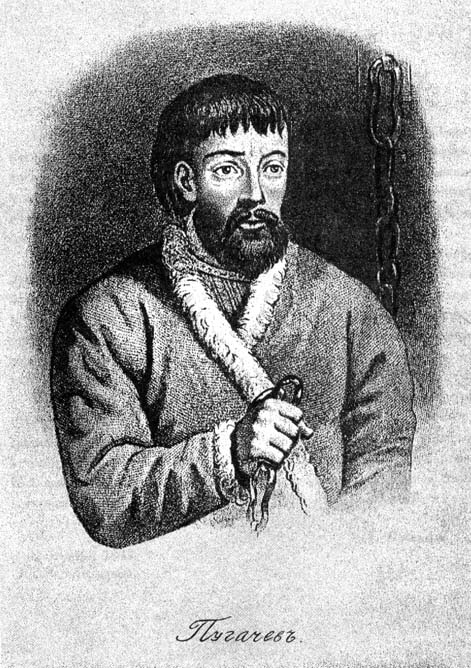
Portrait of Pugachev included in Alexander Pushkin's History of Pugachev, 1834

The Pugachev rebellion had a long-lasting effect on Russia for years to come. While Catherine II tried to reform the provincial administration, the horrors of the revolt caused her to drop other reforms, particularly attempts to emancipate the peasant serfs of Russia.

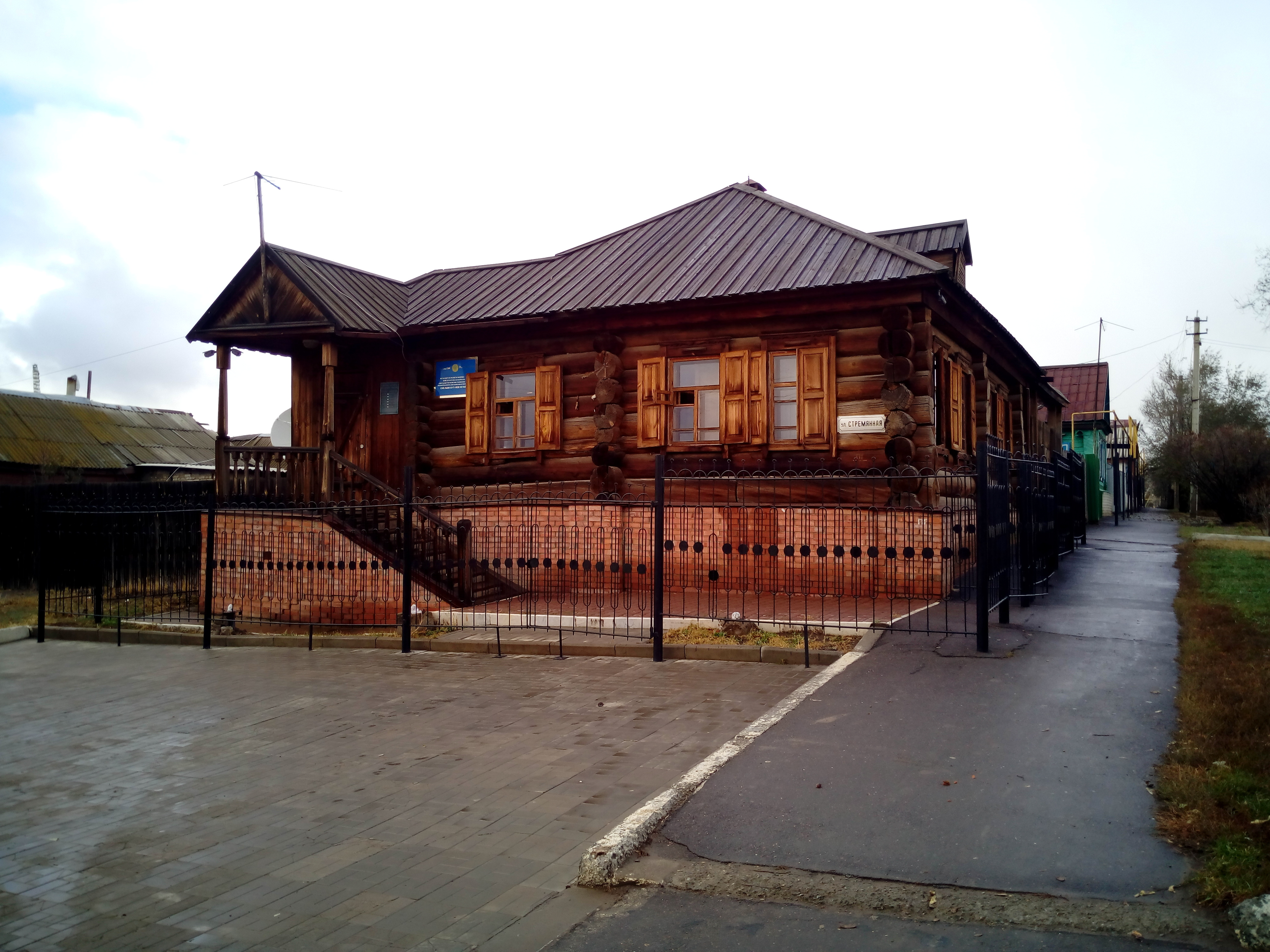
Yemelyan Pugachev's House Museum in Uralsk, 2015

The Russian writer Alexander Radishchev, in his Journey from St. Petersburg to Moscow, attacked the Russian government, in particular the institution of serfdom. In the book, he refers to Pugachev and the rebellion as a warning.

The term "Pugachevs of the University" was frequently used to describe the generation of the Russian Nihilist movement.

The village (stanitsa) in which Pugachev was born, whose original name "Zimoveyskaya" was changed after his defeat to Potemkinskaya, was renamed Pugachevskaya in his honor in 1917, following the October Revolution.

The central square in the Kazakh town of Uralsk is named Pugachev Square.

Yemelyan Pugachev's House Museum in Uralsk, was established in 1991.

Authors such as Boris Akunin have referred to Pugachevshchina as a tendency in the Russian culture toward rebellious discontent.

A fictionalised account of the rebellion is presented in Alexander Pushkin's 1836 novella The Captain's Daughter. This was in part the basis of the 1958 film Tempest, which starred Van Heflin as Pugachev.

The 1928 silent film Bulat-Batyr (directed by Yuri Tarich) is devoted to the Pugachev rebellion.

In the Hulu series The Great, Pugachev (played by Nicholas Hoult) is portrayed as a decoy of Peter III (also played by Hoult) who often steals things from the palace. He is stabbed seemingly to death by Catherine at the end of the second season, but is then revealed to be alive, setting the stage for his rebellion in the third season.

== See also ==
- Pugachev's Oak
- Pugachev
- False Dmitry I
- False Dmitry II
- False Dmitry III
- Princess Tarakanova
- Romanov impostors

== Sources ==
- Alexander, John T. (1969). Autocratic politics in a national crisis: the Imperial Russian Government and Pugachev's Revolt, 1773–1775. Bloomington: Indiana University Press.
- Alexander, John T. (1973). Emperor Of The Cossacks: Pugachev and the Frontier Jacquerie of 1773–1775. Lawrence, Kansas: Coronado Press.
- Longworth, Philip (1970). The Cossacks. New York: Holt, Rinehart and Winston. ISBN 978-0-03-081855-4.
- Longworth, Philip (1975). "The Pretender Phenomenon in Eighteenth Century Russia". Past & Present (66). Oxford University Press: 61–84. doi:10.1093/past/66.1.61. eISSN 1477-464X. ISSN 0031-2746.
- Pushkin, Aleksandr Sergeevich (1983). The History of Pugachev. Translated by Sampson, Early. Ann Arbor: Ardis Publishing. ISBN 9780882336251.
- Summner, B.H. (1928). "New Material on the Pugachev Revolt". Slavonic and East European Review (19). Modern Humanities Research Association and University College London, School of Slavonic and East European Studies: 121–122. eISSN 2222-4327. ISSN 0037-6795.

=== In other languages ===
- Akademiia nauk SSSR [Academy of Sciences of the Soviet Union] (1975). Intistorii SSSR [History of the USSR] (in Russian). Moscow: Tsentralʹnyi gosudarstvennyi arkhiv drevnikh aktov SSSR [Central government archive of ancient acts of the USSR].
- Catherine II. Political Correspondence (in Russian, French, and German). Petersburg. [1885, &c.]
- Dokumenty stavki EI Pugacheva, povstancheskikh vlastei i uchrezhdenii, 1773–1774 gg (in Russian).
- Dubrovin, N. (1884). Pugachiev and his Associates (in Russian). Petersburg.
- Gnyedich, S.I. (1902). Emilian Pugachev (in Russian). Petersburg.
- Palmer, Elena (2005). Peter III – Der Prinz von Holstein (in German). Erfurt, Germany: Sutton Publishing. ISBN 978-3-89702-788-6.
- Pugachevshchina [Dark Deeds of Pugachev] (in Russian). Moscow: Gosizdat. [1926–1931]
