= The Captain's Daughter (disambiguation) =

The Captain's Daughter is an 1836 novel by Alexander Pushkin.

The Captain's Daughter may also refer to:

- The Captain's Daughter (painting), an 1873 painting by James Tissot
- The Captain's Daughter (opera), a 1911 Russian opera by Cui
- The Captain's Daughter (album), an album by Eight Bells
- The Captain's Daughter (1947 film), an Italian adventure film
- The Captain's Daughter (1958 film), a Soviet drama film
- The Captain's Daughter, a slang term for the cat o' nine tails used onboard ships.
