= The Captain's Daughter (1958 film) =

1958 film

- Russian poster
- Russian: Капитанская дочка
- Directed by: Vladimir Kaplunovskiy
- Written by: Alexander Pushkin; Nikolai Kovarsky
- Produced by: Nikolai Vladimirov
- Starring: Oleg Strizhenov; Sergei Lukyanov; Iya Arepina; Vladimir Dorofeyev; Irina Zarubina
- Cinematography: Emil Gulidov
- Edited by: Lyudmila Pechieva
- Music by: Tikhon Khrennikov
- Production company: Mosfilm
- Release date: 1958
- Running time: 106 minutes
- Country: Soviet Union
- Language: Russian

The Captain's Daughter (Russian: Капитанская дочка, romanized: Kapitanskaya dochka) is a 1958 Soviet drama film directed by Vladimir Kaplunovskiy. The film is an adaptation of the historical novel The Captain's Daughter (1836) by Alexander Pushkin.

== Plot ==
The film tells the story of the nobleman Grinyov, going to military service in the fortress, where he falls in love with the commander's daughter, Maria, and fights for her in a duel. After that, Yemelyan Pugachev organizes Pugachev's Rebellion, conquers the fortress and executes Maria's parents, but he gives Grinev freedom. Soon he learns that Pugachev's accomplice forces Maria to marry him...

== Cast ==
- Oleg Strizhenov as Pyotr Grinyov
- Sergei Lukyanov as Yemelyan Pugachyov
- Iya Arepina as Masha Mironova
- Vladimir Dorofeyev as Ivan Kuzmich
- Irina Zarubina as Vasilisa Yegorovna
- Anatoli Shishkov as Savelyich
- Vyacheslav Shalevich as Shvabrin
- Pavel Pavlenko as Ivan Ignatyevich
- Boris Novikov as Maksimych
