= Tatiana Kharlova =

Tatiana Grigorievna Kharlova (1756–1773), was a Russian noblewoman killed during the Pugachev's Rebellion. Her death attracted much attention.

She was the daughter of colonel Grigory Mironovich Elagin, commandant of the Tatishchevo Fortress, and Anisya Semyonovna. In 1773, she married Zakhar Ivanovich Kharlov (1734–1773), commandant of the Nizhneozernoye Fortress.

On 22 September 1773, informed that the rebel army of Yemelyan Pugachev was marching toward Nizhneozernoye, Kharlova and her younger brother Nikolai was sent by her spouse back to her parents, where they were thought to be safer. Four days later, the Nizhneozernoye Fortress was taken by Pugachev and her husband executed. On 27 September, Pugachev attacked and took the Tatishchevo Fortress as well. Her parents were executed, with her father reportedly skinned, while Tatiana and her little brother was initially spared and taken prisoner. Contemporary sensational propaganda claimed that Kharlova was raped before the eyes of her husband, but this was evidently not true. She was however evidently taken as a concubine by Pugachev. On 4 November, Tatiana Grigorievna Kharlova was killed, along with her brother, by some Cossacks in the retinue of Pugachev, reportedly because they felt that Pugachev had been too lenient toward her, "loved her" too much, and feared the consequences of any future testimony she could give. In a testimony given the following year, Pugachev claimed that his soldiers had killed Kharlova because he loved her too much, and that he lamented what had happened.

The fate of Kharlova was mentioned by contemporary sensational press and attracted much attention during the Pugachev's Rebellion. It was famously described by Alexander Pushkin in Pugachev's history.
