= The Captain's Daughter (1947 film) =

1947 film

- Film poster
- Directed by: Mario Camerini
- Written by: Alexander Pushkin; Mario Camerini; Mario Monicelli; Carlo Musso; Ivo Perilli; Steno
- Produced by: Dino De Laurentiis
- Starring: Irasema Dilián; Amedeo Nazzari; Vittorio Gassman
- Cinematography: Aldo Tonti
- Edited by: Mario Camerini
- Music by: Fernando Previtali
- Production company: Lux Film
- Distributed by: Lux Film
- Release date: 8 October 1947
- Running time: 90 minutes
- Country: Italy
- Language: Italian

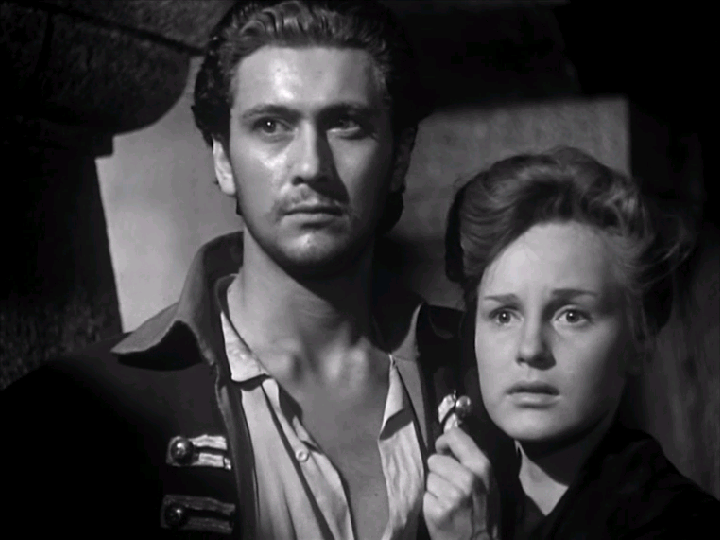
Cesare Danova and Irasema Dilian in The Captain's Daughter (1947)

The Captain's Daughter (Italian: La figlia del capitano) is a 1947 Italian historical adventure film directed by Mario Camerini and starring Irasema Dilián, Amedeo Nazzari and Vittorio Gassman. It was one of a number of ambitious historical epics made in the wake of the successful 1946 film The Black Eagle. The film's sets were designed by the art director Piero Filippone. It was entered into the 1947 Cannes Film Festival. It is based on the 1836 novel of the same name by Alexander Pushkin, which is set in Russia during the reign of Catherine II. It takes place during the Cossack Rebellion.

== Cast ==
- Irasema Dilián as Maria Ivanovna "Masha" Mironova
- Amedeo Nazzari as Yemelyan Pugachev, false tsar Peter III
- Vittorio Gassman as Alexey Ivanovich Shvabrin
- Cesare Danova as Pyotr Andreyevich Grinyov
- Aldo Silvani as capitain Ivan Kuzmich Mironov, father of Masha
- Ave Ninchi as Vasilisa Yegorovna Mironova, mother of Masha
- Ernesto Almirante as Savelyich, servant of Grinyov
- Olga Solbelli as Catherine II
- Carlo Ninchi as Zurin
- Laura Gore as Palashka
- Gualtiero Tumiati as Andrey Petrovich Grinev, father of Pyotr

== Bibliography ==
- Curti, Roberto. Riccardo Freda: The Life and Works of a Born Filmmaker. McFarland, 2017.
- Moliterno, Gino. The A to Z of Italian Cinema. Scarecrow Press, 2009.
