= A Step =

Step
- Russian: Шаг
- Directed by: Alexander Mitta
- Written by: Yoshiki Iwama; Viktor Merezhko; Alexander Mitta; Vladimir Tsvetov
- Starring: Leonid Filatov; Komaki Kurihara; Oleg Tabakov; Elena Yakovleva; Goh Watanabe
- Cinematography: Valeriy Shuvalov
- Edited by: Nadezhda Veselovskaya
- Music by: Igor Kefalidi; Igor Nazaruk; Alfred Schnittke
- Production companies: Mosfilm; Shigoto Film Production
- Release date: 1988
- Running time: 144 minutes
- Countries: Soviet Union; Japan
- Language: Russian

A Step (Russian: Шаг, romanized: Shag) is a 1988 Soviet drama film directed by Alexander Mitta.

The film is set in 1959 Japan, where a grieving mother defies bureaucratic barriers and journeys to the Soviet Union to secure a life-saving polio vaccine, determined to protect her child and countless others amidst a devastating epidemic.

== Plot ==
Set in 1959, during a devastating polio epidemic in Japan that leaves thousands of children dead or disabled, the film follows the story of Keiko, a grieving mother determined to save her younger son after losing her eldest.

With the Salk vaccine used in Japan proving only 60% effective and in short supply, Keiko embarks on a daring journey to the Soviet Union to obtain a new vaccine developed by Dr. Gusev. This Soviet vaccine is not only 100% effective but also completely safe. Keiko manages to secure a dose for her son and purchase an additional thousand doses for her compatriots, but upon her return to Japan, the vaccine is confiscated at customs. Japanese law requires all imported medicines to undergo a lengthy two-year approval process.

As Japanese mothers stage protests demanding immediate use of the Soviet vaccine, bureaucratic obstacles on both sides threaten to delay its distribution. Through Keiko's relentless efforts and the collaboration of Dr. Gusev, the vaccine is finally delivered to Japan, saving millions of children's lives.

== Cast ==
- Leonid Filatov as Sergey Gusev
- Komaki Kurihara as Keiko
- Oleg Tabakov as Tutunov
- Elena Yakovleva as Tatiana
- Goh Watanabe as Ken
- Vladimir Ilin as Medyaev
- Andrey Kharitonov as Igor
- Akira Kume as minister
- Taketoshi Naitô as director
- Detlev Kügow as Horst
- Mikhail Gorevoy as Venka, the laboratory assistant
