= Spring on the Oder =

1967 Soviet war film

- Russian: Весна на Одере
- Directed by: Lev Saakov
- Written by: Nikolai Figurovsky; Emmanuil Kazakevich; Lev Saakov
- Starring: Anatoliy Kuznetsov; Anatoliy Grachyov; Lyudmila Chursina; Georgi Zhzhyonov; Yury Solomin
- Cinematography: Valeri Vladimirov
- Music by: Eduard Kolmanovskiy
- Release date: 1967
- Country: Soviet Union
- Language: Russian

Spring on the Oder (Russian: Весна на Одере) is a 1967 Soviet war film directed by Lev Saakov.

== Plot ==
The film takes place during the Great Patriotic War. The film tells about Major Lubentsov, who gets acquainted with military physician Tanya Koltsova, with whom he is selected from the environment, and then broke up. And suddenly, in April 1945, he meets her in Germany...

== Cast ==
- Anatoliy Kuznetsov as Lubentsov
- Anatoliy Grachyov as Chokhov (as Anatoli Grachyov)
- Lyudmila Chursina as Tanya
- Georgi Zhzhyonov as Ryzheusy
- Yury Solomin as Meshcherski
- Pyotr Shcherbakov as Sizokrylov
- Vladislav Strzhelchik as Krasikov
- Viktor Otisko as Slivyenko
