= Melodies of a White Night =

1976 film by Sergei Solovyov

- Directed by: Sergei Solovyov; Kiyoshi Nishimura
- Written by: Sergei Solovyov; Tasiyuki Tasikura
- Starring: Komaki Kurihara; Yury Solomin; Aleksandr Zbruyev
- Cinematography: Georgy Rerberg
- Music by: Isaac Schwartz
- Production companies: Mosfilm; Toho
- Release date: 1976
- Running time: 97 minutes
- Countries: Soviet Union; Japan
- Languages: Russian, Japanese

Melodies of a White Night (Russian: Мелодии белой ночи, romanized: Melodii beloy nochi; Japanese: 白夜の調べ) is a 1976 romantic drama directed by Sergei Solovyov.

== Plot ==
A Japanese pianist (Komaki Kurihara) travels to the Soviet Union to better understand the country's composers' production. She falls in love with Soviet composer Ilya (Yury Solomin), who has lost his parents in the Siege of Leningrad and also his wife during childbirth. The lovers enjoy Leningrad's white summer nights, and Ilya starts composing a piano concert inspired by Yuko. A couple of years later, they meet again in Japan in Kyoto, where Ilya is conducting his piano concert, and Yuko is the soloist. Ilya finds out that Yuko is a widow and starts to experience feelings of guilt.

== Cast ==
- Komaki Kurihara - Yuko, Japanese pianist
- Yury Solomin - Ilya, composer-conductor
- Aleksandr Zbruyev - Fedor, Ilya's brother, painter
- Sergey Polezhaev - musician, teacher
- Yelizaveta Solodova - foster mother of Ilya and Fedor, music teacher
- Andrey Leontovich - Alyosha, son of Ilya
- Seiji Miyaguchi
