= Vasily Alexeyevich Kar =

Vasily Alexeyevich Kar (Russian: Василий Алексеевич Кар; 1730 – 25 February 1806) was a Russian general chiefly noted for his defeat in the early stages of Pugachev's Rebellion. His defeat allowed the rebellion to grow into a major threat to the government of Catherine the Great until later army expeditions were able to suppress it. His family name is often transliterated in Western sources as Karr.

== Biography ==
He was the son of Aleksey Filippovich Kar (1680–1756), the head administrator of the Russian Salt Bureau from his marriage to the daughter of a court official and had an older sister named Ekaterina (1720–1804) and a younger brother, Filipp (1734–1809). The family traced its origins back to one Thomas Kerr who traveled on a mission with his brothers for James I of England to the court of Tsar Mikhail and was granted a patent of nobility in 1625.

Vasily Kar entered the military service in 1740, but his formal training began in January 1742 when he enrolled in the Corps of Pages. In 1748 he graduated as a poruchik and was assigned to an infantry regiment. In 1757 he volunteered to serve with the Austrian Army and the next year transferred to the French. In this capacity he saw action in the Seven Years' War.

By 1763 Kar was back in Russia and had been promoted to colonel. He was in Poland from 1766 to 1768, serving at the court of Prince Radziwiłł. On 22 September 1768 he was appointed a brigadier, and the next year was appointed commander of a special combined-arms legion of troops formed for the war against Turkey, christened at first the Foreign Legion but then retitled the Petersburg Legion.

On 1 January 1770 he was promoted to major-general. In 1773 he was made overseer of military recruiting in Petersburg. On 15 October of that same year he was sent to the lands of the Yaik to pacify the rebels there. Kar was defeated in battle and fled alongside his troops. For this failure he was ordered dishonorably discharged from the army on 1 December 1773, and was legally forbidden from living in the capital.

In 1775 he bought in auction an estate from Prince Boris Vasilyevich Golitsyn, sel'tso Goryainovo, located in today's Kaluga Oblast. Here he spent his days engaged in studying agricultural estate management until he became an expert in it.

Kar was judged very harshly by his contemporaries for his failures during Pugachev's rebellion. Decades later, Pushkin, in his own history of the revolt would describe the general's leadership during the crisis as, "Feeble, timid, and lacking diligence". For his part, while Kar played the part of an amiable and content country squire, he lived quietly and tried to avoid any mention of his once promising military career to his neighbors.

After Catherine's death, he was summoned back to St. Petersburg. Emperor Paul permitted him freedom to travel to and from his estate as he pleased. He died in 1806 at his home in Moscow, and was buried at the village of Voskresensky in northern Moscow Governorate, which he had acquired in the preceding years.

Kar was married to Princess Maria Sergeyevna Khovanskaya (1756-1833), and together they had four children: Ekaterina, Anna, Aleksey, and Sergei (died 1869). After the death of her husband she retired to a monastery in Kaluga. Both of his sons entered the military and fought against Napoleon's Invasion in 1812. Aleksey would lose a leg at Berezina while commanding an artillery battery, and Sergei would become a decorated cavalry officer in the following campaigns.
