= Kiyoshi Nishimura =

Japanese film director

- Born: September 7, 1932; Tokyo, Japan
- Died: November 17, 1993 (aged 61); Hayama, Kanagawa, Japan
- Occupation: Film director

Kiyoshi Nishimura (西村 潔, September 7, 1932 – November 17, 1993) was a Japanese film director and screenwriter. He was best known for working as an assistant director for filmmakers such as Akira Kurosawa and Ishiro Honda, and for directing numerous films under Toho.

== Education ==
Nishimura graduated from the Tachikawa High School in Tokyo. While studying, he worked part-time at a U.S. military base in Tachikawa, where he became interested in filmmaking. In 1956, he graduated from Hitotsubashi University, where he was a classmate of politician Shintaro Ishihara.

== Career ==
Nishimura joined the Toho entertainment corporation and worked as an assistant director for multiple filmmakers, including Akira Kurosawa, Mikio Naruse, Ishirō Honda, Yuzō Kawashima, Hirokawa Horimichi, Yasuki Chiba, Eizō Sugawa, Kengo Furusawa, and Hideo Onchi.

In 1969, he made his directorial debut with the action-thriller It's Too Early to Die (Shinu ni wa Mada Hayai), starring Toshio Kurosawa. Nishimura was known for incorporating jazz into his film soundtracks.

Due to the decline of the Japanese film industry, Nishimura left Tokyo to work independently and directed numerous television series. In 1987, Nishimura was arrested for using a video camera in a public bathhouse (sentō) to film women. This incident negatively impacted his career and public image, leading to a lack of job opportunities. Following the incident, he directed television series under the pseudonym Yūsai Itō (井藤雄才).

== Death ==
Nishimura was found dead on the Hayama coast in Kanagawa on November 17, 1993, having drowned. A police investigation concluded that his death was a suicide.

== Legacy ==
Kiyoshi Nishimura's work never became popular outside of Japan and several of his lesser known works fell into obscurity. However, some English critics revisited his films and reviewed them positively.

Benjamin Hunting of Hagerty discovered Hairpin Circus and was impressed with the cinematography of the film. He called the film "ahead of its time" and wrote:

"In an era where practical stunts were the only option, the entirety of the film’s street sequences are shot in-camera, with none of today’s adrenaline-simulating special effects layered on top. To enhance the sensation of speed, and further take viewers down the deep well of detachment and escapism soaking through the lives of each character, Nishimura favors long exposures that sear Tokyo’s streetlights and neons into the retina, while also attaching cameras to several of the vehicles seen on-screen to provide bumper, roof, and rear spoiler perspectives on the action at hand. Of particular note is some of the first use of now-common shaky-cam, adding to the furtive nature of the footage and making it seem almost as though the movie is being stolen straight from the city’s streets."

Hayley Scanlon, an independent film critic, revisted Nishimura's debut film Too Young To Die and positively reviewed it, writing that "Nishimura’s 1969 debut is a masterclass in high tension." She also reviewed The Creature Called Man and acclaimed the film, applauding its heavy political commentary.

== Filmography ==
As director:

| Year | English title | Japanese title | Romanized title | Notes |
|---|---|---|---|---|
| 1969 | Too Early to Die | 死ぬにはまだ早い | Shinu ni wa Mada Hayai | |
| 1970 | Daylight Attack | 白昼の襲撃 | Hakuchū no Shūgeki | |
| 1970 | The Creature Called Man | 豹は走った | Jagā wa Hashitta | |
| 1970 | Comedy: Man for Sale | 喜劇: 男売ります | Kigeki: Otoko Urimasu | |
| 1971 | Amazing Guys | 凄い奴ら | Sugoi Yatsura | |
| 1972 | Hairpin Circus | ヘアピン・サーカス | Heapin Sākasu | |
| 1972 | Rose Target | 薔薇の標的 | Bara no Hyōteki | |
| 1973 | Tomorrow Has Disappeared into the Sunset | 夕映えに明日は消えた | Yūbae ni Ashita wa Kieta | Unreleased |
| 1977 | Tree of Youth | 青年の樹 | Seinen no Ki | |
| 1978 | Melodies of a White Night | 白夜の調べ | Byakuya no Shirabe | Codirected with Sergei Solovyov |
| 1979 | Golden Partner | 黄金のパートナー | Ōgon no Pātonā | |
| 1984 | Eve in a Summer Dress | 夏服のイヴ | Natsufuku no Ibu | |
| 1991 | Madonna's Revenge | マドンナの復讐 | Madonna no Fukushū | Straight-to-video |
