= Komaki Kurihara =

Japanese actress (born 1945)

- 栗原 小巻
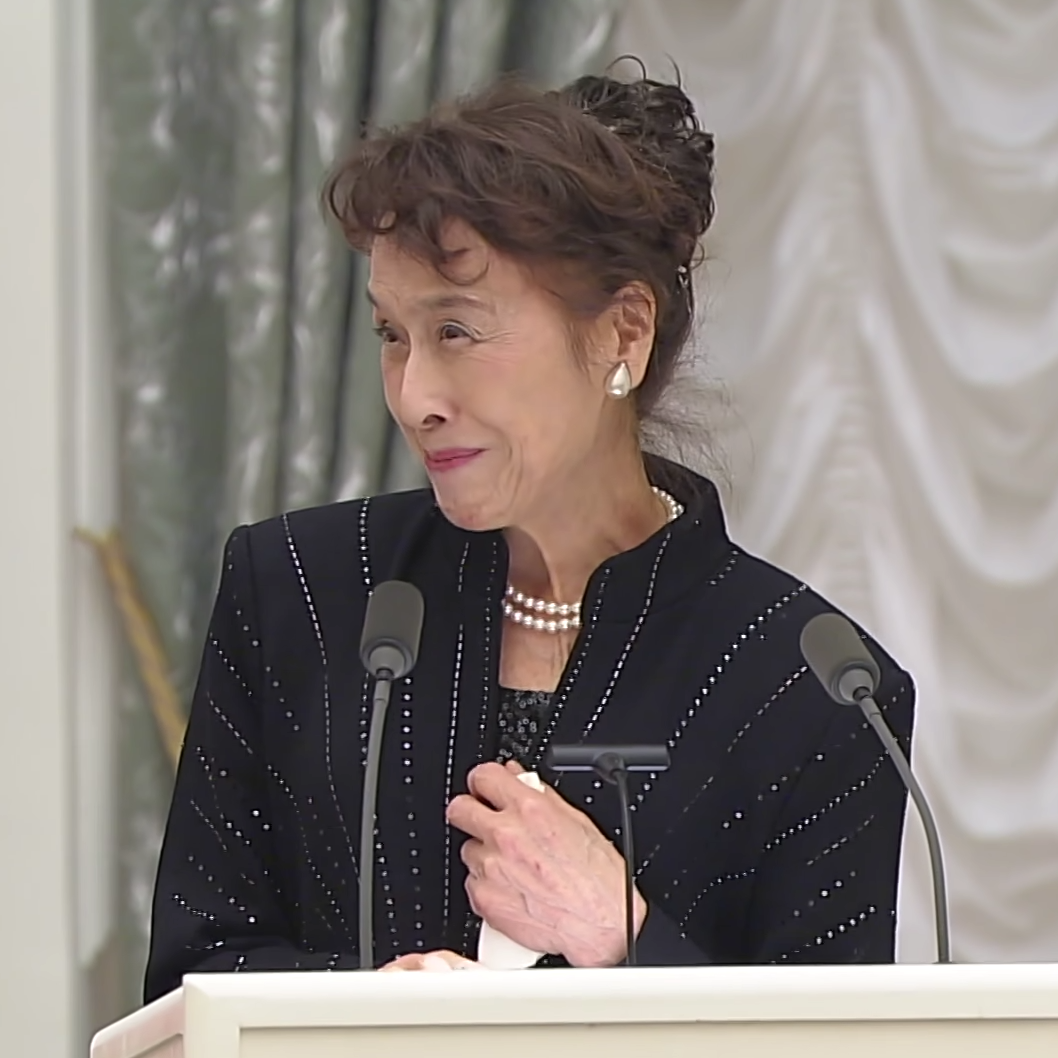
- Kurihara in 2025
- Born: 14 March 1945 (age 81); Tokyo, Japan
- Occupation: Actress
- Years active: 1967–present

Komaki Kurihara (栗原 小巻, Kurihara Komaki; born 14 March 1945) is a Japanese stage and film actress. She has appeared in 30 films since 1967. She starred in the 1974 film Sandakan No. 8, which was entered into the 25th Berlin International Film Festival. In 1975 she was a member of the jury at the 9th Moscow International Film Festival. In 1981 she was a member of the jury at the 12th Moscow International Film Festival.

In 2025, she was awarded Medal of Pushkin by Vladimir Putin.

== Selected filmography ==
=== Film ===
- Tora-san's Grand Scheme (1970)
- Men and War Part I (1970)
- The Wolves (1971)
- Inn of Evil (1971)
- Men and War Part II (1971)
- Shinobu Kawa (1972)
- Long Journey into Love (1973)
- Sandakan No. 8 (1974)
- Moscow, My Love (1974), USSR-Japan co-production.
- The Fossil (1975)
- Melodies of a White Night (1976), USSR-Japan co-production.
- Air Crew (Russian: Экипаж) (1979)
- Tora-san's Island Encounter (1985)
- A Step (1988), USSR-Japan co-production.
- Bell of Purity Temple (1992)
- Original (2009)
- Ware Yowakereba: Yajima Kajiko-den (2022)

=== Television ===
- Momi no Ki wa Nokotta (1970), Tayo
- Takechiyo to Haha (1970), Odai no Kata
- Shin Heike Monogatari (1972), Hōjō Masako
- Ōgon no Hibi (1978), Mio
- Sekigahara (1981), Hosokawa Gracia
- Ōoku (1983)
- Naotora: The Lady Warlord (2017), Odai no Kata
