= Steppe Dawns =

1953 film by Lev Saakov

- Directed by: Lev Saakov
- Written by: Boris Bednyj
- Starring: Iya Arepina
- Cinematography: Yuli Kun
- Music by: Anatoli Lepin
- Release date: 1953
- Running time: 61 minutes
- Country: Soviet Union
- Language: Russian

Steppe Dawns (Russian: Степные зори, romanized: Stepnye zori) is a 1953 Soviet drama film directed by Lev Saakov based on the eponymous novel by Boris Bedny.

The film received a permit dated March 25, 1953 for the all-Union hire except Moscow, Leningrad and the capitals of the republics of the Soviet Union, but then the Ministry of culture of the USSR imposed a complete ban on the production of the film "because of the extremely low ideological and artistic level." According to film critics Evgeny Margolit and Vyacheslav Shmyrov: "the film made by all the canons of the conflict-free theory and good fight with the best principle has lost all relevance in the new political environment".

== Cast ==
- Iya Arepina as Varya
- Lev Frichinsky as Styopa
- Nikolay Moskalenko as Alexey
- Yuriy Sarantsev as Pshenytsyn
- Georgi Gumilevsky as Pavel
- Leonid Kmit
- Boris Runge
- Rimma Shorokhova
- Valentina Telegina
- Viktor Uralskiy
- Pavel Volkov
