= Bell of Purity Temple =

- Film poster
- Directed by: Xie Jin
- Written by: Li Zhun; Li Che
- Produced by: Yu Benzheng
- Starring: Pu Cunxin; Komaki Kurihara
- Music by: Jin Fuzai
- Production company: Shanghai Film Studio
- Release date: 1992
- Running time: 116 minutes
- Country: People's Republic of China
- Language: Mandarin

Bell of Purity Temple (simplified Chinese: 清凉寺的钟声; traditional Chinese: 清涼寺的鐘聲; pinyin: qīng liáng sì de zhōng shēng) is a 1992 Chinese film about the life of a Japanese infant deserted in China after Sino-Japanese War. It is presented by Shanghai Film Studio and directed by Xie Jin, starring Pu Cunxin, Komaki Kurihara, Ding Yi, You Yong and Zhu Xu.
