= The Captain's Daughter =

1836 novel by Aleksandr Pushkin

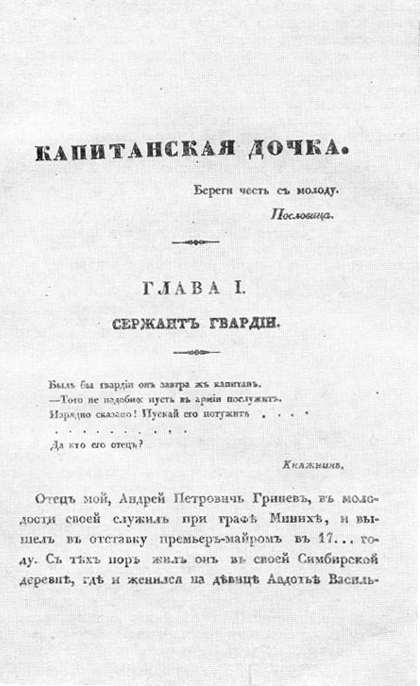
- First page of the original serialized version
- Author: Aleksandr Pushkin
- Original title: Капитанская дочка
- Language: Russian
- Genre: Historical novel
- Publication date: 1836
- Publication place: Russia
- Media type: Print (Hardback & Paperback)
- ISBN: 0-394-70714-1
- OCLC: 1669532
- Text: The Captain's Daughter at Wikisource

The Captain's Daughter (Russian: «Капитанская дочка», romanized: Kapitanskaja dočka) is a historical novel by the Russian writer Alexander Pushkin. It was first published in 1836 in the fourth issue of the literary journal Sovremennik and is his only completed novel. The novel is a romanticized account of Pugachev's Rebellion in 1773–1774. The title "The Captain's Daughter" has also been used to refer to a collection of stories, one of which was the actual novel.

== Plot ==
Pyotr Andreyich Grinyov (the narrative is conducted on his behalf) is the only surviving child of a retired Imperial Army officer. When Pyotr turns 17, his father sends him into military service in Orenburg, accompanied by his servant, Savelitch. While en route, Pyotr gets lost in a blizzard, but is rescued by a mysterious man. As a token of his gratitude, Pyotr gives the guide his hareskin coat, despite Savelitch's attempts to dissuade him from doing so.

Arriving in Orenburg, Pyotr reports to his commanding officer and is assigned to serve at Fort Belogorsky under Captain Ivan Mironov. The "fort" is little more than a fence around a village, and the captain's wife Vasilisa is really in charge. Pyotr befriends his fellow officer Shvabrin, who has been banished here after a duel resulted in the death of his opponent. When Pyotr dines with the Mironov family, he meets their daughter Masha and falls in love with her. This causes a rift between Pyotr and Shvabrin, who has been turned down by Masha. When Shvabrin insults Masha's honor, Pyotr and Shvabrin duel and Pyotr is injured. Pyotr asks his father's consent to marry Masha, but is refused.

Not much later, the fortress is besieged by the insurgent Yemelyan Pugachev, who claims to be the Emperor Peter III. The Cossacks stationed at the fortress defect to the forces of Pugachev, and he takes the fortress easily. He demands that Captain Mironov swear an oath of allegiance to him, and when refused, hangs the Captain and kills his wife. When it is Pyotr's turn, Shvabrin suddenly appears to have defected as well, and upon his advice Pugachev orders Pyotr to be hanged. However, his life is suddenly spared as Pugachev turns out to be the guide who rescued Pyotr from the blizzard, and he recognizes Pyotr whom he remembers with affection.

The next evening, Pyotr and Pugachev talk in private. Pyotr impresses Pugachev with the sincerity of his insistence that he cannot serve him. Pugachev decides to let Pyotr go to Orenburg. He is to relay a message to the Governor that Pugachev will be marching on his city. The fort is to be left under the command of Shvabrin, who takes advantage of the situation to try to compel Masha to marry him. Pyotr rushes off to prevent this marriage, but is captured by Pugachev's troops. After explaining the situation to Pugachev, they both ride off to the fortress.

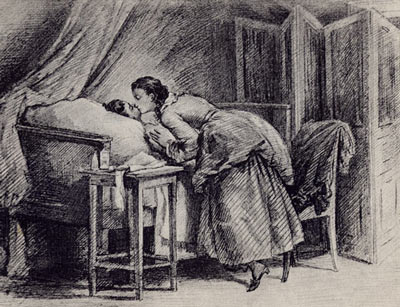
Masha and Pyotr; illustration by Pavel Sokolov

After Masha is freed, she and Pyotr take off to his father's estate, but they are intercepted by Imperial troops. Pyotr decides to stay with the army and sends Masha to his father. The war with Pugachev goes on and Pyotr rejoins the army. At the moment of Pugachev's defeat, Pyotr is arrested for having friendly relations with Pugachev. During his interrogation, Shvabrin testifies that Pyotr is a traitor. Not willing to drag Masha into court, Pyotr is unable to repudiate this accusation and receives the death penalty. Although Empress Catherine the Great commutes his death sentence, Pyotr remains a prisoner.

Masha understands why Pyotr wasn't able to defend himself and decides to go to St. Petersburg, to present a petition to the empress. In Tsarskoye Selo, she meets a lady of the court and details her plan to see the Empress on Pyotr's behalf. The lady refuses at first, saying that Pyotr is a traitor, but Masha is able to explain all the circumstances. Soon, Masha receives an invitation to see the Empress, and is shocked to recognize her as the lady she had talked to earlier. The Empress has become convinced of Pyotr's innocence and has ordered his release. Pyotr witnesses the beheading of Pugachev. He and Masha are married.

== List of characters ==
- Pötr Andrejič Grinöv – Young officer of the Russian Army.
- Andrej Petrovič Grinöv – Pötr's father.
- Avdotja Vasiĺěvna – Andrej's wife, Pötr's mother.
- Arhip Saveĺjič – Pötr's loyal servant.
- Marja Ivanovna (Masha) – Pötr's great love and his future wife.
- Ivan Kuźmič Mironov – Marya's father and the fort's captain.
- Vasilisa Ěgorovna – Ivan's wife, Marya's mother.
- Aleksej Ivanovič Švabrin – Officer. Pötr's enemy.
- Yemelyan Pugatchev – Ataman of the Yaik Cossacks leading a great popular insurrection against Catherine the Great.
- Gerasim – clergyman.
- Akulina Pamfilovna – Gerasim's wife.
- Catherine the Great – Empress of Russia from 1762 to 1796.
- Anna Vlassyevna – Marya's friend.
- Andrej Karlovič – General serving in Orenburg.
- Ivan Ivanovič Zurin – Cavalry dragoon officer.
- Maksimyč – Cossack sargeant.
- Ivan Ignaťjič – Old man and lieutenant at Mironov's.
- Monsieur Beaupré – Pötr's preceptor.
- Palaška, Akuĺka – Maids.
- Yulay – A baptized Kalmyk who worked for Mironov's fort.

== Adaptations ==
Composer César Cui adapted the novel to a libretto for his opera of the same name. Several films have been made as well:

- 1934 – Volga in Flames directed by Viktor Tourjansky
- 1947 – La figlia del capitano by director Mario Camerini with Cesare Danova as Pyotr and Irasema Dilián as Masha.
- 1958 – Tempest by director Alberto Lattuada with Geoffrey Horne as Pyotr and Silvana Mangano as Masha.
- 1958 – Kapitanskaya Dochka by director Vladimir Kaplunovsky with Oleg Strizhenov as Pyotr and Iya Arepina as Masha.
- 1998 – Dark Brown Eyes, a musical opera, by director Sha Tamae for the Takarazuka Revue.
- 2000 – Russkiy Bunt by director Aleksandr Proshkin with Mateusz Damiecki as Pyotr and Karolina Gruszka as Masha.(see https://www.imdb.com/title/tt0167380/)
- 2005 – The Captain's Daughter, a 28-minute stop motion-animated film. Placed 4th in the professional rating at the 2006 Open Russian Festival of Animated Film. Won a Golden Eagle Award in the category "Best Animated Film" in 2007.
