= Iya Arepina =

Russian actress (1930–2003)

Iya Alexeyevna Arepina (Russian: И́я Алексе́евна Аре́пина; July 2, 1930 in Ardatov – July 24, 2003 in Moscow) was a Soviet/Russian actress.

She was named Best Actress at the 1955 Cannes Film Festival for her performance in Bolshaya Semya, directed by Iosif Kheifits.

== Selected filmography ==
- Steppe Dawns (1953) as Varya
- A Big Family (1954) as Tonya Zhurbina
- Land and People (1955) as student
- Ilya Muromets (1956) as Alyonushka
- The Wrestler and the Clown (1957) as Maria Nikolayevna aka Mimi
- Most Expensive (1957) as Polina, sister of Roman
- The Captain's Daughter (1958) as Masha Mironova
- Red Leaves (1958) as Stasya Yanovskaya
- On the Roads of War (1958) as Vera
- Under the Sound of Wheels (1958) as Nastya
- Journey Beyond Three Seas (1958) as Dunayaha
- Special Approach (1959) as Olya, kindergarten manageress
- Gloomy Vangur (1959) as Natasha, student
- After the Ball (1961) as Varenka Butyrlina
- When Bridges are Made (1962) as Inga
- War and Peace (1967) as girl in the Akhrosimova house, who gave Natasha a letter
- The Incident, which no one Noticed (1967)
- The Red Snowball Tree (1974) as Egor Prokudin's sister
