= Eve in a Summer Dress =

1984 film directed by Kiyoshi Nishimura

Eve in a Summer Dress (夏服のイヴ) is a Japanese romance film directed by Kyoshi Nishimura and released in Japan on July 7, 1984, distributed by Toho. It is the third film to star Seiko Matsuda (following The Tomb of the Wild Chrysanthemums and The Legend of the Plumeria).

== Plot ==
Makiko, a country girl who wishes to become a kindergarten teacher, goes to Tokyo and falls in love with Hidekazu, an aspiring writer.

== Cast ==
- Makiko Fujieda: Seiko Matsuda
- Hidekazu Nishimaru: Kenji Haga
- Kayo Sakurai: Akiko Kazami
- Akira Munekata: Masaki Yamakoshi
- Sumire Munakata: Mitsuko Kondo
- Yuzu Munakata: Kae Kondo
- Misao Iida: Iwaki Tokuei
- Akiko Ejiri: Junko Asahina
- Ryoichi Fujieda: Akira Nagoya
- Shinobu Fujieda: Sakura Kamo
- Hiroshi Fujieda: Kei Sakano
- Kindergarten Principal: Sachio Sakai
- Jimmy Lawrence: David Teleford
- Jane Lawrence: Janice Gray
- Joe Lawrence: Greg Wright
- David Lawrence: Marcellus Vanfast
- Tomiko Nishimaru: Yoko Nogiri
- Seiichiro Munakata: Masami Kondo

== Theme song ==
- Seiko Matsuda "Summer Eve" (Publisher: CBS Sony)
