= Yury Solomin =

Russian actor (1935–2024)

- Юрий Соломин
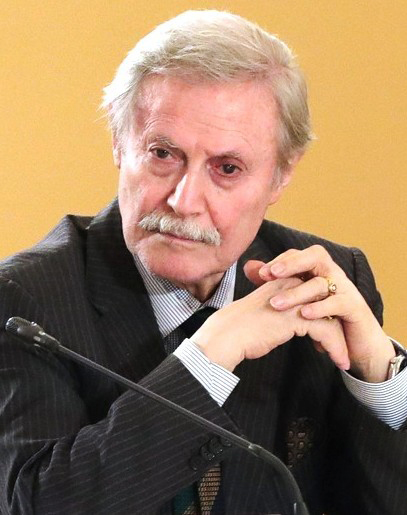
- Solomin in 2019
- Born: 18 June 1935; Chita, East Siberian Krai, Russian SFSR, USSR
- Died: 11 January 2024 (aged 88); Moscow, Russia
- Years active: 1957–2024
- Spouse: Olga Nikolaevna Solomina (1931–2019)
- Children: One daughter

Yury Mefodyevich Solomin (Russian: Ю́рий Мефо́диевич Соло́мин; 18 June 1935 – 11 January 2024) was a Soviet and Russian actor and director who was an art director of the Maly Theatre in Moscow from 1988. He previously served as Minister of Culture of the RSFSR from 1990 to 1991.

== Biography ==
Solomin studied at the Malyi Theatre School and joined its troupe in 1957. He was acclaimed as Khlestakov in Igor Ilyinsky's production of The Government Inspector (1966), Tsar Feodor in Tsar Feodor Ioannovich (1976), Slavin in TASS Is Authorized to Declare... TV series (1984), Nicholas II in Az Vosdam... (1990), and Famusov in his own production of Woe from Wit (2000). Solomin was cast as a Russian imperial officer in many Soviet movies, including Akira Kurosawa's Dersu Uzala (1975), which won him a Japanese decoration for the outstanding contribution to the world culture (1993).

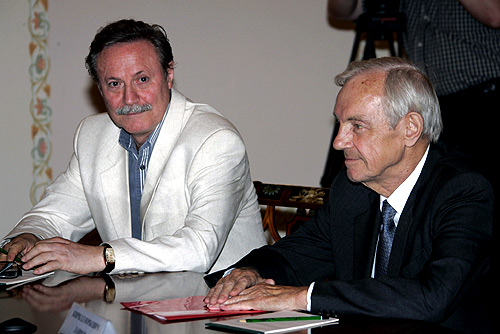
Solomin and Kirill Lavrov (2005)

Solomin served as the Russian Minister of Culture from 1990 to 1992. On 11 March 2014, he signed the appeal of culture of the Russian Federation in support of the policies of Russian President Vladimir Putin in Ukraine and Crimea. In December 2015, he supported the policy of Putin with respect to Ukraine and the annexation of the Crimea. In February 2022, he supported the Russian invasion of Ukraine.

His younger brother Vitaly Solomin (1941–2002) was also a noted actor.

Yury Solomin died of kidney failure on 11 January 2024, at the age of 88.

== Honors and awards ==
- People's Artist of Kyrgyzstan (1996)
- Honored Worker of Arts of the Republic of Mari El
- Order of Friendship of Peoples (1985)

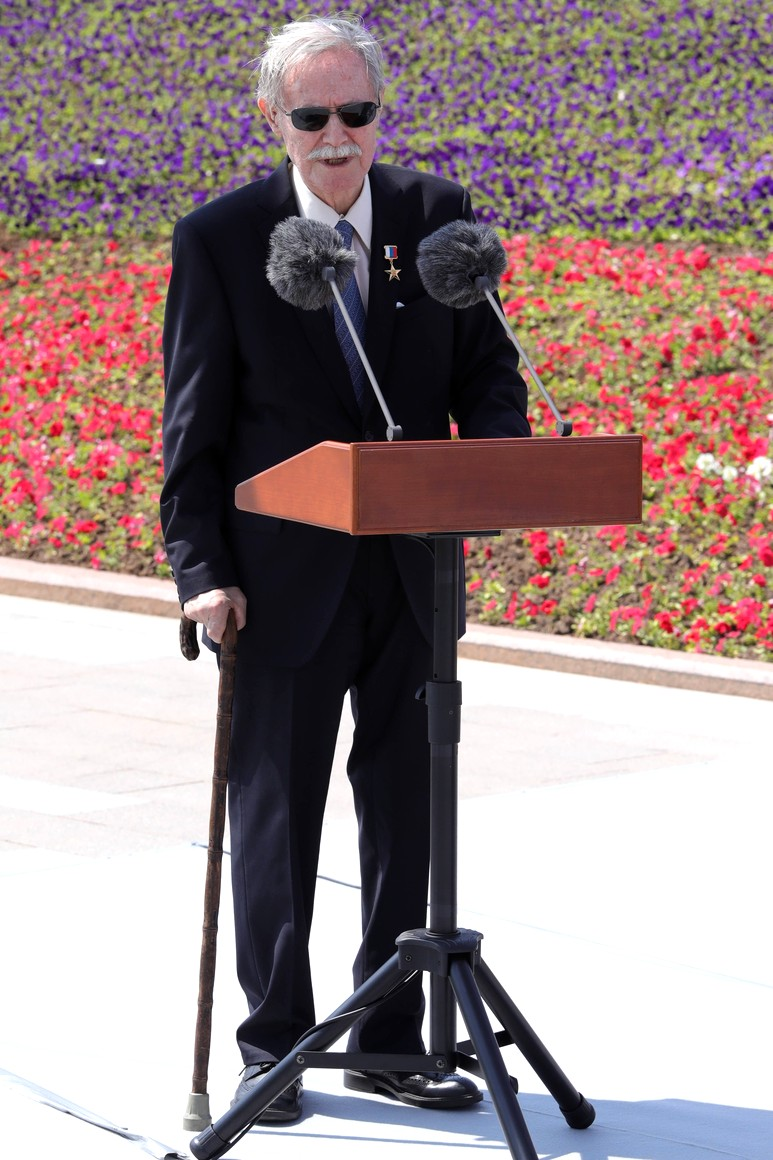
12 June 2020

- Hero of Labour of the Russian Federation (2020)
- People's Artist of the USSR (1988)
- People's Artist of the RSFSR (1974)
- Honored Artist of the RSFSR (1971)
- Vasilyev Brothers State Prize of the RSFSR (1971) - for his role of Captain Koltsov in the mini-series The Adjutant of His Excellency (1969)
- Award of the KGB (1984) - for his role as Slavin in the mini-series TASS Is Authorized to Declare... (1984)
- Award for student work in Bratislava (Slovakia) and Kobe (Japan)
- Order "For Merit to the Fatherland";

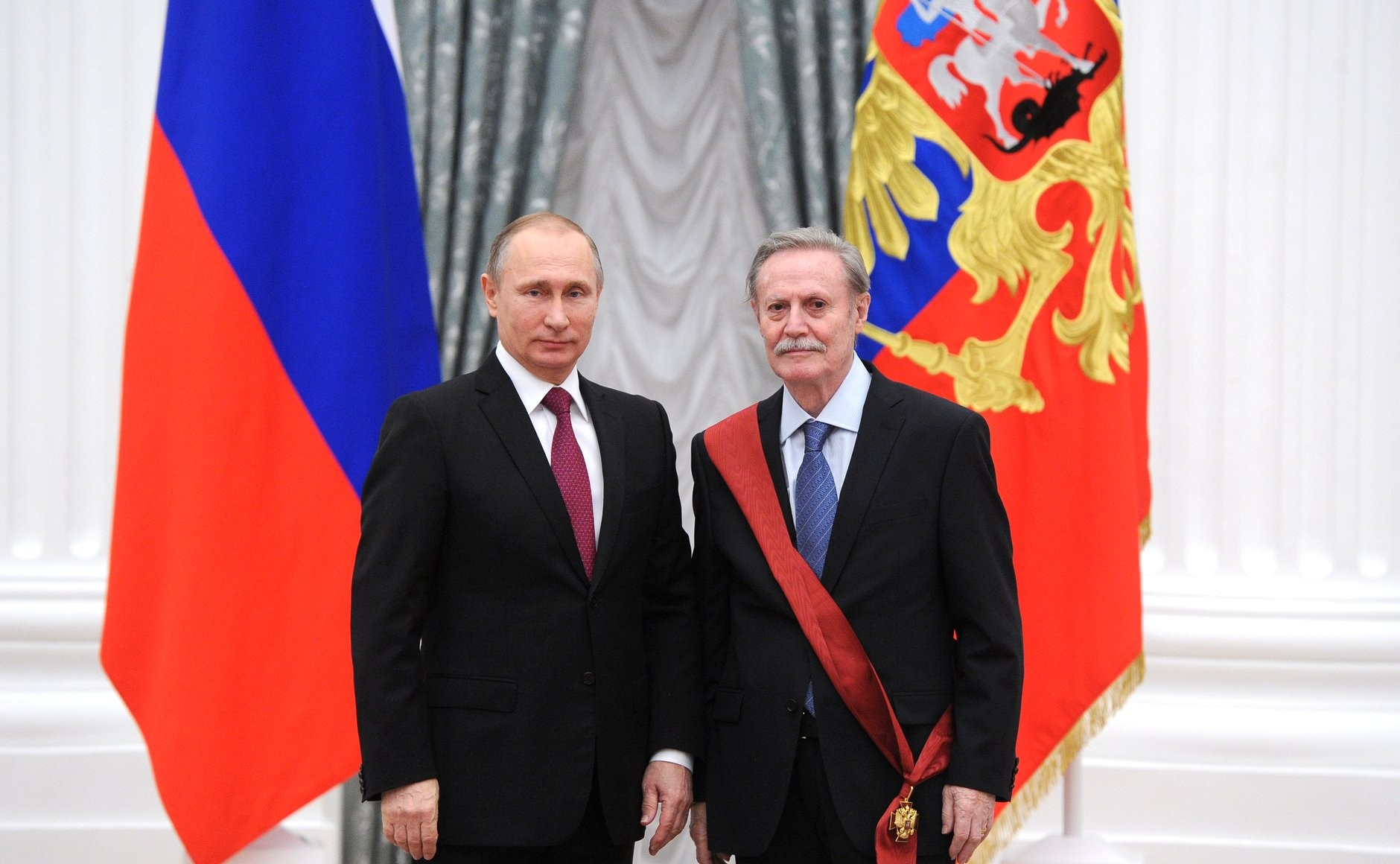
With Vladimir Putin, 10 December 2015

  - 1st class (29 June 2015)

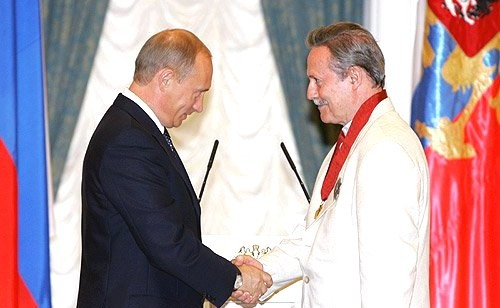
25 July 2005

  - 2nd class (18 June 2005)
  - 3rd class (25 October 1999)
  - 4th class (29 May 1995)
- Order of the Academy of Arts of Japan "for contribution to world culture" (No. 199)
- "Golden Aries" award for his outstanding contribution to the development of national cinema (1996)
- State Prize of the Russian Federation (2001)
- International Stanislavsky Theater Award - for his role in the play Famusov Maly, "Woe from Wit" (2001)
- Medal "In Memory of Kazan 1000th anniversary" (2009)
- Award of Kuzbass (2007)
- Commemorative Medal "150th anniversary of Anton Chekhov" (2011)
- 10054 Solomin asteroid number 10054, named in his honor
- Award "Man of the Year 2008" (Russian Biographical Institute)
- Honorary Member of the Russian Academy of Arts
- Corresponding Member of Russian Academy of Education (1992)
- Award of the Federal Security Service in the "acting job" for the creation of highly image security personnel in the domestic film industry (2010)

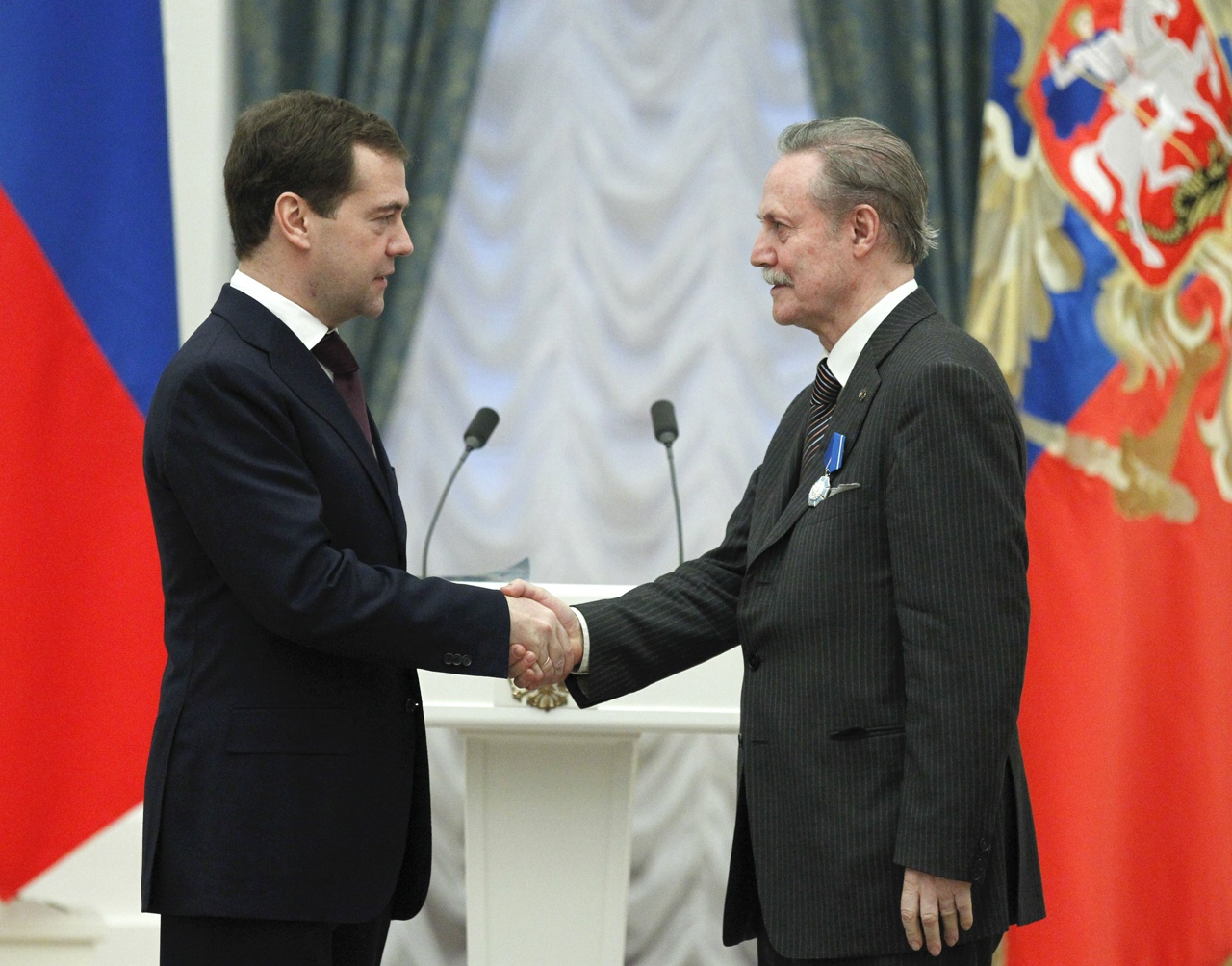
With Dmitry Medvedev on presentation of the Order of Honour, 30 December 2010

- Order of Honour (2010)
- Order of Holy Prince Daniel of Moscow (Russian Orthodox Church)
- Medal Glory of Chita (No. 1)
- Order of the Rising Sun, 3rd Class, Gold Rays with Neck Ribbon (Japan, 2011)

== Filmography ==
- Sleepless Night (1960) as Pavel Kaurov
- A Mother's Heart (1965) as Dmitry Ilyich Ulyanov
- A Mother's Devotion (1966) as Dmitry Ilyich Ulyanov
- Strong with Spirit (1967) as Major Martin von Güttel
- Spring on the Oder (1967) as Captain Aleksandr Meshchersky
- The Red Tent (1969) as Troiani
- The Adjutant of His Excellency (1969) as Captain Pavel Andreyevich Koltsov
- Dauria (1971) as Semyon Nagorny, Bolshevik blacksmith
- The Fourth (1972) as Charles Howard
- Sokolovo (1974) as General Shafarenko
- Dersu Uzala (1975) as Vladimir Arsenyev
- Melodies of a White Night (1976) as Ilya, composer-conductor
- School Waltz (1978) as Pavel Knushevitsky, Zosya's father
- An Ordinary Miracle (1978) as Emil the innkeeper
- Die Fledermaus (1979) as Heinrich Eisenstein
- Moon Rainbow (1983) as Nikolsky
- The Shore of His Life (1984) as Nicholas Miklouho-Maclay
- TASS Is Authorized to Declare... (1984) as Vitaly Vsevolodovich Slavin, KGB colonel
- Sofia Kovalevskaya (1985) as Grand Duke
- Singing Russia (1986) as Mitrofan Pyatnitsky
- Anna Karamazoff (1991) as Colonel general
- Dreams of Russia (1992) as Count Alexander Bezborodko
- Moscow Saga (2004) as Boris Nikitich Gradov, doctor
- Man of East (2008) as Vladimir Timofeyevich Rokotov, lieutenant general
