= Vladimir Tsvetov =

International Observer & TV Commentator

- Tsvetov in 1991
- Born: 11 July 1933; Moscow
- Died: 5 October 1993 (aged 60); Tokio
- Education: Institute of Asian and African Countries
- Occupations: tennis player, actor, sports commentator

Vladimir Yakovlevich Tsvetov (Russian: Влади́мир Я́ковлевич Цве́тов; 11 July 1933, Moscow — 5 October 1993, Tokyo) was an International observer, TV commentator, orientalist, japanist. Son of the writer, poet and journalist Yakov Tsvetov (Tseitlin) (1909-1977).

In 1957, Vladimir Tsvetov graduated from the Institute of Oriental Languages at Moscow State University. Lomonosov (specialty - historian) and began to work in the media. He began his career as an employee of the Foreign Service, telling the people of Japan about life in the USSR.

Since January 1976 to October 1983 he worked in Japan as a correspondent for Soviet television.

Active participant of perestroika, columnist of the newspaper Moskovskiye Novosti. Vladimir Yakovlevich Tsvetov, being in Japan, suddenly died in one of the Tokyo hospitals on October 5, 1993. The only journalist whose farewell ceremony was held at the House of the Russian Press.

He was buried at the Vvedenskoye Cemetery.

He was posthumously awarded the Medal Defender of a Free Russia.
