= Lev Saakov =

Armenian film director (1909–1989)

- Born: November 30, 1909; Alexandropol, Russian Empire
- Died: March 10, 1988 (aged 78); Moscow, USSR
- Occupations: Director, Screenwriter, Cinematographer
- Years active: 1945-1985 (film)

Lev Saakov (November 30, 1909 – March 10, 1988) was an Armenian screenwriter and film director of the Soviet era.

== Selected filmography ==
- Reportazh s linii ognya (1985)
- Krutoe pole (1979)
- More v ogne (1972)
- Vesna na Odere (1968)
- Tri vremeni goda (1966)
- Poslednie zalpy (1961)
- Na dorogakh voyny (1959)
- Steppe Dawns (1953)
- Shura Poloskov i Ashur Mardanov (1934)

== Bibliography ==
- Vlada Petrić. Constructivism in Film - A Cinematic Analysis: The Man with the Movie Camera. Cambridge University Press, 2012.
