= Pugachev's Rebellion =

Peasant revolt against Empress Catherine II of Russia

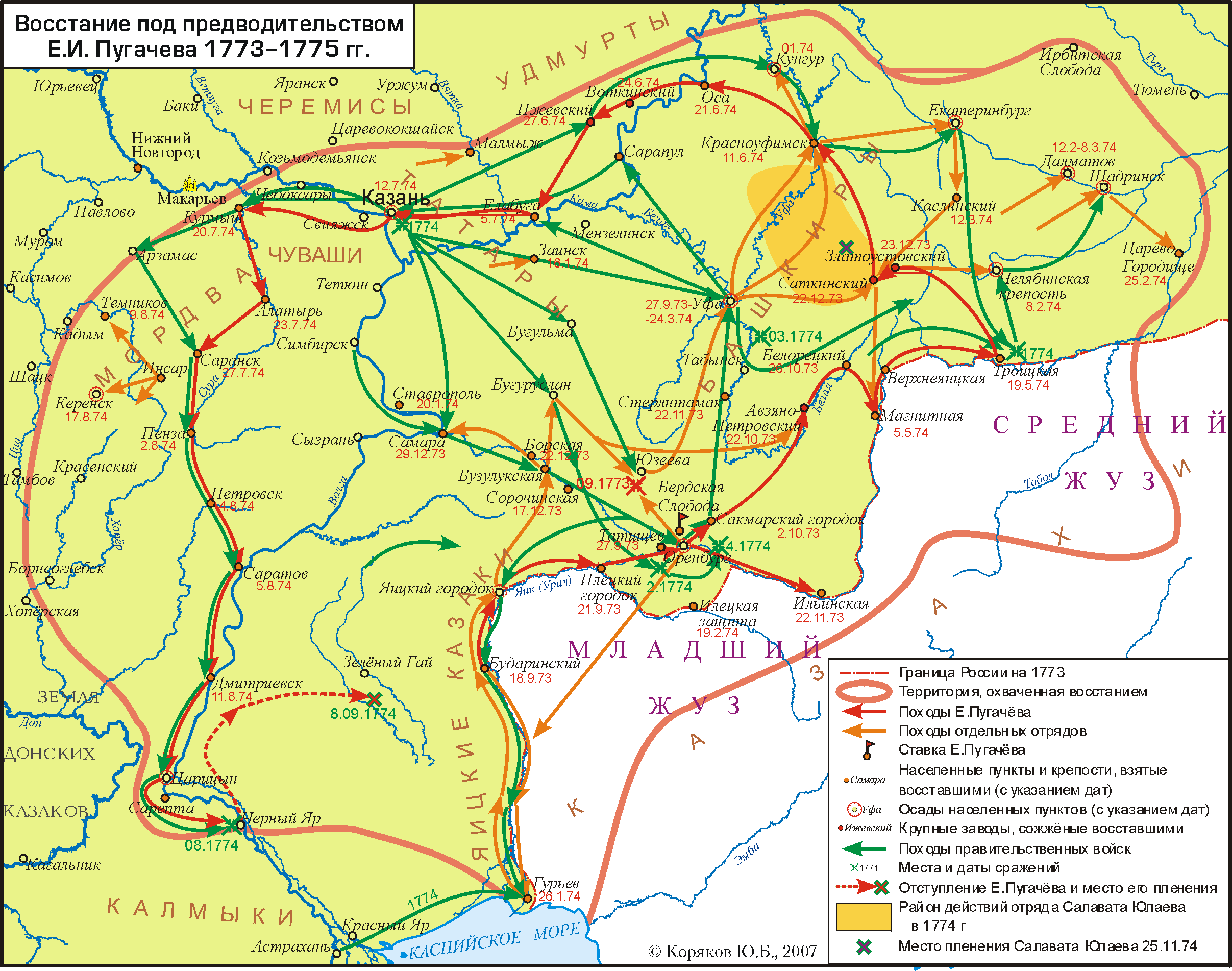
Date	1773–1775
Location	Russian Empire: Volga region, Ural region
Result	Russian government victory: Catherine expands serfdom

Belligerents
Russian Empire • Imperial Russian Army	Followers of Yemelyan Pugachev: • Ural Cossacks • Russian serfs • Old Believers • Bashkirs • Tatars • Chuvash • Mari • Mordvins (Erzyas and Mokshas) • Udmurts • Kazakhs • Kalmyks

Commanders and leaders
Catherine the Great; Grigory Potemkin; Petr Panin; Alexander Suvorov; Johann von Michelsohnen; Vasily Alexeyevich Kar	Yemelyan Pugachev (executed); Salawat Yulayev

Strength
30,000+	1773: 15,000 men; 80 artillery pieces; 1774: 25,000 men

Casualties and losses
3,500 killed	20,000 killed; 16,000 captured

Pugachev's Rebellion (Russian: Восстание Пугачёва, romanized: Vosstaniye Pugachyova; also called the Peasants' War 1773–1775 or Cossack Rebellion) of 1773–1775 was the principal revolt in a series of popular rebellions that took place in the Russian Empire after Catherine II, known today as Catherine the Great, seized power in 1762. It began as an organized insurrection of Yaik Cossacks headed by Yemelyan Pugachev, a disaffected ex-lieutenant of the Imperial Russian Army, against a background of profound peasant unrest and war with the Ottoman Empire. After initial success, Pugachev assumed leadership of an alternative government, claiming to be Catherine's late husband Tsar Peter III and proclaiming an end to serfdom. This organized leadership presented a challenge to the imperial administration of Catherine II.

The rebellion managed to consolidate support from various groups including the peasants, the Cossacks, and Old Believers. At one point, its administration claimed control over most of the territory between the Volga River and the Ural Mountains. One of the most significant events of the insurrection was the Battle of Kazan in July 1774.

Government forces failed to respond effectively to the insurrection at first, partly due to logistical difficulties and a failure to appreciate its scale. However, the revolt was crushed towards the end of 1774 by General Michelsohn at Tsaritsyn. Pugachev was captured soon after and executed in Moscow in January 1775. Further reprisals against rebel areas were carried out by General Peter Panin.

The events have generated many stories in legend and literature, most notably Alexander Pushkin's historical novel The Captain's Daughter (1836). It was the largest peasant revolt in the history of the Russian Empire.

== Background and aims ==
As the Russian monarchy contributed to the degradation of the serfs, peasant anger ran high. Peter the Great ceded entire villages to favored nobles, while Catherine the Great confirmed the authority of the nobles over the serfs in return for the nobles' political cooperation. The unrest intensified as the 18th century wore on, with more than fifty peasant revolts occurring between 1762 and 1769. These culminated in Pugachev's Rebellion, when, between 1773 and 1775, Yemelyan Pugachev rallied the peasants and Cossacks and promised the serfs land of their own and freedom from their lords.

There were various pressures on Russian serfs during the 18th century, which induced them to follow Pugachev. The peasantry in Russia were no longer bound to the land, but tied to their owner. The connecting links that had existed between the peasant community and the tsar, which had been diminishing, was broken by the interposition of the serf owners; these private lords or agents of the Church or state who owned the land blocked serfs' access to the political authority. Many nobles returned to their estates after 1762 and imposed harsher rules on their peasants. The relationship between peasant and ruler was cut off most dramatically in the decree of 1767, which completely prohibited direct petitions to the empress from the peasantry. The peasants were also subject to an increase in indirect taxes due to the increase in the state's requirements. In addition, a strong inflationary trend resulted in higher prices on all goods. The peasants felt abandoned by the "modern" state. They were living in desperate circumstances and had no way to change their situation, having lost all possibilities for political redress.

There were natural disasters in Russia during the 18th century, which also added strain on the peasants. Frequent recurrence of crop failures, plagues and epidemics created economic and social instability. The most dramatic was the 1771 epidemic in Moscow, which brought to the surface all the unconscious and unfocused fears and panics of the populace.

Each ruler altered the position of the Church, which created more pressure. Peter the Great gave the Church new obligations, while its administration assimilated to a department of the secular state. The Church's resources, or the means of collection, could not meet the new obligations and as a consequence, they heavily exploited and poorly administered their serfs. The unrest spurred constant revolt among Church serfs.

== Leadership and strategy ==
Pugachev's image according to folk memory and contemporary legends was one of a pretender-liberator. As Peter III, he was seen as Christ-like and saintly because he had meekly accepted his dethronement by his evil wife Catherine II and her courtiers. He had not resisted his overthrow, but had left to wander the world. He had come to help the revolt, but he did not initiate it; according to popular myth, the Cossacks and the people did that.

The popular mythology of Peter III linked Pugachev with the Emancipation Manifesto of 1762 and the serf's expectations of further liberalizations had he continued as ruler. Pugachev offered freedom from the poll tax and the recruit-levy, which made him appear to follow in the same vein as the emperor he was impersonating.

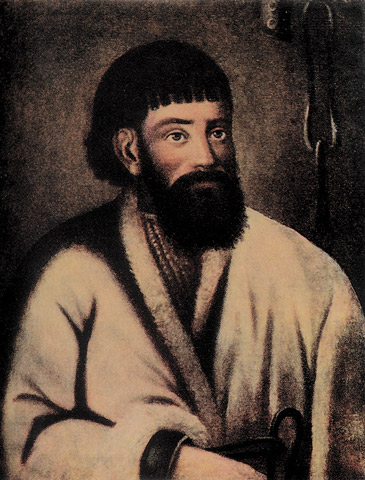
Yemelyan Pugachev

Pugachev attempted to reproduce the St. Petersburg bureaucracy. He established his own College of War with quite extensive powers and functions. He did not promise complete freedom from taxation and recruitment for the peasants; he granted only temporary relief. His perception of the state was one where soldiers took the role of Cossacks, meaning they were free, permanent, military servicemen. Pugachev placed all other military personnel into this category as well, even the nobles and officers who joined his ranks. All peasants were seen as servants of the state, they were to become state peasants and serve as Cossacks in the militia. Pugachev envisioned the nobles returning to their previous status as the czar's servicemen on salary instead of estate and serf owners. He emphasized the peasants' freedom from the nobility. Pugachev still expected the peasants to continue their labor, but he granted them the freedom to work and own the land. They would also enjoy religious freedoms and Pugachev promised to restore the bond between the ruler and the people, eradicating the role of the noble as the intermediary.

Under the guise of Peter III, Pugachev built up his own bureaucracy and army, which copied that of Catherine. Some of his top commanders took on the pseudonyms of dukes and courtiers. Zarubin Chaika, Pugachev's top commander, for example, took the guise of Zakhar Chernyshev. The army Pugachev established, at least at the very top levels of command, also mimicked Catherine's. The organizational structure Pugachev set up for his top command was extraordinary, considering Pugachev defected as an ensign from Catherine's army. He built up his own War College and a fairly sophisticated intelligence network of messengers and spies. Even though Pugachev was illiterate, he recruited the help of local priests, mullahs, and starshins to write and disseminate his "royal decrees" or ukases in Russian and Tatar languages. These ukazy were copied, sent to villages and read to the masses by the priests and mullahs. In these documents, he begged the masses to serve him faithfully. He promised to grant to those who followed his service land, salt, grain, and lowered taxes, and threatened punishment and death to those who didn't. For example, an excerpt from a ukase written in late 1773:

From me, such reward and investiture will be with money and bread compensation and with promotions: and you, as well as your next of kin will have a place in my government and will be designated to serve a glorious duty on my behalf. If there are those who forget their obligations to their natural ruler Peter III, and dare not carry out the command that my devoted troops are to receive weapons in their hands, then they will see for themselves my righteous anger, and will then be punished harshly.

== Recruitment and support ==
From the very beginning of the insurgency, Pugachev's generals carried out mass recruitment campaigns in Tatar and Bashkir settlements, with the instructions of recruiting one member from every or every other household and as many weapons as they could secure. He recruited not only Cossacks, but Russian peasants and factory workers, Tatars, Bashkirs, and Chuvash. Famous Bashkir hero Salawat Yulayev joined him. Pugachev's primary target for his campaign was not the people themselves, but their leaders. He recruited priests and mullahs to disseminate his decrees and read them to the masses as a way of lending them credence.

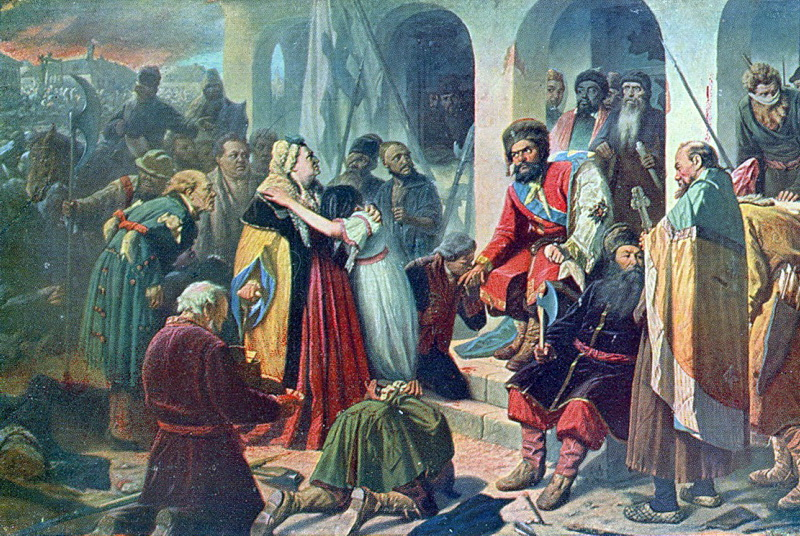
Vasily Perov, Pugachev's Court (1879 variant; Russian Museum, Saint-Petersburg)

Priests in particular were instrumental figures in carrying out Pugachev's propaganda campaigns. Pugachev was known to stage "heroic welcomes" whenever he entered a Russian village, in which he would be greeted by the masses as their sovereign. A few days before his arrival to a given city or village, messengers would be sent out to inform the priests and deacons in that town of his impending arrival. These messengers would request that the priests bring out salt and water and ring the church bells to signify his coming. The priests would also be instructed to read Pugachev's manifestos during mass and sing prayers to the health of the Great Emperor Peter III. Most priests, although not all, complied with Pugachev's requests. One secret report of Catherine's College of War, for example, tells of one such priest, Zubarev, who recruited for Pugachev in Church under such orders. "[Zubarev], believing in the slander-ridden decree of the villainous-imposter, brought by the villainous Ataman Loshkarev, read it publicly before the people in church. And when that ataman brought his band, consisting of 100 men, to their Baikalov village, then that Zubarev met them with a cross and with icons and chanted prayers in the Church; and then at the time of service, as well as after, evoked the name of the Emperor Peter III for suffrage." (Pugachevshchina Vol. 2, Document 86. Author's translation)

Pugachev's army was composed of a diverse mixture of disaffected peoples in southern Russian society, most notably Cossacks, Bashkirs, homesteaders, religious dissidents (such as Old Believers) and industrial serfs. Pugachev was very much in touch with the local population's needs and attitudes; he was a Don Cossack and encountered the same obstacles as his followers. It is noticeable that Pugachev's forces always took routes that reflected the very regional and local concerns of the people making up his armies. For example, after the very first attack on Yaitsk, he turned not towards the interior, but instead turned east towards Orenburg which for most Cossacks was the most direct symbol of Russian oppression.

The heterogeneous population in Russia created special problems for the government, and it provided opportunities for those opposing the state and seeking support among the discontented, as yet unassimilated natives. Each group of people had problems with the state, which Pugachev focused on in order to gain their support.

Non-Russians, such as the Bashkirs, followed Pugachev because they were promised their traditional ways of life, freedom of their lands, water and woods, their faith and laws, food, clothing, salaries, weapons and freedom from enserfment. Cossacks were similarly promised their old ways of life, the rights to the river Iaik (now the Ural River) from source to sea, tax-free pasturage, free salt, twelve chetvi of corn and 12 roubles per Cossack per year.

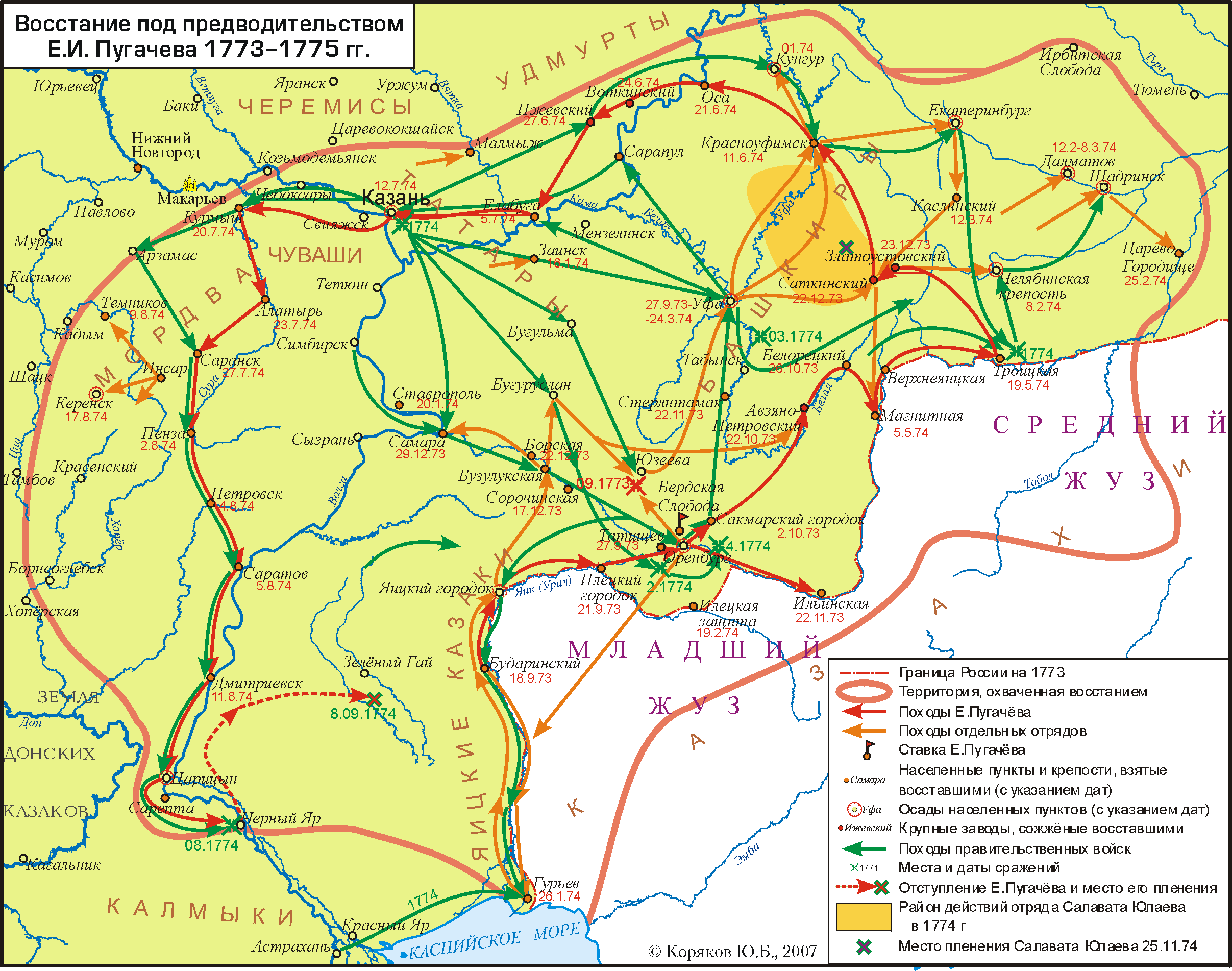
Map of the Pugachev's Rebellion

Pugachev found ready support among the odnodvortsy (single homesteaders). In the westernmost part of the region swept by the Pugachev rebellion, the right bank of the middle Volga, there were a number of odnodvortsy. These were descendants of petty military servicemen who had lost their military function and declined to the status of small, but free, peasants who tilled their own lands. Many of them were also Old Believers, and so felt particularly alienated from the state established by Peter the Great. They were hard-pressed by landowners from central provinces who were acquiring the land in their area and settling their serfs on it. These homesteaders pinned their hopes on the providential leader who promised to restore their former function and status.

The network of Old Believer holy men and hermitages served to propagandize the appearance of Pugachev as Peter III and his successes, and they also helped him recruit his first followers among the Old Believer Cossack of the Iaik.

The Iaik Cossack host was most directly and completely involved in the Pugachev revolt. Most of its members were Old Believers who had settled among the Iaik River. The Cossacks opposed the tide of rational modernization and the institutionalization of political authority. They regarded their relationship to the ruler as a special and personal one, based on their voluntary service obligations. In return, they expected the czar's protection of their religion, traditional social organization, and administrative autonomy. They followed the promises of Pugachev and raised the standard of revolt in the hope of recapturing their previous special relationship and securing the government's respect for their social and religious traditions.

Factory workers supported Pugachev because their situation had worsened; many state-owned factories had been turned over to private owners, which intensified exploitation. These private owners stood as a barrier between the workers and the government; they inhibited appeals to the state for improvement of conditions. Also, with the loss of Russia's competitive advantage on the world market, the production of the Ural mines and iron-smelting factories declined. This decline hit the workers the hardest because they had no other place to go or no other skill to market. There was enough material to support rebellion against the system. By and large the factories supported Pugachev, some voluntarily continuing to produce artillery and ammunition for the rebels.

== Challenge to the Russian state ==
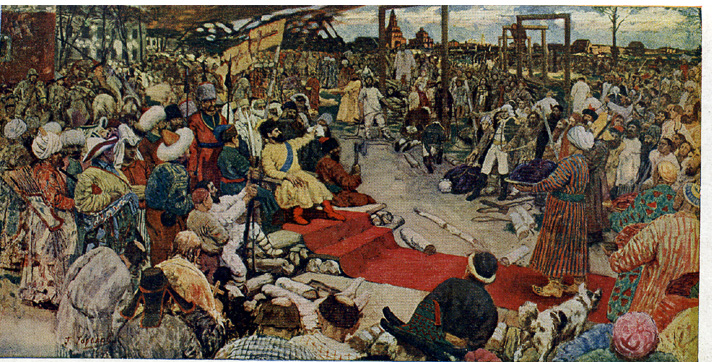
Pugachev in Kazan

In 1773, Pugachev's army attacked Samara and occupied it. His greatest victory came with the taking of Kazan, by which time his captured territory stretched from the Volga to the Ural mountains. Though fairly well-organized for a revolt at the time, Pugachev's main advantage early on was the lack of seriousness about Pugachev's rebellion. Catherine the Great regarded the troublesome Cossack as a joke and put a small bounty of about 500 rubles on his head. But by 1774, the threat was more seriously addressed; by November the bounty was over 28,000 rubles. The Russian general Michelson lost many men due to a lack of transportation and discipline among his troops, while Pugachev scored several important victories.

Pugachev launched the rebellion in mid-September 1773. He had a substantial force composed of Cossacks, Russian peasants, factory serfs, and non-Russians with which he overwhelmed several outposts along the Iaik and early in October went into the capital of the region, Orenburg. While besieging this fortress, the rebels destroyed one government relief expedition and spread the revolt northward into the Urals, westward to the Volga, and eastward into Siberia. Pugachev's groups were defeated in late March and early April 1774 by a second relief corps under General Aleksandr Bibikov, but Pugachev escaped to the southern Urals, Bashkiria, where he recruited new supporters. Then, the rebels attacked the city of Kazan, burning most of it on 23 July 1774. Though beaten three times at Kazan by tsarist troops, Pugachev escaped by the Volga, and gathered new forces as he went down the west bank of the river capturing main towns. On 5 September 1774, Pugachev failed to take Tsaritsyn and was defeated in the steppe below that town. His closest followers betrayed him to the authorities. After a prolonged interrogation, Pugachev was publicly executed in Moscow on 21 January [O.S. 10 January] 1775.

== Indigenous involvement ==
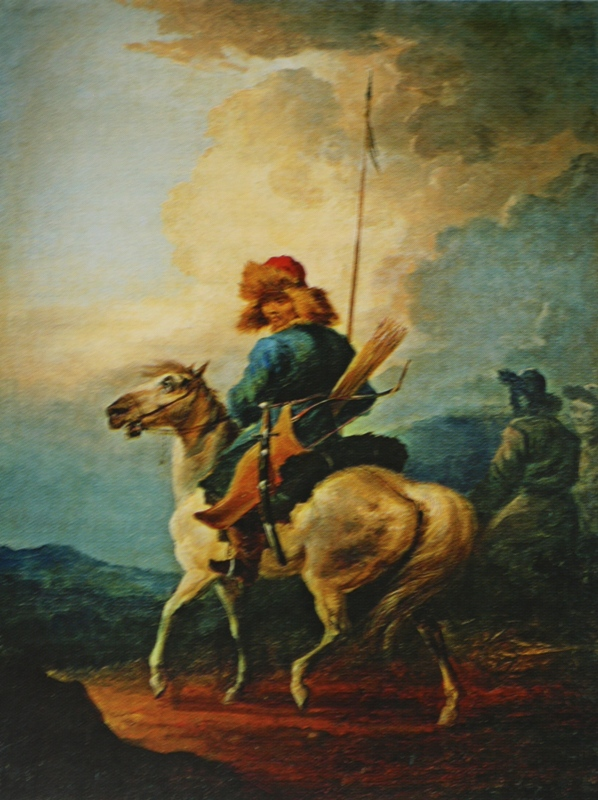
Bashkir riders from the Ural steppes

Pugachev's vague rhetoric inspired not only Cossacks and peasants to fight, but also indigenous tribes on the eastern frontier. These indigenous groups made up a comparatively small portion of those in revolt, but their role should not be underestimated. Each group had a distinct culture and history, which meant that their reasons for following Pugachev were different.

The Mordvins, Mari, Udmurts, and Chuvash (from the Volga and Kama basin) for example, joined the revolt because they were upset by Russian attempts to convert them to Orthodoxy. These groups lived within Russia's borders, but held onto their language and culture. During the Pugachev Rebellion, these natives responded by assassinating Orthodox clergy members. Because the natives professed allegiance to Pugachev, the rebel leader had no choice but to implicitly condone their actions as part of his rebellion.

The Tatars (from the Volga and Kama basin) were the indigenous group with the most complex political structure. They were most closely associated with Russian culture because they had lived within the empire's borders since the 16th century. Many Tatars owned land or managed factories. As more integrated members of the Russian Empire, the Tatars rebelled in objection to the poll tax and their military and service obligations. The Tatars were closely associated with the Cossacks and were a crucial part of Pugachev's recruitment efforts.

As a group, the Bashkirs had the most unified involvement in the rebellion. The Bashkirs were nomadic herdsman, angered by newly arrived Russian settlers who threatened their way of life. Russians built factories and mines, began farming on the Bashkir's former land, and tried to get the Bashkirs to abandon their nomadic life and become farmers too. When fighting broke out, Bashkir village leaders preached that involvement in the rebellion would end Russian colonialism, and give the Bashkirs the political autonomy and cultural independence they desired. The Bashkirs were crucial to Pugachev's rebellion. Some of the memorable leaders of the rebellion, like Salavat Yulaev were Bashkirs, and historian Alan Bodger argues that the rebellion might have died in the beginning stages were it not for the Bashkir's involvement. In spite of their integral role, Bashkirs fought for different reasons than many of the Cossacks and peasants, and sometimes their disparate objectives disrupted Pugachev's cause. There are accounts of Bashkirs, upset over their lost land, taking peasant land for themselves. Bashkirs also raided factories, showing their aggression towards Russian expansion and industrialization. Pugachev thought that these raids were ill-advised and not helpful towards his cause.

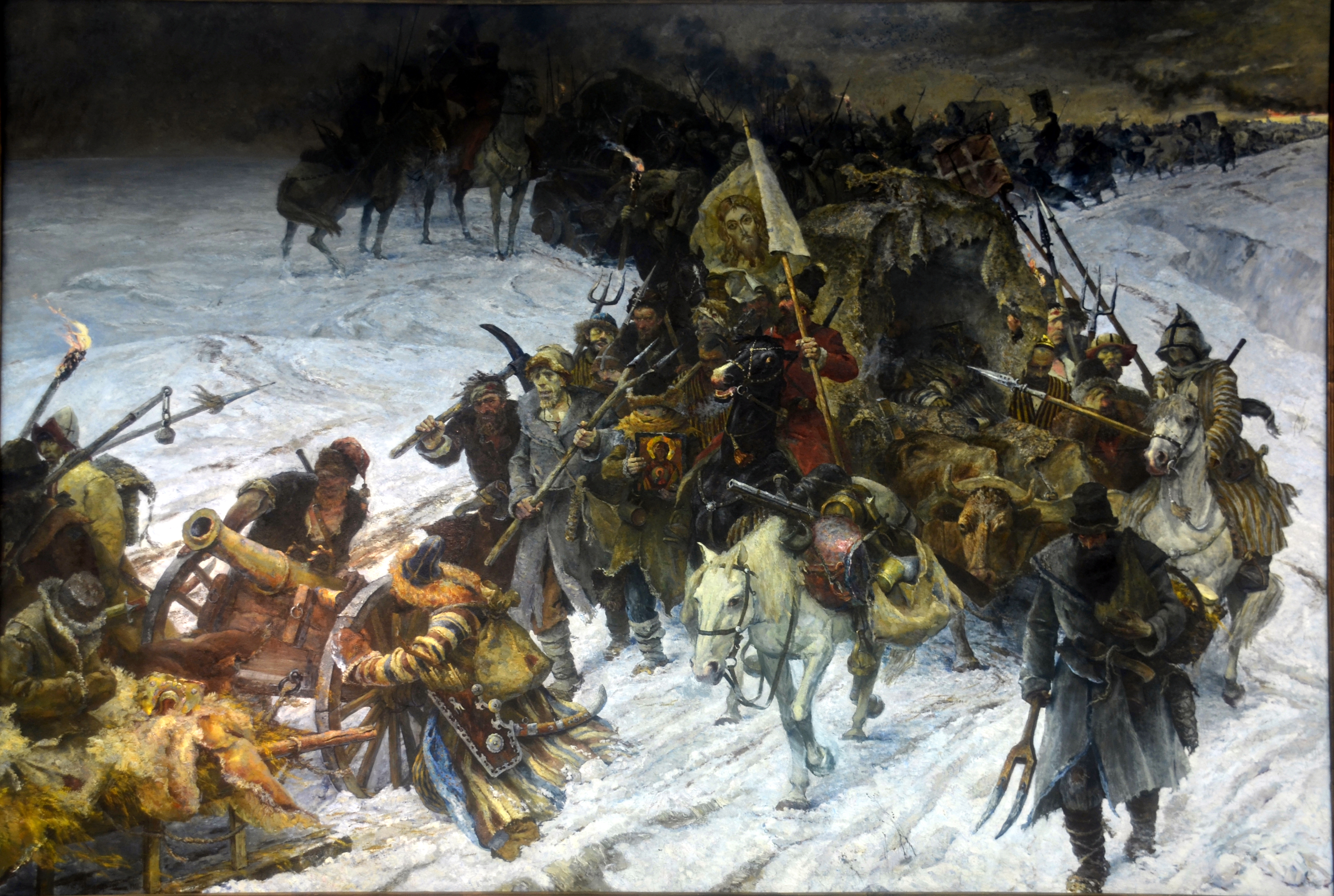
Rebels

While the Bashkirs had a clear unified role in the rebellion, the Buddhist Kalmyks and Muslim Kazakhs, neighboring Turkic tribes in the steppe, were involved in a more fragmented way. The Kazakhs were nomadic herdsman like the Bashkirs, and were in constant struggle with neighboring indigenous groups and Russian settlers over land. Pugachev tried hard to get Kazakh leaders to commit to his cause, but leaders like Nur-Ali would not do so fully. Nur-Ali engaged in talks with both Pugachev's and Tsarist forces, helping each only when it was advantageous for him. The Kazakhs mostly took advantage of the rebellion's chaos to take back land from Russian peasants and Bashkir and Kalmyk natives. In the summer of 1774, while Russian imperial troops were occupied in the Kazan region, Kazakh raiders launched over 240 raids along the Orenburg border, seizing numerous Russian subjects and livestock. They also took advantage of the chaos to target Volga German settlements. Historian John T. Alexander argues that these raids, though not directly meant to help Pugachev, ultimately did help by adding to the chaos that the Imperial forces had to deal with.

The Kalmyks' role in the rebellion was not unified either, but historians disagree about how to classify their actions. Historian Alan Bodger argues that the Kalmyks' role was minimal. They helped both sides in the conflict, but not in a way that changed the results. John T. Alexander argues that the Kalmyks were a significant factor in the rebel's initial victories. He cites the Kalmyk campaign led by II'ia Arapov which, though defeated, caused a total uproar and pushed the rebellion forward in the Stavropol region.

== Defeat ==
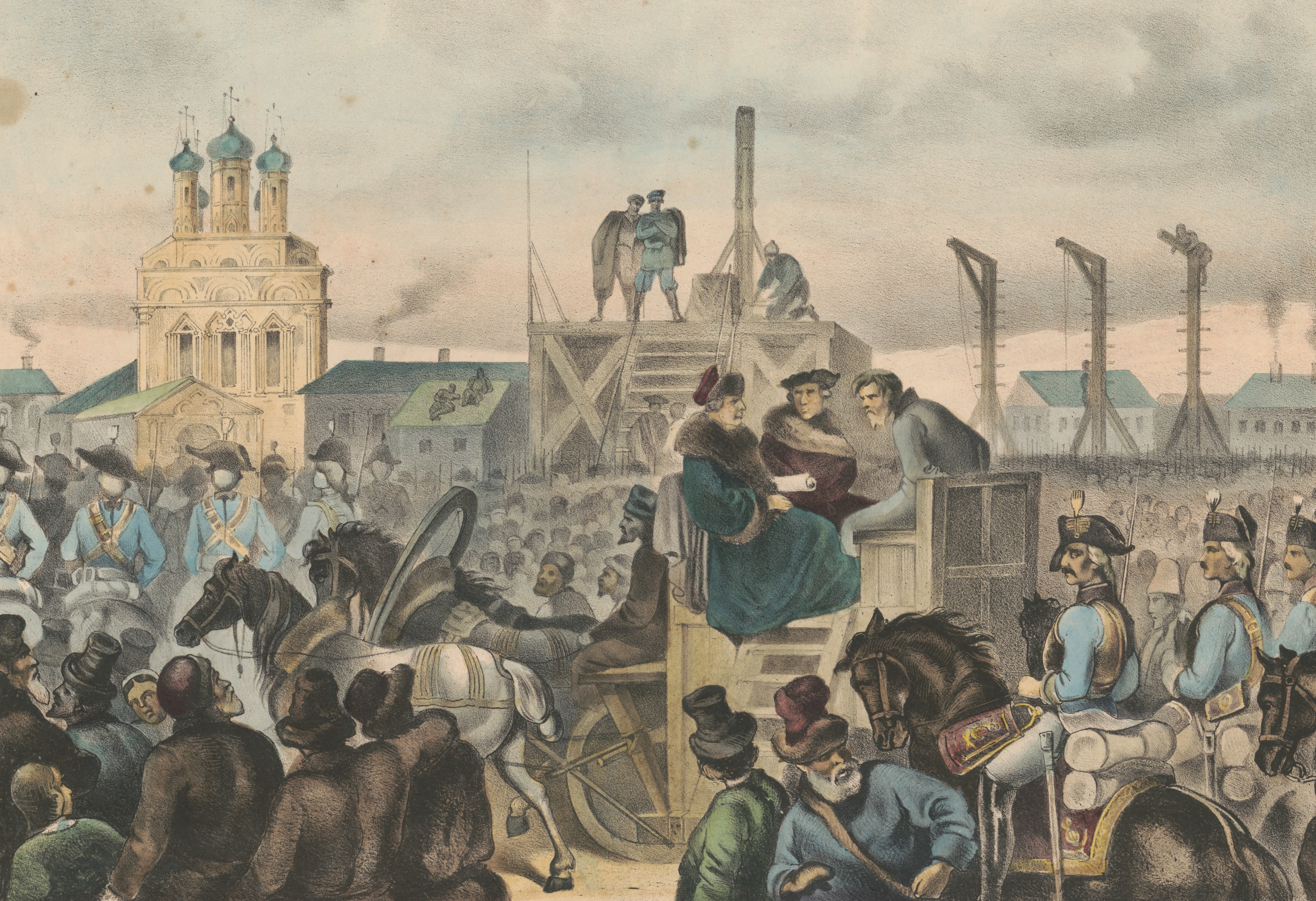
Pugachev's execution on Bolotnaya Square.

By late 1774 the tide was turning, and the Russian army's victory at Tsaritsyn left 9,000-10,000 rebels dead. Russian General Panin's savage reprisals, after the capture of Penza, completed their discomfiture. By 21 August 1774, Don Cossacks recognize that Pugachev is not Peter III. By early September, the rebellion was crushed. Yemelyan Pugachev was betrayed by his own Cossacks when he tried to flee in mid-September 1774, and they delivered him to the authorities. He was beheaded and dismembered on 21 January 1775, in Moscow.

After the revolt, Catherine cut Cossack privileges further and set up more garrisons across Russia. Provinces became more numerous, certain political powers were broken up and divided among various agencies, and elected officials were introduced.

== Assessments ==
The popular interpretation of the insurgency was that Pugachev's men followed him out of the desire to free themselves from the oppression of Catherine's reign of law. However, there are documents from Pugachev's war college and eyewitness accounts that contradict this theory. While there were many who believed Pugachev to be Peter III and that he would emancipate them from Catherine's harsh taxes and policies of serfdom, there were many groups, particularly of Bashkir and Tatar ethnicity, whose loyalties were not so certain. In January 1774, for example, Bashkir and Tatar generals led an attack on the City of Kungur. During the revolt the nomadic Kazakhs took the opportunity to raid the Russian settlements. Pugachev's troops suffered from a lack of food and gunpowder. Many fighters deserted, including one general who left the battle and took his entire unit with him. Cossack officers wrote in a report to their superior, Vasily Ivanovich Tornov, "For the sake of your eminence, we humbly request that our Nagaybatskaya Fortress be returned to us with or without a detachment, because there is not a single Tatar or Bashkir detachment, since they have all fled, and the starshins, who have dispersed to their homes, are presently departing for the Nagaybatskaya fortress." (Dokumenty stavki E. I. Pugacheva, povstancheskikh vlastei i uchrezhdenii, 1773–1774. Moskva, Nauka, 1975. Document number 195. Author's translation)

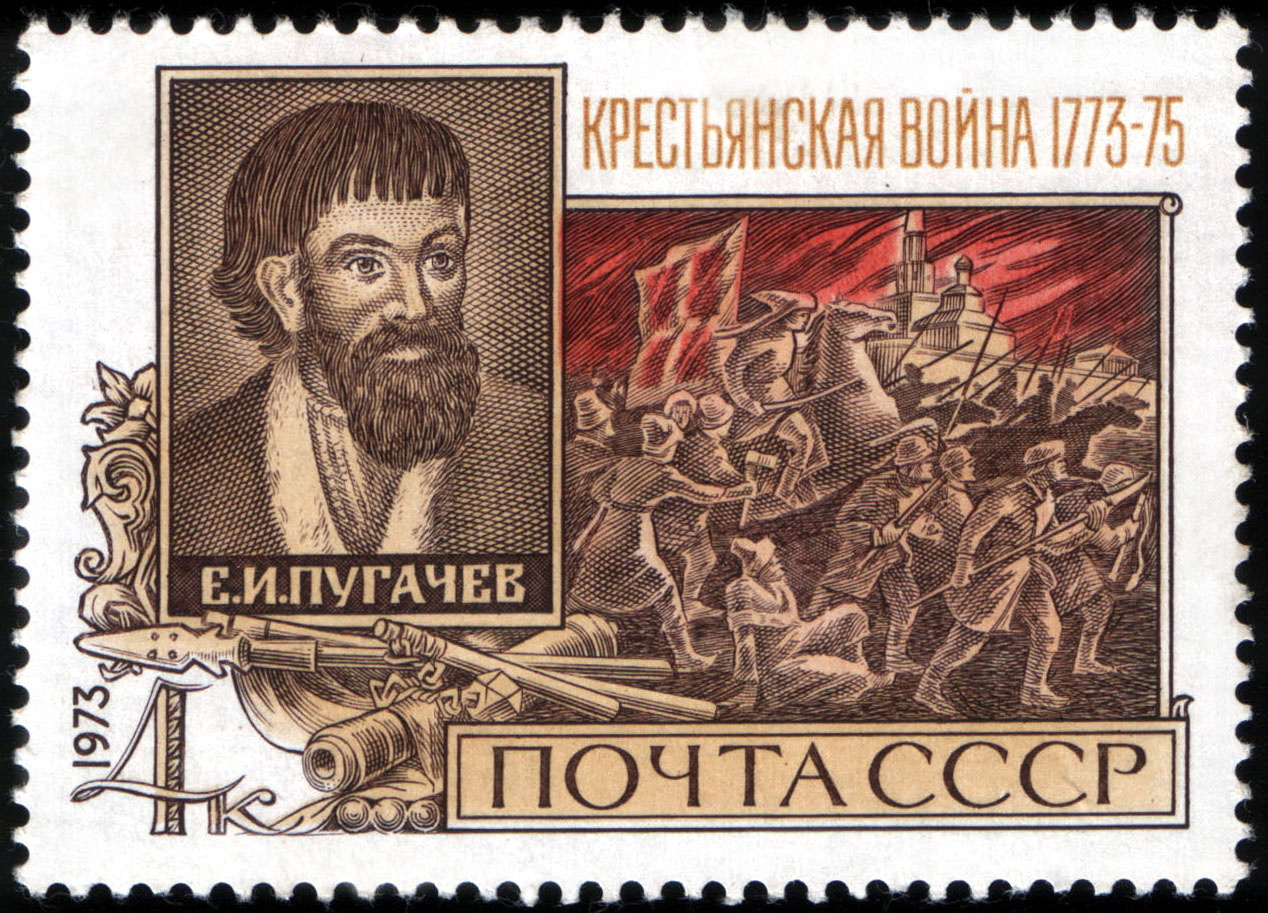
Soviet stamp, 1973

The concept of freedom was applied to the movement in regard to being free from the nobility. A peasant was to be free to work and own the land he worked. Pugachev's followers idealized a static, simple society where a just ruler guaranteed the welfare of all within the framework of a universal obligation to the sovereign. The ruler ought to be a father to his people, his children; and power should be personal and direct, not institutionalized and mediated by land- or serf owner. Such a frame of mind may also account for the strong urge to take revenge on the nobles and officials, on their modern and evil way of life.

Pugachev's followers were particularly frightened by apparent economic and social changes. They wished to recapture the old ideals of service and community in a hierarchy ordained by God. They needed a palpable sense of direct relationship with the source of sovereign power. The Cossacks were most keenly aware of the loss of their special status and direct contact with the czar and his government.

The imperial government endeavored to keep the matter of the rebellion strictly secret or, failing that, to portray it as a minor outbreak that would soon be quelled. The absence of an independent Russian press at the time, particularly in the provinces, meant that foreigners could read only what the government chose to print in the two official papers, or whatever news they could obtain from correspondents in the interior. (Alexander, 522) Russian government undertook to propagate in the foreign press its own version of events and directed its representatives abroad to play down the revolt.

The Russian government favored the use of manifestos to communicate with the people of Russia. Catherine thought that exhortations to abandon him would excite popular antipathy for his cause and elicit divisions within rebel ranks. Her printed pronouncements were widely distributed in the turbulent areas; they were read on the public squares and from the parish pulpits. In the countryside local authorities were instructed to read them to gatherings of the people, who were then required to sign the decree. These government proclamations produced little positive effect. They actually added more confusion and even provoked unrest when the peasantry refused to believe or sign them.

Much of the blame for the spread of the insurrection must be laid on the local authorities in Russia. "They were lax, timid, and indecisive; their countermeasures were belated, futile, and lost lives needlessly." Catherine herself recognized this assessment. As Catherine said "I consider the weak conduct of civil and military officials in various localities to be as injurious to the public welfare as Pugachev and the rabble he has collected." The weakness could not have been entirely the fault of the officials. The local bureaucracy in Russia was too remote and too inefficient to adequately deal with even the most basic administrative matters.

Pugachev's success in holding out against suppression for over a year proved to be a powerful incentive for future reforms. It made apparent to the government several problems with their treatment of the provinces. They were left weakly controlled and consequently, susceptible to outbreaks of peasant violence. The most crucial lesson Catherine II drew from the Pugachev Rebellion, was the need for a firmer military grasp on all parts of the Empire, not just the external frontiers. For instance, when the governor of the Kazan Governorate called for assistance against the approaching Pugachev, there was no force available to relieve him. The revolt did occur at a sensitive point in time for the Russian government because many of their soldiers and generals were already engaged in a difficult war on the southern borders with Ottoman Turkey. However, the professional army available outside the gates of Kazan to counter the Cossack-based army of Pugachev only consisted of 800 men.

== Media ==
- In The Captain's Daughter (1836 historical novel by Alexander Pushkin), imperial officer Pyotr Grinyov is sent to a remote outpost. While traveling he is lost in a snowstorm, where he encounters a stranger who guides him to safety. He gratefully gives the stranger his fur coat and they part ways when the storm ends. Later his outpost is attacked by Pugachev's forces, led by the stranger - who turns out to be Pugachev himself. Pugachev, impressed with the young man's integrity, offers him a place in his army. The officer has to choose between loyalty to his commission or following the charismatic Pugachev.
- Bulat-Batır, a 1928 silent historical drama film, believed to be the first Tatar film and probably the only Tatar full-length feature silent film. The film is devoted to the Pugachev Rebellion and its alternative names include (Russian: Пугачёвщина, romanized: Pugachyovshchina), Flames on Volga and Revolt in Kazan.
- Tempest, a 1958 adaptation of The Captain's Daughter produced by Dino De Laurentiis and directed by Alberto Lattuada. It starred Geoffrey Horne as Piotr Grinov, Silvana Mangano as Masha Mironova and Van Heflin as Emelyan Pugachov.
- The third season of the 2014 Russian television series Ekaterina partly focused on the Pugachev Rebellion.

== Sources ==
- Alexander, John T. (1969). Autocratic politics in a national crisis: the Imperial Russian government and Pugachev's revolt, 1773-1775. Bloomington: Indiana University Press.
- Alexander, John T. (1970a). "Recent Soviet Historiography on the Pugachev Revolt: A Review Article". Canadian-American Slavic Studies. 4 (3). Brill Publishers: 602–617. doi:10.1163/221023970X00716. ISSN 2210-2396.
- Alexander, John T. (1970b). "Western Views of the Pugachev Rebellion". Slavonic and East European Review. 48 (113). Modern Humanities Research Association and University College London, School of Slavonic and East European Studies: 520–536. eISSN 2222-4327. ISSN 0037-6795.
- Alexander, John T. (1973). Emperor Of The Cossacks: Pugachev and the Frontier Jacquerie of 1773-1775. Lawrence, Kansas: Coronado Press.
- Avrich, Paul (1972). Russian Rebels, 1600-1800. New York: Schocken Books.
- Bodger, Alan (1988). "The Kazakhs and the Pugachev uprising in Russia, 1773-1775". Research Institute for Inner Asian Studies (11). Bloomington: Indiana University.
- Bodger, Alan (1991). "Nationalities in History: Soviet Historiography and the Pugačëvščina". Jahrbücher für Geschichte Osteuropas. 39 (4).
- Commercio, Michele E. (2004). "The 'Pugachev rebellion' in the context of post-Soviet Kazakh nationalization". Nationalities Papers. 32 (1): 87–113. doi:10.1080/0090599042000186205. ISSN 0090-5992. S2CID 154353007 – via ResearchGate.
- De Madariaga, Isabel (1981). Russia in the Age of Catherine the Great. New Haven: Yale University Press. pp. 239–255. ISBN 0-300-02515-7.
- Forster, Robert (1970). Preconditions of Revolution in Early Modern Europe. Baltimore: Johns Hopkins Press. ISBN 9780801811760.
- Jones, Robert Edward (1973). The Emancipation of the Russian Nobility, 1762-1785. Princeton: Princeton University Press. ISBN 9780691052083.
- Kagan, Donald; Ozment, Steven; Turner, Frank (2002). The Western Heritage, Eighth Edition. New York, New York: Prentice Hall Publishing. Archived from the original on 13 February 2006.
- Longworth, Philip (1973). "The Pugachev Revolt: The Last Great Cossack-Peasant Rising". Journal of European Studies. 3 (1). SAGE Publications. doi:10.1177/004724417300300101. eISSN 1740-2379. ISSN 0047-2441. S2CID 162422918.
- Longworth, Philip (1975). "The Pretender Phenomenon in Eighteenth Century Russia". Past & Present (66). Oxford University Press: 61–84. doi:10.1093/past/66.1.61. eISSN 1477-464X. ISSN 0031-2746.
- Pushkin, Aleksandr Sergeevich (2000). The Complete Works of Alexander Pushkin: History of the Pugachev Rebellion. Downham Market: Milner & Company Ltd.
- Raeff, Marc (1970). "Pugachev's rebellion". In Forster, Robert (ed.). Preconditions of Revolution in Early Modern Europe. Baltimore: Johns Hopkins Press. pp. 197 ff. ISBN 9780801811760.
- Raeff, Marc (2009). "Pushkin's The History of Pugachev: Where Fact Meets the Zero-Degree of Fiction" (PDF). In Bethea, David M. (ed.). The Superstitious Muse: Thinking Russian Literature Mythopoetically. Boston: Academic Studies Press. pp. 301–322. doi:10.2307/j.ctt1zxsj7q.17. ISBN 9781934843178. JSTOR j.ctt1zxsj7q.17.
- Yaresh, Leo (1957). "The 'Peasant Wars' in Soviet Historiography". American Slavic and East European Review. 16 (3): 241–259. doi:10.2307/3001170. JSTOR 33001170.

In other languages

- Akademiia nauk SSSR [Academy of Sciences of the USSR] (1975). In-t istorii SSSR [History of the USSR] (in Russian). Moscow: Tsentralʹnyi gosudarstvennyi arkhiv drevnikh aktov SSSR [Central government archive of ancient acts of the USSR].
- Pugachevshchina [Dark Deeds of Pugachev] (in Russian). Moscow: Gosizdat. [1926-1931]
- Palmer, Elena (2005). Peter III - Der Prinz von Holstein (in German). Erfurt, Germany: Sutton Publishing. ISBN 978-3-89702-788-6.
