= Maria Mironova (character) =

Fictional character a novel by Pushkin

- Created by: Alexander Pushkin

In-universe information
- Species: Human
- Gender: Female
- Spouse: Pyotr Grinyov

Maria Ivanovna Mironova (often Maria Ivanovna Mironova, Masha Mironova) (Russian: Маша Миронова) is the titular heroine of the historical novel by A. S. Pushkin, The Captain's Daughter (1836). She is the daughter of the commandant of the Belogorsk fortress, who rejects Shvabrin and becomes the wife of Pyotr Grinyov. She appears in a number of film adaptations.

== Role in the plot ==
Masha Mironova is the daughter of Belogorsk fortress commandant Ivan Kuzmich Mironov and his wife, Vasilisa Yegorovna. At the beginning of the narrative, she is described as "a girl of about eighteen, round-faced, ruddy, with light-brown hair smoothly combed back behind her ears." Before the arrival of Pyotr Grinyov, at the fortress, Alexey Shvabrin had fallen in love with Masha, but she rejected his proposal. Grinyov, who at first regarded the "captain's daughter" with prejudice, as Shvabrin had characterized her as a foolish person, later also fell in love with her and found his affection reciprocated. Because of Masha, a duel took place between Shvabrin and Grinyov: the former claimed to know the girl's "character and habits" and that her favor could be won by buying her a pair of earrings. Grinyov was wounded, and the cause of the duel remained unknown to those around them.

When the Pugachevites captured the Belogorsk fortress, Masha's parents were killed. Grinyov was released by Pugachev to Orenburg, while Masha remained in the fortress at the mercy of Shvabrin, who had gone over to the rebels and become the new commandant. Later, Shvabrin began to coerce her into marriage. Masha managed to send a letter to Grinyov; he sought Pugachev's help, and in the end Shvabrin was compelled to release the girl. She went to Grinyov's parents, who grew fond of her and approved of their son's choice. When Grinyov was sentenced to death—later commuted to perpetual exile—for his association with the rebels, Masha pleaded successfully for his pardon from Empress Catherine II. She later became Grinyov's wife.

== Creation and reception ==
The daughter of the "old commandant" of the fortress first appears in the outline of the novel, composed by Pushkin after March–April 1833. According to this outline, the father hid the girl from the Pugachevites in a "nearby fortress," which was soon taken by storm. The protagonist, who here bears the surname Basharin and has joined the rebels, turned out to be "first in the assault" and demanded the commandant's daughter as his reward. In the next outline, dating from the winter of 1834/35, there appears Masha Gorisova, "Marya Ivanovna," the "spoiled daughter" of the commandant. The protagonist, this time Valuyev, falls in love with her "quietly and peacefully." The fortress is taken by the Pugachevites; Valuyev finds himself in Orenburg and there receives a letter from Masha. Pushkin scholars believe that the prototype of the heroine was Pushkin's contemporary Maria Vasilyevna Borisova, a young orphan who lived in the house of P. I. Vulf.

In the final text of the novel, Masha received the surname Mironova, and the central male character was divided into two: one hero, Shvabrin, rejected by Masha, goes over to Pugachev's side, while the other, Grinyov, who finds his affection reciprocated, remains on the side of the existing government. Pushkin made Masha the titular heroine, although she plays a much smaller role in the action than Grinyov and Pugachev. In this way, the author emphasized the novel's belonging to the genre of family chronicle and reinforced Masha's significance as a positive character.

Critics and literary scholars have assessed the image of the "captain's daughter" in various ways. Pyotr Vyazemsky saw in her a distinctive variation on the theme of Tatyana Larina, lending the events depicted in the novel a "gratifying and luminous hue." Pyotr Tchaikovsky, who intended to compose an opera based on The Captain's Daughter, lamented: "Marya Ivanovna is insufficiently interesting and distinctive, for she is a flawlessly kind and honest girl and nothing more." Marina Tsvetaeva characterized this image as "an empty space of every first love."

== Bibliography ==
- Абрамович С. Л. (1994). Пушкин в 1833 году. Хроника (10000 ed.). М.: Слово. p. 618. ISBN 5-85050-346-3.
- Красухин Г. Г. (2006). Путеводитель по роману А. С. Пушкина «Капитанская дочка»: учебное пособие. Издательство Московского университета. p. 125. ISBN 9785211052147.
- Добин Е. С. (1990). "История и роман (А. Пушкин «Капитанская дочка»)". История девяти сюжетов: рассказы литературоведа (2-е изд. ed.). М.: Детская литература. p. 176. ISBN 5-08-000278-6.
- Гиллельсон М. И.; И. Б. Мушина (1977). Повесть А. С. Пушкина «Капитанская дочка»: комментарий; пособие для учителя. Л.: Просвещение. p. 204.
- Макогоненко Г. П. (1987). "«Капитанская дочка» Пушкина". Избранные работы. О Пушкине, его предшественниках и наследниках (20000 ed.). Л.: Художественная литература. p. 640.
- Оксман Ю. Г. (1959). "Пушкин в работе над «Историей Пугачёва» и повестью «Капитанская дочка»". От «Капитанской дочки» к «Запискам охотника». Саратов: Саратовское книжное издательство. p. 314.
- Оксман Ю. Г. (1959). "Пушкин в работе над «Историей Пугачёва»". А. С. Пушкин. Собрание сочинений в 10 томах. Vol. 7. М.: ГИХЛ. pp. 371–410.
- Оксман Ю. Г. (1984). "Пушкин в работе над романом «Капитанская дочка»". Пушкин А. С. Капитанская дочка. Л.: Наука. pp. 145–199.
- Петрунина Н. Н. (1987). Проза Пушкина (пути эволюции). Л.: "Наука". p. 334.
