= Siege of Lyakhavichy =

Battle in Russo Polish War

Coordinates: 53°02′N 26°16′E

- Part of the Russo-Polish War (1654–1667)
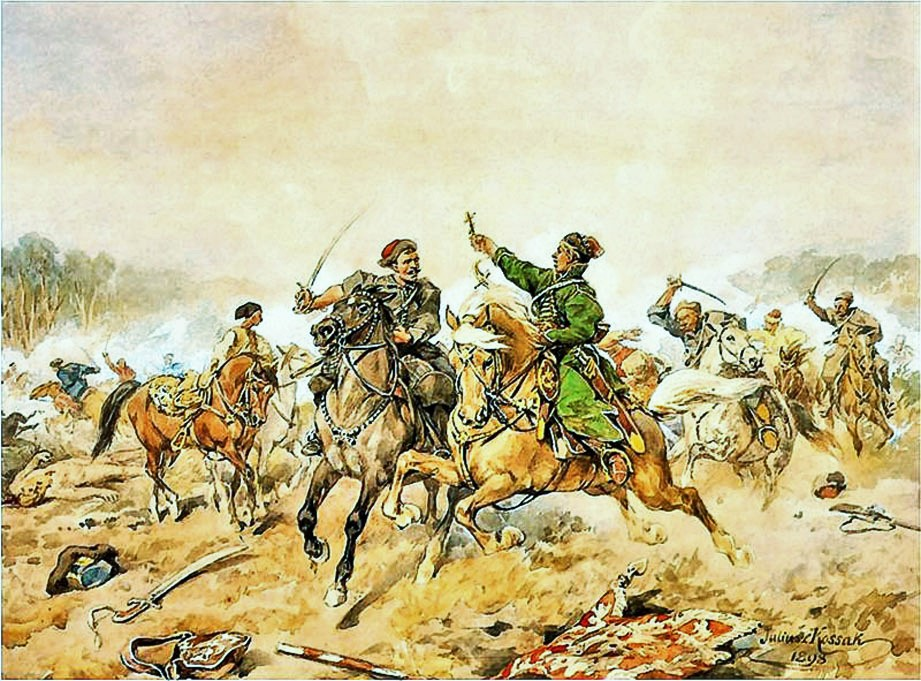
- Jan Chryzostom Pasek in the 1660 Battle of Lachowicze, by Juliusz Kossak
Date	23 March – 28 June 1660
Location	Lyakhavichy, Belarus
Result	Polish-Lithuanian victory

Belligerents
Polish–Lithuanian Commonwealth	Tsardom of Russia

Commanders and leaders
Mikołaj Władysław Judycki; Jan Chryzostom Pasek	Ivan Khovansky

Strength
2,500	11,000

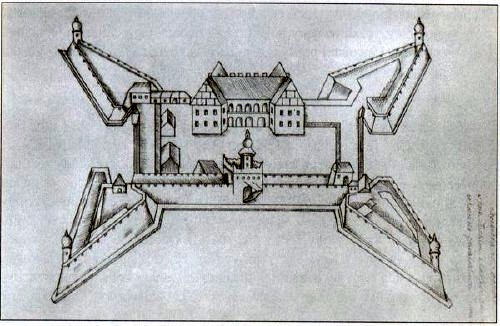
Lachowicze castle around 17th century

The siege of Lyakhavichy or Lachowicze took place from 23 March to 28 June 1660 during the Russo-Polish War (1654–67). Lachowicze was one of the major Grand Duchy of Lithuania strongholds in the disputed region (modern Belarus). A Russian army of about 11,000 under Ivan Nikitich Khovansky laid siege to the castle, defended by Mikołaj Judycki. After four failed sieges, Khovansky was forced to face a Polish relief army under hetmans Stefan Czarniecki and Paweł Jan Sapieha, and was defeated at the Battle of Polonka. This meant the end of the siege of Lachowicze.

Lachowicze was the only fortress of the Grand Duchy of Lithuania that evaded capture by Russians during that war. Due to a legend that it was protected by the Mary, mother of Jesus it was compared to Jasna Góra (which recently withstood a similar siege).
