= Liahavichy Castle =

Former castle in Liahavičy, Belarus

Coordinates: 53°02′N 26°16′E

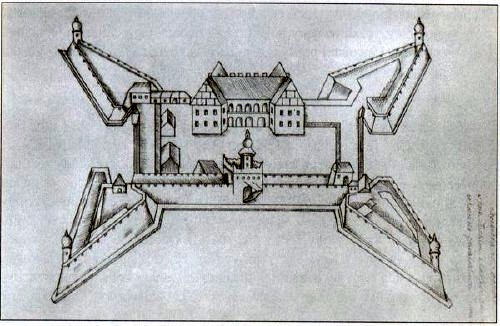
The castle in the 17th century

Liahavichy Castle (Polish: Zamek w Lachowiczach) was a fortified aristocratic residence and bastion fort in Lyakhavichy (historically Lachowicze), in present-day Belarus. Situated on the banks of the Vedzma River, it was one of the most formidable fortresses of the Grand Duchy of Lithuania during the 17th century. The castle was developed by Jan Karol Chodkiewicz, Grand Hetman of Lithuania, and subsequently belonged to the Sapieha family. It successfully resisted several sieges, most notably during the Russo-Polish War (1654–1667), but was severely damaged during the Great Northern War and eventually dismantled.

== History ==
The town of Lachowicze came into the possession of the Chodkiewicz family in 1572, initially belonging to Jan Hieronim Chodkiewicz. His son, Jan Karol Chodkiewicz, commissioned the construction of a modern bastioned fortress on the site of an earlier stronghold.

The castle in the modern coat of arms of Liachavičy

The precise date of construction is uncertain, although work is believed to have begun around 1602. A surviving letter from a Chodkiewicz estate official indicates that construction was already well advanced by 1615. The fortress was laid out on a roughly quadrangular plan, with four corner bastions, substantial earthworks faced with masonry, and a surrounding moat supplied by the Vedzma River. A residential palace stood within the fortifications, together with other buildings and a monumental gate tower. The castle passed to the Sapieha family through a dynastic marriage in 1635. During the mid-17th century, it withstood attacks by Cossack and Russian forces. During the Siege of Lyakhavichy in 1660 Russian forces under Ivan Khovansky besieged the fortress, defended by a garrison commanded by Mikołaj Judycki. The siege was lifted following the defeat of the Russian army at the Battle of Polonka. Lachowicze was among the few major strongholds of the Grand Duchy of Lithuania to remain unconquered by Russian forces throughout the war.

During the Great Northern War, the castle lost much of its military importance. In 1706, Swedish forces devastated the fortress and the nearby Catholic church. In the early 19th century, the remaining structures were sold to merchants, who dismantled the masonry of the bastions, ramparts and residential buildings for construction materials. Today, only traces of the former earthworks and archaeological remains survive.

== Bibliography ==
- Liahavichy Castle, Belarus
- Liahovichi district history
- Historical Sites of Lyakhovichi
