= Boguslav Kazimir Maskevich =

- Born: 1625
- Died: 1683
- Occupation: Writer

Boguslav Kazimir Maskevich (1625, Servech, Novogrudok Povet – April 4, 1683) was a military and public figure of the Grand Duchy of Lithuania, a writer–memoirist.

== Biography ==
The son of the famous nobleman Samuil Maskevich. Educated at the Novogrudok Collegium.

In 1643–1644, at the court of Prince Boguslav Radziwill.

In 1644 – at the court of Florian Zebrzydowski, a Lublin Kastelian. At the same time, he switched from Calvinism to Catholicism.

From 1646, in the service of Jeremiah Mikhail Vishnevetsky. Under his leadership, he took part in battles with Ukrainian Cossacks in 1646–1648.

As part of the regiment of Boguslav Radziwill, he took part in Janusz Radziwill's campaign in Polesie.

February 10–11, 1649 – participated in the capture of Mozyr.

February 20–22, 1649 – participated in the capture of Bobruisk.

July 31, 1649 – took part in the battle of Loyew.

In 1655, he was elected to the Tribunal of the Grand Duchy of Lithuania.

Ambassador to the Seimas in 1668, 1673, 1674.

From 1668, in the service of Casimir and Mikhail Pats.

In 1673–1674 – an armyman in Novogrudok.

== Oeuvre ==
Author of 2 diaries in Polish. The first, which covers the period 1643–1649, describes the military actions of Vishnevetsky, Nikolai Potocki, Martin Kalinovsky, Janusz Radziwill against the troops of Bogdan Khmelnitsky in Ukraine and Belarus. It contains many portrait and landscape sketches.

The second describes the campaign of the tsarist voivode Ivan Khovansky in Belarus at the beginning of 1660 and his defeat by the combined forces of hetmans Pavel Sapega and Stefan Charnetsky in the battle of Polonka. Maskevich's diaries are a valuable historical source.

== Sources ==
- Pamiętniki Samuela i Bogusława Kazimierza Maskiewiczów – Wrocław, 1961
- Diaries of the 17th Century (1594–1707): Samuil Maskevich, Boguslav Maskevich, Philip Obukhovich, Michal Obukhovich, Teodor Obukhovich / National Academy of Sciences of Belarus, Center for the Study of Belarusian Culture, Language and Literature, Institute of Literary Studies Named After Yanka Kupala – Minsk, 2016
- History of Belarusian pre–October Literature – Minsk, 1977 – Pages 215–216
- The Grand Duchy of Lithuania: An Encyclopedia. In 2 volumes. Volume 2: Cadet Corps – Yatskevich / Edited by Gennady Pashkov (editor–in–chief) and others – Minsk: Belarusian Encyclopedia, 2006 – Page 278
