= Battle of the Basya River =

1660 battle

- Part of Russo-Polish War (1654–1667)
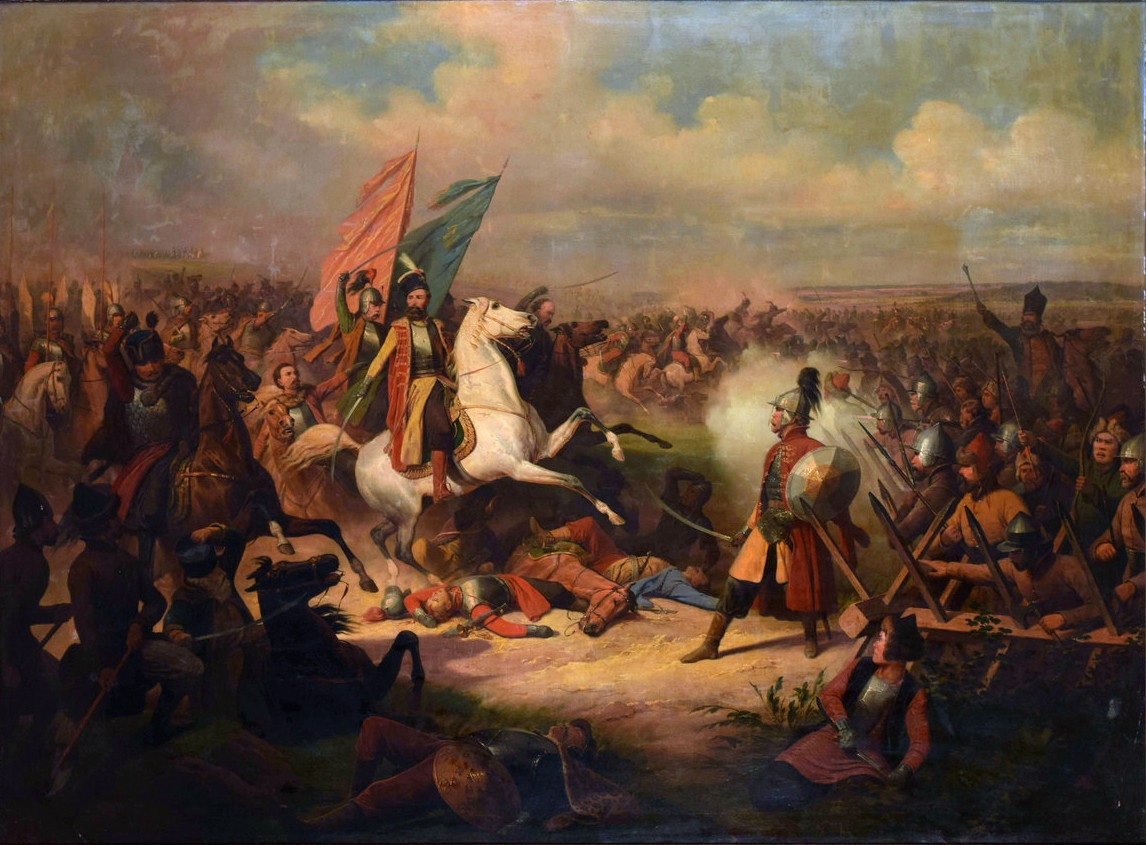
- Stefan Czarniecki during Russo-Polish War, by January Suchodolski c. 1875, Museum of the Eastern Lands of the Old Commonwealth; Episode of the battle on the Basya River, on the right, the use of Cheval de frise by the Russian infantry is visible
| Date | 24 – 28 September 1660 (Note: 4 – 8 October according to Gregorian Calendar) |
| Location | Basya River near Mahilyow, Grand Duchy of Lithuania (Present-day Belarus) |
| Result | See § Aftermath |
| Territorial changes | Crown Army lifts the siege of Mogilev |

Belligerents
| Polish–Lithuanian Commonwealth | Russian Tsardom |

Commanders and leaders
| Stefan Czarniecki; Paweł Jan Sapieha; Michał Kazimierz Pac | Yury Dolgorukov; Osip Sukin |

Strength
| c. 20,000; 20 cannons | 15,714; 45 cannons |

Casualties and losses
| 1,500 dead, captured and wounded | 1,099 dead, captured and wounded |

The Battle of the Basya River (Polish: Bitwa nad rzeką Basia) or Battle of Gubarevo (Russian: Битва у Губарево) took place 28 September 1660 near Basya river 40 kilometers from the city of Mogilev during Thirteen Years' War. Russian army fought against Crown and Lithuanians Armies. Neither side was able to gain a decisive victory and retreated to their camp, suffering significant losses. The combined forces were commanded by Stefan Czarniecki, who fought against Yuri Dolgorukov, who led his army to Belarus to replace Ivan Khovansky, who had been defeated earlier in the Battle of Polonka. The battle became one of the major battles of the war and the largest battle on the territory of Belarus in the century. Despite the fact that both armies retreated, the strategic consequences were on the side of the Russians, as the Poles and Lithuanians lifted the siege of Mogilev that started in summer and abandoned plans to attack Smolensk.

The battle is notable for the use of Cheval de frise, (in Russian Slingshots – Рогатки), previously unknown to the world, some authors believe that it was the experience of their use in this war that popularized "Frisian horses" in Europe.

== Prelude ==
=== Background ===
The campaign of Stefan Czarniecki's Polish army in the Grand Duchy of Lithuania against the Russian army in 1660–1661

Russians were defeated at the Battle of Polonka, and the Crown Army, along with the Lithuanians, launched a counteroffensive in Lithuania to expel the Russians from there. Czarniecki's ultimate goal was Smolensk. However, to begin with, the Poles had to occupy a system of fortresses on the Dnieper, the most important city there was rightfully Mogilev, control over it ensured control over the entire eastern Belarus. The siege of the city, which began on 30 July greatly worried Moscow, which immediately began to assemble a second army to be sent to the "Lithuanian Front", where only the defeated Khovansky army was then located. The new army was to be commanded by the best governor of Muscovy, Yuri Dolgoruky. The Poles hoped to take the city quickly, but the inhabitants remained loyal to Alexis and resisted the besiegers, repelling the assault on July 30, the garrison itself began to make sorties, destroying the siege works. The siege dragged on and the unblocking army was already approaching to help the fortress, the crown army lifted the siege and marched to meet the Russians.

=== Forces ===
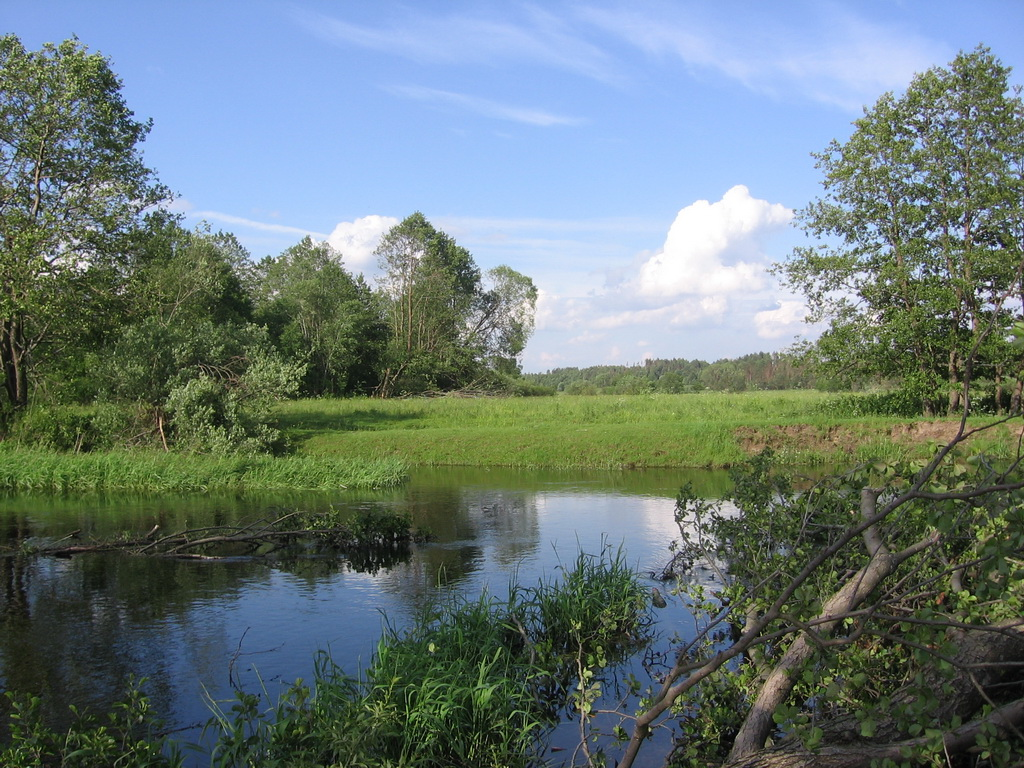
The river in our time

There are not enough sources to determine the exact number of all troops, so it is impossible to establish an absolute figure. The testimony of prisoners (including Voitech Vidovsky, Czarniecki's nephew) shows that the possible number of Sapieha troops is c. 6,000. The number of Mikhail Pac's squad was the same c. 3,000. The Polish historian Wimmer determined the more accurate number of the crown army, giving it 4,250, while the more modern Russian historian Babulin increases the number of troops to 4,500. Lithuanian Murashka volunteers also joined the battle, their number was 3,000, about 20,000 in total with 16–20 cannons.

Unlike the first case, the Russians kept accurate records of all their troops, Tsar Alexis ordered Dolgorukov to collect 16,000, he began collecting the army and in August moved to Smolensk, close to it, in the village of Romanovichi, on September 4, he reviewed the troops, which numbered 15,741 with 45 guns. An unpleasant surprise for the Poles was the presence of the so-called Cheval de frise by the Russians, who played a crucial role in the battle.

== First clashes ==
On September 24, the Russian army arrived in the village Gospodnya where the patrols established that the main forces of Poles and Lithuanians were located in the village of Ugly across the river. Dolgoruky planned locations in Gubarevo, the Russian vanguard came across Lithuanians and attacked them, putting them to flight, while the Russians lost 3 dead, 4 prisoners and 22 wounded.

Minor skirmishes took place in the following days, for example, on September 25, the Russians repulsed the attack of the Lithuanians, losing 4 killed and 10 wounded, the enemy lost 50 dead. On the evening of the same day, the Russians allegedly offered negotiations to the Poles, and on September 26, people from the Polish camp came to them. They asked what the Muscovites wanted, and the consequence was a flirtatious reply: "we don't need conversations, you'll need them more likely," the Poles became enraged and rushed at those who deceived them, but a large Russian detachment entered the field, surrounded and captured part of the army, among the prisoners was Chizh, Czarniecki's adviser.

The next day, there were no major skirmishes, everyone was preparing for battle.

== Main Battle ==
=== Flanks ===
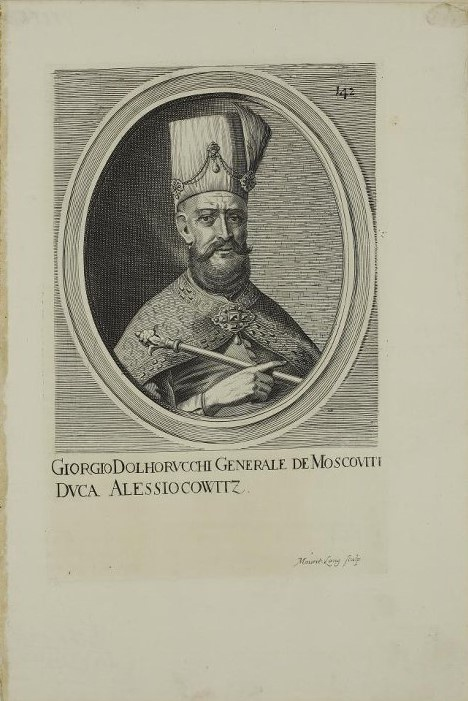
Prince Yuri Dolgorukov, Russian Commander during battle

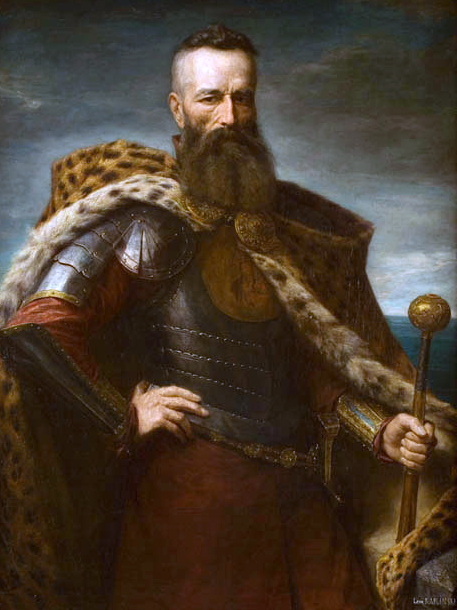
Stefan Czarniecki, Polish Commander during battle

The battle began around 8–9 a.m. and lasted until 6 pm. On the left flank, Dolgorukov personally commanded the Russians, and Czarniecki commanded the Poles. There was a counter-battle, where neither side could achieve clear success, so Sapieha sent 1,500 men to help Charnetsky, they hit the Russians in the rear, but were immediately stopped by hellish artillery fire. Russians began to benefit from the situation, and by evening Czarniecki began to retreat, but the situation was turned around by an attack by the Hussars, which completely disorganized the Russian ranks and forced them to retreat in partial disorder, but most of them were able to return to the wagon train.

The battle on right flank also began without obvious dominance of the sides, although the Russians were able to inflict heavy losses on the Lithuanians and captured banner, they could not completely defeat them for a long time. This was affected by the lack of strength in this group of troops, the Russians became even more demoralized when they saw the defeat of their left wing and the militia from the Landed Army fled. Reiters held out longer, but seeing the decomposition of their soldiers around them, they also trembled and began to retreat.

=== Centre ===
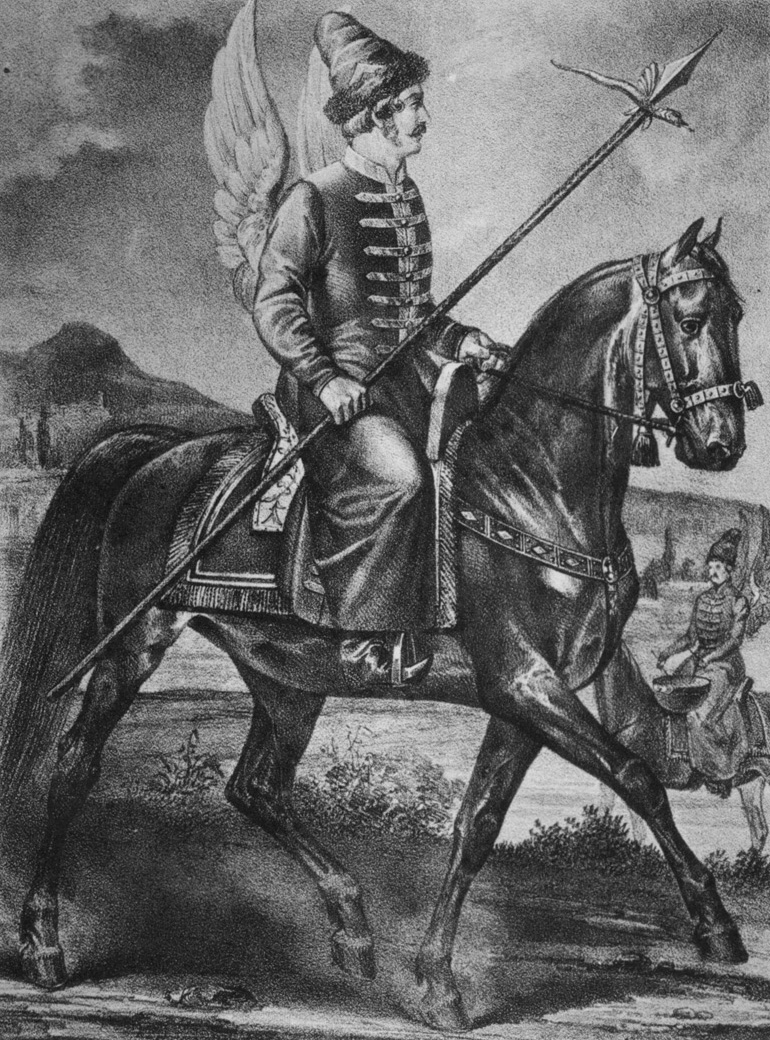
Russian cavalryman from the Novgorod Ryazryad, c. 1678

The largest and bloodiest battle took place in the center of the field, where the Lithuanian infantry and cavalry clashed with the Russian infantry. Lithuanian cavalry began the battle with an attack on the muscovites positions, due to the aforementioned presence of Russian "slingshots", these attacks were repulsed, Sapieha did not attach importance to this and made a fatal mistake for himself – he sent reinforcements to Charnetsky, seeing this, the Russian center decided to launch a decisive attack, which the Lithuanians did not expect, the Russians first broke the resistance of the light and the heavy cavalry, which began to crush its own infantry. In this massacre, the Russians systematically exterminated the Lithuanian center, Sapieha himself almost died: a horse was killed under him. The Lithuanians began to retreat in panic to their trenches, where they could cross the river. Russians captured a cannon, the cavalry did not suffer significant losses, because the Russians were engaged in the extermination of infantry, and many people died while trying to cross the river. "The river was filled with corpses," a participant in the battle reported. The final defeat of the Lithuanian infantry occurred simultaneously with the defeat on the flanks, which is why the Russian center was actually surrounded.

Dolgorukov, after being defeated on the flank, made a wise decision, he went to his center and commanded it surrounded until the evening, repelling constant attacks. Russians did not bend their will, and the Poles began to retreat, as did the Russians in general, but for the former it was more like fleeing: there was a stampede at the river crossing.

=== Casualties ===
The exact losses of Poles and Lithuanians cannot be determined due to the lack of sources. Dolgorukov mentioned 1,500 casualties in his letter, and Russian agents raised the losses to 3,000. The Pole Kochowski believes that the losses of the crown army alone amounted to 500 people. In general, the approximate loss figure just named by Dolgorukov – 1,500 has the most in common with reality. The total Russian losses in the battle amounted to 384 killed, 193 missing and 522 wounded, a total of 1,099 people.

== Aftermath ==
The hostilities resumed on 10 October after Russians received reinforcement by 900 men of voyevoda Maxim Rtishchev. The army of Dolgorukov managed to throw a forthcoming force of Michał Kazimierz Pac back to its camp but could not use this success further. Both armies found themselves in a stalemate and the slow approach of the winter in a ravaged environment was seen as a threat to both sides. The hostilities on the Basya river ended when the Poles heard the news of Ivan Khovansky campaign and decided to leave. Dolgorukov had no order of the Tsar to pursuit the Poles and stayed, awaiting reinforcement from his brother. In general, the battle ended in a draw, both sides retreated, suffering heavy losses, but the strategic outcome was major, Czarniecki lifted the siege of Mogilev and abandoned plans to retake Smolensk, which allowed some sources to declare the victory of the Russians.

== Sources ==
- Babulin, Igor B. (2025). Днепровский рубеж. Битва на реке Басе 1660 г. [The Dnieper frontier: Battle of the Basya river 1660]. Ratnoe Delo (in Russian). Moscow: Russkie Vityazy. ISBN 978-5-6051954-6-7.
- Samokvasov, D. Y. (1901). Акты Московского государства, изданные Императорской Академией наук (in Russian). Vol. III. Разрядный приказ. Московский стол, 1660–1664. Saint Petersburg: Типография Императорской академии наук.
- Kossarzecki, Krzysztof (2005). Kampania roku 1660 na Litwie (in Polish). Belarus: Inforteditions. ISBN 8389943018.
- Malov A.V. Russo-Polish War (1654–1667). Moscow: Exprint, 2006. ISBN 5-94038-111-1.
- Velikanov, Vladimir; Nechitailov, Maxim (2019). Азиатский дракон перед Чигирином [Asian dragon in front of Chigirin] (in Russian). Russian Academy of Sciences: Ratnoe delo. Moscow: Русские витязи. ISBN 978-5-6041924-7-4.
