= Naruszewicz =

Polish-Lithuanian noble and notable poet, historian

Naruszewicz is a surname. Notable people with the name include:

- Adam Naruszewicz (1733–1796), Polish-Lithuanian nobleman, poet, historian, dramatist, translator and cleric
- Aleksander Krzysztof Naruszewicz (died 1668), Polish nobleman, Lithuanian Deputy Chancellor
