= Palonka, Brest region =

Village in Brest Region, Belarus

Palonka Палонка
- Village
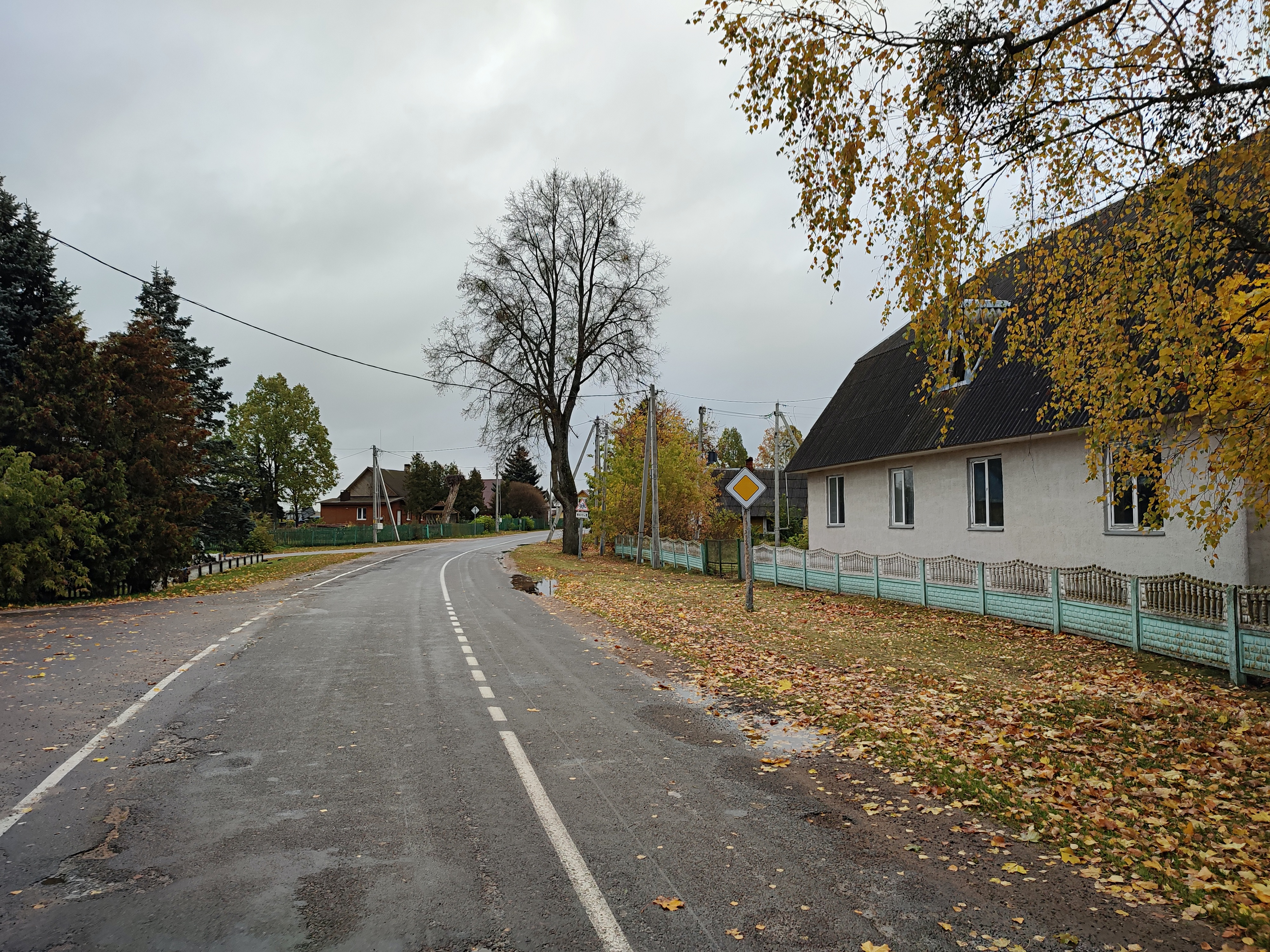

- Location within Belarus
- Coordinates: 53°8′46″N 25°42′48″E
- Country: Belarus
- Region: Brest Region
- District: Baranavichy District
- Time zone: UTC+3 (MSK)

Palonka (Belarusian: Палонка; Russian: Полонка, romanized: Polonka; Polish: Połonka) is a village in Baranavichy District, Brest Region, in western Belarus.

== History ==
Połonka was the site of two battles. In 1506 Lithuanians led by Stanisław Kiszka and Michał Gliński defeated invading Tatars. On 29 June 1660, during the Russo-Polish War of 1654–1667, the Poles led by Stefan Czarniecki and Paweł Jan Sapieha defeated invading Russians at the Battle of Polonka.

In 1680, Stefan Brzuchowski erected a Dominican monastery.

In the interbellum, Połonka was administratively located in the Nowogródek Voivodeship of Poland. According to the 1921 Polish census, the population was 80.9% Polish, 9.8% Jewish and 7.7% Belarusian.

Following the joint German-Soviet invasion of Poland, which started World War II in September 1939, Połonka was first occupied by the Soviet Union until 1941, then by Nazi Germany until 1944, and then re-occupied by the Soviet Union and eventually annexed from Poland in 1945.
