= Battle of Praga =

Battle during the Kościuszko Uprising

- Part of the Kościuszko Uprising
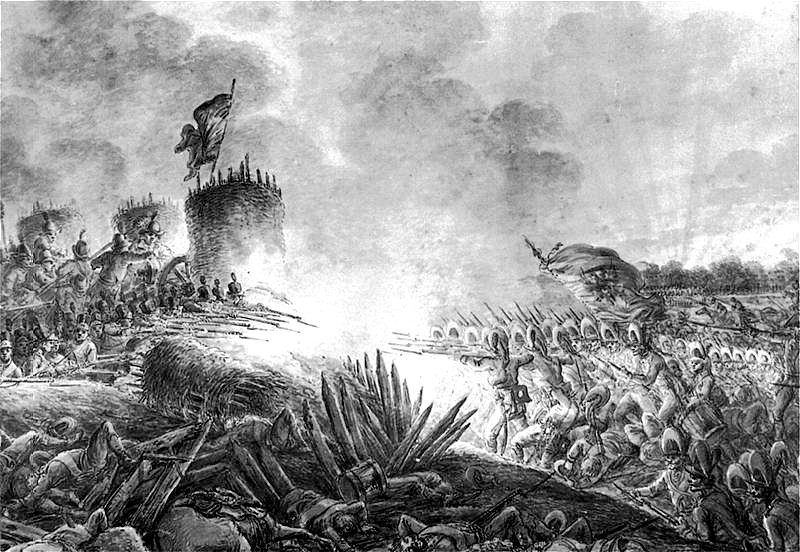
- Obrona Pragi, Aleksander Orłowski
Date	4 November 1794 (Note: 2 November (O.S. 22 October): pushing back Polish pickets (outposts) by the Russian troops; 3 November (O.S. 23 October): Russian bombardment, a substantial artillery duel; 4 November (O.S. 24 October): Russian assault on the suburb.)
Location	Praga, Warsaw, Poland–Lithuania
Result	Russian victory
Territorial changes	Capitulation of Warsaw

Belligerents
Russia	Poland–Lithuania; • Kościuszko Insurgents

Commanders and leaders
Alexander Suvorov; Pavel Potemkin; Wilhelm Derfelden; Ivan Fersen; Georgy Shevich Others: Tormasov Bagration Yermolov Barclay de Tolly Kulnev Wittgenstein	Józef Zajączek (WIA); Tomasz Wawrzecki; Jakub Jasiński †; Władysław Jabłonowski (POW); Berek Joselewicz; Jan Giessler (POW); Jan Meyen (POW); Gen. Krupiński (POW)

Strength
22,000: • 20,000 regulars; • 2,000 Cossacks.; 86 cannons	30,000: • 17,500 regulars; (Note: Some Polish estimates put the soldiers' number at 14,000. According to one of Russian estimates, 18,000. Suvorov's report to Pyotr Rumyantsev of 28 October [O.S. 17 October], which is based on Polish data, shows regular troops: 15,000 infantry and 2,500 cavalry. As Prof. W. L. Blease observed, the number of regular and partially trained soldiers was 24,000. As per Suvorov, "nearly all" of the 26,000 regular and 30,000 (per captured chiefs) at most.); • 12,500 irregulars.; 104 cannons

Casualties and losses
1,540–4,000 killed and wounded (Note: 2,000 or "slightly above".)	9,000–10,000 killed, died of wounds and drowned (excluding civilians) (Note: Of these 9,000–10,000 casualties, 8,000 soldiers died and were wounded in the course of storming. Another version put the death toll at 13,000.); 11,000–13,000 captured (including wounded and unarmed) (Note: Of the men taken alive and wounded, more than 6,000 were sent home; up to 4,000 were sent to Kiev, – from the regular army, without the scythemen, who were set at liberty with other non-military men. Some other estimates say 14,680 taken prisoner.) At least 101 guns
- 12,000 Polish civilians killed (Note: Petrushevsky: "According to a Polish source, 8,000 Poles in arms and 12,000 Praga residents killed." Bodart: "12,000 residents massacred." See Massacre section for more info.)

The Battle of Praga or the Second Battle of Warsaw of 1794, also known in Russian and German as the Storming of Praga (Russian: Штурм Праги) and in Polish as the Defence of Praga (Polish: Obrona Pragi), was a successful Russian assault on Praga, the easternmost community of Warsaw, during the Kościuszko Uprising in 1794. It was followed by a massacre (known as the Massacre of Praga (Note: The Polish term for the massacre, Rzeź Pragi, more literally translates as Slaughter of Praga, but most English sources translate it as "massacre".)) of the civilian population of Praga.

Praga was a suburb ("Faubourg") of Warsaw, lying on the right bank of the Vistula river. In 1794 it was well fortified and was better strengthened than the western part of the capital, located on the left bank of the Vistula. Historian and professor Friedrich Christoph Schlosser labelled Praga as "the key to Warsaw". The Praga battle marked the collapse of moral and material strength of insurgent Poland.

== Eve of the battle ==
=== Previous events ===
Russian commander Alexander Suvorov inflicted a series of defeats on the rebels: the Battle of Krupczyce on 17 September, where Suvorov's 12,000 soldiers were opposed by 4,000 Polish; the Battle of Brest on 19 September,—9,000 Russians fought here against 16,000 Poles; and the Battle of Kobyłka on 26 October, with 10,000 Russians ran into 4,500 Polish forces. After the Battle of Maciejowice, General Tadeusz Kościuszko was captured by Russians. The internal struggle for power in Warsaw and the demoralisation of the city's population prevented General Józef Zajączek from finishing the fortifications surrounding the city both from the east and from the west. At the same time, the Russians were making their way towards the city.

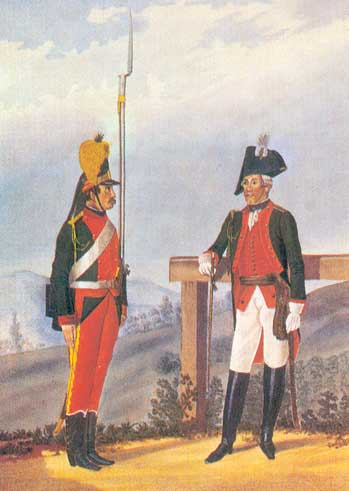
Russian infantry uniforms (1786 to 1796). Private and ober-officer—left to right. Lithograph, Russian Museum.

=== Opposing forces ===
The Russian forces consisted of two battle-hardened corps under Generals Alexander (Aleksandr) Suvorov and Ivan Fersen. Suvorov took part in the recent Russo-Turkish war, then in the heavy fighting in Polesie. General Lieutenant Baron Fersen fought for several months in Poland but was also joined by fresh reinforcements sent from Russia. Each of them had approximately 11,000 men.

The Polish-Lithuanian forces consisted of a variety of troops. Apart from the rallied remnants of the Kościuszko's army defeated in the Battle of Maciejowice, it also included a large number of untrained militia from Warsaw, Praga and Vilnius, a 500-man Jewish regiment of Berek Joselewicz as well as a number of scythemen (2,000 men) and civilians, plus 5,000 regular cavalry. The total number of irregulars was to be about 12,000 and the regular troops about 18,000. One of the sources, Suvorov's report dated 28 October [O.S. 17 October], claims 15,000 regular infantry and only 2,500 cavalry (17,500 regulars altogether) – according to the Poles–Lithuanians themselves. The forces were organised in three separate lines, each covering a different part of Praga. The central area was commanded directly by General Józef Zajączek, the northern area was commanded by Jakub Jasiński and the southern by Władysław Jabłonowski. In general, the forces defending Praga should be estimated at 22,000 to 26,000 men, although together with the townspeople involved, Praga was defended by 30,000 men, which is also indicated by Suvorov, and had 104 cannons. There is also a closer figure of 28,000 men. Suvorov came to the walls of Praga from his camp at Kobyłka with 16,000 to 18,000 (Note: All the troops the Russians could muster amounted to 18,000 men.) footsore troops (regulars) and 86 cannons. Suvorov also had 4,000 regular cavalry and 2,000 irregular Cossack cavalry at the assault. The total number of regular troops was up to 25,000 with as many as 7,000 regular cavalrymen; Cossacks were up to 5,000 – these were the corps of Derfelden (first and second columns; 4,600 men), Potemkin (third and fourth columns; 5,800 men), Fersen (fifth, sixth, and seventh columns; 7,000 men), and General Major Shevich's reserve (4,000 men). That is, the forces may have been roughly equal overall, however, largely due to the declining morale of the Varsovians, they put up just 2,000 men — irregular soldiers — to defend the ramparts. The main force, the regular troops, stood behind fortifications as a reserve on the vast field according to Kościuszko's plan. After a reconnaissance by the Russian side, up to 24,055 men, inclusive of 41 infantry battalions and 81 cavalry squadrons, would come out for the storming together with reserve units; in the village of Okuniew a wagenburg was stationed.

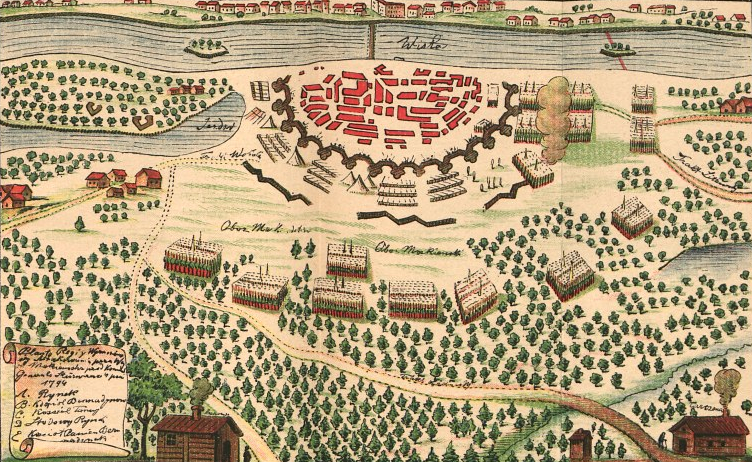
View of Russian assault on Praga

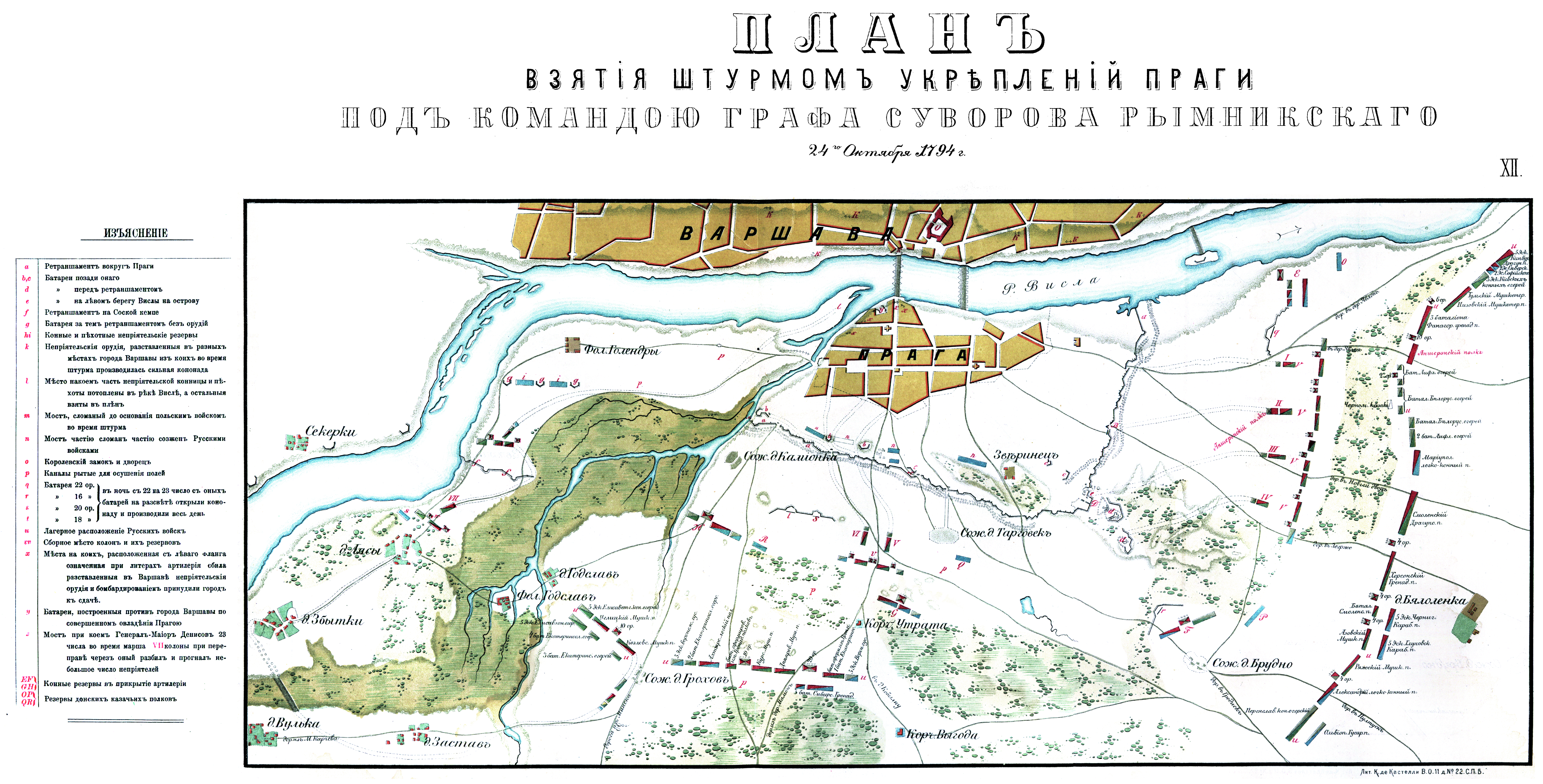
Storming plan by Leonid Bogusławski^{[ru]} (1892)

== Battle ==
The Russian forces reached the outskirts of Warsaw on 2 November 1794, pushing back Polish-Lithuanian outposts with bayonets, launching the reconnaissance and declaring the disposition. Immediately upon arrival, they started erecting artillery batteries and in the morning of 3 November started an artillery barrage of the Polish-Lithuanian defences. This made Józef Zajączek think that the opposing forces were preparing for a long stay there; the Russians disguised the forthcoming attack in order to give the rebels reason to expect a siege. The Polish artillery responded with vigour. However, Suvorov's plan assumed a fast and concentrated assault on the defences rather than a bloody and lengthy siege.

At 3 o'clock in the morning of November 4, the Russian troops silently reached the positions just outside the outer rim of the field fortifications. The defenders did not expect an attack on this day. First and second columns began preparations; besides, the Polish general fatigue and the low spirits of their leaders contributed to the fact that the Russian advance was noticed too late. The Polish forward posts, who stood at the back of the trous de loup, fled as soon as the attacker approached. Two hours later started an all-out assault.

General Wawrzecki arrived in Praga at 4 a.m. on 4 November and was talking with Zajączek. Suddenly shots rang out. Wawrzecki rushed to the left flank, where Jasiński commanded, and Zajączek to the right. Then Wawrzecki also went to the right flank. There were no orders for the reserves to operate in the inner field, and the battle turned into a random fighting, very persistent on the ramparts, but completely disorderly.

=== Derfelden and Potemkin's actions ===
Derfelden's columns took possession of the rampart without much difficulty. The Polish island batteries and on the Vistula's left bank tried to act in the flank of General Major Lacy's first column, (Note: As at the siege of Izmail, Lacy's column was engaged first.) led by the column-master Semyonov, but its shots did not reach their enemy and the 22 guns of Captain Begichev's battery answered their enemy with rapid fire. The Polish cavalry could easily hold Lacy in the open field behind the rampart, and the infantry in the narrow passage between the Vistula and the buildings; but it failed. Part of the Polish cavalry began to line up in front of the first column, but two squadrons of the Kiev Horse Jaeger under the command of Zoss "jumped over the ditch and with the greatest eagerness rushed on the crowd of enemy cavalry" and instantly knocked it down. The private reserve of the first column (Lieven's Tula Regiment) came in the interval between the columns, rushed to assault at the same time as the first column's main forces seized the rampart, and immediately began to arrange the crossing. Captain Begichev with his artillery and Brigadier Polivanov, who was covering him, bored with inaction and seeing the success of the storming, rushed forward of their own accord, crossed the passage of the Tula Regiment and began an artillery fire in flank and rear of the batteries of the third line of trenches.

Artillery Captain Sakovich (of Begichev's command) was wounded in the breast, but continued to operate his guns.

Lacy was wounded; Colonel Zherebtsov took the command instead of him, and Colonel Kokhovsky with his Phanagorians rushed to the bridge, drove his enemy from street to street and seized the head of the bridge, i.e. cut off the defender's way of retreat. Some of the Poles running in front of the column drowned in the Vistula, and some were captured. The trous de loup, the ditch, the rampart and the neighbourhood were littered with corpses. Generals Meyen and Krupiński became prisoners of war; Jasiński was killed with a sabre in his hand.

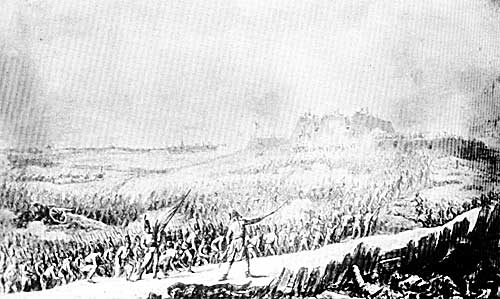
Storming of Praga (painting c. 1800–1802)

The second and third columns also took possession of the rampart almost without delay, so that in a very short time the rampart west of Piaskowa Góra (eng. "Sand Mountain") was in Russian hands. Prime Major Markov with the first battalion of the Apsheron Regiment climbed up the assault ladders on the rampart, hit the Poles from here with jaeger rifle fire, then broke into the fortress, drove the enemy in front of him, and took possession of the battery. The second battalion of the Apsheronians came in the rear of another battery, and no one escaped. Opposed on the rampart, the Poles joined with reinforcements and again rushed on the Apsheron battalion, but in vain, the Polish cavalry tried to take in the third column's flank, but two battalions of Kherson Grenadiers lined the front and rushed with bayonets—the Polish cavalry retreated. Then the second and third columns rushed straight into Praga.

=== Fourth column ===
Wawrzecki rushed from side to side, but order could not be restored.

Hardest of all was the fourth column of General Major Buxhoeveden, which attacked Piaskowa Góra and the menagerie.

The Byelorussian Jaeger Corps, at the head of the fourth column marched to the cavalier; the fourth battalion of the Livonian Jaeger Corps marched to the coal battery and to the menagerie.

Heavy artillery fire from the batteries, then from the cavalier, and rifle fire from behind the line of abatises entailed heavy losses, but the Russians did not stop; The Second Major Kharlamov of the Azov Regiment crossed the trous de loup and ditch, beat back two cannon, "through which he gave the whole column a way to go"; near the menagerie there was a fierce melee, which forced Buxhoeveden to divide the column into parts to facilitate the attack on the menagerie's vast park. The Poles, outflanked, finally gave up this stronghold as well; about this time the Polish powder cellar exploded, which further increased the disorder among the Poles. General Giessler, who commanded here, was taken prisoner with 20 officers. In the struggle with Buxhoeveden's column the 500 regiment of Jews showed strong persistence; but their colonel, also a Jew, Hershko, was not at this time with the regiment and preferred to remain in Warsaw.

=== Fifth and sixth columns' actions ===
If the fourth column endured a hard fight, but together with the first three columns, it made Fersen's task very easy. The fifth column of General Major Tormasov almost in one moment seized the ramparts and batteries, on the heels of the retreating broke into the suburb and reached the bridge after the first column. General Major Rakhmanov's sixth column was slightly delayed by the Poles, but also soon arrived in Praga.

=== Denisov's attack ===
General Major Denisov with the seventh column still at night occupied the Las village in front of the fortifications of Lieutenant Colonel Jabłonowski. A Polish deserter and prisoners told about the location of his batteries, trous de loup and the number of troops.

Under flank fire from the Vistula's left bank Denisov's troops moved forward through the trous de loup, in front went Colonel Count Apraxin with Kozlov Infantry Regiment; part of the troops went to the Polish rear waist-deep in water. Having taken possession of the batteries, Denisov sent his cavalry (6 squadrons of the Elizabethgrad Cavalry Regiment and Cossacks of Krasnov, Second Major Denisov and Colonel Popov) for pursuit. Having cut off the Poles' retreat; Denisov drove them to a spit, in the corner between the Vistula and a swampy channel; the cannons of Captain Rezvoy's artillery pierced through his enemy's crowd thickly huddled on the spit; the extermination was merciless; the Poles, seeking escape, threw themselves into the Vistula and perished in great numbers. And on the opposite bank of the Vistula, only half a kilometre (0.3 mi), the inhabitants of Warsaw were gathered, and their brethren perished before their eyes.

According to Denisov's testimony, the Poles lost 1,218 men killed, several hundred drowned, 16 cannons, and 3 artillery caissons; Jabłonowski himself and 1,300 officers and lower ranks were taken prisoner. Denisov then arrived at the bridge almost simultaneously with the first column. Warsaw was defenceless. The first, fifth and seventh columns were at the bridge and were free to cross to the Vistula's left bank. Panic spread among the Poles. Zajączek, lightly wounded by a bullet in the stomach, hurriedly left for Warsaw. "A real zając (hare)", the Poles said of him afterwards, alluding to his surname.

=== Fighting in the streets of Praga ===
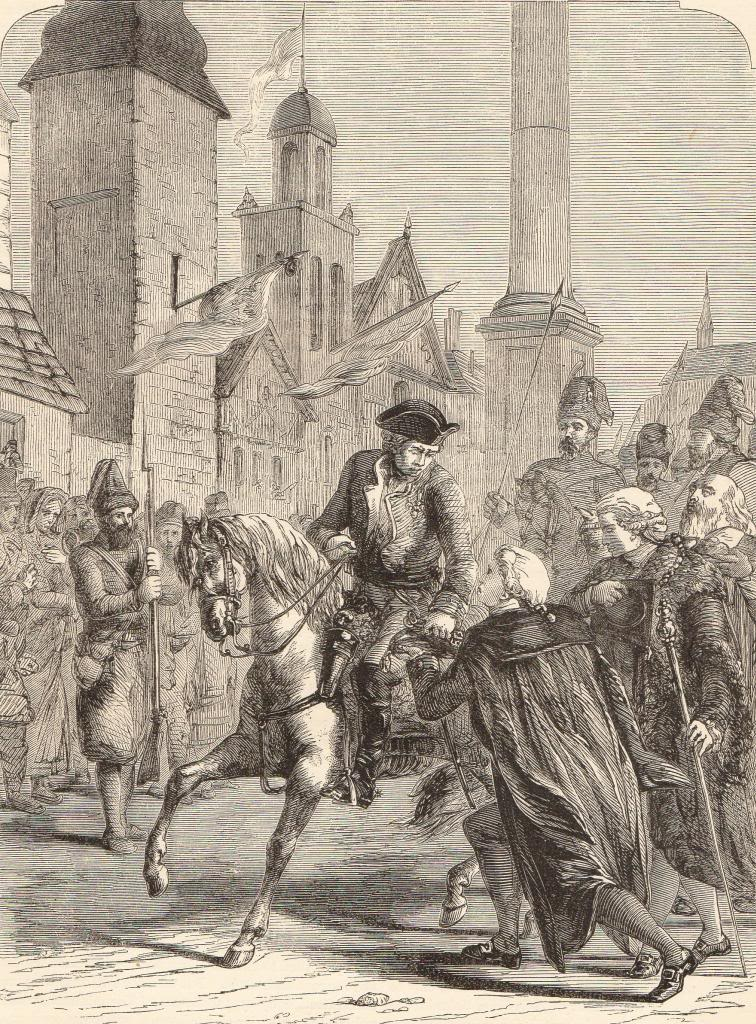
Suvorov entering Warsaw in 1794, 19th century depiction

General Wawrzecki tried to stop the fleeing Polish regiments, but all was for nothing. Accompanied by an officer and two natives, he rode through Praga. It was as if a tetanus had come over him, so that an officer and two soldiers took him off his horse, brought him to his senses, and carried him across the bridge on foot for greater safety. It was dawning; the day was quiet and clear, the sun was shining and illuminating the bloodshed that was taking place in the suburb; the Russian jaegers were entering the bridge, and the Polish commander-in-chief was horrified,—what a terrible and near danger threatened the capital! Near the bridge stood cannon, but the artillerymen hid in the houses, so Wawrzecki himself pulled out one, brought him to the cannon and forced him to shoot. At last, the Polish guard came out, and the inhabitants joined it and began to break the bridge. The Russians on the other side broke part of the bridge, "burned and thus interrupted the enemy's withdrawal"—the immediate transition to the left bank was not part of Suvorov's calculations. The fire shifted from the bridge to the suburb houses and Praga went up in flames.

The main rampart was taken by the Russians in 1,5 hours after the assault beginning, and at 9 a.m. Praga was occupied.

Suvorov himself was on a hill, a kilometre (0.6 mi) from the Polish fortifications at Piaskowa Góra, i.e. he was approximately in the middle of the line of his troops, which facilitated the task of monitoring and controlling the course of battle. By the speed with which the Russians appeared at the fortifications and moved forward, as well as by the reports of orderlies and chiefs, he saw that the troops fought not only with special energy, but also with extreme fierceness.

=== Brief summary ===
Thus, the defenders were completely surprised and shortly thereafter the defence lines were broken into several isolated pockets of resistance, bombarded by the Russians with canister shots with a devastating effect. General Zajączek retreated from his post, leaving the remainder of his forces without a single command. This made the Poles and Lithuanians retreat towards the centre of Praga and then towards Vistula.

The heavy fighting lasted for four hours and resulted in a complete defeat of the Polish-Lithuanian forces. Joselewicz survived, being severely wounded, but almost all of his command was annihilated; Jasiński was killed fighting bravely on the front line. Only a small part managed to evade encirclement and retreated to the other side of the river across a bridge; hundreds of soldiers and civilians fell from a bridge and drowned in the process.

== Massacre ==
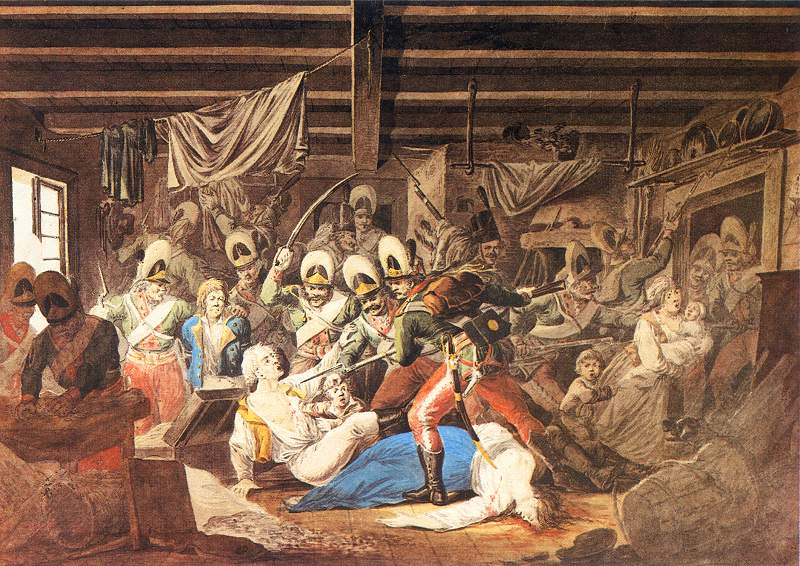
Rzeź Pragi (Slaughter of Praga) by Aleksander Orłowski, 1810

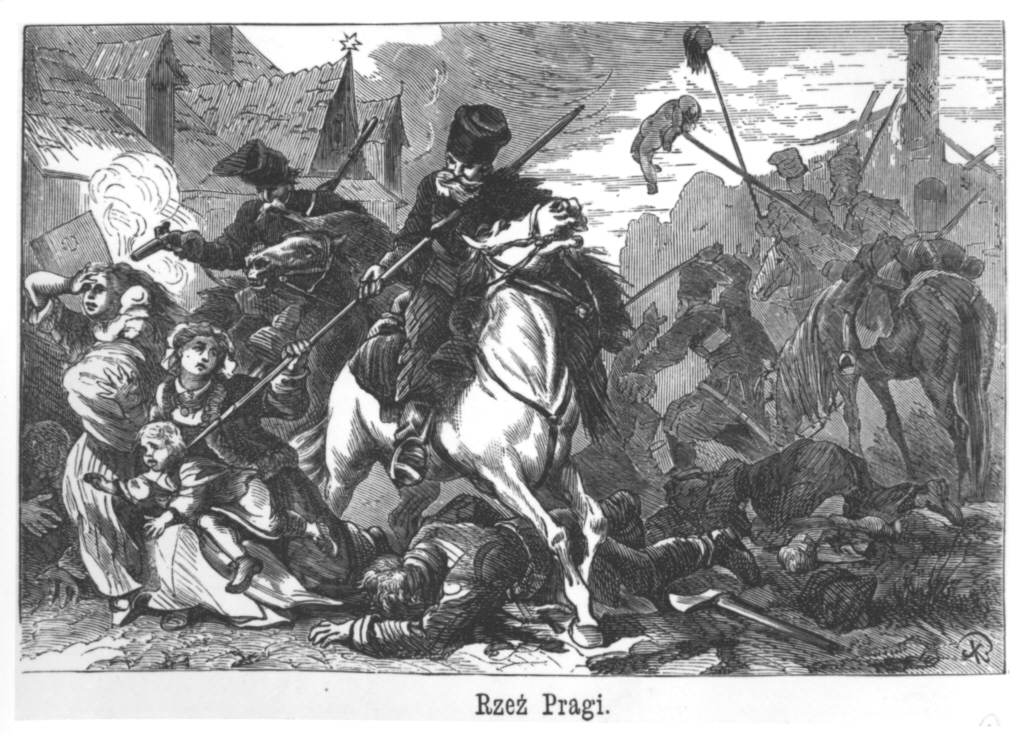
Rzeź Pragi (Slaughter of Praga), woodcut after Juliusz Kossak (19th century)

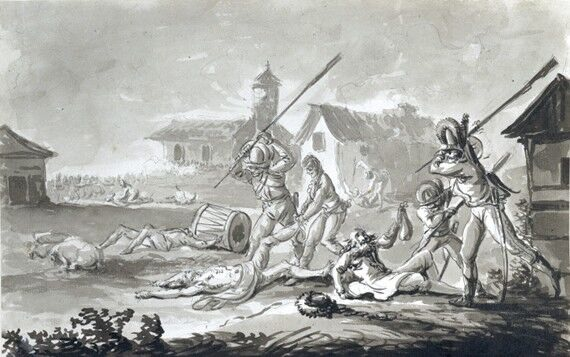
Epizod z rzezi Pragi (Slaughter of Praga episode) by Aleksander Orłowski, before 1832

After the battle ended, the Russian troops, against the orders given by Suvorov before the battle, started to smite, loot and, as mentioned, burn (Note: "The flames spread from the bridge to the nearest buildings and spread further; fires from the bombs of Warsaw's batteries also broke out in several other places. Praga turned into a sea of fire, the sight of which added to the horror of the Warsaw inhabitants.") the entire borough of Warsaw partly in revenge for the slaughter of the Russian Garrison in Warsaw during the Warsaw Uprising in April 1794, when about 2,000 Russian soldiers died (plus a similar number of captives), and partly because, since so many of the ordinary inhabitants were armed, it was not always easy to distinguish soldier from civilian. Although neither the disposition nor the order mentioned the booty, but this was the custom of the time, and Suvorov's military doctrine very clearly said: "If you take the camp — everything is yours, if you take the fortress — everything is yours". The looting went on all day and night, but the soldiers did not make much money from it, because there was almost nothing to loot. The Praga's Jewish population was characterised by poverty, and if anyone had anything more expensive, he got it out of the house beforehand,—especially the non-bulky property, which could be the only things of soldiers' use. Faddey Bulgarin recalled the words of General Ivan von Klugen, who took part in the Battle of Praga,

"We were being shot at from the windows of houses and the roofs, and our soldiers were breaking into the houses and killing all who happened to get in the way… In every living being our embittered soldiers saw the murderer of our men during the uprising in Warsaw… It cost a lot of effort for the Russian officers to save these poor people from the revenge of our soldiers… At four o'clock the terrible revenge for the slaughter of our men in Warsaw was complete!"

Almost all of the area was pillaged and inhabitants of the Praga district were tortured, raped and murdered. The exact death toll of that day remains unknown, but it is estimated that up to 20,000 people were killed, including military, armed and unarmed inhabitants. Suvorov himself wrote: "The whole of Praga was strewn with dead bodies, blood was flowing in streams." It was thought that unruly Cossack troops were partly to blame for the uncontrolled destruction. Russian historians (e.g., Boris Kipnis) state that Suvorov tried to stop the massacre by ordering the destruction of the bridge to Warsaw over the Vistula river with the purpose of preventing the spread of violence to the capital, although Polish historians dispute this, pointing out to purely military considerations of this move, such as to stop Polish and Lithuanian troops stationing on the left bank from attacking Russian soldiers. It is also known that Suvorov sent posters throughout the city, where residents were asked to take refuge in a Russian camp in order to avoid violence. Kipnis asserted that when Suvorov learned of the civilian bloodshed, he immediately rode to Praga, but when he received the news, it was too late—the blood of innocent had been spilled, and spilled a lot; nevertheless, Suvorov brought the soldiers to their senses and stopped the massacre.

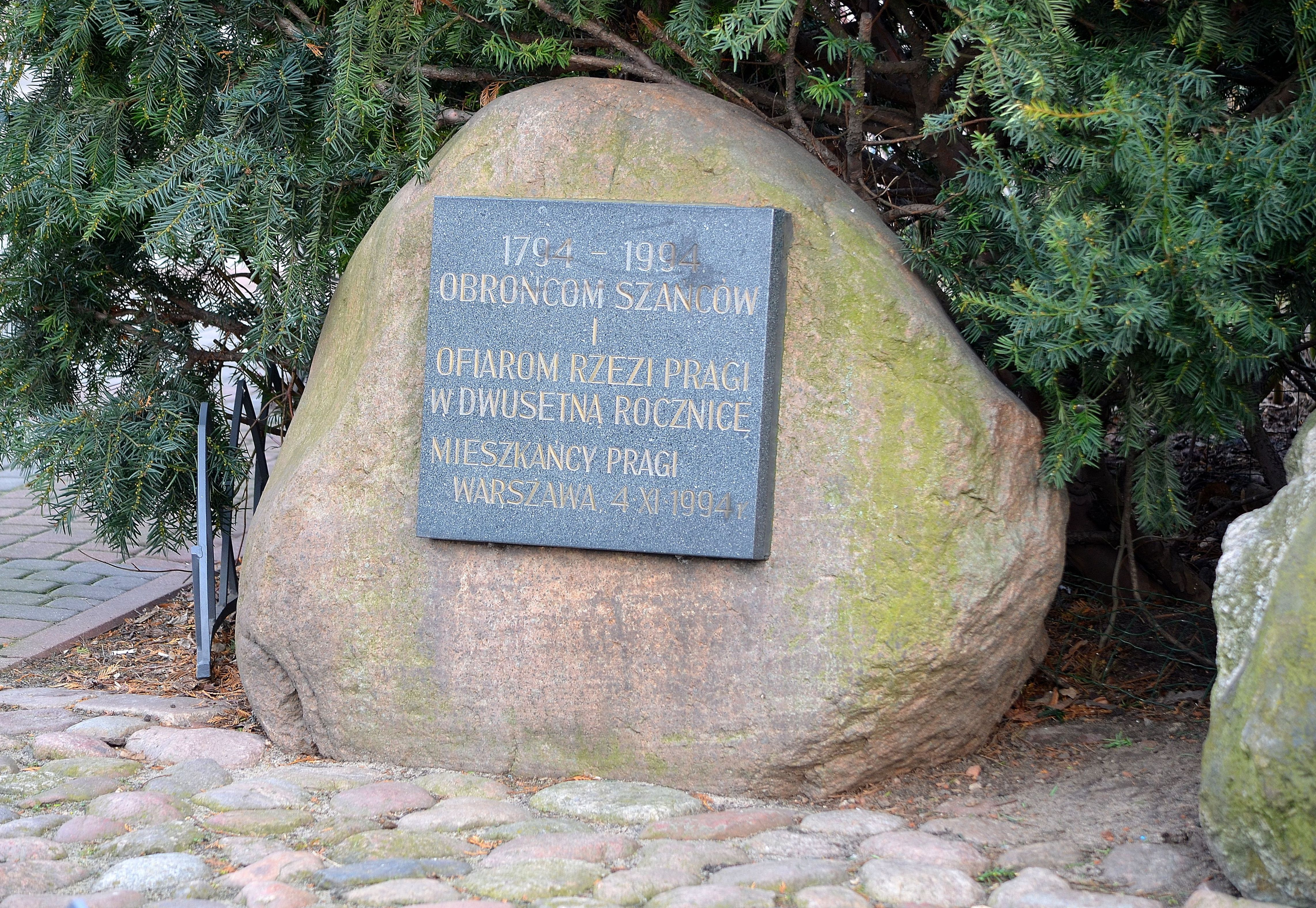
Stone commemorating the victims of the Massacre of Praga in front of St. Florian's Cathedral in Warsaw

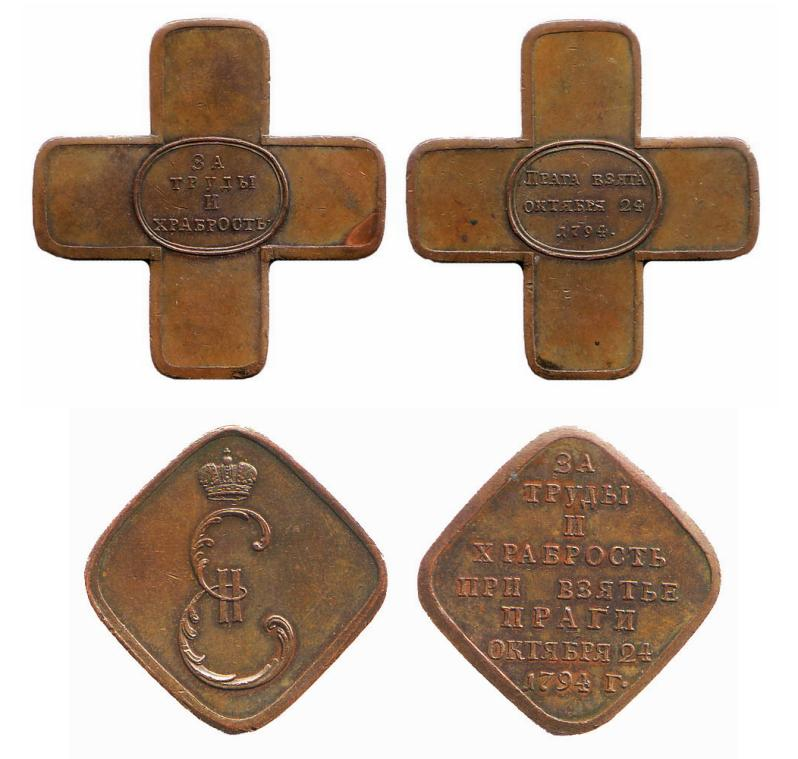
Copper replicas of Russian awards (new models) for the Battle of Praga: an officer's cross and a soldier's medal

== Aftermath ==
Russian casualties were 1,540 killed and wounded. Other estimates are 2,000 dead and wounded. Poland suffered losses of some 9,000 to 10,000 killed, wounded, and drowned, as well as 11,000 to 13,000 taken prisoner. According to additional estimates, the Poles suffered 8,000 killed and up to 14,680 captured. After the battle the commanders of Warsaw and large part of its inhabitants became demoralised. To spare Warsaw the fate of its eastern suburb, General Tomasz Wawrzecki decided to withdraw his remaining forces southwards and on November 5. Warsaw was captured by the Russians with little or no opposition. It is said that after the battle General Aleksandr Suvorov sent a report to Catherine the Great consisting of only four words: Hooray! Warsaw is ours! The Empress of Russia replied equally briefly: Bravo Fieldmarshal, Catherine, promoting him to Field Marshal for this victory. The massacre of Praga dented Suvorov and the Russian army's reputation throughout Europe.

== National historiographies ==
Russian writers and historians have tried to either justify or present this massacre as an revenge for Polish conquest of Moscow in 1610 or the heavy losses Russian garrison sustained during the Warsaw Uprising of 1794. Such reasoning was immortalized after 1831 when Russians once again crushed a Polish uprising (the November Uprising) against Russia's occupation of Poland; shortly afterward Alexander Pushkin compared the Praga massacre with the events of events of 1610: "Once, you celebrated the shame of Kreml, tsar's enslavement. But so did we crushed infants on Praga's ruins". Similar sentiments can be seen in the poetry of Vasily Zhukovsky and Gavrila Derzhavin or plays of Mikhail Kheraskov and Michail Glinka. On the other hand Polish literature and historiography has a tendency to be biased in the other direction, dwelling on the description of Russian cruelty and barbarism.

Similar arguments were used by Russian historians Pyotr Chaadayev, Anton Kozachenko and even Aleksandr Solzhenitsyn, and can be seen repeated in the Soviet-era reference works as the Great Soviet Encyclopedia. After the Second World War this entire event, like many other cases of Russo-Polish conflicts, was a taboo topic in the Soviet Bloc, where Soviet propaganda now tried to create an illusion of eternal Slavic unity and friendship. Any references to the massacre of Praga were eliminated from textbooks, existing academic references were restricted and censored, and further research was strongly discouraged. Although after the fall of communism the restrictions to research were lifted, this is still one of the controversial and sensitive topic in the Polish-Russian relations.

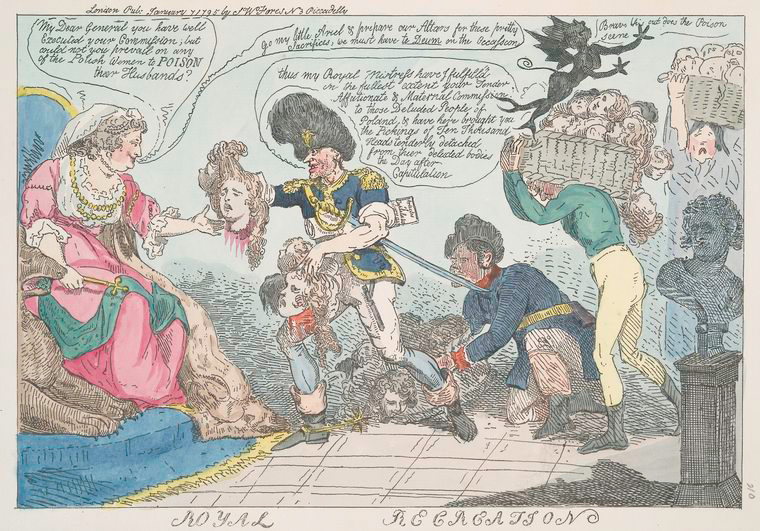
Massacre of Warsaw Praga, 1794, satirical illustration by Isaac Cruikshank

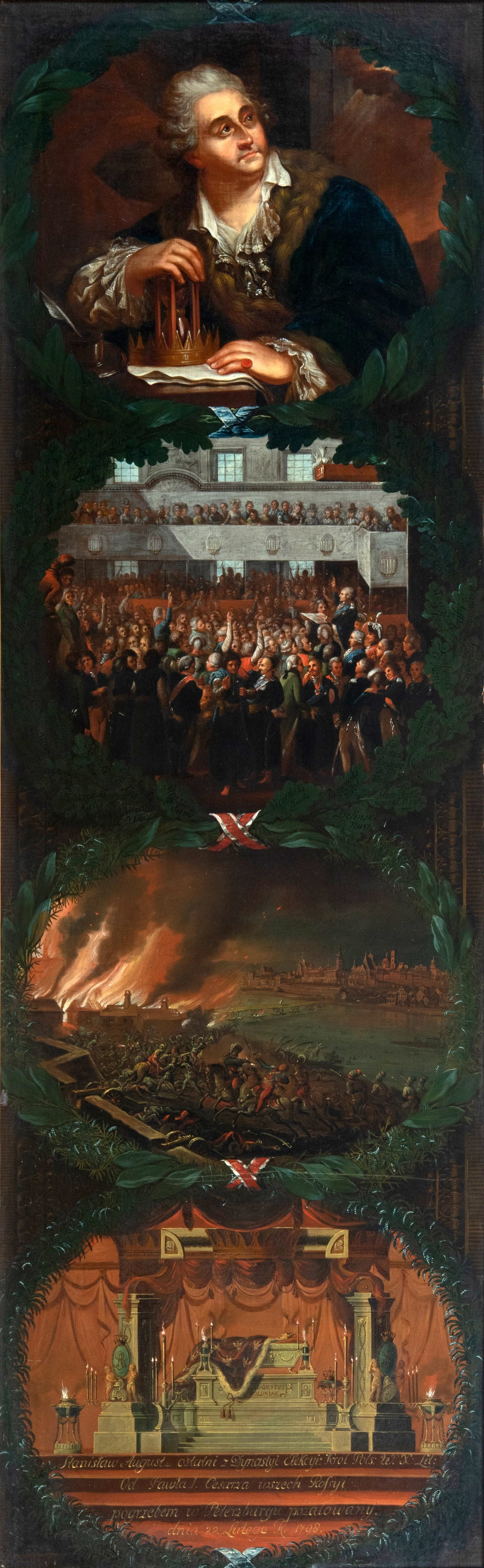
From top to bottom: Portrait of Stanisław August; The adoption of the Constitution of 3 May 1791; The battle of Praga; Stanisław August's catafalque in the Marble Palace

== See also ==
- Cross "For the Capture of Praga"
- List of massacres in Poland
- Siege of Izmail

== Notes and references ==
=== Sources ===
- Egorshina, O.; Petrova, A. (2023). История русской армии [The history of the Russian Army] (in Russian). Moscow: Edition of the Russian Imperial Library. ISBN 978-5-699-42397-2.
- Longworth, Philip (1966). The Art of Victory: The Life and Achievements of Field-Marshal Suvorov, 1729–1800. Holt, Rinehart and Winston.
- Anthing, Johann Friedrich (1813). History of the Campaigns of Count Alexander Suworow-Rymnikski. London: W. Green and T. Chaplin.
- Blease, Lyon (1920). Suvorof. London: Constable & Co Ltd.
- Orlov, Nikolay Aleksandrovich (1894). Штурм Праги Суворовым в 1794 году [The storming of Praga by Suvorov in 1794] (in Russian). St. Petersburg: Типография Штаба войск Гвардии и Петербургского военного округа. ISBN 978-5-4460-5018-5.
- Arsenyev, Konstantin; Petrushevsky, Fyodor (1898). Brockhaus and Efron Encyclopedic Dictionary (in Russian). Vol. XXIVa: "Полярные сияния — Прая". Friedrich A. Brockhaus (Leipzig), Ilya A. Efron (St. Petersburg). p. 934.
- "Obrona Pragi (2–4 listopada 1794)". TwojaHistoria.pl (in Polish).
