= Ivan Fersen =

Russian military commander

Graf Ivan Yevstafyevich Fersen
- Иванъ Евстафьевичъ Ферзенъ (Note: Pre-1918 Russian orthography)
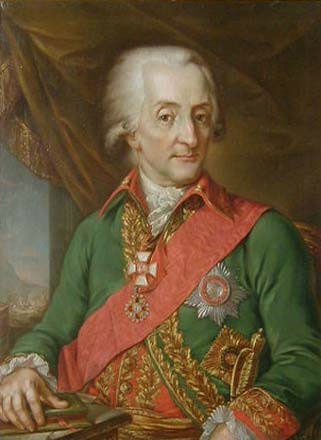
- Fersen by Andrey Zhdanov (1775–1811), 1795
- Born: 1747
- Died: Early 1799
- Other name: Hans Heinrich von Fersen
- Relatives: Fersen family
- Military career
- Allegiance: Russia
- Branch: Imperial Russian Army
- Service years: 1760–1798
- Rank: General of the Infantry
- Conflicts: Russo-Turkish War; Siege of Khotin; Battle of Larga; Siege of Silistria; Russo-Swedish War; Battle of Vyborg Bay; Polish–Russian War of 1792; Battle of Brest; Kościuszko Uprising; Battle of Gołków; Battle of Maciejowice; Battle of Kobyłka; Battle of Praga
- Awards: Order of Saint George; Order of Saint Alexander Nevsky

Baron, Graf (Note: since 1793) Hans Heinrich von (Note: In German personal names, von is a preposition which approximately means 'of' or 'from' and usually denotes some sort of nobility. While von (always lower case) is part of the family name or territorial designation, not a first or middle name, if the noble is referred to by their last name, use Schiller, Clausewitz or Goethe, not von Schiller, etc.) Fersen or Ivan Yevstafyevich Fersen (Russian: Ива́н Евста́фьевич Фе́рзен, romanized: Ivan Yevstaf'yevič Ferzen) was a Russian military commander and general of the infantry from the nobility of what was then Russia's Livonia. As a lieutenant colonel, he fought in the 1769–74 Russo-Turkish War. In 1790 he acted in Finland against the Swedes, where he assisted Vasily Chichagov's ships in the Bay of Vyborg with the fire of coastal artillery batteries, increasing the confusion of the Swedish warships in the bay. He also fought in the Polish–Russian War of 1792 and the Kościuszko Uprising.

In 1792, in the aftermath of the adoption of the constitution of 3 May 1791 he formed in Lithuania a general confederation (after the example of Targowica), which was enacted under the patronage of Empress Catherine II, and thus quickly pacified the whole region. Fersen gained notoriety with the defeat and capture of Kościuszko in the battle of Maciejowice. Then he took part in the capture of Praga by Suvorov. In 1797 he was appointed director of the First Cadet Corps; he soon retired and died in his Livonian estate.

== Sources ==
- Arsenyev, Konstantin; Petrushevsky, Fyodor (1902). Brockhaus and Efron Encyclopedic Dictionary (in Russian). Vol. 70: Фенолы – Финляндия. Friedrich A. Brockhaus (Leipzig), Ilya A. Efron (Saint Petersburg). pp. 582–583.
- Polovtsov, Alexander (1901). Russian Biographical Dictionary. Vol. 21: Фабер – Цявловский. St. Petersburg: Типография В. Безобразова и К^{о}. pp. 51–52.
