= Węgrzynowice =

- Village
- Location within Poland
- Coordinates: 51°42′N 19°58′E
- Country: Poland
- Voivodeship: Łódź
- County: Tomaszów
- Gmina: Budziszewice

Węgrzynowice [vɛŋɡʐɨnɔˈvit͡sɛ] is a village in the administrative district of Gmina Budziszewice, within Tomaszów County, Łódź Voivodeship, in central Poland.

Węgrzynowice is famous as the birthplace of 17th-century szlachta soldier and writer Jan Chryzostom Pasek, who is said to have written his memoirs there. The place where his manor once stood is now occupied by an 18th-century wooden manor, surrounded by a romantic park.
