= Samuel Maskiewicz =

Polish-Lithuanian officer

- Born: July 17, 1580; Serwecz, Nowogródek powiat, Nowogródek Voivodeship, Grand Duchy of Lithuania, Polish–Lithuanian Commonwealth
- Died: 1642
- Occupation: Writer
- Notable work: Pamiętniki Samuela Maskiewicza

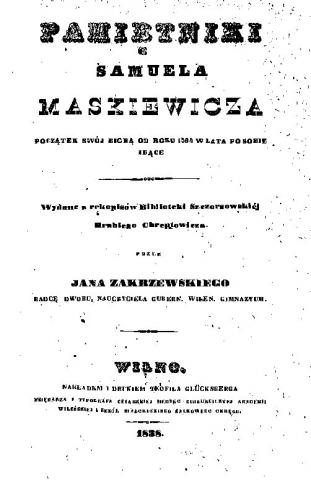
The main page of "Diaries" by Samuel Maskiewicz. Wilno. 1838

Samuel Maskiewicz (circa 1580, Serwecz, Nowogródek powiat – after 1632) was a Polish-Lithuanian officer, Hussar of the Grand Duchy of Lithuania, a participant in the Moscow Campaign, writer–memoirist, author of a diary published in Russia.

== Biography ==
He was born in a family that bore the Odrowąż coat of arms. By religion – a Calvinist. He owned the village of Serwecz (now Servach, Karelichy District, Grodno Region, Belarus).

In 1601, as part of the Gabriel Voyna Regiment, he fought against the Swedes in Livonia.

Later he was at the court of Adam Wiśniowiecki in Bragin.

Then he served in Podolye, fought against the Sandomierz Confederation.

In 1609, with the army of King Sigismund III Vasa, he set out on a campaign against Smolensk, spent eight months near Smolensk.

Then the royal regiment of Prince Janusz Porycki, in which Maskiewicz served, joined the army of the full crown hetman Stanisław Żółkiewski and took part in the victorious Battle of Klushino (June 24, 1610).

In 1610–1611, he was with Hetman Aleksander Korwin Gosiewski in the Moscow Kremlin, fought with the militia of Lyapunov and Trubetskoy.

From 1615, he served with the Kletsk Ordinate, Upyte Headman Jan Albert Radziwiłł (1591–1626); then at Prince Mikołaj Krzysztof "the Orphan" Radziwiłł.

In 1617–1618, he was elected ambassador (deputy) of the Main Tribunal of the Grand Duchy of Lithuania from Nowogródek powiat.

Since 1628 – Nowogródek Zemstvo clerk.

Became a supporter of the Sapieha princes. With their help, he was appointed Novogrudok Podvoyevoda (after 1632–1638?).

At the end of his life, he built a Uniate church in the village of Servech.

== Significance ==
Author of one of the first Polish–language monuments of memoir literature on the territory of Belarus.

In 1625–1631, he kept a diary (Diariusz) depicting events from 1594 to 1621, including the Time of Troubles in Russia, the accession of False Dmitry I, the Russian–Polish War (1609–1618) and the Polish–Ottoman War (1620–1621), as well as the Battle of Tsetsora.

Maskiewicz's diaries describe in detail the Siege of Smolensk (1609–1611), while emphasizing the courage of the city's defenders, especially its governor Mikhail Shein. The actions of the commanders of the Commonwealth, including Stanisław Żółkiewski, were critically assessed; a significant place in the work is occupied by a description of the life of the Moscow boyars, their opinions about the Polish gentry liberties, as gentry willfulness, are positively evaluated. The author justifies the harsh reaction of the Russian peasantry against the troops of the Commonwealth, as revenge for the disasters it inflicted on the people.

He also owns the notes placed, in Russian translation, in the collection of Nikolai Ustryalov "Legends of Contemporaries About Dmitry the Pretender".

Maskiewicz did not touch on the issues of big politics in the Diaries. In addition to military and political events, he described in his diary a comparison of Polish and Russian culture.

The diary is written in the style of gawęda szlachecka ("noble storytelling").

== Family ==
Father – Jan Semenowicz Maskiewicz (died 1595) – owned part of the Serwecz and Yatra estates, served with Troky Castellan Ostafi Bohdanowicz Wołłowicz.

Older brothers: Jan Maskiewicz, Pinsk subiudex, Gabriel Maskiewicz and Daniel Maskiewicz. Younger brother Samuel Maskiewicz.

The son was a memoirist Boguslav Kazimir Maskevich (1625–1683).

== Bibliography ==
- Maskevich's Diary (1594–1621) // Legends of Contemporaries About Dmitry the Pretender – Volume 1 – Saint Petersburg, 1859
- Pamiętniki Samuela i Bogusława Kazimierza Maskiewiczów – Wrocław, 1961
- Diaries of the 17th Century (1594–1707): Samuel Maskevich, Boguslav Maskevich, Philip Obukhovich, Michal Obukhovich, Teodor Obukhovich / National Academy of Sciences of Belarus, Center for Studies of Belarusian Culture, Language and Literature, Yanka Kupala Institute of Literary Studies – Minsk, 2016
- From the Diaries of Samuel Maskevich

== Sources ==
- History of Belarusian Pre–October Literature – Minsk, 1977 – Pages 215–216
- Grand Duchy of Lithuania: Encyclopedia. In 2 Volumes. Volume 2: Cadet Corps – Yatskevich / Editorial Board: Gennady Pashkov (Editor In Chief) And Others – Minsk: Belarusian Encyclopedia, 2006 – Page 278
- Nikolai Ulashchik. Memoirs and Diaries as Sources on the History of Belarus: From the Manuscript Heritage / Contributors: Ya. M. Kiselyova, V. U. Scalaban – Minsk: Peito, 2000 – 86 Pages
