= Battle of Kobyłka =

Battle of the Kościuszko Uprising

- Part of the Kościuszko Uprising
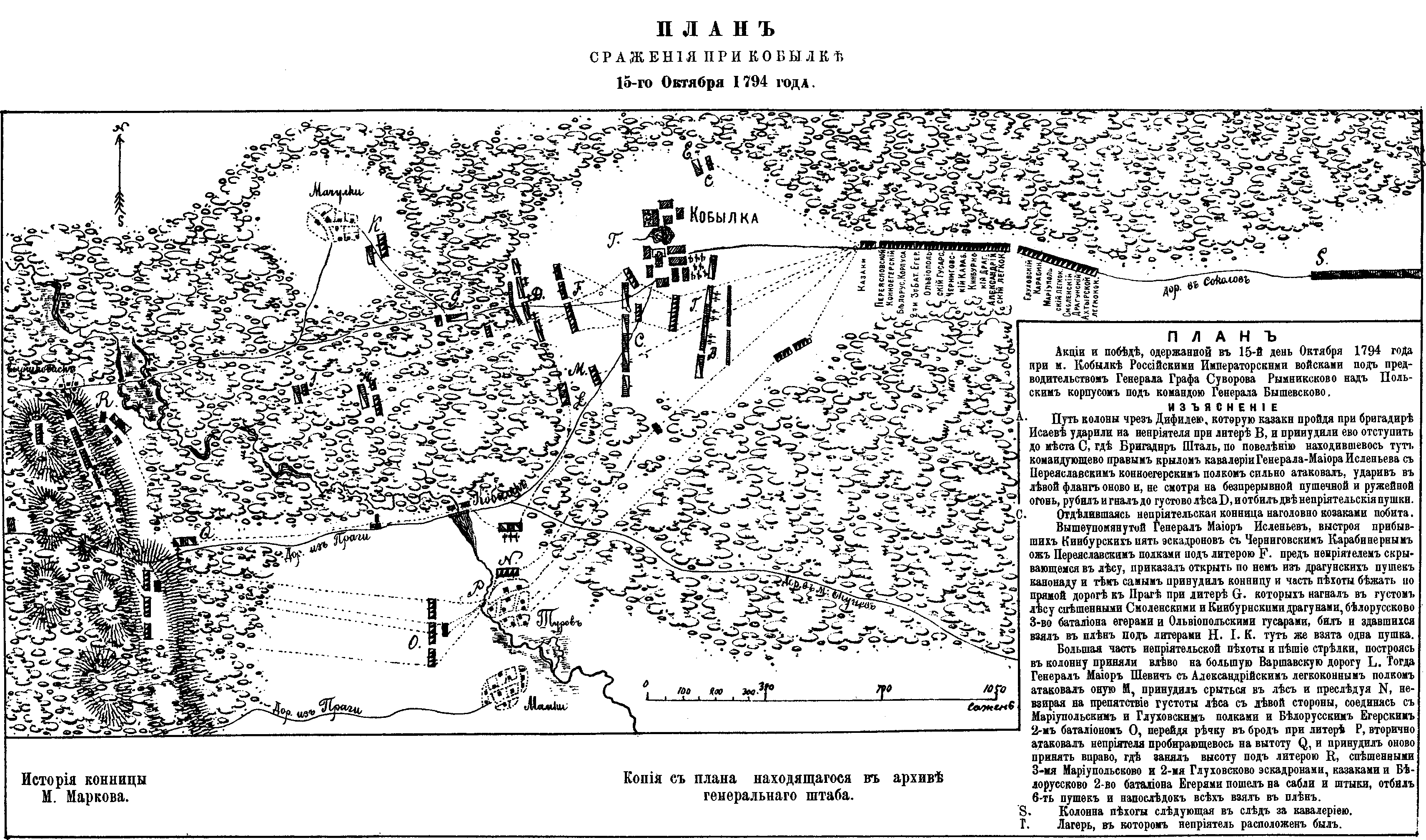
- Schematic of the Battle of Kobyłka; The history of the cavalry by M. Markov
Date	October 26, 1794 (15th OS)
Location	Kobyłka, Masovian Voivodeship
Result	Russian victory

Belligerents
(Russian Empire) Russia	Poland–Lithuania

Commanders and leaders
Alexander Suvorov Ivan Fersen	Stanisław Mokronowski; Jan Meyen; Arnold Byszewski (POW); Col. Wolan (POW)

Strength
Up to 4,000 (Note: 3–4,000 engaged; 10–11,000 total, with 20 cannons)	Formally under Meyen's command: Byszewski: 2,500; Wolan: 1,000 (Note: >4,000 total — up to 4,500 (according to Russian data); corps; 2,500 men and 5 cannons of Byszewski's own column involved, plus another 1,000 men of Colonel Wolan's column. Polish insurgent forces at Kobylka were 5,560 men and 9 cannons according to Polish data.)

Casualties and losses
153 killed and wounded (Note: Perhaps "a bit of an understatement".)	450 dead and 846 captured acc. to Polish source Almost all of Meyen's unit acc. to Russian source (incl. 1,073 prisoners of war, 9 cannons & 1 standard)

The Battle of Kobyłka (Note: Russian: Бой у Кобылки, Polish: Bitwa pod Kobyłką) took place between the Russian Empire's armed forces under the leadership of Suvorov and Polish-Lithuanian insurgents under Stanisław Mokronowski north-east of Warsaw (at Kobyłka), on 26 October 1794. It was part of the Kościuszko Uprising and ended with the insurgents' defeat. Having set up camp near Kobyłka after the battle, Suvorov began preparing for the upcoming Battle of Praga.

== Battle ==
When Suvorov received information from Stanisławów that the insurgent detachments were at Kobyłka and Okuniew, he immediately sent General Fersen's cavalry to Okuniew, and himself with 10,000 moved to Kobyłka.

Polish forces of Mokronowski's column were under General Meyen's command, but Meyen left his detachment at the very beginning and go to Warsaw; the Poles remained under the command of General Byszewski, adjutant-general of the Polish king.

Russian General Georgy Ivanovich Shevich forced the Polish column to retreat in two separate sub-columns, which both laid down their arms; one of them, Colonel Wolan's, followed the forest road (the right flank; it surrendered first), and the other, Byszewski's own, the great road to Warsaw. Particularly noteworthy on the Russian side was the saber strike from the dismounted light cavalry and carabineers; Suvorov later said to a French emigrant who had joined the Russian service: "If you were at Kobyłka, you would see things I have never seen either". Fersen, on the other hand, found no Poles in Okuniew, however, he sent to Suvorov 2 Cossack cavalry regiments in support, who took part in a flanking manoeuvre against Wolan. This battle is also notable for being won by the Russians almost exclusively by cavalry, with the exception of one jaeger battalion.

In this battle, captured Polish officers asked Suvorov to feed them, as being in constant and hurried movement for several days, they were always hungry. Suvorov ordered to feed them as well as the captive soldiers with anything possible, which was performed by the Pereyaslav Horse-Jaeger Regiment, and the soldiers willingly shared with the prisoners of the meagre stock, which they had with them.

== Sources ==
- Markov, M. (1890). История конницы. Часть 4-я. От Фридриха Великого до введения нарезного оружия. Отдел I [The history of the cavalry. Part 4. From Frederick the Great to the introduction of rifled weapons. Section 1]. Tver: Типо-Литография Ф. С. Муравьёва.
- Petrushevsky, Alexander (1884). Generalissimo Prince Suvorov (in Russian). Vol. 2 (1st ed.). St. Petersburg: Типография М. М. Стасюлевича.
- Orlov, Nikolay Aleksandrovich (1894). Штурм Праги Суворовым в 1794 году [The storming of Praga by Suvorov in 1794]. St. Petersburg: Типография Штаба войск Гвардии и Петербургского военного округа. ISBN 978-5-4460-5018-5.
- Velichko, Konstantin I.; Novitsky, Vasily F.; Schwarz, Alexey V. von; Apushkin, Vladimir A.; Schoultz, Gustav K. von (1913). Военная энциклопедия Сытина [Sytin Military Encyclopedia] (in Russian). Vol. 13. Кобленц – Круз. Moscow: Типография Т-ва И. Д. Сытина. p. 4.
- Bujalski, Mirosław (2004). "Ostatnia bitwa Powstania Kościuszkowskiego". Niedziela (in Polish). 43/2004.
