= Pasek =

Pasek is a surname. Notable people with the surname include:

- Andrzej Pasek, Polish 52nd place in Mixed individual eventing, 2004 Summer Olympics
- Benj Pasek, half of the Pasek and Paul writing team, youngest winners of the Jonathan Larson Performing Arts Foundation award
- Bret Pasek, world's fastest fire eater. Broke Guinness World Records most fire torches extinguished in one minute with the mouth on Sept. 7, 2014 with 99 consumed.
- Dušan Pašek (ice hockey, born 1985) (1985-2021), Slovak ice hockey player
- Jan Chryzostom Pasek, 17th century Polish nobleman and writer.
- Justine Pasek, Miss Panama 2001, Crowned Miss Universe 2002, Becoming the first and so far only Panamanian to win the title
