= Cross "For the Capture of Praga" =

18th c. military decoration awarded by the Russian Empire during the Kościuszko Uprising

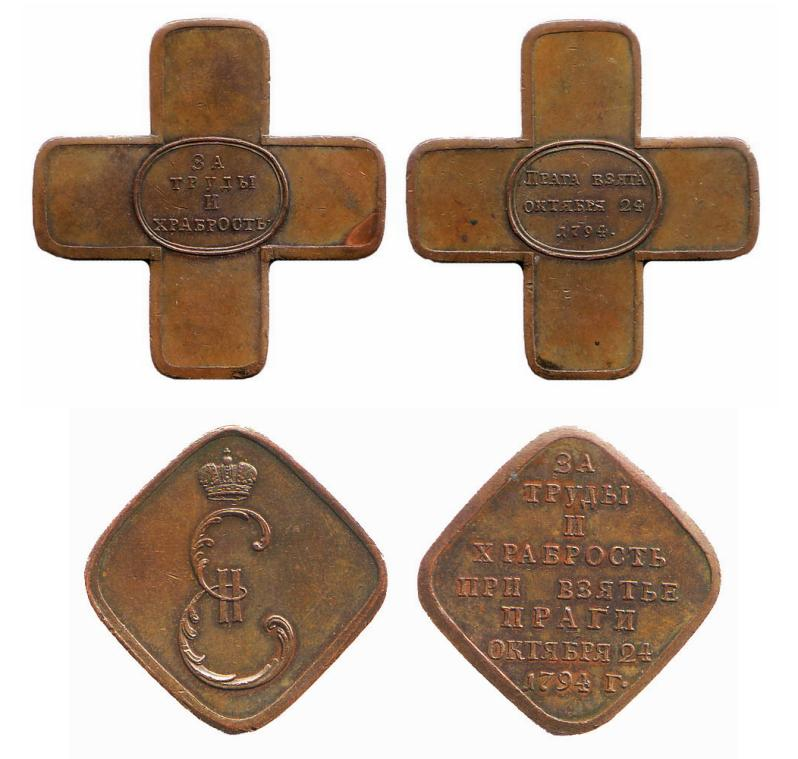
- Cross "For the Capture of Praga"
- Type: Service medal
- Presented by: Russian Empire
- Status: No longer awarded
- Established: January 13, 1795
- Ribbon of the Cross "For the Capture of Praga"

The Cross "For the Capture of Praga" (also known as the Cross "For the Capture of Warsaw") was a Russian award, established by Empress Catherine the Great to recognise participants in the Battle of Praga, a suburb of Warsaw, during the Kościuszko Uprising.

== History ==
Many officers who participated in the Battle of Praga were awarded the orders of St. George and St. Vladimir; those who did not receive them were awarded gold crosses with the inscription: "For Labor and Courage". On the reverse side of the cross was the inscription: "Praga is taken on October 24, 1794". The award was worn on the ribbon of Saint George. The receipt of the gold cross by an officer gave the right to a supplement to his length of service of three years.

A silver rhomboid medal with the inscription "For Labor and Courage in the Taking of Praga on October 24, 1794" on the red ribbon of the Order of Saint Alexander Nevsky was intended for the lower ranks. On the obverse of the medal is the monogram of Catherine II. An imperial decree of January 1, 1795 stated that the award was intended for those "who in this battle acted courageously, and for others, who during the actions of our weapons to tame the insurrection in Poland, participated in different battles". The right to receive the medal was not restricted to soldiers who were direct participants in the Battle of Praga, but also for soldiers who took part in hostilities in other parts of Poland.

== See also ==
- Medal "For the Liberation of Warsaw"
