= Leon Bazyli Sapieha =

Polish–Lithuanian politician (1652–1686)

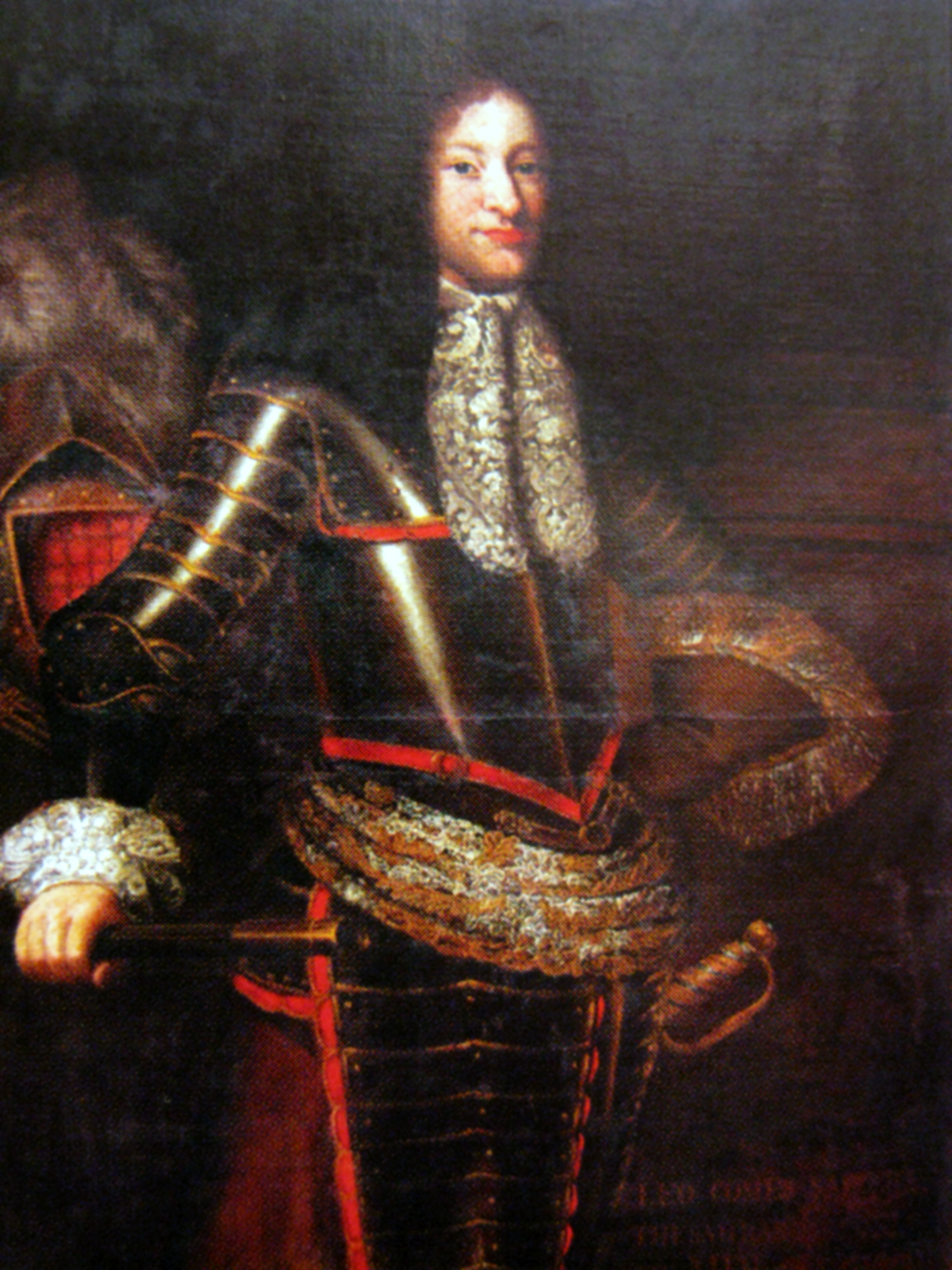

Personal details
- Born: 20 March 1652 Polish–Lithuanian Commonwealth
- Died: 9 November 1686 (aged 34) Warsaw, Polish–Lithuanian Commonwealth
- Parent: Paweł Jan Sapieha (father)
- Education: Vilnius University
- Occupation: Politician, Lithuanian Army General

Leon Bazyli Sapieha (Polish pronunciation: [ˈlɛɔn baˈzɨli saˈpjɛxa]; 20 March 1652 – 9 November 1686) was a Polish-Lithuanian politician. He was the treasurer of the Lithuanian court and Lithuanian army general and member of the noble Sapieha family. He was the son of Paweł Jan Sapieha and brother to Jan Kazimierz Sapieha the Younger, amongst many other siblings.

In the years 1663–1668 he studied at the University of Wilno, then for several years traveled around Europe, including a visit to Paris. He returned to the country about 1673. He was an envoy to the Diet of Grodno in 1678. He was an envoy to the sejm in 1681, where he was appointed treasurer of the court. He was also a Sejm delegate in 1683.

Sapieha took part in the Polish relief expedition to Vienna in 1683, under King Jan Sobieski. In 1684 he was appointed general of the Lithuanian army and in 1683 he participated in the campaign against Ottoman Turkey.

Sapieha died in Warsaw on 9 November 1686 as a result of an accidental firing of a gun. After his death, a notable sepulchral monument of Sapieha was made around 1687, an original composition in the style of the great works by Bernini.
