= Jan Jerzy Giessler =

Polish military officer

Jan Jerzy Giessler of Złotorzek (his surname also rendered as Gizler, Giesler or Gisiler; late 18th century) was a Polish military officer.

Born to Johann Giessler, an Austrian officer in Polish military service, Jan Jerzy Giessler also joined the Polish Army, eventually rising to the rank of Colonel of the Polish Army. He was also ennobled and received the coat of arms of Złotorzek.

He was the commanding officer of the 16th Regiment of Foot during the Kościuszko Uprising. He distinguished himself during the Warsaw Insurrection of 1794, for which he was promoted to the rank of Major General and his unit, initially battalion-sized, was expanded to full regiment. He was taken prisoner by the Russians during the Battle of Praga.
