= Jan Hieronim Chodkiewicz =

Polish nobleman (died 1621)

Nowogródek Voivodeship representative at the 1616 sejm
- In office 1616–1616

Lithuanian Great Deputy Master of the Pantry
- In office 1621–1621

Personal details
- Died: 12 September 1621
- Spouse: Krystyna Sapieżanka

Jan Hieronim Chodkiewicz (Note: Lithunanian: Jonas Jeronimas Chodkevičius; Belarusian: Ян Геранім Хадкевіч) (died 12 September 1621) was a Polish nobleman of the Chodkiewicz family, that served as in 1621 as Lithuanian Great Deputy Master of the Pantry in Polish–Lithuanian Commonwealth. He was a member of parliament that represented Nowogródek Voivodeship during the 1616 sejm meeting. He was married to Krystyna Sapieżanka.

== Bibliography ==
- Urzędnicy centralni i dygnitarze Wielkiego Księstwa Litewskiego XIV-XVIII wieku. Spisy by Henryk Lulewicz and Andrzej Rachuba. Kórnik 1994, p. 203.
- Przedsejmowy sejmik nowogrodzki w latach 1607-1648 by Henryk Wisner in Przegląd Historyczny, vol. 69, number 4 (1978). p. 690.
