= Battle of Maciejowice =

Battle of the Kościuszko Uprising

Coordinates: 51.70624°N 21.60479°E

- Part of the Kościuszko Uprising
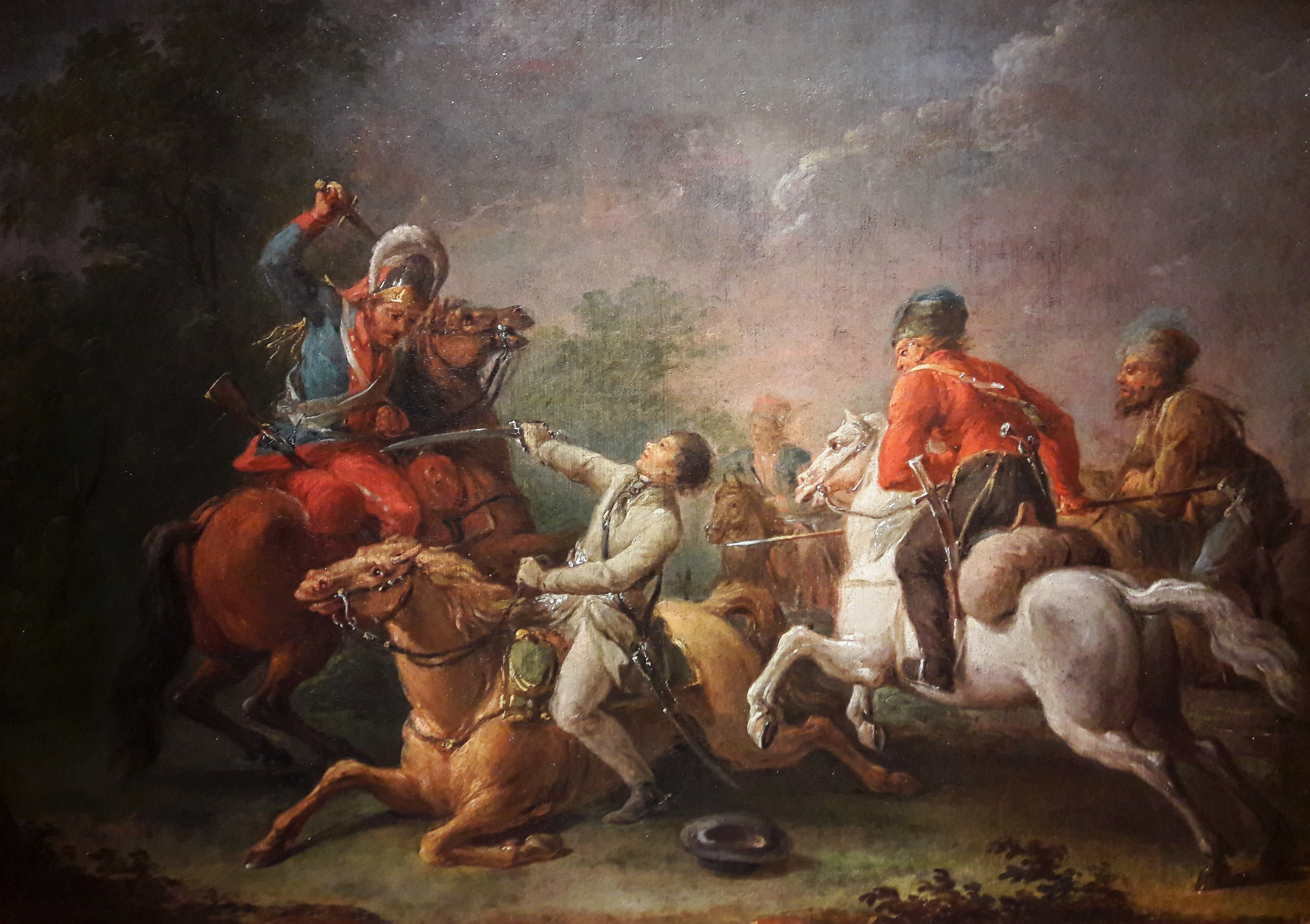
- Kościuszko's capture in battle, by Jan Bogumił Plersch
Date	10 October 1794
Location	Maciejowice
Result	Russian victory

Belligerents
Poland-Lithuania	(Russia) Russian Empire

Commanders and leaders
Tadeusz Kościuszko (POW)	(Russia) Ivan Fersen (Russia) Fyodor Denisov

Strength
7,000	14,000

Casualties and losses
4,000 killed, wounded and captured	2,000 – 2,500

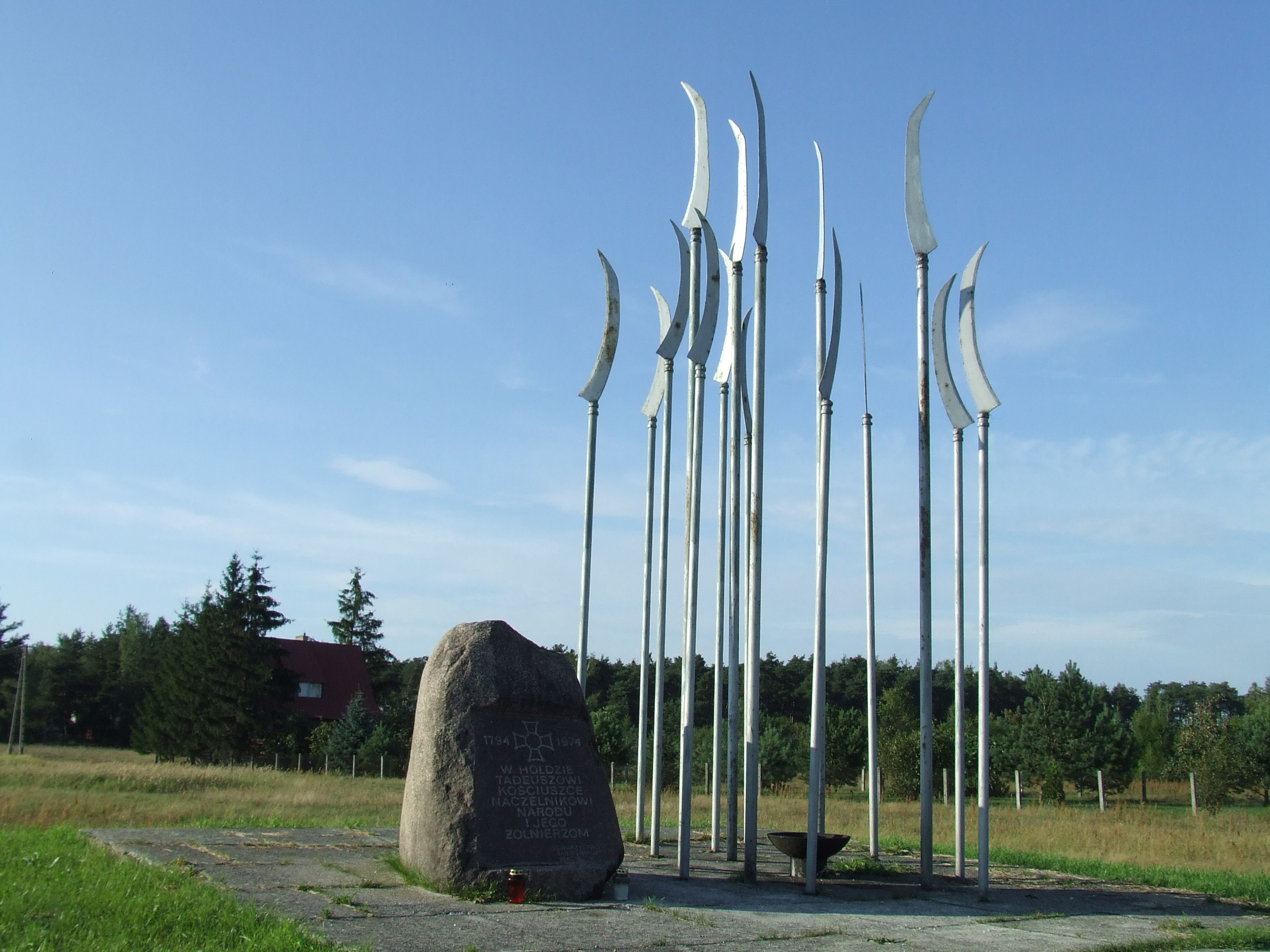
A memorial of the battle near Podzamcze

The Battle of Maciejowice was fought on 10 October 1794, between the Polish-Lithuanian Commonwealth and the Russian Empire during the Polish Uprising of 1794.

The Poles were led by Tadeusz Kościuszko. Kościuszko with 6,200 men, who planned to prevent the linking of three larger Russian corps, commanded by generals Fyodor Denisov, Ivan Fersen and Alexander Suvorov. He also had requested the support of Adam Poniński (who had 4,000 soldiers), but Poniński failed to arrive on the battlefield in time.

== Battle ==
Kościuszko had spent the night in an abandoned manor house of the Zamoyskis with his army in the field in front flanked by woods, and a river behind the house. Denisov and then Fersen attacked the next morning, and the Poles burned the village on their left flank to prevent it being used as cover. Initially, the Russian advance was slowed by the mud, but after three hours the Poles ran out of ammunition for their cannons. The Russian infantry then made a bayonet charge and slaughtered the Poles for the next three hours.

After three horses were shot from under him, Kościuszko finally tried leaving the battlefield, but his horse tripped. A Cossack stabbed him with a pike from behind, followed by a second Cossack who stabbed him in the left hip. Attempting to take his own life, Kościuszko found his pistol empty, and then passed out in the mud, but was not identified as the Polish commanding general. He was stripped by two unknown horsemen, but then saved and carried away from the battlefield by Denisov's Cossacks and later taken prisoner.

== Aftermath ==
Kościuszko was taken to St. Petersburg by General Alexei Khrushchev and two thousand Russian soldiers. The news of the fall of Warsaw reached him on 17 November.

The Battle of Maciejowice is commemorated on the Tomb of the Unknown Soldier, Warsaw, with the inscription "MACIEJOWICE 10 X 1794”.
