= Aleksander Orłowski =

Russian painter (1777–1832)

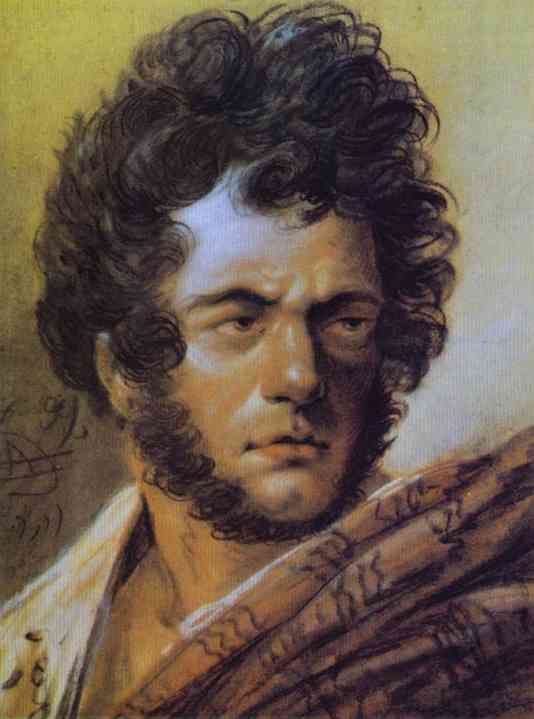
- Self-portrait
- Born: 9 March 1777; Warsaw, Polish–Lithuanian Commonwealth
- Died: 13 March 1832 (aged 55); Saint Petersburg, Russia
- Occupation: Painter
- Elected: Member Academy of Arts (1809)

Aleksander Orłowski (9 March 1777 – 13 March 1832) was a Polish painter and sketch artist, and a pioneer of lithography in the Russian Empire.

== Life ==
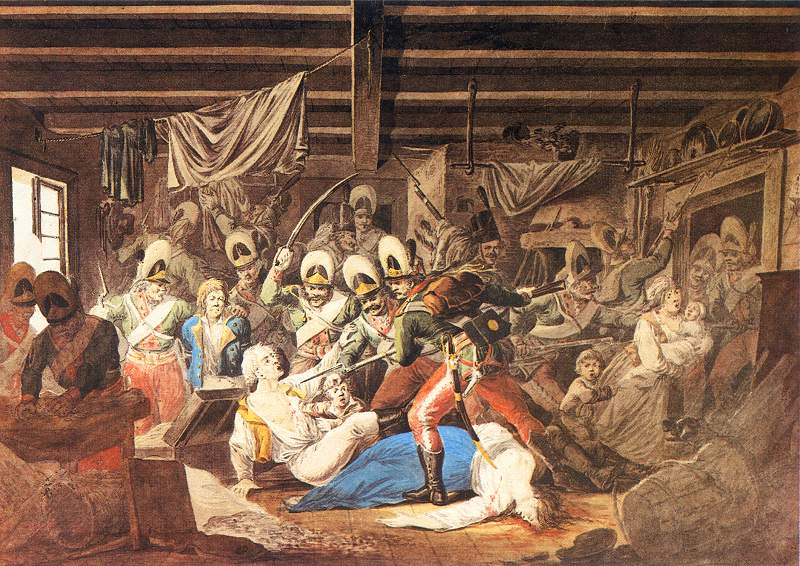
The Massacre of Praga

Orłowski was born in 1777 in Warsaw into an impoverished noble family, his father was a tavern-keeper. In early childhood he became known as a prodigy, and soon Izabela Czartoryska financed his first painting classes with the artist Jan Piotr Norblin. In 1793 Orłowski joined the Polish Army and fought in the Kościuszko Uprising against Imperial Russia and Prussia; he was wounded and returned to Warsaw for further studies, financed by Prince Józef Poniatowski. He studied with many notable painters of the age, including Norblin, Marcello Bacciarelli and Wincenty Lesserowicz.

In 1802, after the Partitions of Poland, he moved to Saint Petersburg, where he became a pioneer of lithography. He died there, aged fifty-five.

His works include countless sketches of everyday life in Poland and Russia, and scenes from the Kościuszko Uprising and other Polish wars.

Aleksander Orłowski is mentioned in Pan Tadeusz, a poem written by Adam Mickiewicz in 1834, as well as in Alexander Pushkin's works.

== Sources ==
- "Орловский, Александр Осипович" . Brockhaus and Efron Encyclopedic Dictionary (in Russian). 1906.
- Bogusław Mucha, Artyści polscy w nowożytnej Rosji, Łódź 1994, ISBN 83-7016-738-1
- Ludwik Bazylow, Polacy w Petersburgu, Wrocław 1984, ISBN 83-04-01567-6
- "Aleksander Orłowski" from Tygodnik Ilustrowany #34 (19 May 1860) @ Polona
