= Aleksander Krzysztof Naruszewicz =

Polish nobleman

Aleksander Krzysztof Naruszewicz (d. 21 June 1680 in Warsaw) was a Polish nobleman and a Deputy Chancellor of Lithuania since 1658.

He was son of Krzysztof Naruszewicz and Elżbieta Szymkowicz. Aleksander Krzysztof had three older brothers: Stanisław, Jan, and Kazimierz. On April 21, 1631, he enrolled at the University of Ingolstadt. Later he studied at the University of Bologna and at the University of Padua.

Before September 1646 Aleksander Krzysztof Naruszewicz became starost of Lida.
