= Paweł Jan Sapieha =

Polish–Lithuanian nobleman (1609–1665)

- Grand Hetman of Lithuania
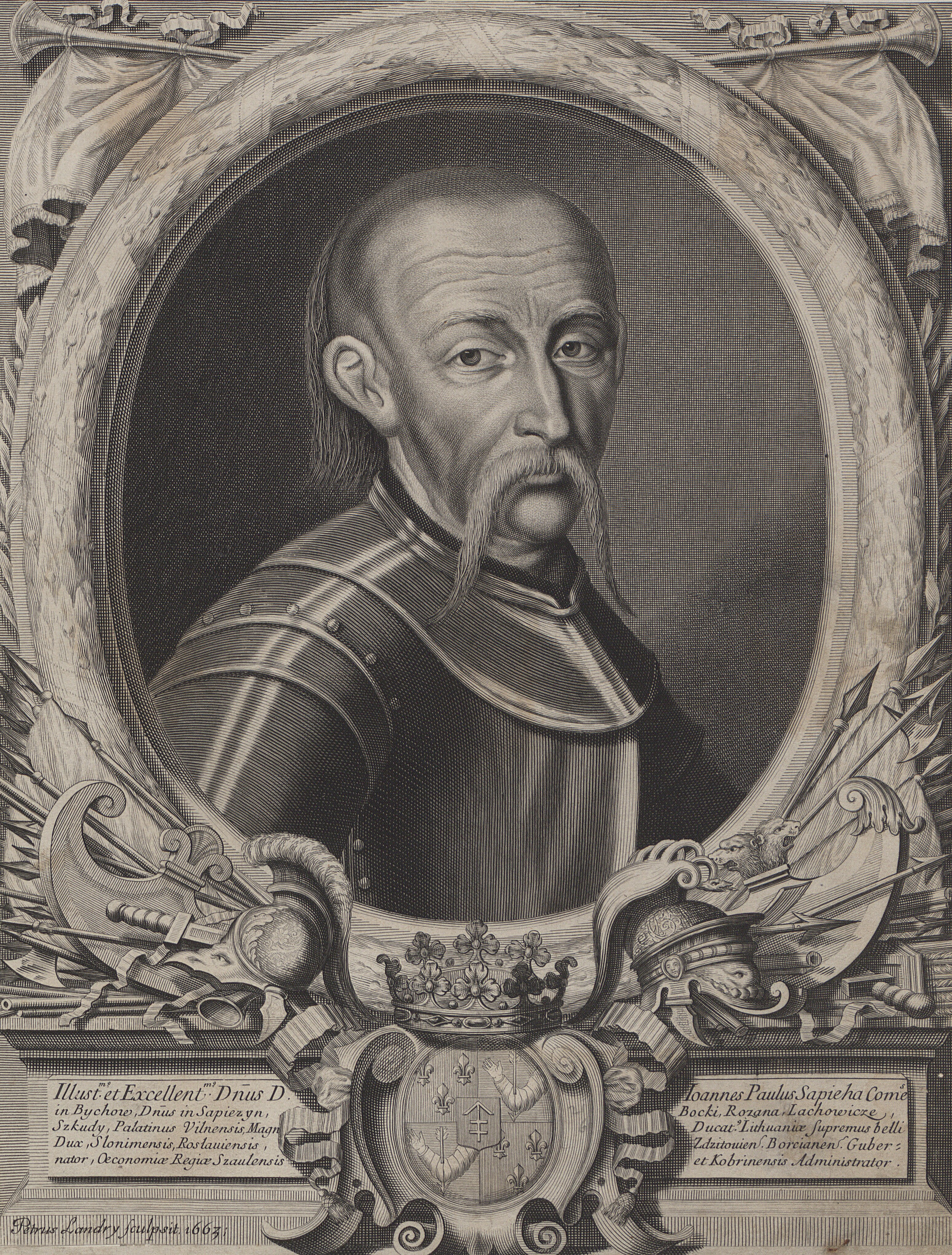
- Coat of arms: Lis
- Born: 1609
- Died: 29 December 1665 (aged 55–56); Różana (now Ruzhany, Belarus)
- Noble family: Sapieha
- Consorts: Zofia Zienowicz; Anna Barbara Kopeć
- Father: John Peter Sapieha
- Mother: Zofia Weiher

Paul John Sapieha (Lithuanian: Povilas Jonas Sapiega) (1609–1665) was a Polish–Lithuanian nobleman (szlachcic).

Sapieha became a Hussar Rotmistrz in 1633, courtier in 1635, Obozny of Lithuania in 1638, Podstoli of Lithuania in 1645, voivode of the Vitebsk Voivodeship in 1646, voivode of Vilnius and Grand Hetman of Lithuania in 1656.

He participated in the Battle of Berestechko against Cossacks in 1651. During The Deluge he dislodged the Swedish troops from Lublin, took part in the siege of Warsaw and captured Tykocin Castle in 1657. Together with Stefan Czarniecki, he defeated the Russian army at the Battle of Polonka in 1660.

He was a supporter of the vivente rege elections.

== Marriage and children ==
He first married Zofia Zienowicz, with whom he had two children:

- Teodora Aleksandra Sapieha, married Vladislaus Tyszkiewicz and Aleksander Krzysztof Naruszewicz
- Michał Sapieha.

He later married Anna Barbara Kopeć and had eight more children:

- John Casimir Sapieha (1637–1720), Grand Hetman of Lithuania,
- Benedykt Paweł Sapieha (1643–1707), Lithuanian Grand Treasurer,
- Franciszek Stefan Sapieha (1643–1686), Marshal of the Sejm,
- Leon Bazyli Sapieha (1652–1686), Treasurer of the Lithuanian court and Lithuanian army general,
- Katarzyna Anna Sapieha (161–1717), married Jan Stanisław Lipski and Alexander Michael Lubomirski,
- Konstancja Sapieha (1651–1691), married Hieronim Sanguszko (1651-1685),
- Zofia Sapieha (1650–1694), married Mikołaj Wiktoryn Grudziński (1636-1704),
- Teresa Sapieha (1652–1737)
