= Battle of Polonka =

1660 battle

- Part of the Russo-Polish War (1654–1667)
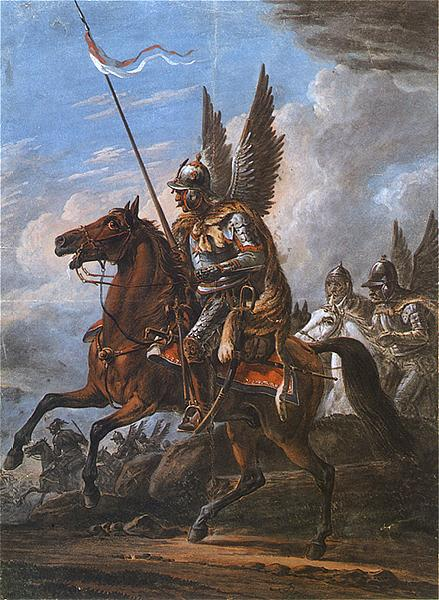
- Attack of the Hussars, by Aleksander Orłowski
Date	29 June 1660
Location	Polonka, in modern Belarus
Result	Polish-Lithuanian victory

Belligerents
Polish–Lithuanian Commonwealth	Tsardom of Russia

Commanders and leaders
(Polish–Lithuanian Commonwealth) Stefan Czarniecki (Polish–Lithuanian Commonwealth) Paweł Jan Sapieha	Ivan Khovansky

Strength
9,000 Lithuanians; 4,000 Poles; 2 cannons	8,000–9,000 troops

Casualties and losses
300 killed unknown number of wounded	3,500 killed and wounded 700 captured

The Battle of Polonka (Połonka, Palonka) took place near Polonka (Połonka in Polish, Palonka in Belarusian, in modern Belarus) during the Polish-Russian War (1658-1667) on 29 June 1660 between Polish-Lithuanian and Russian forces. Polish-Lithuanian army under Stefan Czarniecki and Paweł Jan Sapieha forced a Russian retreat through a carefully planned Polish hussar ambush and several tactically effective flanking maneuvers. The Russian defeat also meant they had to abandon the Siege of Lyakhavichy (Lachowicze).

== Background ==
In late June 1660, after the Treaty of Oliva, a Lithuanian army commanded by Paweł Jan Sapieha attacked Russians, who occupied most of the territory of the Grand Duchy of Lithuania. The Lithuanians were supported by Polish units under Stefan Czarniecki, and their target was to end the siege of Lachowicze. Polish - Lithuanian units, which altogether had 13,000 men and 2 cannons, set off from Słonim. Facing them was a Russian army under Ivan Andreyevich Khovansky (Tararui), who had unknown number of soldiers (some estimates claim 24,000; while some claim only 8,500).

On the morning of 28 June Polish front units, marching towards Baranowicze, crossed the Połonka river, east of the town of Połonka. Here, Poles encountered a Russian unit, and a skirmish began. When main Russian forces arrived, the Poles withdrew behind the river, and Polish - Lithuanian army began preparations for the battle. Poles were placed on the right flank, Lithuanians on the left, while central front was protected by mixed, Polish-Lithuanian units, together with artillery.

== Battle ==
First to attack were the Russians, who stormed the Polonka river levee. They were met with a heavy fire of the Polish-Lithuanian dragoons, and then a Polish hussar unit counterattacked, pushing the Russians back to their starting positions. Khovansky then decided to attack Lithuanian flank, using his cavalry. The Lithuanians, however, fiercely resisted the assault, and did not retreat to the river swamp.

When dragoons of Stefan Czarniecki captured eastern bank of the levee, whole Polish - Lithuanian army carried out a frontal assault. Cavalry unit of Colonel Gabriel Wojnillowicz, which had been hidden behind Polish lines, bypassed the swamp and attacked left wing of the Russians. The Polish hussars and pancerni cavalry forced the Russian foot out of prepared positions, while the Commonwealth cavalry on the right attacked the Russian rear, which drove off the Muscovite horse and left the Russian infantry exposed. The Russians retreated towards Polock, and on the way they were chased by the Lithuanians, who killed hundreds. Khovansky himself managed to survive, together with a small cavalry group. Russian infantry, which remained at the battleground, was massacred or captured by the Commonwealth forces.
