= 1792 in Russia =

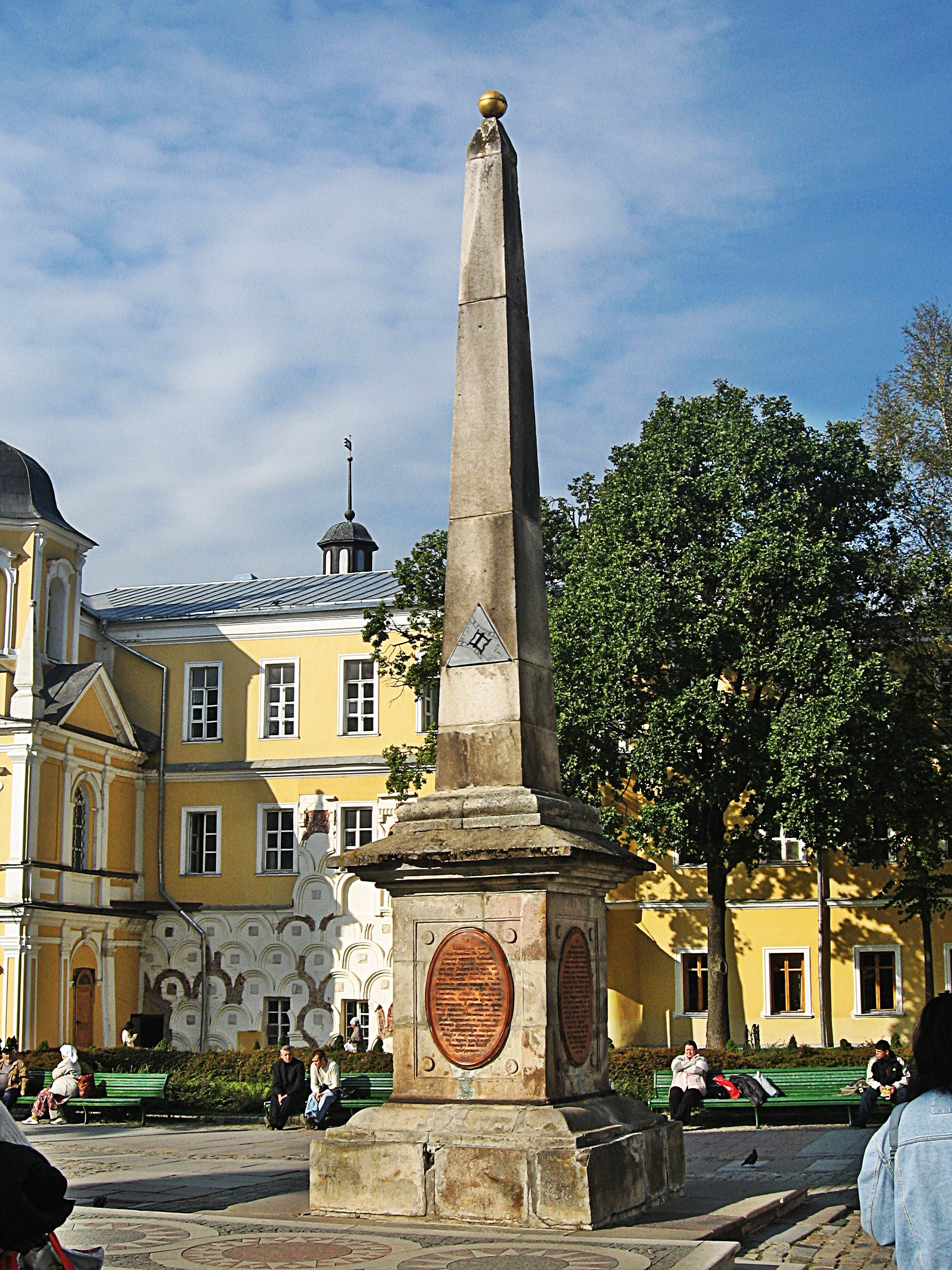
Sergiev Posad-monumento

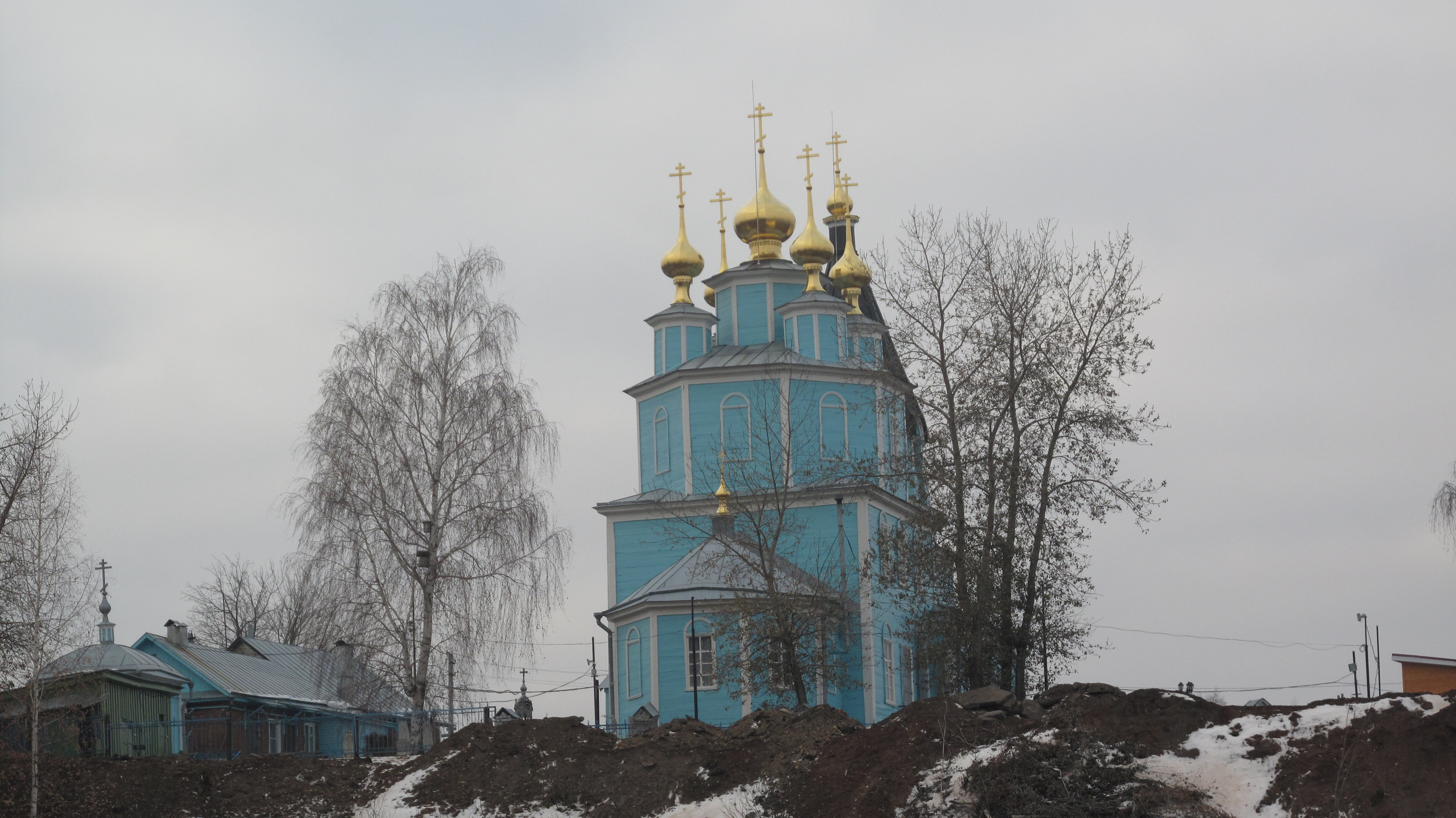
Церковь Казанской Иконы Божией Матери, с. Великий Враг

Events from the year 1792 in Russia

== Incumbents ==
- Monarch – Catherine II

== Events ==
- Russo-Turkish War (1787–92)
  - 9 January - Treaty of Jassy ends war
- Polish–Russian War of 1792
- 26 May - Battle of Opsa
- 11 June - Battle of Mir
- 14 June - Battle of Boruszkowce
- 18 June - Battle of Zieleńce
- 18 July - Battle of Dubienka

== Births ==
- Archimandrite Photius (1792-1838) - religious leader
- Nikolai Lobachevsky (1792-1856) - mathematician
- Mikhail Pavlov (1792-1840) - academic, textbook writer
- Grand Duchess Olga Pavlovna of Russia (1792-1795) - daughter of Paul I of Russia
- Lev Perovski (1792-1856) - nobleman, administrator, and mineralogist
- Pyotr Pletnyov (1792-1866) - poet, literary critic, academic
- Natasha Rostova (b. 1792) - character in War and Peace
- Zinaida Volkonskaya (1792-1862) - writer, poet, composer, singer, salonist, and lady-in-waiting
- Pyotr Vyazemsky (1792-1878) - poet
- Alexander Ypsilantis (1792-1828) - Greek who rose to be a Russian major general

== Deaths ==
- George Browne (1698-1792) - Irishman who became a Russian general and governor of Livonia
- Denis Fonvizin (1745-1792) - playwright of the Russian Enlightenment
- Gavriil Skorodumov (1755-1792) - engraver
- Mikhail Sushkov (1778-1792) - writer, suicide
- Elizaveta Vorontsova (1739-1792) - mistress of Peter III of Russia
