= Levin August von Bennigsen =

German general serving Russia (1745–1826)

Graf Levin August von Bennigsen
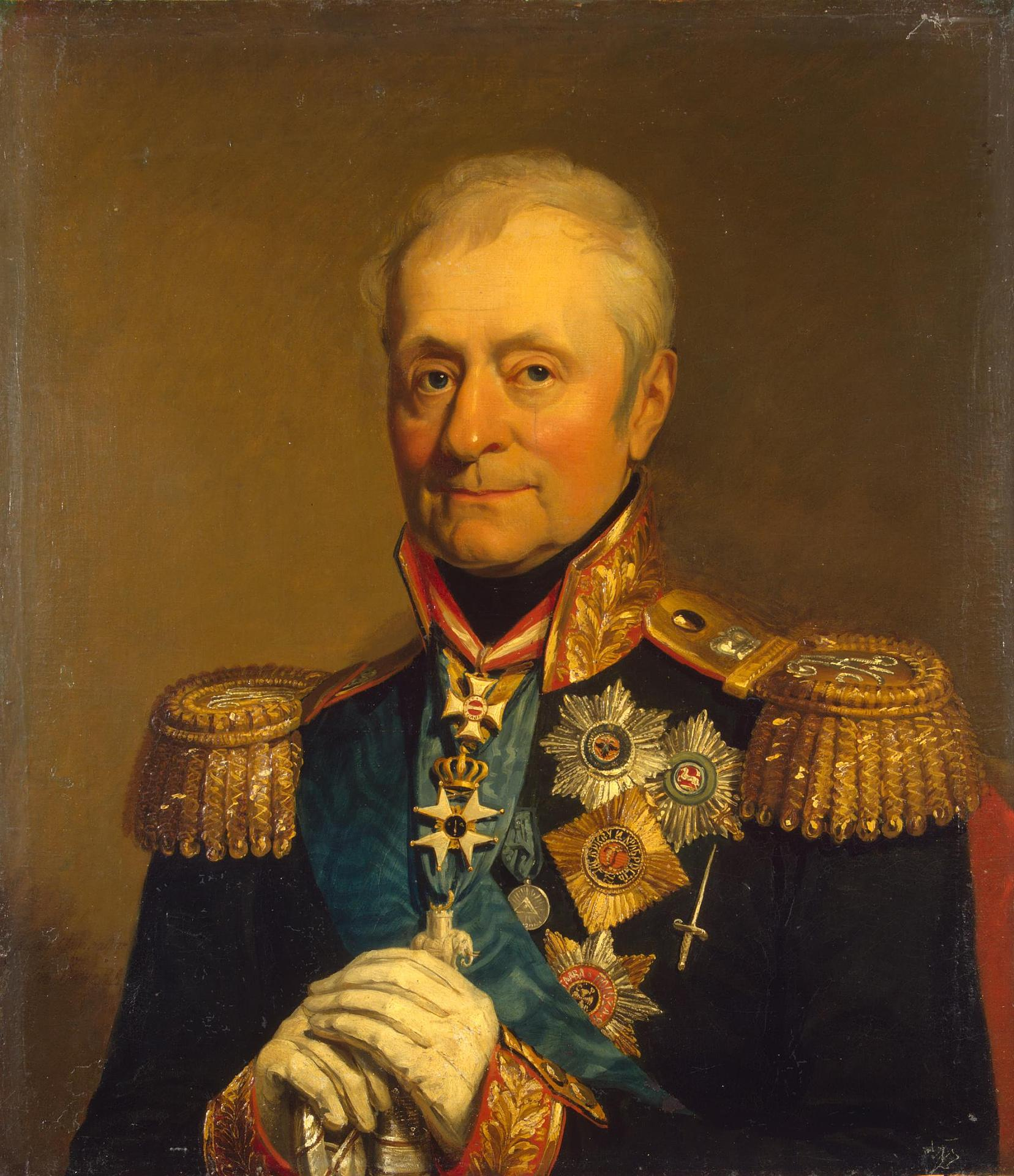
- Portrait by George Dawe (1820)
- Born: 10 February 1745; Braunschweig, Electorate of Hanover, Holy Roman Empire
- Died: 3 December 1826 (aged 81); Banteln, Kingdom of Hanover, German Confederation
- Other name: Leonty Leontyevich Bennigsen
- Children: 8
- Military career
- Allegiance: Hanover; Russia
- Branch: Hanoverian Army; Russian Army
- Rank: General of the cavalry
- Conflicts: See list: Seven Years' War; Russo-Turkish War (1768–1774); Russo-Turkish War (1787–1792); Siege of Ochakov; Polish–Russian War of 1792; Battle of Mir; Battle of Zelwa; Battle of Brest; Kościuszko Uprising; Battle of Lipniszki; Battle of Soły; Persian Expedition of 1796; Siege of Derbent; Napoleonic Wars; War of the Fourth Coalition; Battle of Pułtusk; Battle of Allenstein; Battle of Eylau; Battle of Ostrołęka; Battle of Guttstadt; Battle of Heilsberg; Battle of Friedland; French invasion of Russia; Battle of Borodino; Battle of Tarutino (WIA); War of the Sixth Coalition; Battle of Bautzen; Battle of Lützen; Battle of Leipzig; Siege of Hamburg
- Awards: See list Order of St. Andrew; Order of St. George; Order of St. Vladimir; Order of St. Alexander Nevsky; Order of St. Anna; Golden Weapon for Bravery; Order of the Black Eagle; Royal Guelphic Order; Order of the Elephant; Legion of Honour; Order of the Sword; Military Order of Maria Theresa

Vilna Governor General
- In office July 23, 1801 – October 2, 1806
- Preceded by: Mikhail Kutuzov
- Succeeded by: Alexander Korsakov

Levin August Gottlieb Theophil, Graf von Bennigsen (Russian: Левин Август Готлиб Теофиль фон Беннигсен, romanized: Levin Avgust Gotlib Teofil fon Bennigsen), also known as Leonty Leontyevich Bennigsen (Russian: Леонтий Леонтьевич Беннигсен; 10 February 1745 – 3 December 1826), was a German general in the service of the Russian Empire. Bennigsen made a name for himself in Russian history as the man who fought Napoleon Bonaparte with distinction at the Battle of Eylau; but, suffering from ill-health, he was then defeated at Friedland several months later. Bennigsen also played a pivotal role in decisively defeating Napoleon in the War of the Sixth Coalition.

== Biography ==
=== Early service ===
Bennigsen was born on 10 February 1745 into a Hanoverian noble family in Braunschweig (English toponym: Brunswick). His family owned several estates at Banteln in Hanover. Bennigsen served successively as a page at the Hanoverian court and as an officer of foot-guards, and four years later, in 1763, as captain, he participated in the final campaign of the Seven Years' War. In 1764, after the death of his father and his marriage to Baroness Steinberg, he retired from the Hanoverian Army, and settled at the estates he owned in Banteln. In 1773, shortly after reentering Hanoverian service for a brief period, he entered the Russian service as a field officer, and was subsequently accepted into the Vyatka musketeer regiment in the same year. He fought against the Turks in 1774 and in 1778, becoming lieutenant-colonel in the latter year. In 1787 his conduct at the storming of Ochakov won him promotion to the rank of brigadier, and he distinguished himself repeatedly in fighting the Kościuszko Uprising (battles of Lipniszki, Soły) and in the Persian War of 1796 where he fought at Derbent. On 9 July 1794, he was promoted to major general for his accomplishments in the former campaign, and on 26 September 1794 he was awarded the Order of St. George of the Third Degree and an estate in Minsk Governorate.

In 1798, Bennigsen was fired from military service by Tsar Paul I allegedly because of his connections with Platon Zubov. It is known that he took an active part in the planning phase of the conspiracy to assassinate Paul I, but his role in the actual killing remains a matter of conjecture. Tsar Alexander I made him governor-general of Lithuania in 1801, and in 1802 a general of cavalry.

=== Napoleonic Wars ===
In 1806, Bennigsen was in command of one of the Russian armies operating against Napoleon, when he fought the Battle of Pultusk and met the emperor in person in the bloody battle of Eylau (8 February 1807). In the Battle of Pultusk he resisted French troops under Jean Lannes before retreating. This brought him the Order of St. George of the Second Degree while after the battle of Eylau he was awarded Order of St. Andrew—the highest order in the Russian empire. Here he could claim to have inflicted the first reverse suffered by Napoleon, but six months later Bennigsen met with the crushing defeat of Friedland (14 June 1807) the direct consequence of which was the treaty of Tilsit.

Bennigsen was heavily criticised for the Battle of Friedland and for the decline of discipline in the army and now retired for some years, but in the campaign of 1812 he reappeared in the army in various responsible positions. He was present at Borodino, and defeated Murat in the engagement of Tarutino where he was wounded in the leg, but on account of a quarrel with Marshal Kutuzov, the Russian commander-in-chief, he was compelled to retire from active military employment on 15 November.

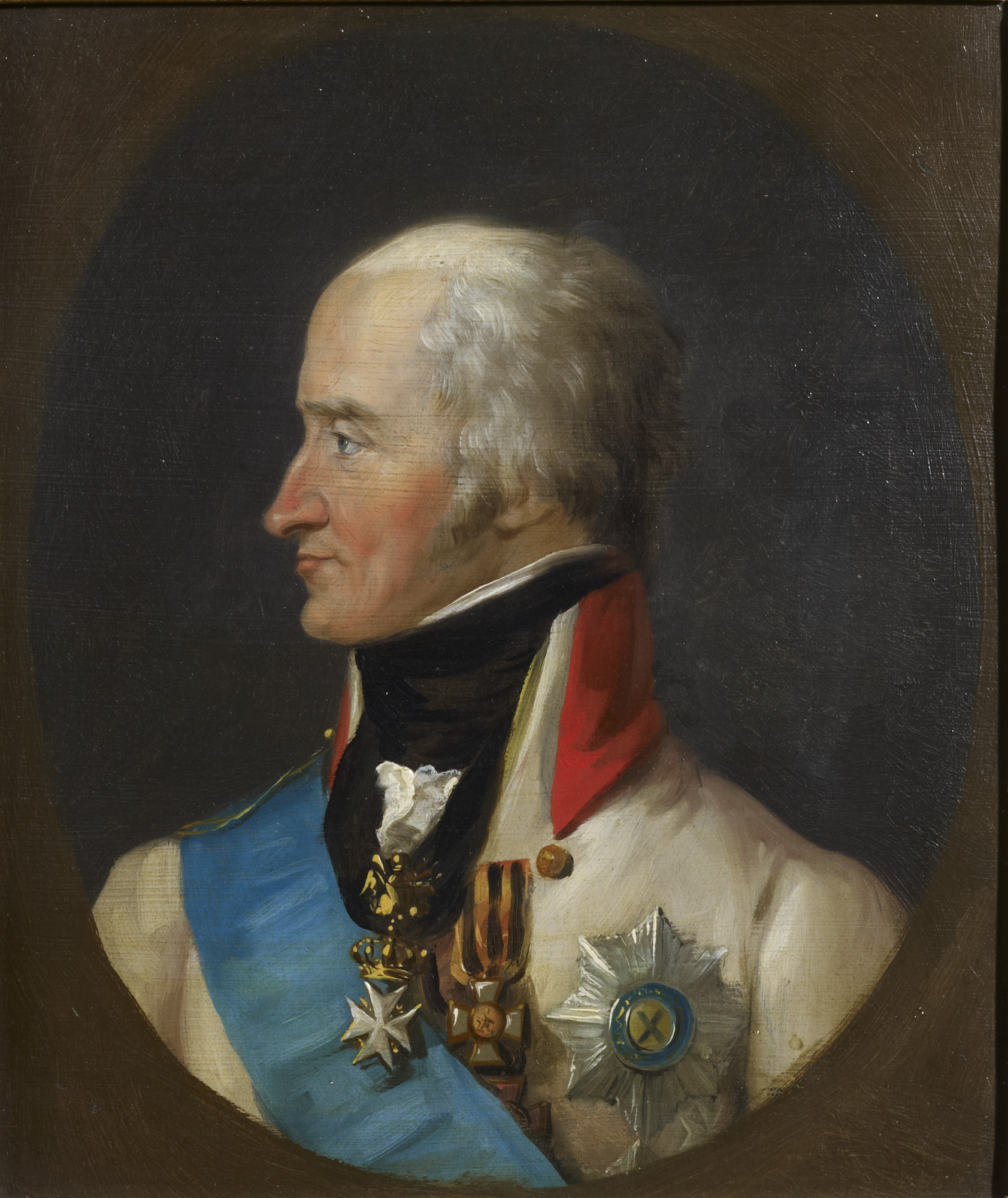
Bennigsen with the Ribbon of Saint George.

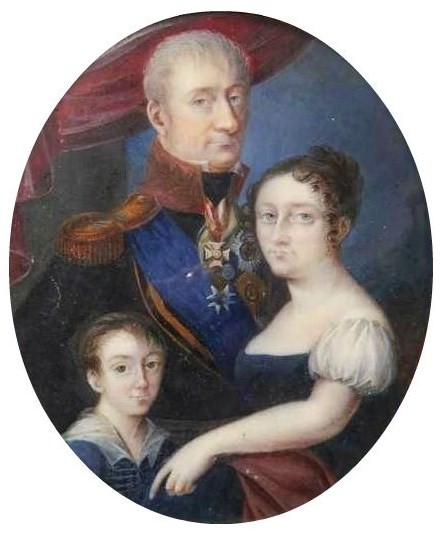
Count Bennigsen and his family * Wife Maria-Leonarda * Son Alexander

After the death of Kutuzov, Bennigsen was recalled and placed at the head of an army. Bennigsen participated in the battles of Bautzen and Lützen, leading one of the columns that made the decisive attack on the last day of the Battle of Leipzig (16–19 October 1813). On the same evening he was made a count by the emperor Alexander I, and he afterwards commanded the forces which operated against Marshal Davout in North Germany, most notably in the year-long Siege of Hamburg (1813–14). After the Treaty of Fontainebleau, he was awarded the St. George order of the First Degree—the highest Russian military order—for his actions in the Napoleonic Wars in general.

=== Later life ===
After the general peace Bennigsen held a command from 1815 to 1818, when he retired from active service and settled on his Hanoverian estate of Banteln near Hildesheim. By the end of his life he completely lost his sight. He died on 3 December 1826, in Banteln, eight years after he had retired. His son, Count Alexander Levin von Bennigsen (1809-1893) was a distinguished Hanoverian statesman.

Bennigsen wrote the three-volume "Mémoires du général Bennigsen", which was published in Paris in 1907-1908. Though they contain "fascinating" details regarding the Russian wars and battles between 1806 and 1813, the work often beautifies historical facts. An English edition of Bennigsen's memoirs of 1806-1807 campaign appeared in 2023.

== Sources ==
- "Беннигсен, Леонтий Леонтьевич" . Brockhaus and Efron Encyclopedic Dictionary (in Russian). 1906.
- Mikaberidze, Alexander (2005). Russian Officer Corps of the Revolutionary and Napoleonic Wars. Casemate Publishers. ISBN 978-1611210026.
- Mikaberidze, Alexander, ed. (2023). Confronting Napoleon: Levin von Bennigsen's Memoir of the Campaign in Poland, 1806–1807. Helion. ISBN 978-1804513057.
- Polovtsov, Alexander (1900). Russian Biographical Dictionary. Vol. II: Алексинский – Бестужев-Рюмин. St. Petersburg: Типография Главного Управления Уделов. pp. 700–712.
