= Battle of Mir (1792) =

Battle in the Polish–Russian War of 1792

Coordinates: 53.4500°N 26.4667°E

- Part of the Polish–Russian War of 1792
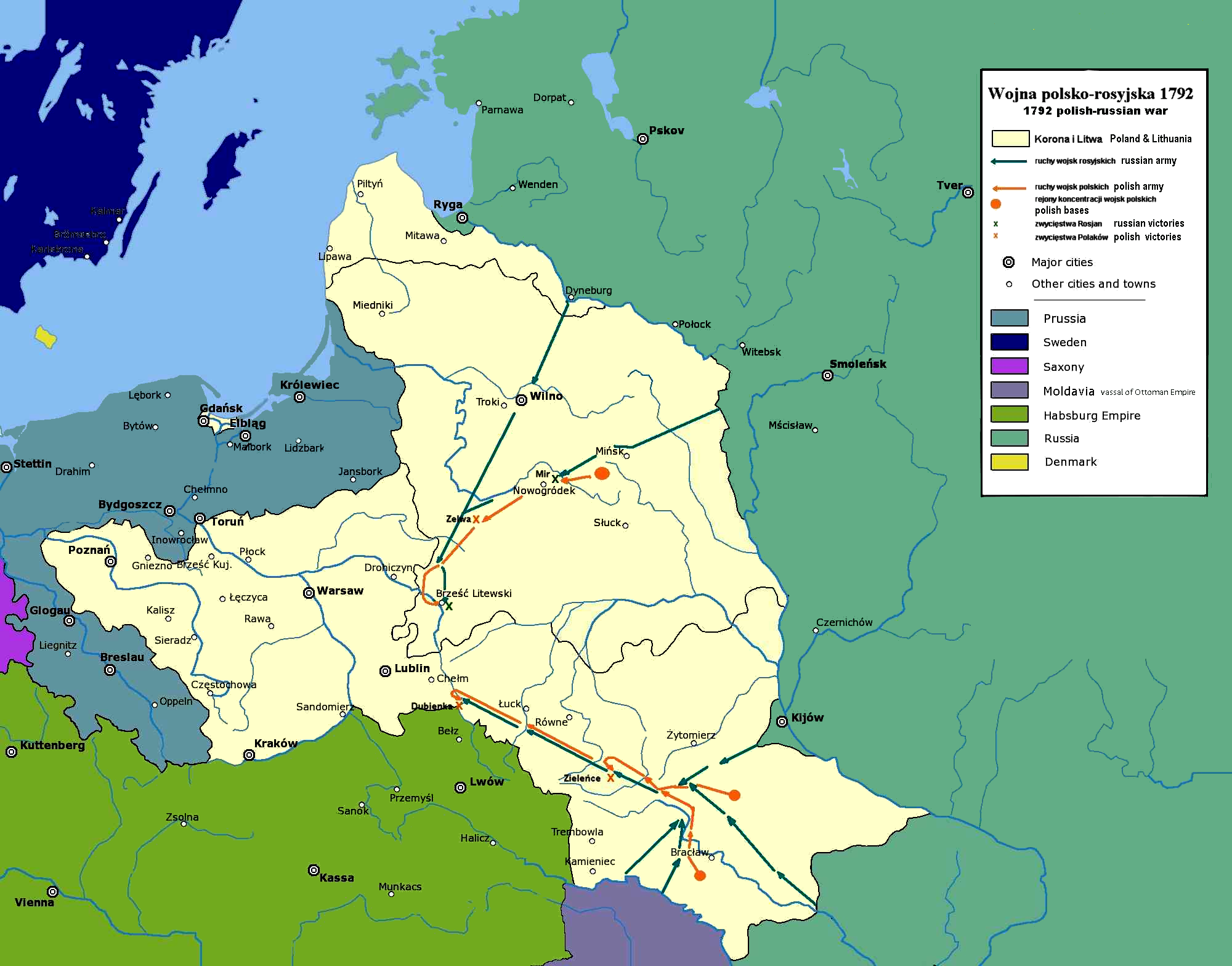
- Map of the Polish–Russian War of 1792
Date	11 June 1792
Location	Mir, Lithuania, Poland–Lithuania (now in Belarus)
Result	Russian victory

Belligerents
Poland–Lithuania	Russian Empire

Commanders and leaders
Józef Judycki	Boris Mellin

Strength
7,700 men	5,500 men

Casualties and losses
120 men and 1 gun	250 men

The Battle of Mir was a battle between Poland–Lithuania and the Russian Empire during the War of 1792. It took place in the town of Mir, now in Belarus, on June 11, 1792.

The battle between Russian veterans from Russia's recent wars with the Ottomans and Sweden and an inexperienced Lithuanian force ended in a Russian victory.

After a Lithuanian cavalry reconnaissance found an unguarded Russian camp, the Lithuanian commander Judycki called a two-hour war council due to his inability to decide on whether to attack. This time delay gave time for the Russian forces to regroup and thus they were able to prepare a final attack.

== Background ==
On 1 June 1792, two weeks into the Russian invasion of Poland–Lithuania, King Stanisław August Poniatowski stripped Duke Louis of Württemberg of his supreme command of the Grand Ducal Lithuanian Army, and then, on 7 June, entrusted it to Józef Judycki. Doubting his military prowess, he was assigned numerous advisers (including Stanisław Kostka Potocki and Tomasz Wawrzecki).

Unfortunately, both Duke Louis of Württemberg's negligence and Judycki's military incompetence led to the defeat of the Lithuanian corps during its retreat from the assembly area near Minsk.

A battle took place near Mir between the Grand Ducal Lithuanian Army, commanded by Józef Judycki, and the Belarusian Corps of the Imperial Russian Army, commanded by Boris Mellin. The battle ended in defeat for the Lithuanian forces.

== Prelude ==
General Judycki had gathered the main Lithuanian forces, numbering 7,700 soldiers and 10 guns, near Minsk. Faced with the threat posed by General Mellin's corps, numbering 9,600 soldiers and 13 guns, approaching from Barysaw, and by Hans von Fersen's corps of 5,500 soldiers marching from Babruysk to Slutsk, Judycki began a retreat on 31 May via Stolbtsy to Sverzhan, from where he set off for Mir on 9 June.

During the retreat, General Józef Bielak's Lithuanian cavalry fought a three-hour battle with Mellin's vanguard whilst crossing the Nemunas near Stolbtsy, after which they followed the main forces to Mir. On June 10, Mellin's corps encamped at the village of Stary Sverzhan. The next day, on June 11, he began his attack on the Lithuanian force in Mir.

=== Russian attack begins ===
Mellin, having ferried his forces across the Nemunas, took up positions near Zaluzhzha. On the morning of 11 June, he dispatched two columns of 2,000 soldiers each to outflank the Lithuanian positions near Mir from the north and south. One column was commanded by Friedrich von Buxhoeveden, and the other by Levin von Bennigsen. With the remainder of the corps' forces, Mellin intended to engage the Lithuanians in battle that afternoon and, once the two columns had outflanked the Lithuanian wings, to attack Judycki’s forces from three sides.

==== Afternoon reconnaissance ====
At the same time, Judycki sent a strong raiding party of 900 soldiers and 4 guns towards Zaluzhzha, led by General Stanisław Potocki. When Potocki approached the Russian camp unnoticed at around 2 PM, he assessed that the Russian forces were weak and informed Judycki about this. When the Russian troops spotted Potocki's group, they set off in pursuit. Pursued by Mellin, Potocki joined the main Lithuanian forces about 3 kilometres (1.9 mi) from Mir.

The Lithuanian forces formed up in two lines. The first line comprised two infantry battalions and the 2nd Lithuanian National Cavalry Brigade, whilst the second line consisted of four and a half infantry battalions, the 1st Lithuanian National Cavalry Brigade and two cavalry regiments (including the 4th Lithuanian Vanguard Regiment). Mellin, who at that point had 5,600 soldiers and 13 guns, deployed his forces in a single line, set up three batteries and opened artillery fire. However, he held off on the attack, waiting for the arrival of the columns he had sent ahead.

== Order of Battle ==
=== Lithuanian side ===
Commander-in-Chief, Lieutenant General Judycki

==== First line - from left to right (2,130 soldiers) ====
- 2nd Lithuanian National Cavalry Brigade under Twardowski (1,125 soldiers) - flanking the infantry on both sides
- I/5th Infantry Regiment (500 soldiers)
- I/1st Infantry Regiment (505 soldiers)

==== Second line from left to right flank (5,499 soldiers) ====
- 1st Lithuanian National Cavalry Brigade under Sulistrowski (1,325 soldiers) - flanking the infantry on both sides
- 4th Lithuanian Vanguard Regiment under Bielak (611 soldiers)
- I/2nd Infantry Regiment (467 soldiers)
- I/4th Infantry Regiment (500 soldiers)
- I/6th Infantry Regiment (515 soldiers)
- I/8th Infantry Regiment (619 soldiers)
- II/8th Infantry Regiment (676 soldiers)
- 1st Lithuanian Vanguard Regiment under Kirkor (786 soldiers)
- 10 3-pounder guns

=== Russian side ===
Commander-in-Chief, Lieutenant-General Mellin

==== Cavalry under the command of Major-General Bergman ====
- Timofey Grekov's Cossacks (around 400 mounted men)

==== Infantry (3,360) ====
- I/Murom Musketeer Regiment (960)
- ½ of II/Murom Musketeer Regiment (around 480)
- two battalions of the Kozlovskiy Musketeers (960 × 2 = 1,920)

==== Benningsen's Column (1,360) ====
- 6 squadrons of the Izyum Light Cavalry Regiment (880)
- ½ of II/Murom Musketeer Regiment (around 480)

==== Buxhoeveden's Column (2,100) ====
- 10 squadrons of Smolensk Dragoon Regiment (1,500)
- II/Estonian Jäger Corps (600 soldiers)
- In addition, 13 6- and 12-pounder guns

== Battle ==
Judycki, who was unable to decide whether to engage in battle, convened a war council that lasted two hours. Meanwhile, his troops were under fire from Russian artillery. As the Lithuanian units, consisting mainly of fresh and inexperienced recruits, had been exposed to Russian fire for too long, panic broke out. Most and a part of the 1st and 2nd Lithuanian National Cavalry Brigades retreated in the direction of Mir. Soon afterwards, Bielak's 4th Lithuanian Vanguard Regiment did the same.

When, at around 7:30 PM, Buxhövden's and Bennigsen's columns appeared behind the Lithuanian forces, advancing from two sides, Judycki – facing the threat of encirclement – ordered a retreat at 8 PM. During the retreat, thanks to the presence of mind of Colonel Jakub Jasiński, the Lithuanians repelled an attack by the Russian cavalry and withdrew unhindered towards Nyasvizh. The castle garrison left behind in Mir, together with the supply trains, also withdrew via side roads.

The Lithuanians lost around 120 soldiers and one gun in the battle, whilst the Russians lost around 250 soldiers.

On that same day, the Russians stormed and captured the castle at Mir. Judycki himself abandoned his troops and fled to Grodno, for which he was officially dismissed on 24 June 1792, though in reality this had already taken place on 19 June. Michał Zabiełło became the new commander, after which the Battle of Zelva soon took place, followed by the fierce defence of Brest and the battles to defend the crossings on the Bug River at Granne and Krzemień.

== Sources ==
=== In Polish ===
- Derdej, Piotr (2000). Zieleńce-Mir-Dubienka 1792 (in Polish). Warszawa: Bellona. ISBN 83-11-09108-0.
- Łojek, Jerzy (1986). Geneza i obalenie Konstytucji 3 maja: polityka zagraniczna Rzeczypospolitej 1787–1792 [The Genesis and Overthrow of the Constitution of May 3: Foreign Policy of the Republic in 1787–1792] (in Polish). Lubelskie. ISBN 978-83-222-0313-2.
- Wolański, Adam (1996). Wojna polsko-rosyjska 1792 r. (in Polish). Warszawa: Volumen. ISBN 83-85218-48-3.

=== In Russian ===
- MSA (1908). Хронологический Указатель военных действий русской армии и флота [Chronological Index of Military Operations of the Russian Army and Navy] (in Russian). Vol. 1: 1695–1800. St. Petersburg: Type-Lithography of the St. Petersburg Prison.
