= 4th Lithuanian Vanguard Regiment =

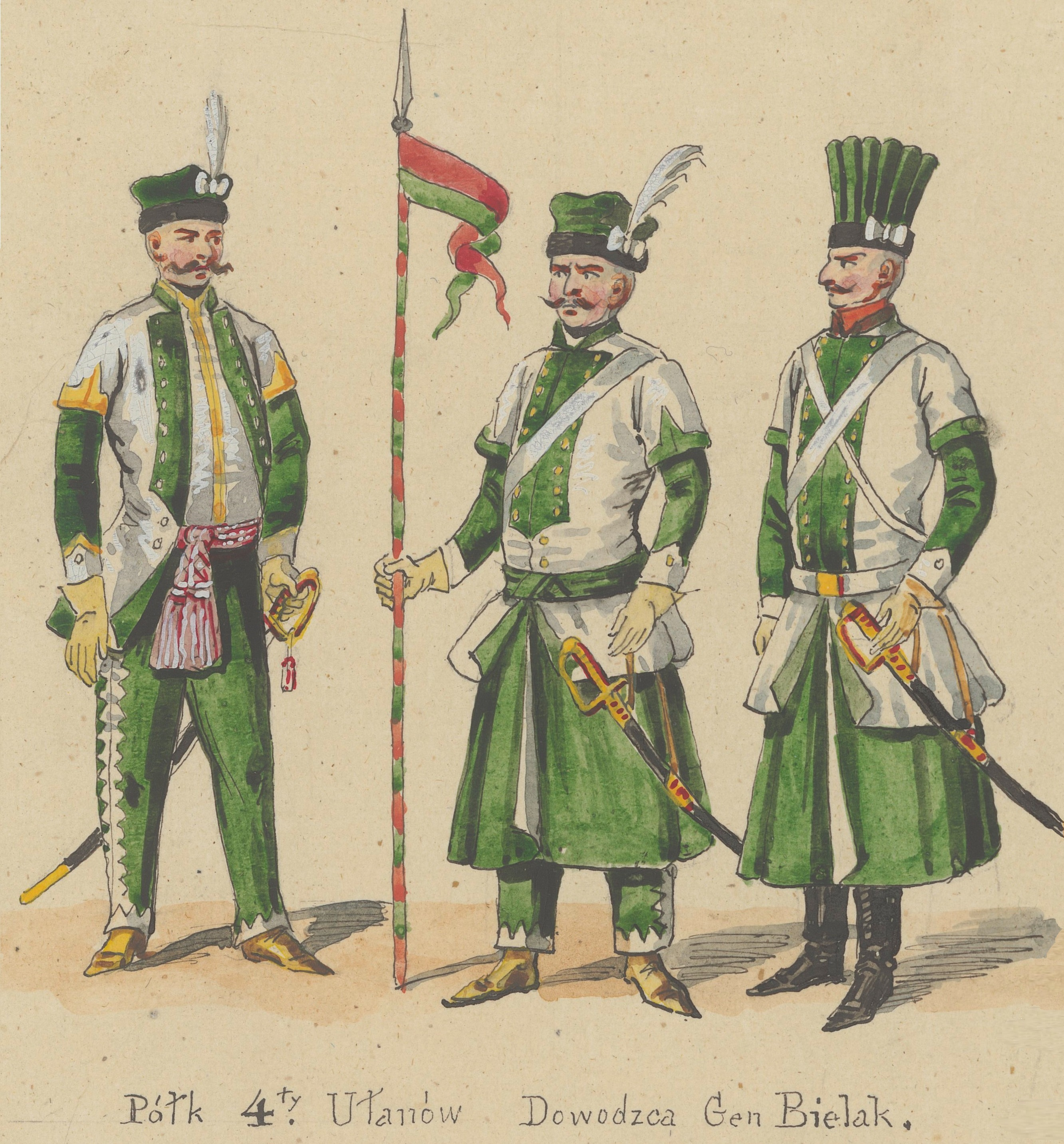
- Officer, Retainer and Companion of the regiment in 1775
- Active: 1733-1795
- Country: Grand Duchy of Lithuania (1733-1738); Electorate of Saxony (1739-1763); Grand Duchy of Lithuania (1764-1795)
- Type: Cavalry
- Garrison/HQ: Kamyenyets (1782-1787); Barysaw (1790-1795)
- Engagements: War in Defence of the Constitution: Battle of Zelwa; Kościuszko Uprising: Battle of Maciejowice; Battle of Praga

The 4th Lithuanian Vanguard Regiment (Polish: 4 Pułk Litewski Przedniej Straży) was a military unit of the Grand Duchy of Lithuania. The full name was 4th Lithuanian Advance Guard Regiment of Josef Bielak.

== History ==
=== Origins ===
Formed in 1733 by gathering all cavalry banners of the Voivode of Kiev Potocki family, mostly composed of Tatars. Aleksander Ułan commanded the regiment in 1734.

=== Electorate of Saxony ===
This regiment was leased to the Royal Saxon Army during the Wettin dynasty's reign and continuously fought in the War of Polish Succession (1734-1738), War of the Austrian Succession (1740-1748) and the Seven Years War (1756-1763).

=== Grand Duchy of Lithuania ===
In 1764, it was summoned by the Sejm of 1764 to return to Lithuania.

==== Bar Confederation ====
The regiment fought against the Wettin dynasty's supporters.

==== 1772-1792 ====
The regiment was stationed in Kamieniec Litewski (1782-87) and Barysaw (1790 onwards).

War in Defence of the Constitution

The regiment fought in the battles of Swierzenic, Mir and Zelwa.

==== Kościuszko Uprising ====
Under Józef Bielak's command, the regiment took part in the battles of Izabelin, Mscibow, Brzesc, Dereczyn, Maciejowice, Praga.

== Uniforms ==
In 1776-89, all the officers and soldiers in the regiment had white cockades, with the officers also having white plumes. The towarzycz had red belts and plumes, meanwhile, the rankers had only white belts.

== Commanders ==
Pułkowniks:

- Sichodziński (1733-1756),
- Czymbaj Murza Rudnicki (1756-1764),
- gen. mjr. Józef Bielak (17 April 1764 - 1794 [death])
- Mustafa Murza Achmatowicz (1794).
