= Józef Bielak =

18th-century Polish-Lithuanian general

- Born: c. 1730; Lovchitse estate, Nowogródek Voivodeship
- Died: 11 June 1794 (aged 62–63) Studzianki, near Lublin
- Allegiance: Polish–Lithuanian Commonwealth
- Branch: Cavalry
- Service years: 1761–1794
- Commands: 4th Lithuanian Vanguard Regiment

Józef Bielak (c. 1730 – 11 June 1794) was a Lipka Tatar general, who fought in the Bar Confederation, the Polish–Russian War of 1792 and the Kościuszko Uprising of 1794. He commanded the 4th Lithuanian Advance Guard Regiment from 1763 to his death in 1794.

== Early life ==
He was the son of Samuel Osman Bielak and Regina née Rudnicka.

== Military career ==
=== Seven Years' War (1761–1763) ===
In 1761 he became a captain in general Czymbaj Murza Rudnicki's regiment, which was assigned to the Royal Saxon army until 1764. With it, he fought in Silesia, Saxony and Czechia during the Seven Years' War. In 1763 he was promoted to colonel and a year later he became the commander of the 4th Lithuanian Vanguard Regiment.

=== Bar Confederation (1768–1772) ===
During the Bar Confederation he fought on the side of the Confederates, under the command of Casimir Pulaski against the Russians. In 1771, however, he passed over to the king's side. However, he soon returned to the Confederates and fought in the Battle of Stołowicze. In 1772 he became a major general of the Lithuanian army.

After the fall of the confederation, he returned to Koszoły, which was granted to him by King Augustus III for his war merits in 1763.

=== Four Years' Sejm (1788–1792) ===
In the years 1788-1789, he suppressed Ukrainian peasant revolts.

He distinguished himself in the War in Defence of the Constitution, commanding the Lithuanian Vanguard corps. He participated, among others in the battles of Mir, Zelwa and Lietuvos Brasta. He was one of the most talented commanders of this campaign, for which he was decorated with the Knight's Cross of Virtuti Militari.

=== Kościuszko Uprising (1794) ===
During the Kościuszko Uprising, he led the Lithuanian corps formed in Gardinas. He died of natural causes during the uprising. He was buried in Studzianka.

== Family ==
He had thirteen children from two marriages. With Urszula née Łosiów he had a son Abraham, and with Kunegunda née Tuhan-Baranowska: Samuel (lieutenant colonel), Mustafa (captain), Machmet (lieutenant), Albrycht (lieutenant), Osman (ensign), Soliman (lieutenant), Bohdan (killed in the November Uprising), Bekier, Elijah, Elżbieta, Ewa and Felicjan. After Józef's death in 1794, his wife Kunegunda married his adjutant, also Tatar, Tupalski.

== Sources ==
- Filipow, Krzysztof (1990). Order Virtuti Militari 1792-1945. Warsaw.
- Hordejuk, Sławomir (2010). "Ułańskie korzenie" (PDF). Przegląd Tatarski.
- Podhorodecki, Leszek (2010). Tatarzy. Warsaw: Bellona. ISBN 9788311118010.
- Biržiška, Mykolas (1935). "Juozas Bieliakas". In Vaclovas Biržiška (ed.). Lietuviškoji enciklopedija (in Lithuanian). Vol. III: Batoras–Bohatta. Kaunas: Spaudos Fondas. pp. 915–916.
