= Battle of Boruszkowce =

Battle in the Polish–Russian War of 1792

Coordinates: 49.9725°N 27.6311°E

- Part of the Polish–Russian War of 1792
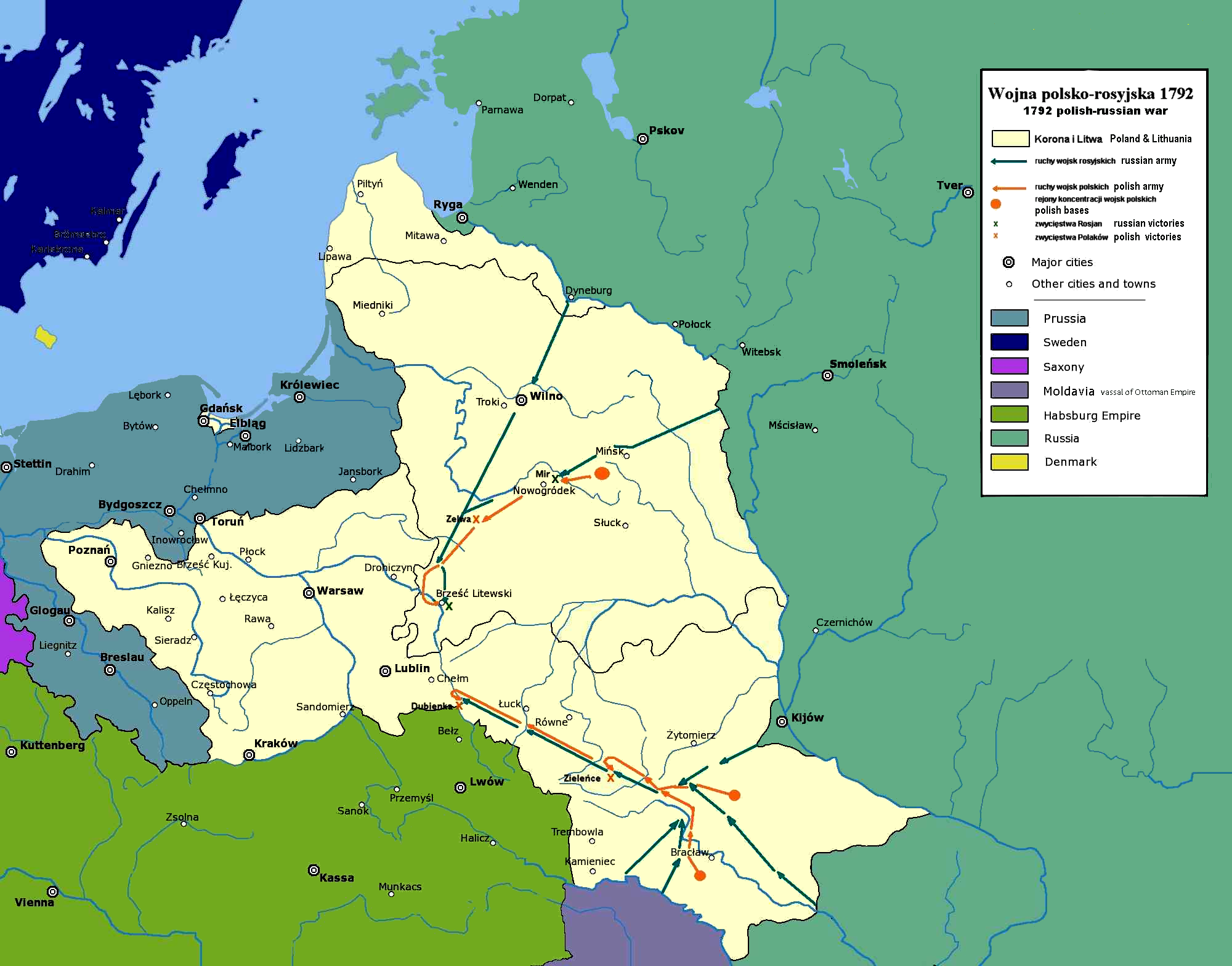
- Map of the Polish–Russian War of 1792
Date	14 June 1792
Location	Borushkivtsi (Борушківці), Ukraine
Result	Russian victory

Belligerents
Poland-Lithuania	Russian Empire

Commanders and leaders
Michał Wielhorski	Mikhail Kakhovsky

Strength
6,500; 12 guns	5,000

The Battle of Boruszkowce was a battle in the Polish–Russian War of 1792. The battle took place on 14 June 1792, between a detachment of a Polish army of Michał Wielhorski and a Russian army group under the command of Mikhail Kakhovsky.

Main Polish forces under command of Poniatowski withdrew to Połonne across Czantoria; they were secured from the south by a division under command of Kościuszko. A Polish army train, secured by a division of Wielhorski, moved the shortest way across Boruszkowice. Wielhorski had under his command 6,500 soldiers and 12 cannons. The route which he moved was sodden and an area in which were forests allowing Russian formations cover making it difficult for Polish defence. After getting information about Polish withdrawal, Mikhail Kakhovsky rallied two Cossacks regiments under command of Alexey Orlov and a part of cavalry under command of Alexander Tormasov. These forces attacked and destroyed the rear of the Polish train. There were clashes between the Polish and Russian cavalry and fighting between Polish and Russian infantry and artillery. In all probability, the Polish cavalry successfully defended against the first attack of Russian cavalry then withdrew. Infantry and artillery began defence of train. The collapsing of bridge on the swamp river Derevichka was in truth a trap. Polish infantry (1,000 soldiers) and artillery successfully defended against the Russians who were able to receive reinforcements during fight. When the Polish did not get relief, they began withdrawal under enemy fire. The Polish division received heavy losses of soldiers, 7 cannons, and a train. The only positive result was the halting of the Russian rally for several hours.

== Bibliography ==
- Piotr Derdej Zieleńce-Mir-Dubienka 1792 Bellona Warsaw 2000 48-75 pages.
