= Battle of Lipniszki =

Battle of the Kościuszko Uprising

- Part of the Kościuszko Uprising
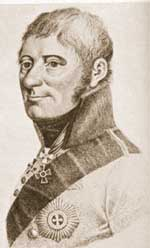
- Leonty Leontyevich Bennigsen
Date	May 27, 1794 (Note: O.S. 16 May)
Location	Lipniszki, Grand Duchy of Lithuania (today Belarus)
Result	Russian victory

Belligerents
Russian Empire	Poland–Lithuania

Commanders and leaders
Leonty Bennigsen	Jakub Jasiński; Antoni Chlewiński

Strength
4,400 18 cannons	>5,000 soldiers & artillery

Casualties and losses
~150	~200

The Battle of Lipniszki took place on 27 May 1794 (Old Style: 16 May) during the Polish uprising led by Tadeusz Kościuszko. The battle ended in a Russian victory under the leadership of Bennigsen, who fought in it against the divisions of Jasiński and Chlewiński.

== Sources ==
=== In Polish ===
- Kukiel, Marian (1929). Zarys historii wojskowości w Polsce (in Polish). Kraków: Krakowska Spółka Wydawnicza. ISBN 0907587992.
- Twardowski, Bolesław (1894). Wojsko Polskie Kościuszki w roku 1794 (in Polish). Poznań: Księgarnia Katolicka.

==== Wydawnictwo MON ====
- Grabski, Andrzej; Wimmer, Jan (1966). Zarys dziejów wojskowości polskiej do roku 1864 (in Polish). Warszawa: Wydawnictwo Ministerstwa Obrony Narodowej.
- Zahorski, Andrzej (1960). "Polska sztuka wojenna w okresie powstania kościuszkowskiego". Wypisy źródłowe do historii polskiej sztuki wojennej (in Polish). 10. Warszawa: Wydawnictwo Ministerstwa Obrony Narodowej.
- Mała Encyklopedia Wojskowa (in Polish). Vol. 2 (1st ed.). Warsaw: Wydawnictwo Ministerstwa Obrony Narodowej. 1967.
