= Battle of Opsa =

- Part of the Polish–Russian War of 1792
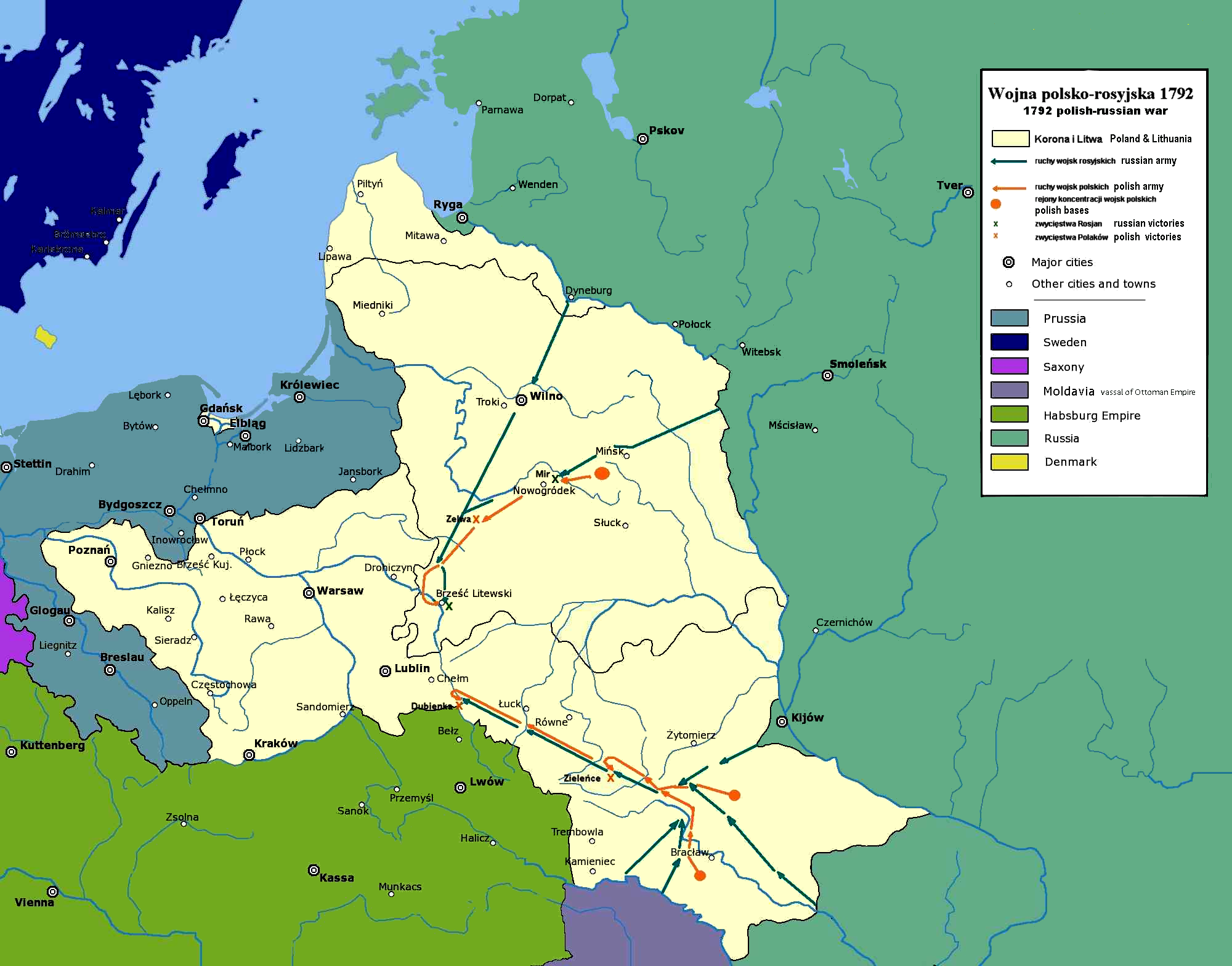
- Map of the Polish–Russian War of 1792
Date	25–26 May 1792
Location	Opsa, Grand Duchy of Lithuania (now Belarus)
Result	Russian victory

Belligerents
Poland–Lithuania	Russian Empire

Commanders and leaders
Michał Kirkor	Yuri Dolgorukov

Strength
1 Regiment	Several hundred men

Casualties and losses
300	50–300

The Battle of Opsa took place on 26 May 1792, during the Polish-Russian War of 1792.

The battle was fought near the tiny village of Opsa, near Brasław, Grand Duchy of Lithuania (present-day Belarus), between the Russian corps of Prince Yuri Dolgorukov and the Tatar regiment of the Grand Duchy, commanded by Michał Kirkor. The battle ended in a Russian victory, as the Lithuanians were forced to retreat and the Russians occupied Brasław.

== Prelude ==
Prince Dolgorukov's corps (9000 soldiers) crossed the Daugava River on 22 May, with the majority of the troops and tabor crossing at Dyneburg, while the rest of the troops under the command of General Johann von Rautenfeld crossed the river at Krasław. Both columns of the Russian corps then moved on Brasław.

Soon after crossing to the other bank of the Daugava, Rautenfeld sent his Don Cossacks to scout the town of Druja. Cossack intelligence indicated that a Lithuanian Tatar banner under the command of Rotmistrz Rejżewski was stationed in the town. Upon their return, the Cossacks smashed a detachment sent by Kirkor's regiment, and captured two Lithuanian Tatar uhlans. Rautenfeld immediately sent a detachment of 160 soldiers. However, when Rejżewski learned of the advancing Russians, he withdrew to Głębokie. Rautenfeld gave up the pursuit and continued to march on Brasław, which he occupied on 26 May.

== The battle ==
There are two known accounts describing the battle of Opsa - one by Szymon Zabiełło, and the other by Józef Sułkowski.

According to Zabiełło, when Rautenfeld took Brasław, the bulk of Dolgorukov's corps marched on Opsa. The vanguard was made up of 100 Cossacks led by Captain Belogorodtsev. Belogorodtsev sent a seven-man scout detachment, who stumbled on a similar reconnaissance troop from Kirkor's Tatar regiment. This led to fighting in the vicinity of Opsa, during which Kirkor's regiment fought against a Cossack force of a few hundred men led by Colonel Kireyev. After a few hours of fighting, the Lithuanian regiment was forced to retreat. Rotmistrz Miłłaszewicz was captured, and Lieutenant Achmatowicz was severely wounded. Zabiełło believed that a few dozen Russian soldiers were killed.

Sułkowski writes that Kirkor's regiment watched the movements of the Russian troops. Rautenfeld encircled Opsa on the night of 25 May, with the aim of neutralising the Lithuanian Tatar force. Kirkor wanted to avoid being captured by the Russians, so he threw his regiment into a desperate attack, which allowed him to break out of the encirclement and retreat. During the fighting, the Lithuanians lost 300 troops, and the Russians lost between fifty and 300 men.

== Sources ==
- Borawski, Piotr (1986). Tatarzy w dawnej Rzeczypospolitej [Tatars in the former Republic]. Warsaw: Ludowa Spółdzielnia Wydawnicza. pp. 224–225. ISBN 83-205-3747-9.
