= 1st Lithuanian Vanguard Regiment =

- Active: 1776–1795
- Country: Grand Duchy of Lithuania
- Type: Cavalry
- Garrison/HQ: Anykščiai and Rechytsa (1789); Khalopyenichy (1790); Vidžiai (1792)
- Engagements: Polish–Russian War of 1792

The 1st Lithuanian Vanguard Regiment (Lithuanian: 1-as priešakinės sargybos J. K. D. D. L. Kunigaikštijos pulkas; Polish: 1 Pułk Litewski Przedniej Straży) was a military unit of the Grand Duchy of Lithuania. The full name was 1st Advance Guard Regiment of HM the Grand Duke of Lithuania.

== History ==
=== Origins ===
Formed in 1776 as light ulans from light cavalry banners and was called an uhlan regiment.

=== Great Sejm 1788-1792 ===
The regiment was stationed in Anykščiai and Rechytsa (1789), Khalopyenichy (1790), Vidžiai (1792).

=== War of 1792 ===
The regiment fought in the:

- Battle of Apsas (Polish: Opsa) on 22 May 1792
- Battle of Mistibava (Polish: Mścibów) on 10 July 1792
- Battle of Voiškiai (Polish: Wojszki) on 14 July 1792

== After the Polish-Lithuanian Commonwealth ==
After the Kościuszko Uprising, the regiment was transferred into Russian army as Lithuanian-Tatar Regiment.
