= Michał Wielhorski (younger) =

Polish noble and general (1755–1805)

Michał Wielhorski (1755–1805) was a Polish-Lithuanian count. In 1789, he was a brigadier of the Polish Crown Army. In 1792, he was made a lieutenant general of that army and he fought in the War of 1792. During the Kościuszko Uprising, he was a lieutenant general of the Grand Ducal Lithuanian army.

Son of Michał Wielhorski, brother of General Józef Wielhorski. He was an officer in the Habsburg army. He was in the same regiment as Józef Poniatowski, and was his friend. They fought together in the Austro-Turkish War (1788–1791) and were both wounded at Šabac in 1788. Together they entered service in the Polish Crown Army. Wielhorski was the brigadier of the 2nd Ukrainian National Cavalry Brigade with the rank of colonel. In 1792, he was a lieutenant general as the commander of the 2nd Ukrainian Division. He fought in the Volyn campaign. He was beaten at Boruszkowce. Poniatowski's right hand in the War of 1792, where he distinguished himself in the battle of Zieleńce (he and Poniatowski were accused of speaking German on the battlefield). After Stanisław Poniatowski joined the Targowica Confederation, he resigned and emigrated.

He came to the Polish-Lithuanian Commonwealth again with Poniatowski to join the Kościuszko Uprising in May 1794, where, as a lieutenant general, he was the commander of the Lithuanian army from June 4, after the resignation of Jakub Jasiński. However, the military actions he conducted in Lithuania and in defense of Vilnius were unsuccessful, as he lacked support and his predecessor's energy and charisma. As a result of inaction, he lost Vilnius, then broke down and asked for his resignation. However, he later fought to defend Praga.

Being seriously ill with his eyes, he went for treatment, and on August 5, by the decision of Tadeusz Kościuszko, he was replaced as the commander of the Lithuanian army by Stanisław Mokronowski. After Kościuszko was taken prisoner, the new commander, Tomasz Wawrzecki, proposed Wielhorski as a member of the War Council, which was blocked by the "Jacobite" faction. Wielhorski was one of the main figures of the "court" faction of the insurgents, together with Prince Józef, Stanisław Mokronowski and Eustachy Sanguszko.

Suffering for the rest of his life from complications from a head wound near Šabac, he died in Vienna in 1805.

He was the third after Poniatowski and Kościuszko on the original list of awarded the Order of Virtuti Militari, the highest Polish-Lithuanian military award, in 1792.

== Bibliography ==
- Kosk, H. P. (2001). Generalicja polska (in Polish). Vol. 2. Pruszków: Ajaks.
