= Stanisław Mokronowski =

Polish noble and general (1761–1821)

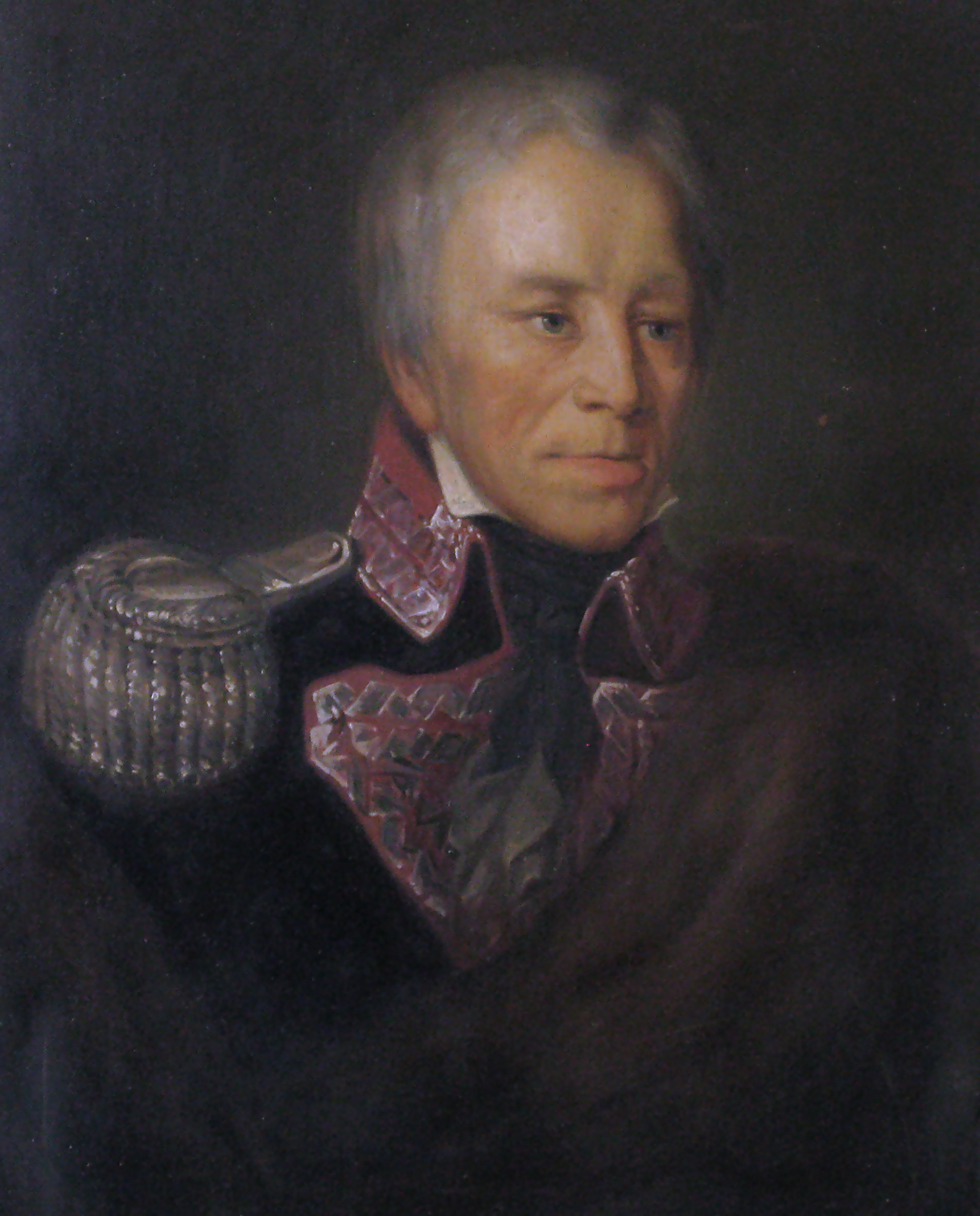
- Coat of arms: Bogoria coat of arms
- Born: January 10, 1761; Bogucin
- Died: October 19, 1821 (aged 60); Warsaw
- Family: Mokronowski
- Spouse: Maria Marianna Sanguszko-Kowelska
- Issue: Antonina Mokronowski
- Father: Ludwik Mokronowski
- Mother: Józefa née Czosnowska
- Military career
- Allegiance: Poland–Lithuania
- Branch: Military of the Polish–Lithuanian Commonwealth
- Conflicts: Treelike list: Polish–Russian War of 1792; Kościuszko Uprising; Warsaw Uprising (1794); Battle of Błonie (1794); Battle of Kobyłka; Battle of Brest (1794)

Stanisław Mokronowski (1761-1821) was a prominent member of the Polish landed gentry of Bogoria coat of arms. A general of the Polish Army and a royal Chamberlain, Mokronowski took part in both the Polish–Russian War of 1792 (War in the Defence of the Constitution) and Kościuszko's Uprising of 1794.

== Early life ==
Stanisław Mokronowski was born in 1761 to Ludwik Mokronowski and Józefa née Czosnowska. Educated by Jesuits, he later studied at the Szkoła Rycerska (Knight's School, also known as the Cadet Corps) in Warsaw, and later in Paris. He entered the military service in Poland, but for a few years he served in the French military.

== Polish-Lithuanian Commonwealth ==
=== Four-Year Sejm ===
He returned to Poland in 1788, and on the sejmik at Wyszogród land he was elected the deputy to the national Sejm (parliament), thus becoming a member of the famous Great Sejm. He became allied to the Poniatowski family.

In 1792, during the War in the Defence of the Constitution he held the rank of vicebrigadier (wicebrygadier), and after distinguishing himself at the battle of Zieleńce was promoted to the rank of Lieutenant General. In the aftermath of the battle of Zieleńce, Mokronowski became the fourth person to receive the Virtuti Militari order, after prince Józef Poniatowski, Tadeusz Kościuszko and Michał Wielhorski.

=== Kościuszko Uprising ===
In 1794, he was the commander of Polish troops in Warsaw, and took part in the Warsaw Uprising against the Russian garrison occupying the city. The Russians were defeated in two days, and retreated from the city with very heavy losses. During the insurrection he held the position of commander of the city of Warsaw and the National Forces of the Masovian Duchy (komendant miasta Warszawy i Siły Zbrojnej Księstwa Mazowieckiego). He was elected to the Provisional Temporary Council (Polish: Rada Zastępcza Tymczasowa), but due to his criticism of Tadeusz Kościuszko he was removed from the political body. As a military commander, he was important in the defense of Warsaw (commander of the defense at the battle of Błonie), and in Lithuania, where he led the retreating Commonwealth forces towards Warsaw. Together with prince Józef Poniatowski, Michał Wielhorski and Eustachy Sanguszko, he formed the core of the "court" faction among the insurrectionists.

After the defeat of the Uprising, he retired to Italy.

== Congress Poland ==
He returned to Poland shortly before his death. He was engaged in the construction of the monument of Józef Poniatowski in Warsaw.

== Personal life ==
=== Family ===
In 1793, he married Maria Marianna Sanguszko-Kowelska. In 1804 his daughter, Antonina Mokronowski, was born.

== See also ==
- Andrzej Mokronowski
