= Battle of Dubienka =

Battle of the Polish-Russian war of 1792

Coordinates: 51.077813°N 23.866153°E

- Part of Polish-Russian War of 1792
| Date | 18 July 1792 |
| Location | Dubienka east of Lublin, Poland |
| Result | See § Closure |

Belligerents
| Poland–Lithuania | Russian Empire |

Commanders and leaders
| Tadeusz Kościuszko; Józef Poniatowski | Mikhail Kakhovsky |

Strength
| 5,300 to 7,000–8,000; less than 10 cannons | 25,000 and 56 cannons |

Casualties and losses
| 900; 7 guns | 500–4,000 |

The Battle of Dubienka occurred during the Polish–Russian War of 1792 (War of the Second Partition of Poland) where on July 18, 1792, the Polish army under the command of General Tadeusz Kościuszko defended the Bug River crossing against the Russian army under General Mikhail Kakhovsky. Although the Russians had a numerical advantage of 5:1 over the Polish defenders, some of their attacks were stymied by field fortifications raised by the Poles. Subsequent Russian assault and flanking forced the Poles to retreat to avoid being encircled. After the Polish-Lithuanian forces left their forward positions, the Russian army occupied the area.

== Background ==
When the Russian army invaded Poland in May 1792, they had a nearly 3:1 numerical advantage, forcing the Polish forces to retreat. General Tadeusz Kościuszko has been tasked with commanding the rear guard and delaying the Russian advance. The Bug river was the last natural obstacle before the Russian army and the Polish capital of Warsaw, about 250 kilometres (160 mi) away. Kościuszko had been tasked by the Polish commander-in-chief, Prince Józef Poniatowski, with stopping a much larger Russian army attempting to cross the river near the village of Dubienka.

== Opposing forces ==
Kościuszko had about 5,300 forces under his command (or 7,000–8,000), while Russian general Mikhail Kakhovsky had about 25,000. Kakhovsky had also an advantage with artillery, commanding 56 cannons to Kościuszko's fewer than 10 pieces.

== Battle ==
Kościuszko, an experienced engineer who had only recently designed the fortifications of West Point in the United States, had to secure the Bug at about 50 kilometres (31 mi) of its length, on one end touching the Austrian border. He chose an advantageous position, protected by dense forests and swamps, and ordered construction of field fortifications, underwater traps, as well as burning of a nearby bridge. He put artillery batteries, flèche and sconces.

Around 15:00 on 18 July the Russians reached the river and attempted to cross it in small boats near the burned bridge, while another part of their forces crossed in the north. The initial Russian attack got bogged down in difficult terrain, and they took heavy casualties from the Polish artillery, while their own was less effective shelling the Polish fortified positions, however, there was enough of it to suppress the fire of those few guns. General Vasily Krasno-Milashevich, who commanded infantry of the left wing, sent 5 companies of grenadiers against sconces; the grenadiers, having made their way through swamp, took three sconces, and almost at the same time Phanagorians overcame the Polish left wing and captured all their fortifications at Uchanka. Thus the left wing and the center were shaken. A Russian cavalry unit (Elizabethgrad Horse Jaegers) made it to the right-wing Polish artillery emplacements but was pushed back with the help of the fresh cavalry of Stanisław Wielowiejski, and their commanding colonel Yevstafy Palmenbach was killed. After five hours of repeated assaults, the Russians retreated.

=== Closure ===
The Russians withdrew from right-wing positions thanks to Wielowiejski. But despite the losses, other areas were substantially in their hands. They left about 4,000 dead, as reported by a Polish source. As per Russian source, Kakhovsky lost 500 men and 640 horses. The Poles took about 900 casualties, mostly from the Russian artillery fire as per Polish source.

More and more Russian units were brought into combat. The subsequent events of the battle are described in a Russian source in this way:

"Soon after, the Russians gathered behind the Kharkov light cavalry squadrons that had met the Poles and again rushed forward. Meanwhile, Russian infantry, which continued its advance, captured all fortifications and the camp. The twilight forest behind the Polish position facilitated their retreat; on Russian side the pursuit lasted for about 1.3 miles (2.1 km) – it was carried out by 2 battalions of Saltykov's jaegers and by 3 regiments of Orlov's Cossacks who targeted toward Austrian border – and ended at night. The victors settled down for the night near Uchanka."

A Polish source describes next moves as follows:

"After nightfall, Polish scouts reported Russians crossing to the south, through neutral Austrian territory. As the Poles were running low on supplies, Kościuszko decided that his army could not withstand a prolonged siege, and ordered a retreat towards Chełm to avoid being encircled."

== Aftermath ==
While Kościuszko was criticized for retreating by some officers, he was rewarded by king Stanisław August Poniatowski with a Virtuti Militari order. He was also praised by his opponent, General Mikhail Kakhovsky, who in his official report noted that this was the most difficult battle of the campaign so far. One week after this battle Poland capitulated.
