= Pyotr Krechetnikov =

Russian major-general

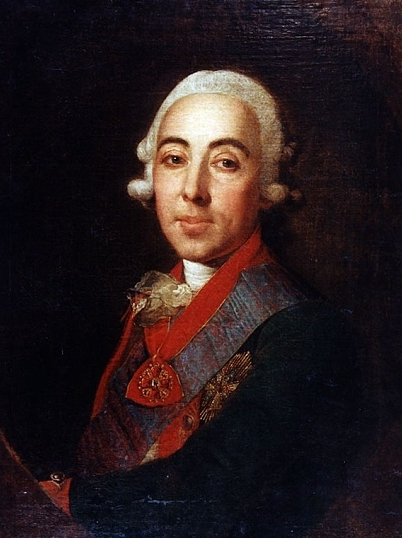
Piotr Nikititch Kretchetnikov

Piotr Nikititch Kretchetnikov (Russian: Петр Никитич Кречетников) (1727 – c. 1800) was a Russian major-general in command of the corps sent to intervene against the Bar Confederation. He was the elder brother of Mikhaïl Kretchetnikov.

He was made a colonel in 1764 and in 1769 he entered the Imperial Russian Army at the head of troops sent against the armies of a Polish uprising. He was accused of several abuses as commander and of the confiscation of goods belonging to active members of the Bar Confederation. He was also accused of fraud in resupplying his troops and was dismissed in 1771. From 1771 to 1775 he was governor of the city of Astrakhan.
