= Studzianka, Lublin Voivodeship =

Studzianka
- Village
- Location within Poland
- Coordinates: 51°56′N 23°13′E
- Country: Poland
- Voivodeship: Lublin
- County: Biała
- Gmina: Łomazy

Studzianka [stuˈd͡ʑaŋka] is a village in the administrative district of Gmina Łomazy, within Biała County, Lublin Voivodeship, in eastern Poland.

== History ==
Studzianka was established as a Tatar settlement as per the 1679 privileges granted by King John III Sobieski. The famous Colonel Aleksander Ułan (d.1740) lived here and the town derives its name from the formation of the light cavalry - Lancers.

In 1817 a wooden mosque was built in the village but this was burned down by the Cossacks in 1915. By the nineteenth century only 20 Polish tatar families lived in the village and many left the region for economic reasons. The last Imam was Maciej Bajrulewicz. The village still maintains a Mizar (Muslim cemetery).

In 2005 the first annual festival was held here to commemorate the village Tartar heritage.
