= Józef Judycki =

Polish–Lithuanian noble and military commander (d. 1797)

Józef Judycki (died 1797) was a Polish–Lithuanian Commonwealth noble. Marshal of the Lithuanian Tribunal in 1777, Lithuanian Great Guard (strażnik wielki litewski) from 1776, Lithuanian Great Quartermaster (oboźny wielki litewski) from 1774. Commander of Lithuanian army during the Polish–Russian War of 1792. Defeated at the Battle of Mir in June 1792, he gained a reputation as a poor commander and was relieved soon afterwards.
