= Battle of Błonie (1794) =

1794 battle of the Kościuszko Uprising

- Part of the Kościuszko Uprising
Date	10 July 1794
Location	Błonie, Polish–Lithuanian Commonwealth (now part of Poland) 52°11′42″N 20°37′04″E
Result	Polish–Lithuanian victory

Belligerents
Polish–Lithuanian Commonwealth (Kościuszko's insurrectionists)	Kingdom of Prussia

Commanders and leaders
Stanisław Mokronowski	Unknown

Units involved
Tadeusz Kościuszko's army	Prussian Army

The Battle of Błonie (Polish pronunciation: [ˈbwɔ.ɲɛ]; Polish: Bitwa pod Błoniem; German: Schlacht von Błonie) was fought on 10 July 1794, during the Kościuszko Uprising, near the town of Błonie, near the city of Warsaw, then a part of the Polish–Lithuanian Commonwealth, and now located within Poland. It was fought by the Polish–Lithuanian insurrectionist forces led by Stanisław Mokronowski againt the Prussian Army of the Kingdom of Prussia. The battle ended in a Polish–Lithuanian victory, with the insurrectionist managing to block and repel the Prussian advance towards Warsaw.
