= Battle of Brest (1792) =

- Part of Polish-Russian War of 1792
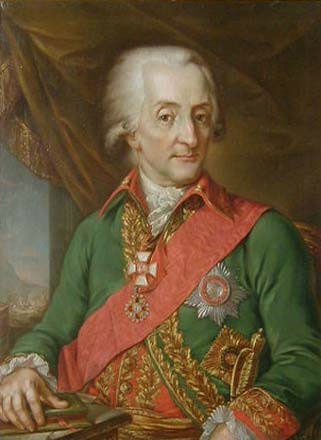
- Russian Commander Ivan Fersen
Date	23 July [O.S. 12 July] 1792
Location	Brest, Poland-Lithuania (Modern day Belarus)
Result	Russian victory

Belligerents
Russia	Polish–Lithuanian Commonwealth

Commanders and leaders
Ivan Fersen	Szymon Zabiełło

Strength
5,500	5,000

Casualties and losses
12 killed & 43 wounded	356 killed & 66 captured

The Battle of Brest (Russian: Битва под Брестом; Polish: Bitwa pod Brześciem) was defensive battle of 5,000 Polish-Lithuanian troops tried to cover the way to Warsaw from the Russians. An equally strong Russian detachment was acting against them.

On July 21, a dragoon raid took place on Polish-Lithuanian positions in front of the city, the Polish-Lithuanian forces retreated into the city itself. On July 23, a battle took place at dawn, the defenders held out for a long time, but after they ran out of ammunition they were forced to retreat. Poles were led by Szymon Zabiełło; they lost 356 killed and 66 captured, while the Russians under Ivan Yevstafyevich Fersen lost only 12 dead and 43 wounded.
