= Mikhail Krechetnikov =

Russian general (1729–1793)

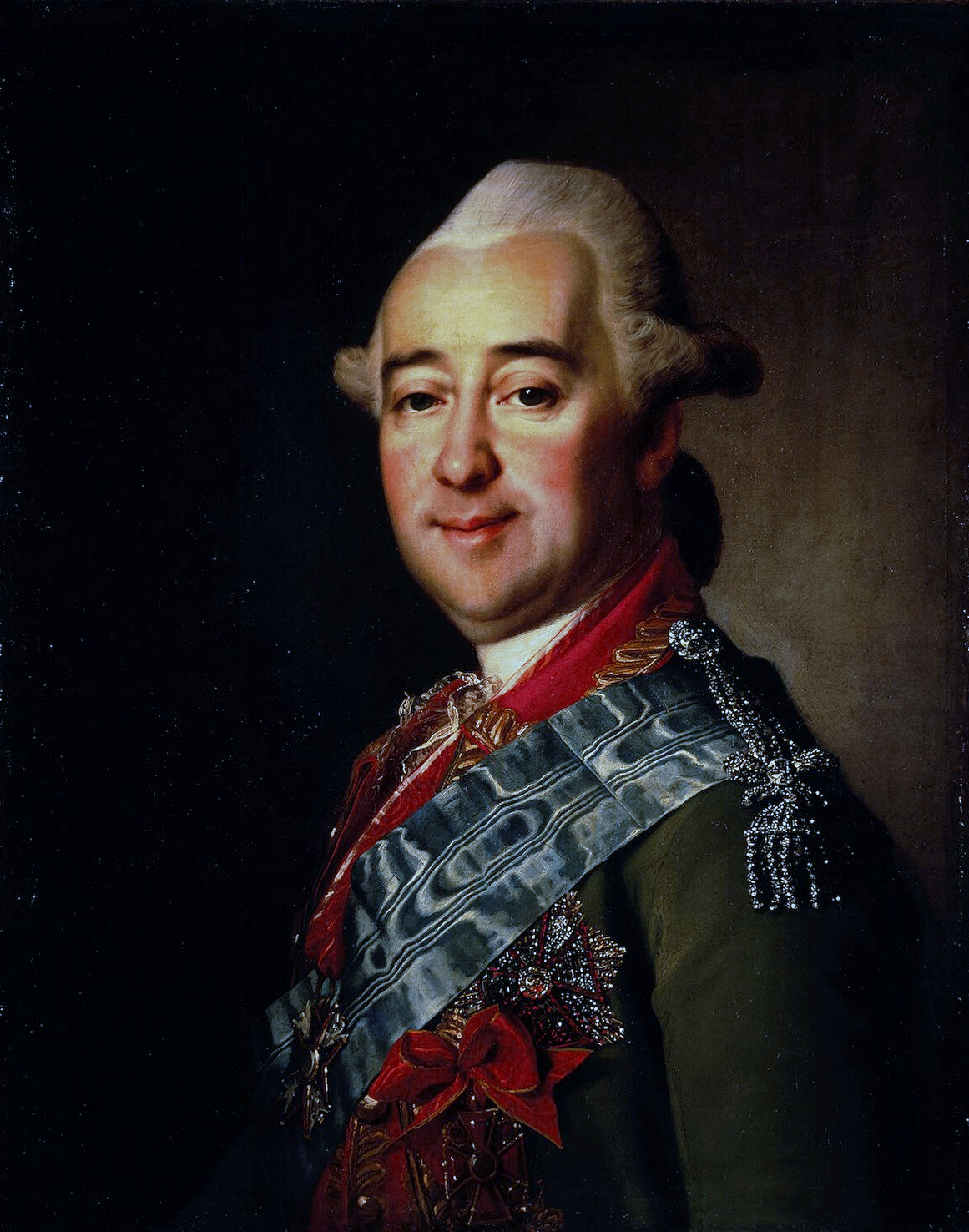
Dmitry Levitzky, Mikhaïl Krechetnikov (Hermitage Museum)

Michael N. Krechetnikov (Russian: Михаил Никитич Кречетников, romanized: Mikhail Nikitich Krechetnikov, 1729, Moscow, Russian Empire – 9 May 1793, Medzhybizh, Podolie Vice-Royalty, Russian Empire) was a Russian military commander and General of Infantry (General-in-chief). He was the younger brother of Pyotr Krechetnikov.

== Life ==
The son of Nikita Krechetnikov, a state councillor, he graduated from the Land Gentry Corps and fought with the rank of second major in the Seven Years' War. During the Russo-Turkish War he distinguished at Kagul, for which he was promoted to Major-General. He then took part in the quelling of a revolt in Ukraine (Koliyivshchyna) on the orders of Catherine II.

From July 1775 he was governor-poruchik of Tver and then from 1776 governor of Kaluga and Tula. In 1790 he was awarded the title of general-anshefa. He fought in the Polish–Russian War of 1792, commanded Russian troops in Lithuania and was appointed Governor-General of that area (then including Belarus, Lithuania, western Ukraine and part of Poland) after the First Partition of Poland, before retiring to Russia on the second partition of Poland.

== Manifest of General-in-Chief Krechetnikov ==
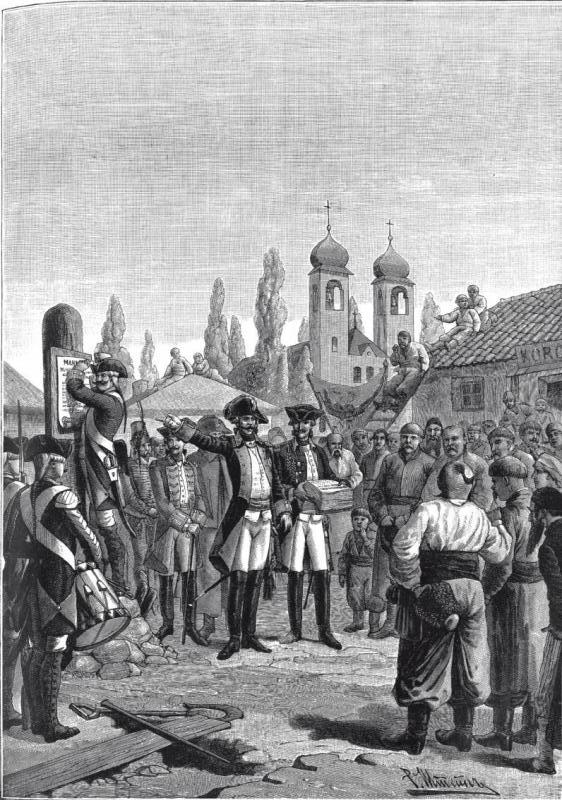
General Krechetnikov declares the manifest of Catherine the Great to Volhynians and Podolians (Partitions of Poland)

Also known as Manifest about joining of Polish oblasts (regions) to Russia in 1793 (see Second partition of Poland), it is an act by which Russian Empire pronounced its right on territories of the Right-bank Ukraine that until then was located as part of Rzeczpospolita. The manifest was announced at town of Polonne near Zwiahel (today Novohrad-Volynsky) on 7 April [O.S. 27 March] 1793.

Text of the Manifest of General-in-Chief Krechetnikov

From H.I.M. the most merciful gosudarynia (souvereign) of mine her Army General-en-Chief, senator, general-governor of Tula, Kaluga, newly joined oblasts (regions) from Polish Rzeczpospolita to Russian Empire, commanding over all troops already there located and positioned in 3 Little Russian governorates, acting in position of general-governor in those governorates, military inspector and cavalier of orders of St. Andrew the First-Called, St. Alexander Nevsky and St. Equal to the Apostles Prince Vladimir of 1st degree, Polish White Eagle and St. Stanislaus and Grand Duchy of Holstein St. Anna, I, Mikhail Krechetnikov, announce this by the highest will and behest of my the most merciful gosudarynia of All-Russian H.I.M. to all dwellers and each in particular of any rank and title today joined now from Polish Rzeczpospolita and for eternal times to Russian Empire its places and lands.

Participation of H.M. All-Russian Empress being acceptable in Polish affairs has always been based on closer, embedded and mutual benefits of both countries. That not only were in vain, but also turned in a fruitless burden and in the same way was incurring of countless losses for all her efforts to preserve rest, peace and freedom in this neighboring to her oblast (region), it is indisputably and tangibly proven by the 30-year experience. Between disorder and violence resulted from strife and disagreement constantly tormenting the Polish Republic, with special condolences H.I.M. always looked at this oppression that those lands and cities adjacent to Russian Empire and once being her former possession and her people of single heritage created and by Christian Orthodox faith enlightened until this time such practicing were proven of it. Yet today some unworthy Poles, enemies of own Homeland, are not ashamed to incite the reign of godless rebels in French Kingdom and their support so that together with them involve Poland into bloody civil strife. So much from their insolence a danger lies ahead as for the preserving Christian faith, so the very welfare of the inhabitants of the mentioned lands from introducing a new harmful teaching seeking to sever all ties civil and political, conscience, safety and property of everyone providing that mentioned enemies as haters of the common peace imitating the godless, violent and depraved crowd of French rebels try to scatter and spread it throughout whole Poland and thereby destroy forever both her own and her neighbors' peace.

== Awards ==
- Order of St. Anna - 1774, for the storming of the city of Craiova
- Order of the White Eagle - 1776
- Order of Saint Stanislaus - 1776
- Order of Alexander Nevsky - 1779

Political offices
Preceded by Pyotr Rumyantsev	Governor-General of Little Russia; 1790–1793	Succeeded by Iosif Igelström
