= Szymon Zabiełło =

Polish-Lithuanian nobleman

Castellan of Minsk
- In office 1783–1787

Personal details
- Born: 14 July 1750
- Died: 1824 (aged 73–74)

Military service
- Branch/service: Grand Ducal Lithuanian Army
- Rank: lieutenant general

Szymon Zabiełło (Lithuanian: Simonas Zabiela) was a Polish-Lithuanian nobleman (Polish: szlachcic) of the Topór clan (born 14 July 1750, Raudondvaris, Grand Duchy of Lithuania, died in 1824). He was the Castellan of Minsk from 1783 to 1787, lieutenant general of the Grand Ducal Lithuanian Army, and a member of its General Staff in 1792. He was an envoy to the Grodno Sejm, a member of the Patriotic Party, the Grodno Confederation in 1793, as well as the Permanent Council, and a participant of the Kościuszko Uprising in Lithuania.

== Family ==
The son of Antoni Zabiełło and Zofia Niemirowicz-Szczytt, the daughter of the castellan of Mstsislaw, Józef Szczytt. He was the brother of Michal Zabiello, and Józef Zabiełło, a member of the pro-Russian Targowica confederation.

== French Royal army ==
Zabiełło completed his education at the Lunéville military academy and served in the French army. In 1780 he became a knight of the Order of Saint Stanislaus.

== Polish-Lithuanian Commonwealth ==
In 1787, together with his brother Michał Zabiełło, he transferred to the Lithuanian army and was immediately promoted to brigadier of the 1st Lithuanian National Cavalry Brigade and major general of the 2nd Lithuanian Division.

=== Four-Year Sejm ===
From 1788, he was a member of the Four-Year Sejm. In 1789, Zabiełło was awarded the Order of the White Eagle. In 1790, he was promoted to the rank of Lieutenant general.

=== 1792 War ===
He fought against the Russians during the Polish-Russian war of 1792, where he was commended for his actions during the ill-fated Battle of Brześć Litewski. Despite his bravery, Zabiełło was reputed to be ignorant of the finer points of commanding an army on the field against a much larger and well-trained foe.

=== 1792 August - 1794 March ===
After king Stanisław II's surrender, Zabiełło attempted to organise a guerilla campaign in the enemy's rear, but abandoned these plans due to the sheer advantage held by the Imperial Russian Army.

Zabiełło was Vawkavysk's envoy to the Grodno Sejm in 1793, where the second partition of the Polish-Lithuanian Commonwealth was ratified. He later liaised with insurrectionist allies in Vilnius, while being a member of the Permanent Council established by the Targowica confederation.

=== Kościuszko Uprising ===
After the outbreak of the Kościuszko insurrection in Vilnius, he joined and temporarily acted as the adjutant of general Jakub Jasiński. After the collapse of the rebellion, Zabiełło withdrew from public life.
