= Mikhail Sushkov =

Russian poet and writer (1775–1792)

Mikhail Vasilyevich Sushkov (Russian: Михаил Васильевич Сушков) (1775–1792) was a young Russian nobleman and writer of a small body of prose and poetry, notable for his autobiographical suicide novel. He committed suicide by hanging at age 16 after writing four suicide notes, one of which was to his uncle Alexander Khrapovitsky, at that moment personal secretary of empress Catherine the Great. Sushkov’s suicide notes, the report on his death by the Moscow police, and reactions by contemporaries, not only document the suicide in great detail, but give a rare close-up of a phenomenon that was seen as a highly significant ‘sign of the time’.

Sushkov is the author of the short epistolary novel The Russian Werther (published posthumously in 1801) in which the main character commits suicide. The death of Sushkov's hero is regarded an example of the so-called Werther effect, the wave of copycat suicides following the literary success of Goethe's The Sorrows of Young Werther (1774). However, unlike its German namesake, the Russian Werther is plagued by boredom. In this respect Sushkov’s novel is significant, as his character precurses the literary heroes of Russian romanticism, like Pushkin's Eugene Onegin and Lermontov's Pechorin.
