= Aleksander Ułan =

- Born: 1670
- Died: 1738 (aged 67–68)
- Commands: 4th Lithuanian Vanguard Regiment
- Spouse: Marianna née Achmatowicz
- Children: Stefan; Józef

Aleksander Ułan (1670–1738) was a Lithuanian Tatar officer, who served as part of the Royal Saxon Army. It has been suggested that the name Uhlan derives from his surname.

== Early life ==
He was from Ašmena district.

== Military career ==
During the Polish Civil War, Aleksander Ułan sided with King Augustus II the Strong. As a reward for his loyalty, Ułan was given the Koszoły village in 1711. In 1713, rotmistrz Ułan was promoted to colonel and given command of a Lithuanian Tatar regiment. In 1715-1716, he and his regiment fought on King Augustus II's side against the Tarnogród confederates.

=== Service in Saxon army ===
In 1717 the regiment was transferred to Saxon pay. The regiment's nominal commander was General Joachim Friedrich von Flemming. According to Stanisław Dziadulewicz, Ułan's regiment was called "Court's Tatar Regiment" (Polish: pułku tatarskiego nadwornego). The regiment was composed of eight banners, totaling around 400 soldiers.

In 1734, Aleksander Ułan commanded the 4th Lithuanian Vanguard Regiment.
