= Battle of Zieleńce =

Battle of the 1792 Polish–Russian War

Coordinates: 49.5300°N 26.8700°E

- Part of the Polish–Russian War of 1792
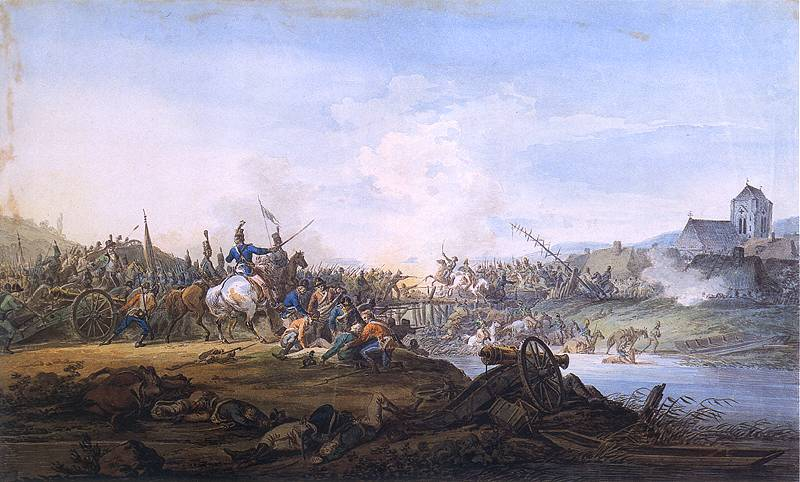
- Battle of Zieleńce by Aleksander Orłowski
Date	18 June 1792
Location	Zieleńce, Poland (now Ukraine)
Result	Polish-Lithuanian victory

Belligerents
Poland–Lithuania	Russian Empire

Commanders and leaders
Prince Józef Poniatowski	Irakly Morkov

Strength
15,357 and 12 cannons	11,000 and 24 cannons

Casualties and losses
800–1,000	730–2,000

The Battle of Zieleńce was a battle in the Polish–Russian War of 1792, in defence of the Polish Constitution of 3 May 1791. The battle took place on 18 June 1792, between the Polish–Lithuanian Commonwealth Army of Józef Poniatowski and an Imperial Russian Army group under the command of General Irakly Morkov, which was a part of General Mikhail Krechetnikov's Russian forces invading the Polish–Lithuanian Commonwealth from the south. The battle ended in Polish victory, as the Russian assault was repulsed, although the Poles soon withdrew from the battlefield.

== Prelude ==
Polish forces had been retreating for several weeks, avoiding a decisive engagement with the numerically superior Russian forces.

On 15 June, the combined Polish forces reached Połonne. After a meeting, the Polish commanders decided to withdraw because they did not have the possibility of defending a town that did not have fortifications. On 17 June, Polish commander Prince Józef Poniatowski received information in Szepietówka that the Lubomirski division was now camped in Zasław. He ordered the Lubomirski division to join his forces near Zieleńce. Lubomirski had about 2,000 infantry and 1,000 cavalry, including units of general Józef Zajączek and Ludwik Trokin. His formation secured a hill situated on the north of the road from Połonne to Zasław which dominated the area. Infantry taking position in centre wings were secured by cavalry. In the early morning of 18 June, a Russian group under the command of General Irakly Morkov was observed. This group was front watch of larger corps of General Mikhail Golenishchev-Kutuzov. The order of this group was to attack the Polish army left wing and destroy the rest of train. With a force of about 10,500–11,500 soldiers and 24 cannons (2 infantry regiments of about 6,000 soldiers, three regiments of line cavalry of 2,500 soldiers, and a Cossack brigade under command of Orlov), the Russian formations took positions in a valley below a hill. Their order of battle was the same as Polish, except that one battalion was a reserve and the second to secure the train. Meanwhile, General Zajączek contacted Poniatowski for help.

== Battle ==
=== Opening moves ===
The battle began with artillery fire and cavalry clashes. About 7 a.m., Markow wanted to begin to attack but changed his orders when he saw that Polish formations under Poniatowski had moved onto the battlefield. Poniatowski's forces included two infantry battalions, a cavalry regiment of front guard from Prince Józef Lubomirski, Brigade National Cavalry under the command of Stanisław Mokronowski, a division commanded by General Wielhorski, and 12 cannons. Kościuszko with his division had to stay in the rear in order to prevent an attack from Levanidov and Dunin corps. Poniatowski sent the Mokronowski brigade on right wing. He backed the artillery. The battalion of infantry regiment of Potocki was in reserve. The division of Wielhorski took position within the forest as second throw.

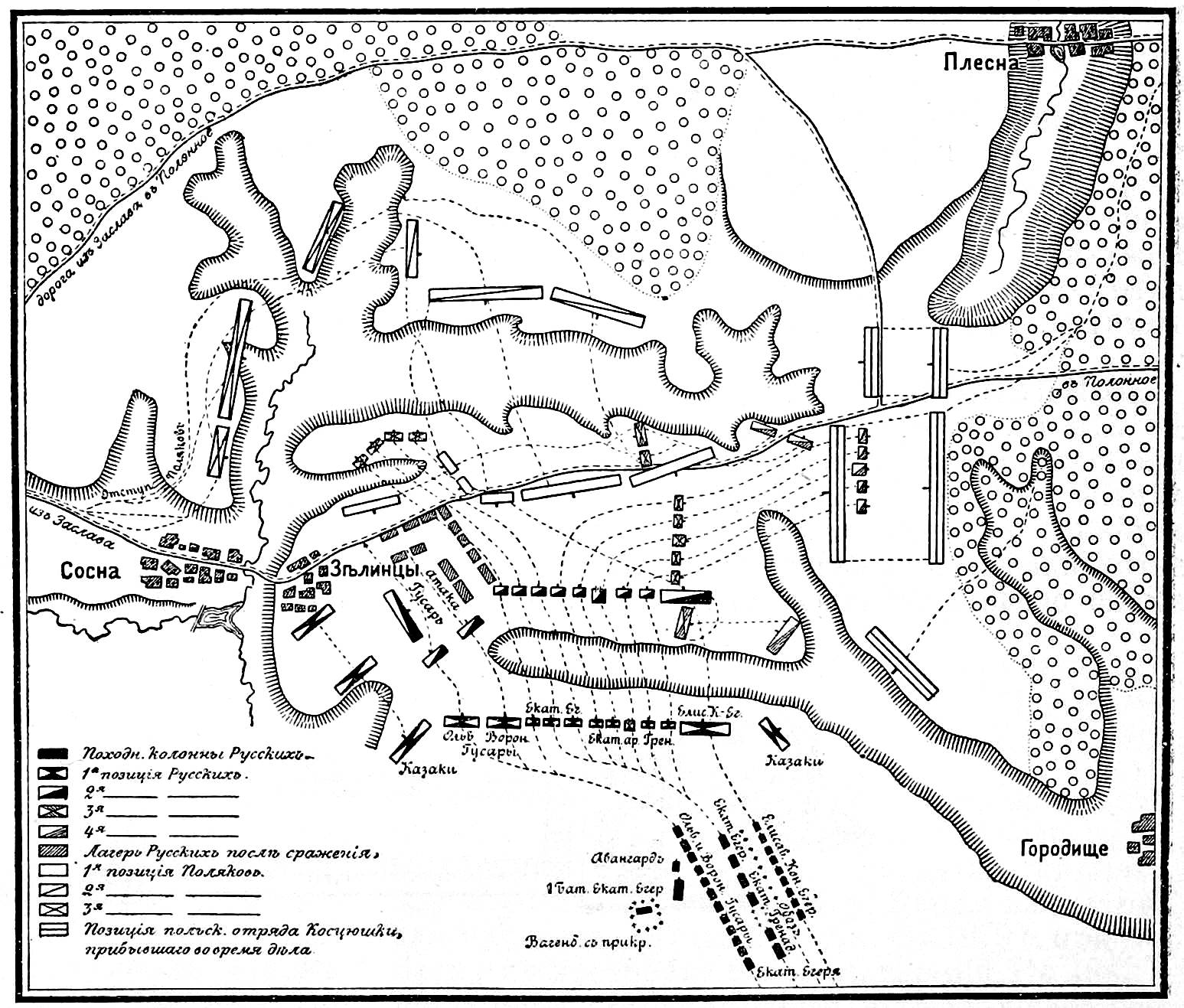
Battle of Zieleńce

=== Russian advance ===
After a few hours, the Polish and Russian artillery fell silent. Within 12 hours with Russian-backed artillery fire, the infantry began advancing onto the Polish centre. Under mass artillery fire and a Russian attack, panic was induced among the Polish recruits who began escaping. After some time, Józef Poniatowski reviewed the Polish position. He organised a new battalion from the Potocki regiment and with support of battalion ordnance Ostrogoski began a counterattack. Russian infantry under fire of artillery and a Polish counterattack began withdrawal incurring heavy losses. Meanwhile, another Russian infantry unit secured the village of Zieleńce and opened fire on Polish formations. Poniatowski sent a formation of cavalry, but failed. After the village was set on fire, the Russians withdrew. Meanwhile, the Russians moved artillery fire onto Polish right wing on cavalry. The soldiers felt panic. At that moment, Cossacks began a charge. Initially, that charge was stopped by field squadrons of Mokronowski brigade cavalry, but in formation of Regiment Buławy Koronnej panic ensued the rear squadrons of Mokronowski brigade. The panic of the Polish cavalry was stopped by Sanguszko and other officers. After reorganisation, Polish cavalry with support of part Lubowidzki cavalry brigade from second line began a countercharge. During this charge, the Polish cavalry destroyed the Russian cavalry and began to rally. Poniatowski sent an order to support the rally to Czapski commander of second line cavalry right wing. Czapski refused to obey because the order was not written. In truth of the matter of his decision was that he was follower of the pro-Russian Targowica Confederation. During this time, a Russian regiment of grenadiers from Ekatierinoslav attacked Polish left wing. Poniatowski sent battalions from Potocki and Malczewski regiments. After decimating grenadiers under artillery and rifle fire, the Russians advance collapsed.

=== Polish advance ===
After collapsing the Russian advance, Poniatowski organised an attack group from division Wielhorski units. This group contained three infantry battalions from regiments Potocki, Malczewski and ordnance ostrogocka, Brigade National Cavalry under command of Dzierżek, and regiment front watch under command of Józef Lubomirski. The group had to attack the Russian right wing. Morkov, who watched the preparations, concentrated most of his formation against the group. Polish cavalry successfully fought the Russian cavalry and forced them to withdrawal. But when Wielhorski met the enemy infantry, he stopped the advance because his infantry was weaker than the Russians and inexperienced. About 5 p.m. Morkov, who did not get relief from Kutuzov, withdrew.

== Aftermath ==
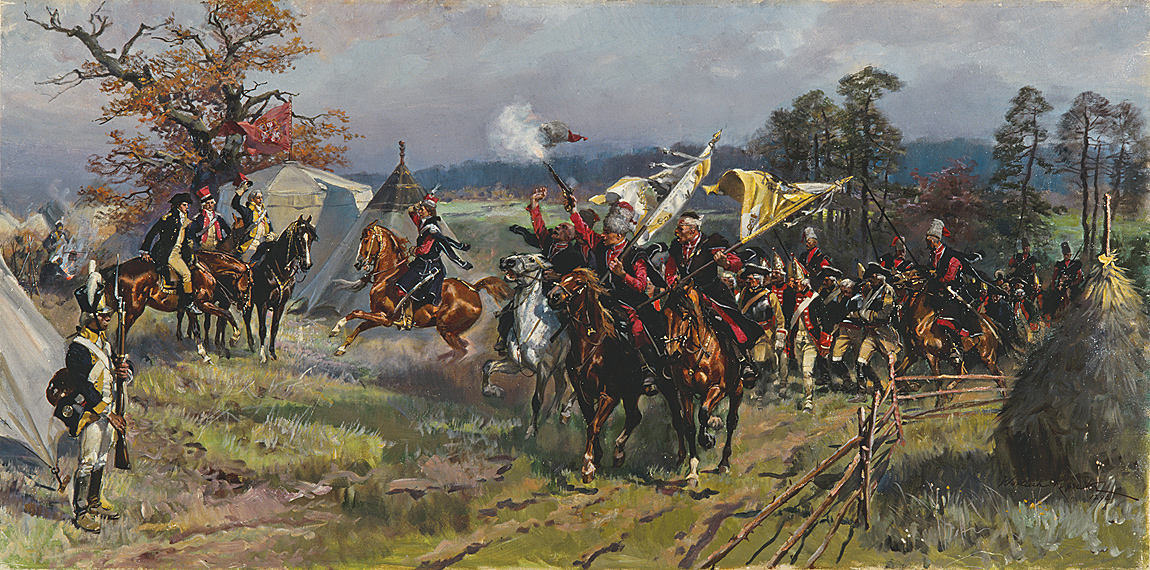
After the battle of Zieleńce 1792, by Wojciech Kossak

The victorious Polish army stayed on battlefield until evening and, thereafter, withdrew to Zasław. It was a tactical victory, without much strategic implications. Polish losses were significant; soldiers lacked ammunition and food; Derdej compares it to a Pyrrhic victory. After Polish withdrawal, Morkov moved onto the battlefield and announced himself the victor. Nonetheless, modern historians classify this battle as a Polish victory.

The Russians nonetheless sustained heavier losses, and were significantly delayed in their pursuit of the Polish forces. The captured Russian banner was sent to Warsaw. To commemorate this victory, Polish king Stanisław II Augustus created the order of Virtuti Militari and awarded it to a number of Polish commanders participating in that battle.

Some contemporary Polish leaders, like Kościuszko and Zajączek, felt that Poniatowski should have pursued the Russians more aggressively, but Derdej justifies his decision noting the exhaustion and low supplies of Polish forces.

The Battle of Zieleńce is commemorated on the Tomb of the Unknown Soldier (Warsaw), with the inscription "ZIELEŃCE 18 VI 1792".

== Bibliography ==
- Piotr Derdej (2008). Zieleńce - Mir - Dubienka 1792. Bellona. ISBN 978-83-11-11039-7.
- Jadwiga Nadzieja (1988). Od Jakobina do księcia namiestnika. Wydawnictwo "Śląsk". ISBN 978-83-216-0682-8.
- Alex Storozynski (28 April 2009). The Peasant Prince: and the Age of Revolution. St. Martin's Press. p. 165. ISBN 978-0-312-62594-8.
- Velichko, Konstantin; Novitsky, Vasily; Schwarz, Alexey von; Apushkin, Vladimir; Schulz, Gustav von (1912). Sytin Military Encyclopedia (in Russian). Vol. X: "Елисавета Петровна – Инициатива". Moscow: Типография Т-ва И. Д. Сытина.
