= Jakub Jasiński =

Polish general and poet (1761–1794)

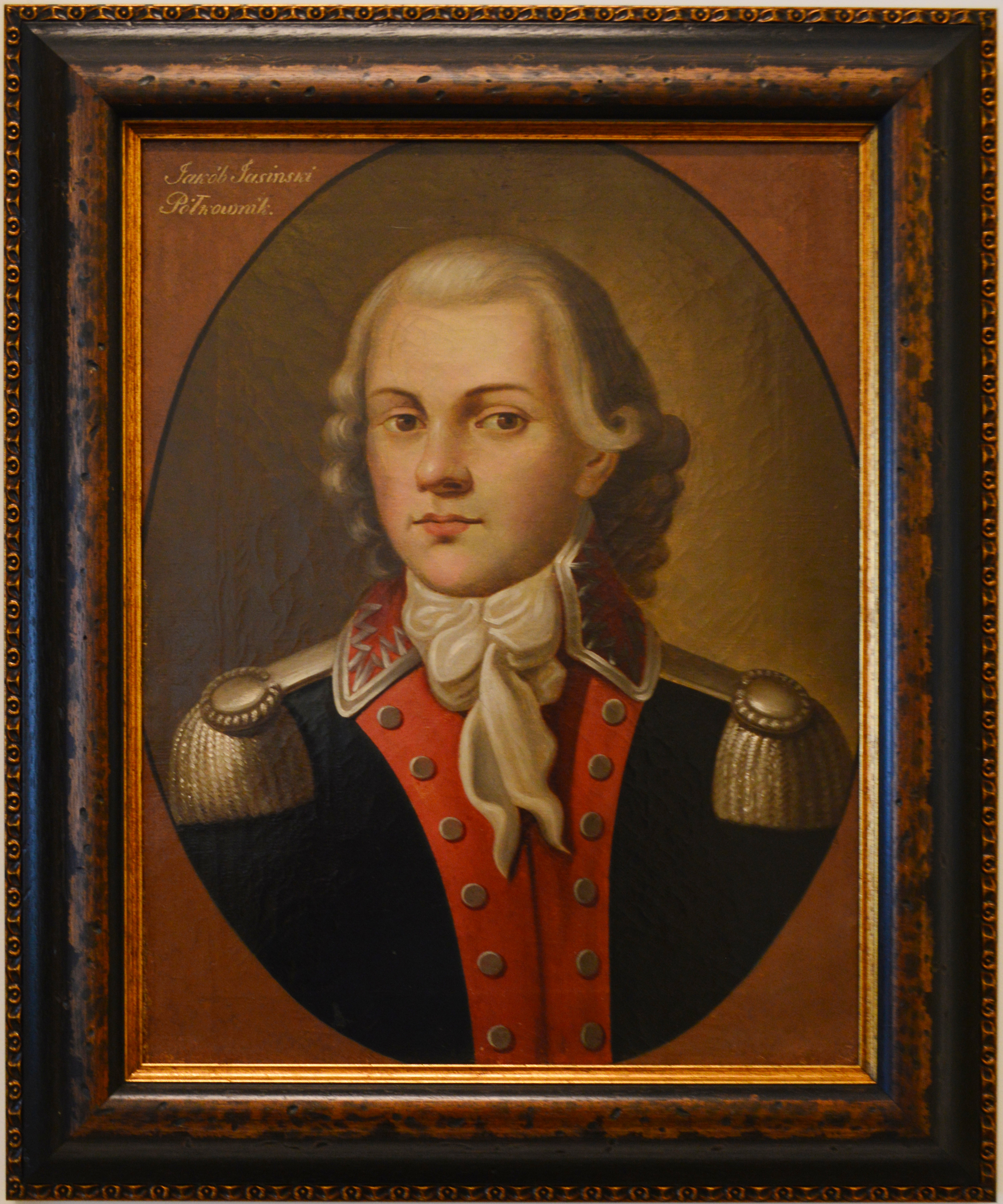
- Native name: Jokūbas Kristupas Jasinskis
- Born: 24 July 1761; Węglew, Greater Poland, Polish–Lithuanian Commonwealth
- Died: 4 November 1794 (aged 33) Praga, Warsaw, Polish–Lithuanian Commonwealth
- Allegiance: Polish–Lithuanian Commonwealth
- Service years: 1783–1794
- Rank: Lieutenant General
- Conflicts: Polish–Russian War of 1792; Kościuszko Uprising; Battle of Praga
- Awards: Virtuti Militari
- Education: Corps of Cadets

Jakub Krzysztof Jasiński of Rawicz coat of arms (Lithuanian: Jokūbas Kristupas Jasinskis; 24 July 1761 – 4 November 1794) was a Polish–Lithuanian general, and poet of Enlightenment. He participated in the War in Defence of the Constitution in 1792, was an enemy of the Targowica Confederation and organized an action against its supporters in Vilnius. He participated also in the Kościuszko Uprising, during the course of which he was killed in the Battle of Praga in 1794.

A graduate of the Warsaw-based Corps of Cadets, with time he became the tutor of engineering at his alma mater. He fought with distinction in the War in Defense of the Constitution of 1792. After the king joined the Targowica Confederation he remained loyal to the new authorities. In 1789 he became the commanding officer of the Engineering Corps for Lithuania.

== War in Defence of the Constitution ==
He participated in the Battle of Brześć in July 1792, for which he was awarded the military award Virtuti Militari.

Despite his antipathy towards the Confederation of Targowica, opposed the Constitution of 3 May which Jasiński had defended, during this time he pledged his loyalty to it, not giving up conspiratorial activities against it.

== The war of liberation ==
During the Kościuszko Uprising of 1794 Jasiński was among the most prominent members of the radical wing of the Polish Jacobins and at the same time a successful military commander of partisan forces in the area of the Grand Duchy of Lithuania. In April of that year he liberated the city of Vilnius by leading a successful uprising there. Supported by Tadeusz Kościuszko and appointed the commander in chief of all the partisan forces in the former Grand Duchy, he managed to defeat numerous Russian garrisons in the area. However, accusations of radical republicanism brought him into conflict with the state authorities, and by the beginning of June he was forced to resign as commander-in-chief of Lithuanian forces and pass his office to General Michał Wielhorski. Jakub Jasiński continued to harass enemy forces in Lithuania and then withdrew with a small partisan troop towards Warsaw. There he perished in November during the defense of Warsaw against the forces of Alexander Suvorov.

Among his literary works are numerous poems of satirical and fabled character, under huge influence of Voltaire, for example Jasiński's better-known "Sprzeczki" (Quarrels). He was also an author of many patriotic and revolutionary poems and songs against injustices, inspired by the French Revolution, and arousing hope of a similar one in his homeland.

== Commemoration ==
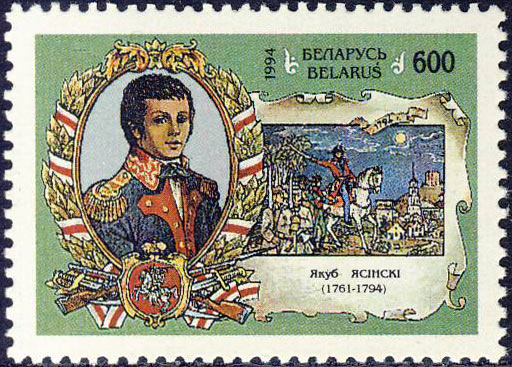
Belarusian stamp from 1994 showing Jakub Jasiński

In Poland, there are or were a number of streets named after Jakub Jasiński, including in Warsaw, Chorzów, Częstochowa, Gliwice, Inowrocław, Kraków, Lublin, Łódź, Przemyśl, Radom, Świdnica, and Zielona Góra.

Outside Poland, he is also commemorated in the names of Streets in Belarus, where there is a street named after him in Maladzyechna as well in Lithuania, where he has a street both in the Old Town of Vilnius and in Kaunas. Belarus also released a stamp with his image in 1994.
