= Yuri Vladimirovich Dolgorukov =

Anshef general, author of military memoirs, Moscow military governor in 1797

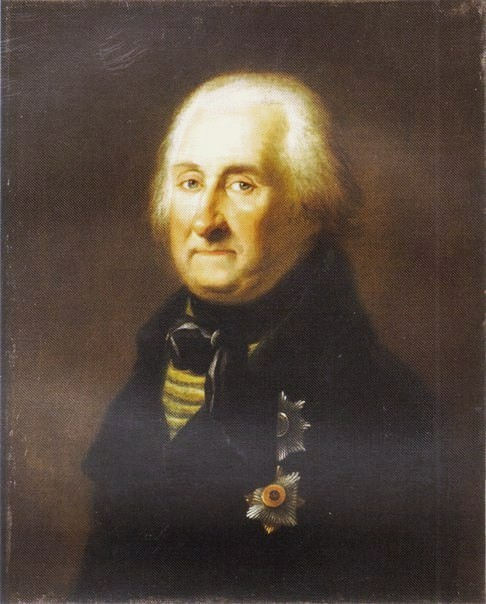
Dolgorukov when he was older

Prince Prince Yuri Dolgorukov (Russian: Князь Юрий Долгуроков; November 2 (13) 1740 – 8 (20) November 1830) was a Russian general in chief and military governor of Moscow from May to November 1797, as well as the author of a set of military memoirs.

== Life ==
He was the son of the future governor of Riga prince Vladimir Petrovich (1699-1761) and Elena Vasilievna, née Princess Hilkova (died 1763). He entered military service in 1749 and fought in the Seven Years' War from 1756 to 1763, being wounded twice. He then fought in the Russo-Turkish War (1768-1774) and the Russo-Turkish War (1787-1792), serving at the battles of Gross-Jegersdorf, Cesme and Ochakov among others. Catherine II of Russia put him in command of a detachment sent in 1763 to support Stanisław August Poniatowski, a candidate for the throne of Poland. Later, he was sent by Empress Catherine on a Russian mission to Montenegro when Šćepan Mali appeared on the scene claiming to be Peter III of Russia who died 1762. On 21 April 1773, he became a lieutenant general, in 1787 a lieutenant colonel. He defeated Ottoman troops near Chisinau in 1789 and retired from 1790 to 1793 before commanding a division in Moscow from 1794 to 1795. That post ended in resignation after friction with Platon Zubov.

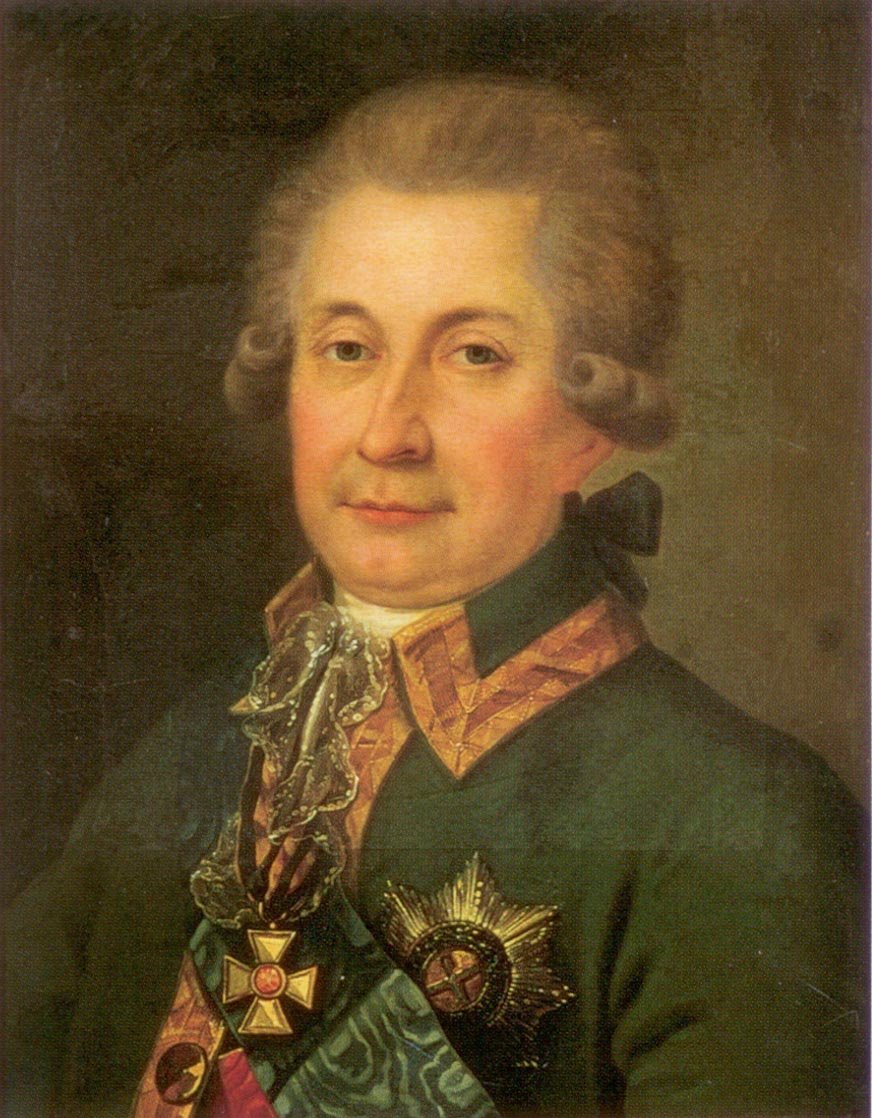
Dolgorukov, c. 1780s

Under Paul I of Russia he was military governor-general of Moscow and commander of the Astrakhan Grenadier Regiment. From 1798 until his final retirement in 1799 he was also a member of the Council at the High Court. After retirement he lived in a large lost house on the Bolshaya Nikitskaya and on his Moscow estate at Petrovskoe-Razumovskoye. He died during a cholera epidemic just after his 90th birthday, surviving all his relatives. He was buried next to his wife in the lower church of the Nikolsko-Arkhangelsk church, near the icon of St. Nicholas the Wonderworker (Saltykovka microdistrict, Balashikha).
