= Mikhail Kakhovsky =

Russian general (1734–1800)

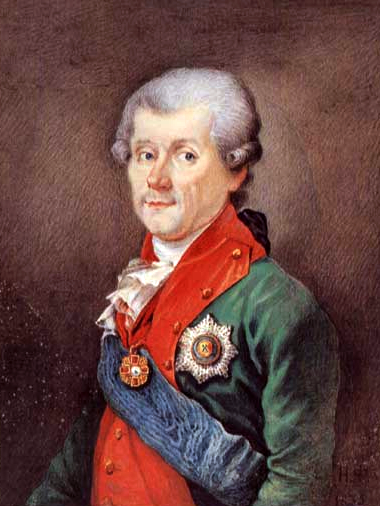
Portrait, 18th century

Count Mikhail Vasilyevich Kakhovsky (Russian: Михаи́л Васи́льевич Кахо́вский; 1734–1800) was a senior Russian general who led the imperial army to a rapid victory in the Polish–Russian War of 1792. This victory precipitated the Second Partition of Poland and brought Kakhovsky the Order of St. Andrew.

Kakhovsky also took part in many other wars waged by Catherine the Great, including the first and second wars against Turks. After the First Partition of Poland he was put in charge of the Mogilev Governorate. Later in life he served as Governor General of Nizhny Novgorod and Penza.

== Sources ==
- "Каховский, Михаил Васильевич" . Brockhaus and Efron Encyclopedic Dictionary (in Russian). 1906.
