= Polish–Russian War of 1792 =

War between the Polish–Lithuanian Commonwealth and the Russian Empire

- Part of the Polish–Russian Wars
- Polish–Russian War of 1792
Date	18 May – 27 July 1792 (2 months and 9 days)
Location	Central and eastern parts of the Polish–Lithuanian Commonwealth
Result	Russian victory
Territorial changes	Second Partition of Poland

Belligerents
Russian Empire (Polish–Lithuanian Commonwealth) Targowica Confederates	Poland–Lithuania

Commanders and leaders
(Russian Empire) Catherine the Great; (Russian Empire) Mikhail Krechetnikov; (Russian Empire) Mikhail Kakhovsky; (Russian Empire) Wilhelm Derfelden; (Russian Empire) Ivan Fersen; (Russian Empire) Mikhail Kutuzov; (Russian Empire) Yuri Dolgorukov; (Russian Empire) Nikolay Raevsky; (Russian Empire) Boris Mellin; (Russian Empire) Irakly Morkov; (Russian Empire) Fiodor Denisow; (Polish–Lithuanian Commonwealth) Stanisław Potocki	Stanisław Poniatowski; Józef Poniatowski; Tadeusz Kościuszko; Michał Wielhorski; Józef Judycki; Stanisław Mokronowski; Szymon Zabiełło; Józef Bielak; Michał Zabiełło; Michał Kirkor

Units involved
Imperial Russian Army	Crown Army; Lithuanian Army

Strength
98,000 men	70,000 men

Casualties and losses
Total: 6,632; 3,293 killed 3,339 wounded	Total: 3,108; 1,816 killed 1,060 wounded 216 captured 16 guns

The Polish–Russian War of 1792 (also, War of the Second Partition, and in Polish sources, War in Defence of the Constitution (Note: Polish: Wojna w obronie Konstytucji 3 maja)) was fought between the Polish–Lithuanian Commonwealth on one side, and the Targowica Confederation (conservative nobility of the Commonwealth opposed to the new Constitution of 3 May 1791) and the Russian Empire under Catherine the Great on the other.

The war took place in two theaters: a northern in Lithuania and a southern in what is now Ukraine. In both, the Polish forces retreated before the numerically superior Russian forces, though they offered significantly more resistance in the south, thanks to the effective leadership of Polish commanders Prince Józef Poniatowski and Tadeusz Kościuszko. During the three-month-long struggle several battles were fought, but no side scored a decisive victory. The largest success of the Polish forces was the defeat of one of the Russian formations at the Battle of Zieleńce on 18 June; in the aftermath of the battle the Polish highest military award, Virtuti Militari, was established. The Russians' greatest success in this war was the Battle of Mir on 11 June (O.S. 31 May). The war ended when the Polish King Stanisław August Poniatowski decided to seek a diplomatic solution, asked for a ceasefire with the Russians and joined the Targowica Confederation, as demanded by the Russian Empire.

== Background ==
=== Decline of the Commonwealth ===
By the early 18th century, the magnates of Poland and Lithuania controlled the state – or rather, they managed to ensure that no reforms would be carried out that might weaken their privileged status (the "Golden Liberty"). Through the abuse of the liberum veto rule which enabled any deputy to paralyze the Sejm (Commonwealth's parliament) proceedings, deputies bribed by magnates or foreign powers or those simply content to believe they were living in an unprecedented "Golden Age", paralysed the Commonwealth's government for over a century.

The idea of reforming the Commonwealth gained traction from the mid-17th century; it was however viewed with suspicion not only by its magnates but also by neighboring countries, which had been content with the deterioration of the Commonwealth and abhorred the thought of a resurgent and democratic power on their borders. With the Commonwealth military reduced to around 16,000, it was easy for its neighbors to intervene directly (The Imperial Russian Army numbered 300,000 troops overall; The Prussian Army and Imperial Army of the Holy Roman Emperor, 200,000 each).

=== Attempts at reform ===
A major opportunity for reform presented itself during the "Great Sejm" of 1788–92. Poland's neighbors were preoccupied with wars and unable to intervene forcibly in Polish affairs. The Russian Empire and Archduchy of Austria were engaged in hostilities with the Ottoman Empire (the Russo-Turkish War, 1787–1792 and the Austro-Turkish War, 1787–1791); the Russians also found themselves simultaneously fighting in the Russo-Swedish War, 1788–1790. A new alliance between the Polish–Lithuanian Commonwealth and Prussia seeming to provide security against Russian intervention, and on 3 May 1791 the new constitution was read and adopted to overwhelming popular support.

With the wars between Turkey and Russia and Sweden and Russia having ended, Tsarina Catherine was furious over the adoption of the document, which she believed threatened Russian influence in Poland. Russia had viewed Poland as a de facto protectorate. "The worst possible news have arrived from Warsaw: the Polish king has become almost sovereign" was the reaction of one of Russia's chief foreign policy authors, Alexander Bezborodko, when he learned of the new constitution. The Kingdom of Prussia was also strongly opposed to the new Polish constitution, and Polish diplomats received a note that the new constitution changed the Polish state so much that Prussia did not consider its obligations binding. Just like Russia, Prussia was concerned that the newly strengthened Polish state could become a threat and the Prussian Foreign Minister, Friedrich Wilhelm von Schulenburg-Kehnert, clearly and with rare candor told Poles that Prussia did not support the constitution and refused to help the Commonwealth in any form, even as a mediator, as it was not in Prussia's interest to see the Commonwealth strengthened so that it could threaten Prussia in the future. The Prussian statesman Ewald Friedrich von Hertzberg expressed the fears of European conservatives: "The Poles have given the coup de grâce to the Prussian monarchy by voting a constitution", elaborating that a strong Commonwealth would likely demand the return of the lands Prussia acquired in the First Partition.

The Constitution was not adopted without dissent in the Commonwealth itself, either. Magnates who had opposed the constitution draft from the start, namely Franciszek Ksawery Branicki, Stanisław Szczęsny Potocki, Seweryn Rzewuski, and Szymon and Józef Kossakowski, asked Tsarina Catherine to intervene and restore their privileges such as the Russian-guaranteed Cardinal Laws abolished under the new statute. To that end these magnates formed the Targowica Confederation. The Confederation's proclamation, prepared in Saint Petersburg in January 1792, criticized the constitution for contributing to, in their own words, "contagion of democratic ideas" following "the fatal examples set in Paris". It asserted that "The parliament ... has broken all fundamental laws, swept away all liberties of the gentry and on the third of May 1791 turned into a revolution and a conspiracy." The Confederates declared an intention to overcome this revolution. We "can do nothing but turn trustingly to Tsarina Catherine, a distinguished and fair empress, our neighboring friend and ally", who "respects the nation's need for well-being and always offers it a helping hand", they wrote. The Confederates aligned with Tsarina Catherine and asked her for military intervention. On 18 May 1792, the Russian ambassador to Poland, Yakov Bulgakov, delivered a declaration of war to the Polish Foreign Minister Joachim Chreptowicz. Russian armies entered Poland and Lithuania on the same day, starting the war.

== Opposing forces ==
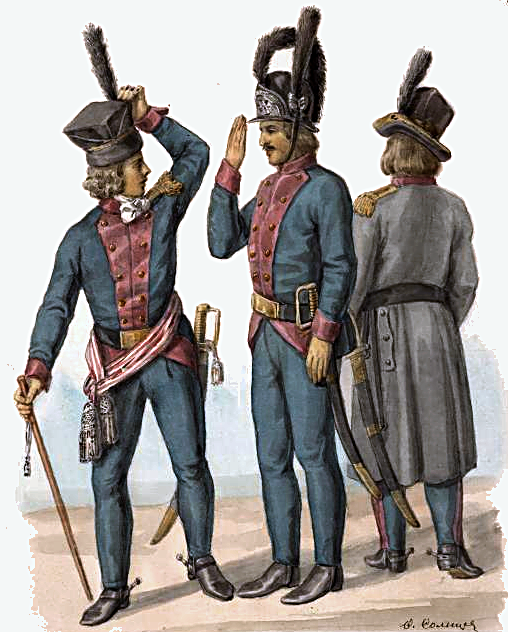
Soldiers of the 3rd Lithuanian Infantry Regiment in 1792

The Russian army numbered nearly 98,000. It was commanded by generals-in-chief Mikhail Krechetnikov and Mikhail Kakhovsky. The Russians also had an advantage in combat experience. The Russian plan called for Kakhovsky to advance through Ukraine, taking Kamieniec Podolski, Chełm and Lublin, and approach Polish capital of Warsaw from the south. Krechetnikov was to advance through Minsk, Vilnius, Brześć Litewski and Białystok, and approach Warsaw from the north, where he was to link with Kakhovsky. Whereas the Russians had good intelligence network in Poland–Lithuania, and were mostly aware of Polish–Lithuanian armies distribution and strength; the Commonwealth had much less intelligence, receiving contradictory and often erroneous reports, and unsure whether the war would even start up to the point the Russian troops crossed the border.

Stanisław August Poniatowski, King of the Polish–Lithuanian Commonwealth, was the commander-in-chief of the Commonwealth's military, but in practice he delegated this position to his nephew, Prince Józef Poniatowski. Poniatowski had in theory at his disposal a 48,000 strong Crown Army and the Grand Ducal Lithuanian Army more than half that size to confront them. In practice, Polish–Lithuanian forces, still forming following the reforms of the Constitution of 3 May (which specified an army size of 100,000) numbered only 37,000. The army was reorganizing, with key documents on unit numbers and composition passed as recently as in April; it was also short on equipment and experienced personnel.

In the southeast corner of the country – the Ukrainian lands – the Polish forces were initially concentrated separately in three regions of the expected front, under Tadeusz Kościuszko, Michał Wielhorski and Prince Poniatowski himself. The Polish Crown army in Ukraine, led by Prince Poniatowski, and supported by Kościuszko, was about 17,000, 21,000 or 24,000 strong (Derdej distinguishes between the primary force of 17,000 and Prince Michał Lubomirski's reserve division, of 4,500). In the southeastern war theater, they faced a nearly four times larger enemy army under General Mikhail Kakhovsky, who had about 64,000 men under his command. Kakhovsky's forces were divided into four corps: 1st, 18,000 strong, under the command of General Mikhail Golenishchev-Kutuzov, 2nd, under General Ivan Dunin, 3rd, under General Wilhelm Derfelden, and 4th, under General Andrei Levanidov. The Targowica Confederates did not represent any real strength; and their attempts to gather popular support in Poland upon crossing borders failed miserably, with only few dozens joining at first; later the number would grow but not significantly, and even the Russians saw them as not having any military value, keeping them from the frontlines.

In Lithuania, the Lithuanian Army numbered about 15,000, with an additional Crown detachment of about 3,000. They were commanded by Duke Louis of Württemberg. Württemberg made no plans for the war, and the troops were not readied for action by the time the war started. The Russian army in that theatre under General Mikhail Krechetnikov was 33,700 strong or 38,000 strong. The Russian army was also divided into four corps: 1st under one of Targowica Confederate leaders, Szymon Kossakowski 7,300 strong, 2nd under General Boris Mellin, 7,000 strong, 3rd under General Yuri Dolgorukov, 15,400 strong, and 4th under General Ivan Fersen, 8,300 strong.

Additional Polish–Lithuanian forces, about 8,000 strong, were to concentrate in Warsaw under the command of King Poniatowski as a reserve.

Tadeusz Kościuszko proposed a plan where the entire Polish army would be concentrated and would engage one of the Russian armies, to assure numerical parity and to boost the morale of mostly inexperienced Polish forces with a quick victory; this plan was however rejected by Prince Poniatowski. (Only a few months before, however, both commanders had the opposite idea – Poniatowski wanted the troops concentrated, and Kościuszko, dispersed). Poniatowski also planned to avoid serious engagements in the first phase of the war, hoping to receive the expected Prussian reinforcements of 30,000 which would bring parity to the two sides.

== War ==
=== Southern theater ===
The first Russian forces crossed the border in Ukraine on the night of 18/19 May 1792. The Russians in that theater would encounter significantly more resistance than they expected, as Commonwealth's top commanders, Prince Poniatowski and Kościuszko were stationed there. Kościuszko joined Prince Poniatowski near Janów on 29 May. The Crown Army was judged too weak to oppose the four columns of enemy armies advancing into West Ukraine and began a fighting withdrawal to the western side of the Southern Bug River, towards Lubar and Połonne, with Kościuszko commanding the rear guard. Poniatowski, in the face of significant numerical inferiority of his forces, and promised reinforcements by King Poniatowski, decided to abandon Ukraine and move to Volhynia, where Połonne was to be fortified as a major defensive point, and where Lubomirski was tasked with gathering supplies.

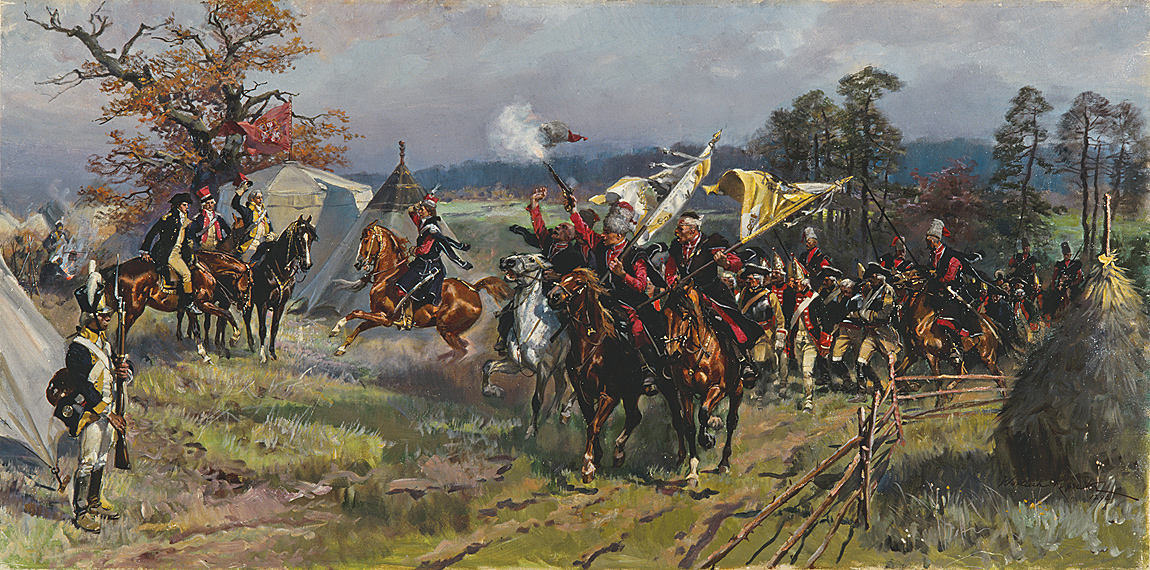
After the Battle of Zieleńce, by Wojciech Kossak

On 14 June Wielhorski's unit was defeated at the Battle of Boruszkowce. On 17 June Poniatowski finally received awaited reinforcements, about 2,000 troops led by Michał Lubomirski. Next day the Poles, led by Prince Poniatowski, defeated one of the Russian formations of general Irakly Morkov at the Battle of Zieleńce on 18 June. The victory was celebrated by King Poniatowski, who sent the new Virtuti Militari medals for the campaign leaders and soldiers, as "the first since John III Sobieski".

The Russian forces, however, kept advancing. Under the command of Józef Poniatowski, the Polish army retreated in good order, yielding to the more powerful enemy as necessary to avoid annihilation. In early July, near Dubno, Prince Poniatowski and Kościuszko were betrayed by Michał Lubomirski, who was tasked with King Poniatowski with resupplying the troops; instead Lubomirski joined the Russian side and either hid the supplies for the Polish army, or outright passed them to the Russians. Lubomirski, however, was a powerful magnate, and it took until late May for the King officially to relieve him of his command. Within about a month of the Russian invasion, the Poles had mostly retreated from Ukraine. On 7 July Kościuszko's forces fought a delaying battle with the Russians at Volodymyr (Battle of Włodzimierz). Meanwhile, Poniatowski's army retreated to the Bug River, where Kościuszko's units on 18 July fought the Battle of Dubienka, which was a draw. With about 5,300 troops Kościuszko defeated the attack of 25,000 Russians under General Mikhail Kakhovsky. Kośicuszko then had to retreat from Dubienka, as the Russians begun flanking his positions crossing the nearby Austrian border. Although the Poles had to retreat from the Bug River line, they were not defeated so far, and a decisive battle or battles at more favorable locations closer to Warsaw were expected.

=== Northern theater ===
In the Grand Duchy of Lithuania the Russians crossed the border four days later than in the south, on 22 May. Poland–Lithuania's ally, the Kingdom of Prussia, broke its alliance with it and the Prussian commander of the Lithuanian army, Duke Württemberg, betrayed the Polish–Lithuanian cause by refusing to fight the Russians. He never reached the frontlines, feigned illness in Wołczyn, and issued contradictory orders to his troops.

Thus the Lithuanian army initially did little to oppose the advancing Russians, and kept withdrawing before their advance. Minsk was abandoned, after some skirmishes, on 31 May. Only after a change of commander on 4 June, did the Army, now under General Józef Judycki, try to stand and fight the Russians. The Russians however defeated Judycki at the Battle of Mir on 11 June and kept advancing through the Grand Duchy. The Lithuanian army retreated towards Grodno. On 14 June the Russians took Vilnius, after only a small skirmish with local garrison; on 19 June, incompetently defended Nieśwież; and on 20 June, Kaunas, this time without any opposition. Judycki, disgraced, was replaced by Michał Zabiełło on 23 June. Nonetheless, since Mir, no decisive engagements occurred in the northern theater, as the Lithuanian army withdrew in relative order towards Warsaw, after minor defeat at Zelva, eventually taking defensive positions along the Bug river near Brest. Russians took Grodno on 5 July and Białystok on 17 July. On 23 July the Russians took Brest, defeating the local garrison, but on 24 they were defeated near Krzemień-Wieś; this last battle was the first significant victory on the Lithuanian front.

=== War ends ===
While Prince Poniatowski and Kościuszko considered the outcome of the war still open and were planning to use the combined Polish–Lithuanian forces to defeat the still separate Russian forces, King Poniatowski, with the consent of the Guardians of the Laws (cabinet of ministers) decided to ask for a ceasefire. Tsarina Catherine demanded that King Poniatowski join the pro-Russian aristocratic faction, the Targowica Confederation; with his cabinet split, he gave in to her demand around 22–23 July, which effectively forced Prince Poniatowski to terminate military resistance. The last military confrontation of the war was fought on 26 July at Markuszów in Lublin province, where an enemy attack was repelled by Polish cavalry led by Poniatowski.

At the time King Poniatowski decided to sue for peace, the Polish army was still in a good fighting condition not having suffered from any major defeat nor lack of supplies. King Poniatowski thought that due to Russian numerical superiority defeat was nonetheless imminent, and more could be gained through negotiations with the Russians, with whom he hoped a new alliance could be formed. Although subsequent events would prove him wrong, the question of whether this could have been foreseen, and prevented through continued military resistance, has been subject to much debate among historians.

The Commonwealth's military was widely dissatisfied with the ceasefire; Kościuszko, Prince Poniatowski and many others would criticize the King's decision and many, including Kościuszko, would resign their commission in the coming weeks. Prince Poniatowski even considered rebelling against his uncle's orders, and even issued orders to bring the King to the army's camp by force if necessary, as was postulated by the more radical faction. Ultimately he decided not to continue fighting against his uncle's will, and the order was rescinded at the last moment before the departure of the group charged with capturing the King.

== Aftermath ==
Most Polish historians agree that the Polish capitulation was a mistake both from the military perspective, and the political one. In the realm of military, the Poles had reasonable chances to defend the Vistula river line, and exhaust the Russian invading forces. From the political one, showing a willingness to fight could have persuaded the partitioning powers that their plan was too costly.

King Poniatowski's hopes that the capitulation would allow an acceptable diplomatic solution to be worked out were soon dashed. With new deputies bribed or intimidated by the Russian troops, a new session of parliament, known as the Grodno Sejm, took place in fall 1793. On 23 November 1793, it concluded its deliberations under duress, annulling the constitution and acceding to the Second Partition. Russia took 250,000 square kilometres (97,000 sq mi) of the Commonwealth's territory, while Prussia took 58,000 square kilometres (22,000 sq mi). This event reduced Poland–Lithuania's population to a third of what it was before the First Partition. The rump state was garrisoned by Russian troops and its independence was strongly curtailed.

This outcome came as a surprise to most of the Targowica Confederates, who had wished only to restore the status quo ante bellum (magnate-favoring Golden Freedoms) and had expected that the overthrow of the 3 May Constitution would achieve that end, and nothing more. The last bid to restore the reformed Commonwealth came with the Kościuszko Uprising in 1794. The uprising failed and resulted in the Third Partition in 1795, in which the country lost all its remaining territories and the Polish–Lithuanian Commonwealth ceased to exist.

== List of battles ==
=== Lithuanian front ===
- Battle of Opsa (May 25–26)
- Battle of Stołpce (June 10)
- Battle of Mir (June 11)
- Battle of Zelwa (July 4–5)
- Battle of Wojszki (July 14)
- Battle of Brest (July 23)
- Battle of Krzemień (July 24)

=== Ukrainian front ===
- Battle of Boruszkowce (June 14)
- Battle of Zieleńce (June 18)
- Battle of Dubienka (July 18)
- Battle of Markuszów (July 26)

== See also ==
- Partitions of Poland

== Sources ==
=== In English ===
- Bideleux, Robert; Jeffries, Ian (28 January 1998). A History of Eastern Europe: Crisis and Change. Psychology Press. ISBN 978-0-415-16111-4.
- Carsten, Francis Ludwig, ed. (1 January 1961). The New Cambridge Modern History. Vol. 5: The Ascendancy of France, 1648–88. Cambridge University Press. ISBN 978-0-521-04544-5.
- Davies, Norman (1982). God's Playground, a History of Poland: The origins to 1795. Columbia University Press. ISBN 978-0-231-05351-8.
- Davies, Norman (30 March 2005). God's Playground: A History of Poland. Vol. I: The origins to 1795. Columbia University Press. ISBN 978-0-231-12817-9.
- Górny, Maciej (2006). "The Targowica Confederation". In Kopeček, Michal (ed.). Late Enlightenment: Emergence of the Modern 'National Idea' (PDF). Discourses of Collective Identity in Central and Southeast Europe (1770–1945). Vol. 1. Central European University Press. ISBN 978-963-7326-52-3.
- Jędruch, Jacek (1982). Constitutions, Elections, and Legislatures of Poland, 1493–1977: A Guide to Their History. University Press of America. ISBN 978-0-7818-0637-4.
- LeDonne, John P. (1997). The Russian empire and the world, 1700–1917: the geopolitics of expansion and containment. Oxford University Press. ISBN 978-0-19-510927-6.
- Lord, Robert Howard (1915). The Second Partition of Poland: A Study in Diplomatic History. Harvard University Press. OCLC 579571081.
- Lukowski, Jerzy; Zawadzki, Hubert (2001). A concise history of Poland. Cambridge University Press. ISBN 978-0-521-55917-1.
- Lukowski, Jerzy (3 August 2010). Disorderly liberty: the political culture of the Polish-Lithuanian Commonwealth in the eighteenth century. Continuum International Publishing Group. ISBN 978-1-4411-4812-4.
- Pickus, David (2001). Dying With an Enlightening Fall: Poland in the Eyes of German Intellectuals, 1764–1800. Lexington Books. ISBN 978-0-7391-0153-7.
- Sanford, George (2002). Democratic government in Poland: constitutional politics since 1989. Palgrave Macmillan. ISBN 978-0-333-77475-5.
- Schroeder, Paul W. (1996). The transformation of European politics, 1763–1848. Oxford University Press. ISBN 978-0-19-820654-5.
- Stone, Daniel (2001). The Polish–Lithuanian State: 1386–1795. University of Washington Press. ISBN 978-0-295-98093-5.
- Storozynski, Alex (28 April 2009). The Peasant Prince: Thaddeus Kosciuszko and the Age of Revolution. St. Martin's Press. ISBN 978-0-312-62594-8.
- Wandycz, Piotr Stefan (2001). The price of freedom: a history of East Central Europe from the Middle Ages to the present. Psychology Press. ISBN 978-0-415-25491-5.

=== In Polish ===
- Bardach, Juliusz; Leśnodorski, Boguslaw; Pietrzak, Michal (1987). Historia panstwa i prawa polskiego [History of Polish State and Law] (in Polish). Warsaw: Panstwowe Wydawnictwo Naukowe. OCLC 654549824.
- Bauer, Krzysztof (1991). Uchwalenie i obrona Konstytucji 3 Maja [Passing and Fall of the 3 May Constitution] (in Polish). Wydawnictwa Szkolne i Pedagogiczne. ISBN 978-83-02-04615-5.
- Derdej, Piotr (2008). Zieleńce–Mir–Dubienka 1792 (in Polish). Bellona. ISBN 978-83-11-11039-7.
- Gierowski, Józef Andrzej (1986). Historia Polski, 1764–1864 [History of Poland, 1764–1864] (in Polish). Warszawa: Państwowe Wydawnictwo Naukowe. pp. 60–63. ISBN 978-83-01-03732-1.
- Herbst, Stanisław (1969). "Tadeusz Kościuszko". Polski Słownik Biograficzny (in Polish). Vol. 14. Wrocław: Zakład narodowy im. Ossolińskich. p. 433.
- Łojek, Jerzy (1986). Geneza i obalenie Konstytucji 3 maja [Genesis and Fall of the 3 May Constitution] (in Polish). Wydawn. Lubelskie. ISBN 978-83-222-0313-2.
- Michalski, Jerzy (2011). "Stanisław August Poniatowski". Polski Słownik Biograficzny (in Polish). Vol. 41. p. 628.
- Mikuła, Wojciech (1995). Zieleńce Dubienka: z dziejów wojny w obronie Konstytucji 3 maja [Zieleńce Dubienka: From the History of the War in Defense of the 3 May Constitution] (in Polish). Ajaks.
- Nadzieja, Jadwiga (1988). Od Jakobina do księcia namiestnika [From Jacobin to Prince Namestnik] (in Polish). Wydawnictwo "Śląsk". pp. 38–39. ISBN 978-83-216-0682-8.
- Skowronek, Jerzy (1986). Książę Józef Poniatowski [Prince Józef Poniatowski] (in Polish). Wrocław: Ossolineum. ISBN 83-04-02321-0.
- Storozynski, Alex (January 2011). Kościuszko: Książe chłopów [Kościuszko: Prince of Peasants] (in Polish). W.A.B. ISBN 978-83-7414-930-3.

=== In Russian ===
- Velichko, Konstantin; Novitsky, Vasily; Schwarz, Alexey von; Apushkin, Vladimir; Schulz, Gustav von (1912). Sytin Military Encyclopedia (in Russian). Vol. X: "Елисавета Петровна – Инициатива". Moscow: Типография Т-ва И. Д. Сытина.
