= Battle of Mogilev (1581) =

1581 battle part of the Livonian War

- Part of the Livonian campaign of Stephen Báthory
Date	27 June 1581
Location	Mogilev, now in Belarus
Result	Polish–Lithuanian victory

Belligerents
Polish–Lithuanian Commonwealth	Tsardom of Russia; Tatars

Commanders and leaders
Marcin Kazanowski; Krzysztof Radziwiłł; Temryk Szymkowicz	Ivan IV the Terrible; Roman Buturlin †; Nikita Czerkaski †

Strength
200 hussars 300 light cavalry Unknown amount of riflemen or civilians	30,000–45,000 men

Casualties and losses
Large amount of horses Some wounded	Unknown
- Many villages burned down

The Battle of Mogilev took place on 27 June 1581 during the Livonian campaign of Stephen Báthory. It was fought between the Polish–Lithuanian Commonwealth led by Marcin Kazanowski and Krzysztof Radziwiłł against the Tsardom of Russia and Tatars led by Ivan the Terrible. After 7 hours of fighting on an open field, it resulted in a Polish–Lithuanian victory.

== Prelude ==
In 1577, the Danzig rebellion came to an end, with Stephen Báthory being elected. This led to the collapse of the plan to partition the Polish–Lithuanian state between Moscow and the Habsburgs, which caused Ivan IV to undertake the last, decisive and "great" campaign of 1577.

By 1581, the situation became more and more critical for Ivan IV due to the Polish–Lithuanian troops remaining in Muscovy territory.

On 25 June that year, a Russian army supported by Tatars which consisted of 30,000–45,000 men crossed the Dnieper. It had no possibility of besieging cities, and its main goal was to devastate the area. They would attack the suburb or Mogilev two days later.

== Battle ==
On 27 June, which was a Tuesday, the Russian army attacked the outskirts of Mogilev. The civilians or riflemen, along with 200 hussars began to defend against the attack. They pushed the enemy out of the city and fought for 7 hours on the open field. After receiving false information that the entire army was approaching the Dnieper, the Russians fled in panic when they saw 300 light cavalry along with Temryk Szymkowicz's and Krzysztof Radziwiłł's rotas arrive. An attempt to burn the city down was also thwarted. Two voivodes died in the battle: Roman Buturlin and prince Nikita Czerkaski.

== Aftermath ==
Polish troops suffered large losses in horses, with many villages being burned and some wounded. However, none of the Polish soldiers died.

Once Ivan's troops withdrew, Batory was finally able to march on Pskov.

There are many accounts of the Battle of Mogilev, including one given by Lieutenant Markowice:

They burned down several hundred houses of Your Majesty's Mogilev, but due to the large number of people they did not squeeze into the city and Mogilev's castle, but with God's help, Your Majesty's soldiers, the troop of Mr. Trogski [Krzysztof Radziwiłł], Mr. Kazanowski and Mr. Temrukow, who had gathered at that time, repelled them and defended the castle and the city, and had a battle with them.

— Lietutenant Markowski

Another account of the battle was also completed by Father Jan Piotrowski:

Today, Markowski, lieutenant of Kazanowski's unit, came from here; this brought about that on 27 June, from Moscow to Mohylov, as he says, about 30,000 people also came from Tartars, probably a wicked and trivial people, so that they could choose Mogilev, and Kazanowski's troop itself, without a captain, having heard about them, had previously arrived there with one 200 horses ; Our men chased them for seven hours that day, so that they were not allowed to approach the city. Then Temryk's troops came [to their aid]. Moscow, seeing many people, began to escape and, having reached the Dnieper, crossed [to the other bank]. On that crossing, our men rebuked them and drove them to that side, kidnapping several prisoners whom Markowski - he is from our Kruszwica - brought to the king. [Kazanowski's] troops of horses did great damage there: Moscow fired everything at them with bows and rifles. There are also enough wounded comrades and servants; none killed by God's grace [in this round].

— Father Jan Piotrowski

== Legacy ==
The battle showed just how powerful the hussars were. Michał Mackiewicz from the Polish Army Museum states:

The Russians are afraid to fight the Polish cavalry. Even then, the fame of this ride was so great that the Russians realised that they had no chance in an equal fight on a hard-packed field. I suspect it was the same near Mogilev.

— Michał Mackiewicz

He further continued this by saying:

I think that near Mogilev the hussars fought in a loose formation, trying to do battles in the suburbs rather than classic charges. As it turns out, however, the hussars were also well-prepared for this, because they were excellent with melee weapons, they were professional soldiers who had been learning how to fight all their lives and, above all, were aware of their value, which cannot be said about the random crew who wanted to occupy Mogilev.

— Michał Mackiewicz

== See also ==
- Livonian War

== Sources ==
- Wipper, Robert Yuryevich (1944). Ivan Grozny. Moscow: Foreign Languages Pub. House.
