= Spadone =

Spadone may refer to:

- in Italian, a greatsword
- in Latin, a eunuch
