= Battle of Wenden (1601) =

Battle of the Polish-Swedish war

- Part of the Polish–Swedish War (1600–1611)
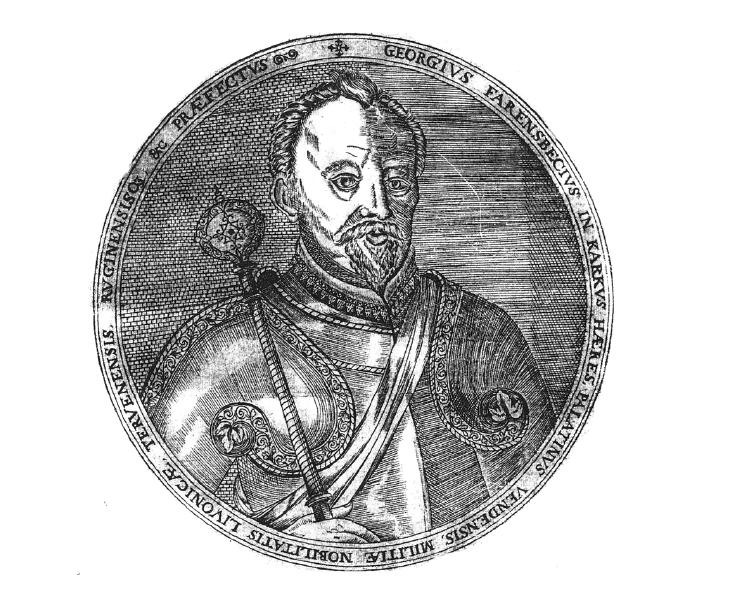
- Jürgen von Fahrensbach
Date	7 January 1601
Location	Wenden, Livonia (now in Latvia) 57°18′48″N 25°16′12″E
Result	Polish–Lithuanian victory

Belligerents
Polish–Lithuanian Commonwealth	Sweden

Commanders and leaders
Maciej Dębiński; Jürgen von Farensbach	Hans Bengtsson

Strength
700 (including 350 Polish hussars)	More than 3,000

Casualties and losses
10 killed 60 wounded	Around 300–1,900 killed and wounded 100 captured 13 banners

The Battle of Wenden (also known as Battle of Kieś) took place on 7 January 1601, during the Polish–Swedish War (1600–1611). Polish–Lithuanian forces were led by Jürgen von Farensbach (Jerzy Farensbach) and Maciej Dębiński. The Swedes were under Hans Bengtsson. The battle is significant as the first encounter between Swedish reiters and Polish hussars.

== Prelude ==
The military campaign began in late 1599. Swedish forces captured Narva, Estonia, then after gathering 10 thousands troops under the command of Charles IX Parnu they captured Fellin, and on 6 January 1601 Dorpat. The day after the capture of Dorpat, the Swedish forces (3,000 soldiers) suddenly attacked the Poles and Lithuanians camped under Wenden.

== Battle ==
Led by Colonel Maciej Dembiński, the Polish–Lithuanian army, despite the surprise, quickly prepared for battle and went into offensive. In the meantime, Jürgen von Farensbach arrived with reinforcements, increasing the Polish–Lithuanian troop count to 700 soldiers. The Swedish riders attempting to use Caracole were faced with the charge of the hussars, commonly used on battlefields by the Polish-Lithuanian armies. The fight did not last long, and the Swedish cavalry run away. When the retreating Swedish cavalry rode through the frozen river Gauja ice broke under the weight of the horses, causing further losses to the Swedish forces. The Swedish infantry did not want to retreat but was quickly defeated, and that constituted the main part of the substantial losses to the Swedish side, estimated to be between 300 and 1.900 either killed or wounded and about 100 captured, and all the guns. Poles and Lithuanians lost only 10 killed and 60 wounded.

== Aftermath ==
The battle was won by the Poles and Lithuanians, who, however, were not able to take advantage of their victory as their troops, having not been paid in a long time, begun looting the local countryside. During the winter of 1601, the army of Charles IX captured Valmiera reaching the line of the Daugava river. The next stage of the war was the siege and Battle of Kokenhausen that took place under the city walls.
