= Estoc =

Type of sword

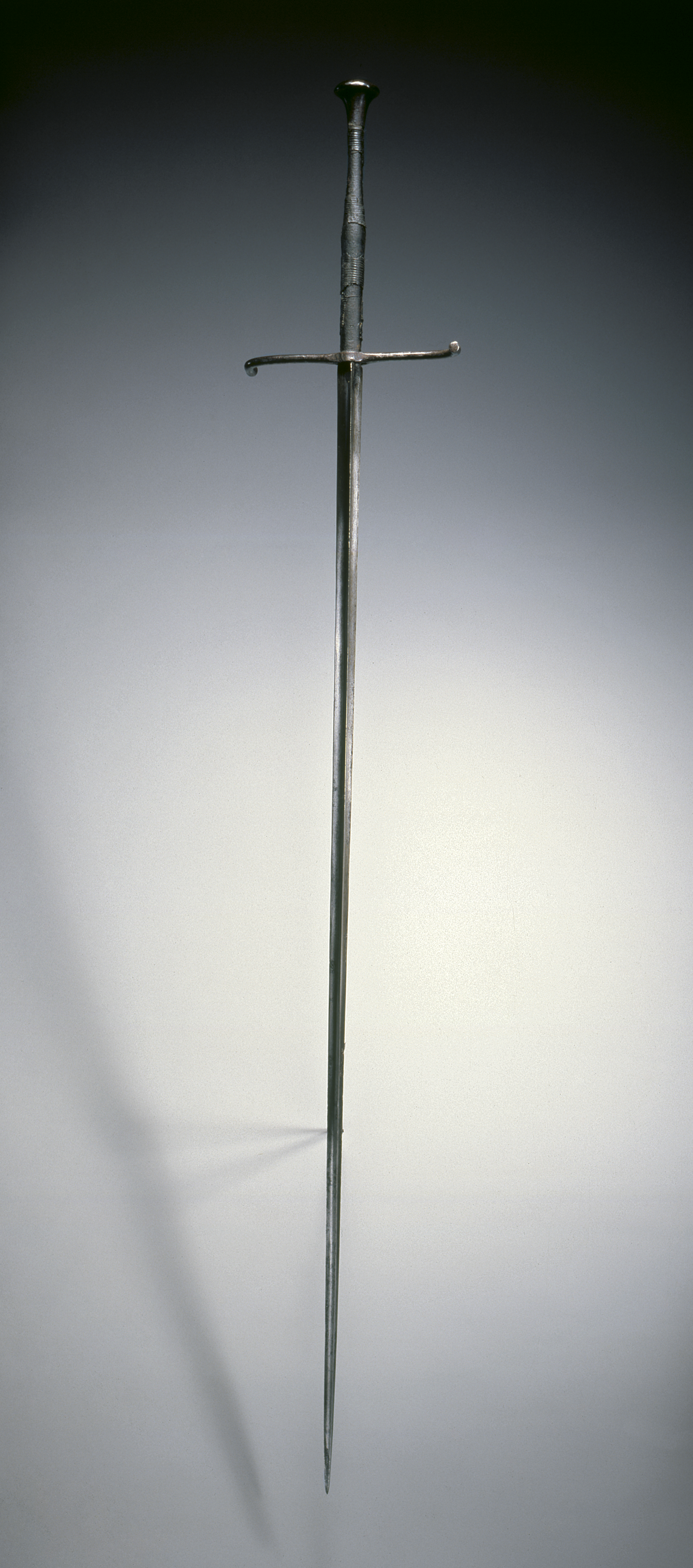
Estoc

The French estoc is a type of sword, also called a tuck in English, in use from the 14th to the 17th century. It is characterized by a cruciform hilt with a grip for two-handed use and a straight, edgeless, but sharply pointed blade around 36 to 52 in (91 to 132 cm) in length. It is noted for its ability to pierce mail armor.

== Description ==
The estoc was a variation of the longsword designed for fighting against mail armor or plate armor. It was long, straight and stiff with no cutting edge, just a point. Examples from Poland are more than 160 cm (62 in) long, with a blade of 130 cm (52 in); however, others show a more manageable 115 cm (46 in), with a 90 cm (36 in) blade. Such swords average about four pounds (2 kg) with no specimen weighing more than six pounds (2.7 kg).

Blade cross-sections can be triangular, square, rhomboid, or flat hexagonal. This geometry leaves hardly any cutting capability as a sharpened edge could simply not be ground but allowed the weapon to be lengthy, stiff, and very acutely pointed.

Early on, the estoc was hung from the saddle when on horseback and simply hung from the belt when a soldier took to the ground. As the weapon developed, however, infantrymen began to wear it in a scabbard. Most varieties of estoc provide a long grip like that of a greatsword, though others mimic the Zweihänder in providing a long ricasso with a secondary guard of parierhaken. (Note: small, pointed lugs or flanges protruding from their blades 4-8 inches below their guard. These parrierhaken or 'parrying hooks' act almost as a secondary guard for the ricasso to catch and bind other weapons or prevent them from sliding down into the hands.) As on the Zweihänder, this extended grip gives the wielder the advantage of extra leverage with which more accurately and powerfully to thrust the long weapon. Some other forms provided finger rings, curved quillons, or other varieties of compound hilts.

== History ==
As armour improved, so did the methods of attacking it. It was quickly realized that cutting weapons were losing their effectiveness, so crushing weapons such as maces and axes were utilized. Thrusting weapons that could split the rings of mail, or find the joints and crevices of plate armour, were also employed. Long tapered swords could also be used as lances once an actual lance had splintered. Thus was the estoc developed. The French word estoc translates to thrust.

While there is nothing to stop an estoc from being one-handed, most are two-handed, being used half-sword or two hands on the grip.

During the English Civil Wars, General George Monck recommended that foot soldiers carry "a good stiff tuck, not very long" because they often broke regular swords by using them to chop firewood.

In addition to being popular for use as a cavalry weapon, the estoc was frequently used during dismounted hand-to-hand combat at tournaments, its lack of a sharp edge reducing the risk of unintentional injury.

=== Hunting ===
It was also widely employed as a hunting sword in the late 15th century, usually for hunting wild boar, bear, and stag; typically from horseback. Although hunting with a sword is less ideal than using a lance or spear, the added element of danger added to the thrill of the hunt, since using a sword brought the hunter in closer proximity to dangerous animals, as well as bringing more glory. The estoc was useful for this purpose, being a long sword with a strong blade, able to take the shock of meeting with an animal without breaking, while also giving the necessary reach to attack from horseback. However, it also had a very thin, sharp point, designed for penetrating chain mail. This thin point had little immediate terminal wounding effect on a wild boar or bear, unless a vital organ was hit, requiring a second man to stand by with a spear to finish off the wounded animal. It was also very easy to over-penetrate, bringing the wielder into danger from the animal's claws and teeth. Around 1500 AD, a solution was reached by replacing the thin point of the estoc with a standard leaf-shaped boar-spear head, in essence creating a one-handed short spear. To prevent the blade from over-penetrating, most were fitted with a cross-shaft above the blade. To allow the blade to fit into a scabbard, these were typically simple removable pegs of wood or bone, but some examples have spring-loaded shafts that automatically deploy when the blade is drawn. An early image of these "boar-spear swords" shows Emperor Maximilian I in a triumphal procession after a successful boar-hunt, the riders proudly carrying their spear-pointed swords upright. These weapons quickly became widely popular all over Europe, and examples can be found in numerous illustrations and descriptions of the time.

== Bullfighting ==
Estoc is also the name given for the sword used by a matador in the Spanish sport of bullfighting, also known as espada de matar toros ('sword for killing bulls'). The matador's estoc was typically a shorter one-handed thrusting sword that was around 88 cm (35 in) in length.

== See also ==
- Oakeshott types XV, XVII
- Koncerz
- Rapier
- Gisèle d'Estoc (1845–1894), French writer, sculptor, feminist
