= Bootmakers' Tower =

Coordinates: 46.2213°N 24.7920°E

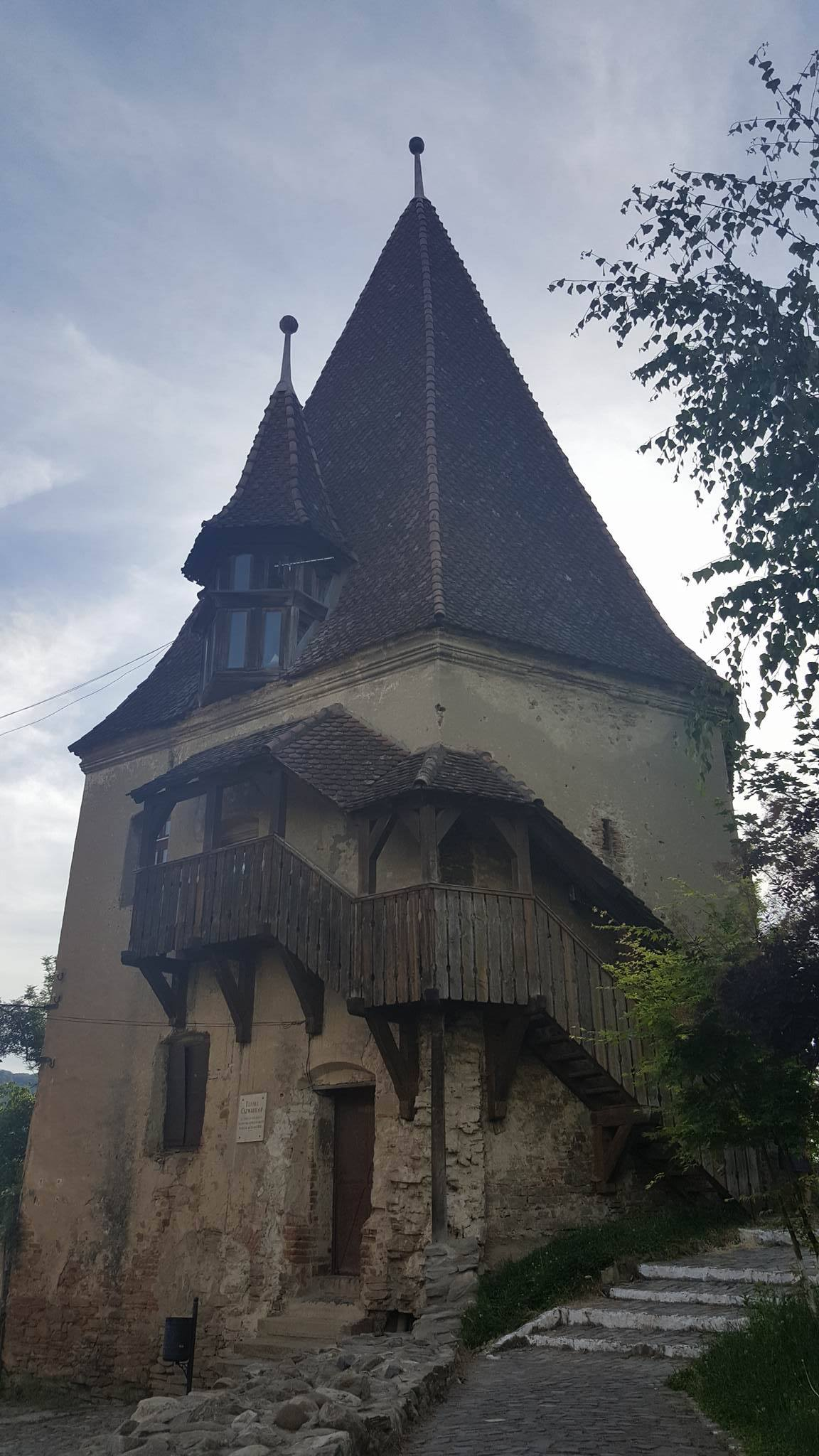
Bootmakers' Tower

The Bootmakers' Tower (Romanian: Turnul Cizmarilor, German: Schusterturm, Hungarian: Csizmadiák tornya) is located in the north-east of the Citadel in Sighişoara, Mureș County in Romania. The building has baroque architectural influences. Despite its low height, the tower is interesting due to its pentagon plan, an outer diameter of 10 meters long and a roof hosting two small and elegant observation towers, one facing South-east and one North-west. The current tower was built in 1681 on the site of a previous destroyed tower. It forms part of the Historic Centre of Sighişoara World Heritage Site.

== Restorations ==
The earliest documents mentioning the old tower are dated 1522. A large amount of gunpowder was contained inside the tower and this is the main reason why the fire of 1676 destroyed it completely. In 1681 a brand new tower, under the leadership of Mayor Michael Helwig, was built according to the baroque style.

The tower used to have a bastion of artillery which was demolished in 1846. The General Registry of the city, which keeps a weapon inventory shows the presence in the past of fourteen large and six small arquebuses, three muskets, two quintals of lead, two quintals of gunpowder, many cannonballs, eight spears and a two handed sword.

The Citadel tower facade has changed as well. The windows were enlarged, assuming very different dimensions from the ones in the Middle Ages; this modification also necessitated modifications to the entrance.

From 1854-1975 it held the town archives.

Access between floors was largely provided by an external staircase until the second half of the 19th century when an internal staircase, via hatches, was used. In recent years, during 2001, an exterior wooden staircase was built on the facade of the tower.

Since 2000 the tower has hosted a local radio station.
