= Battle of Kokenhausen =

1601 battle of the Polish–Swedish War

- Part of the Polish–Swedish War (1600–1611)
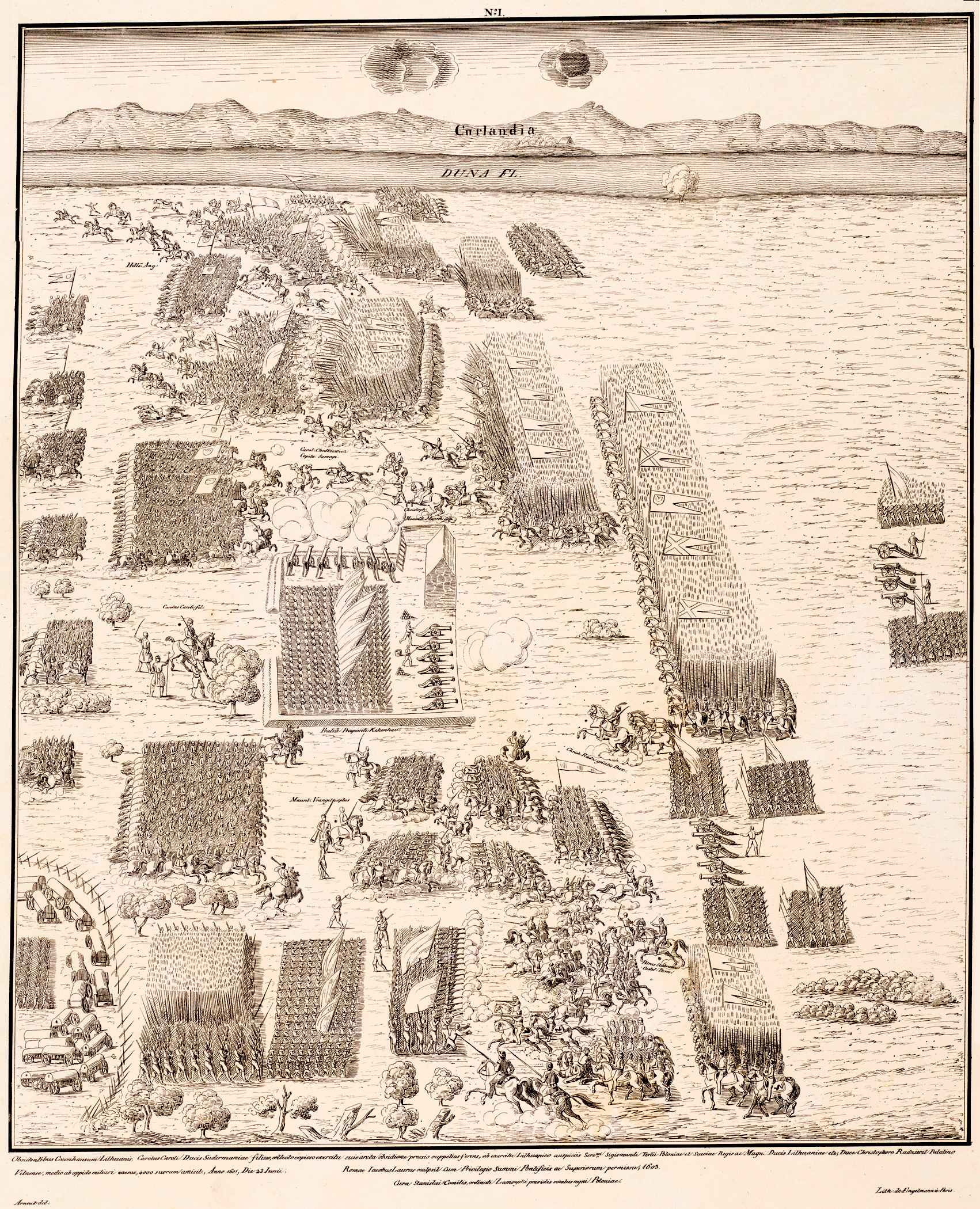
- Engraving by Giacomo Lauro (1603)
Date	23 June 1601
Location	Koknese, Livonia (now in Latvia) 56°38′17″N 25°25′02″E
Result	Polish–Lithuanian victory

Belligerents
Polish–Lithuanian Commonwealth	Sweden

Commanders and leaders
Krzysztof "Piorun" Radziwiłł; Jan Karol Chodkiewicz	Carl Gyllenhielm

Strength
300 infantry 2,700 cavalry 9 guns	900 infantry 4,000 cavalry 17 guns

Casualties and losses
100–200 dead	2,000–3,000 dead

The Battle of Kokenhausen (Kokenhuza, Latvian: Koknese) was a major battle opening the Polish–Swedish War (1600–1611). It took place on the 13 June (O.S.) or 23 June (N.S.) 1601 near Koknese (in Baltic German Kokenhausen) in Livonia (now in Latvia). In the battle, Polish–Lithuanian forces defeated the Swedish relief force and captured the besieging force, relieving the Polish–Lithuanian garrison. The battle is notable as one of the greatest victories of the Polish–Lithuanian winged hussars, who defeated their numerically superior Swedish adversaries.

== Prelude ==
Kokenhausen was one of three major forts blocking the Swedish progress on the line of the Daugava River. Swedish forces of about 2,000 under Carl Carlsson Gyllenhielm had been blockading the fortified town of Kokenhausen, located on Daugava River, between Riga and Daugavpils - since 10 March - after the arrival of Duke Charles with heavy artillery - laying a siege to it since 28 March. On 1 April the Swedes had taken the town but not the inner castle, which was still defended by a Polish–Lithuanian garrison. Charles left about 2,600 strong besieging force, and moved north to Erlaa.

The Polish–Lithuanian relief army of 800 men under Krzysztof Mikołaj "Thunderbolt" Radziwiłł arrived around 11 May and in turn started to besiege the Swedes; it grew to over 4,000 with 16 cannons by mid-June. The Swedes decided to prioritize the relief of the Kokenhausen siege force. They had been reinforcing it with supplies through the river, but many of them had been captured by Commonwealth troops on 29 May. A major Swedish relief force of about 2,000 under Carl Gyllenhielm had been defeated at Erlaa by 1,000 Commonwealth troops under Jan Siciński in early June. Emboldened by the victory, other Polish–Lithuanian detachments captured some nearby strongholds and harassed the Swedish units. They did not assault Kokenhausen, however, as they were waiting for more artillery, and were content to starve the Swedes out. The Swedes did not give up on securing the site, however, and reinforced to 5,000 the Swedes under Gyllenhielm arrived on the morning of 23 June at Kokenhausen and attempted to break the Polish–Lithuanian encirclement.

== Battle ==
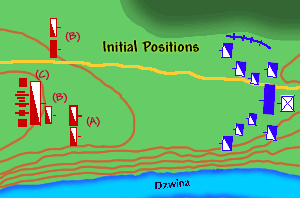
Initial positions

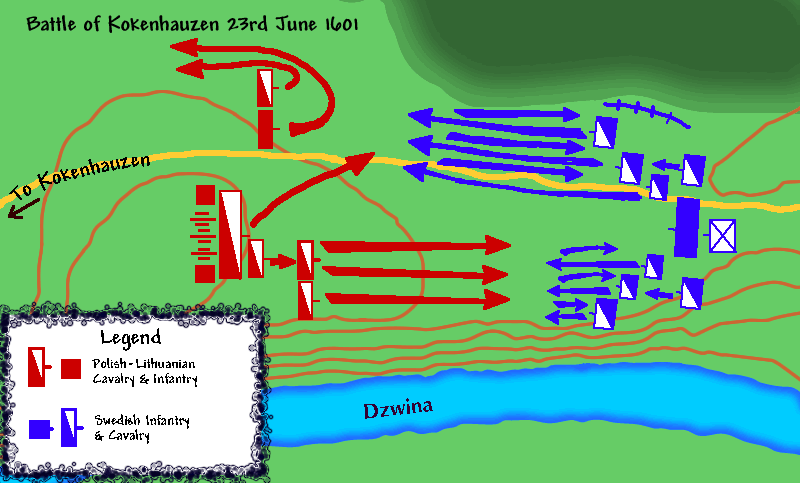
The battle

The field of battle was raised along its edge with the Daugava for some one and a half kilometers to a width of about half a kilometer with the side nearest the river being steep and falling more gently towards the field.

Gyllenhielm had about 900 infantry, 4000 cavalry, and 17 cannons. Radziwiłł left about 500 infantry under Otto Denhoff with orders to maintain the siege, 150 men to guard the camp, and took the field with the rest (around 3,000 men, of which some 400 were infantry, 1,000 winged hussars, and 9 cannons). In addition to Grand Lithuanian Hetman Radziwiłł, the Polish–Lithuanian forces also included the Field Lithuanian Hetman, Jan Karol Chodkiewicz.

Polish–Lithuanian cavalry first broke the Swedish left flank. The Swedish counterattack on the right flank, which while initially successful, was in turn broken by the Polish–Lithuanian hussar counterattack. The Swedish infantry still held against the Polish–Lithuanian cavalry, until being broken by artillery fire. Gyllenhielm gathered some 2,000 cavalry but his troops refused to return to aid the infantry, and he was forced to retreat.

== Aftermath ==
The Poles and Lithuanians lost about 200 men, the Swedes - 2,000 (including almost all of their infantry). After the battle, the Swedish force besieging the Kokenhausen castle, which took no part in the battle, surrendered to the Commonwealth. Swedish siege artillery was also captured.

Both the hussar charges and artillery fire proved decisive in this engagement. The battle is notable as one of the greatest victories of the Polish–Lithuanian hussars, who defeated their numerically superior Swedish adversaries.

== Gallery ==
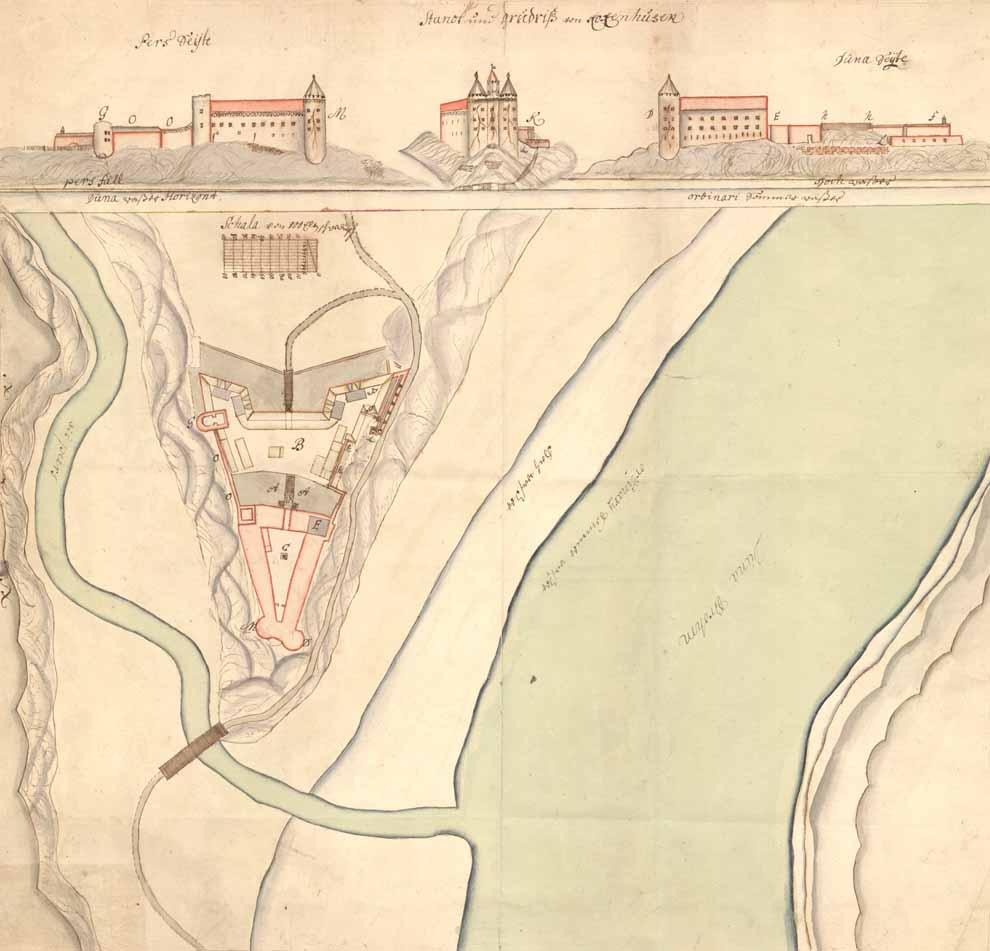
Koknese Fortress. The battle took place on the banks of the Daugava Valley behind the city walls.

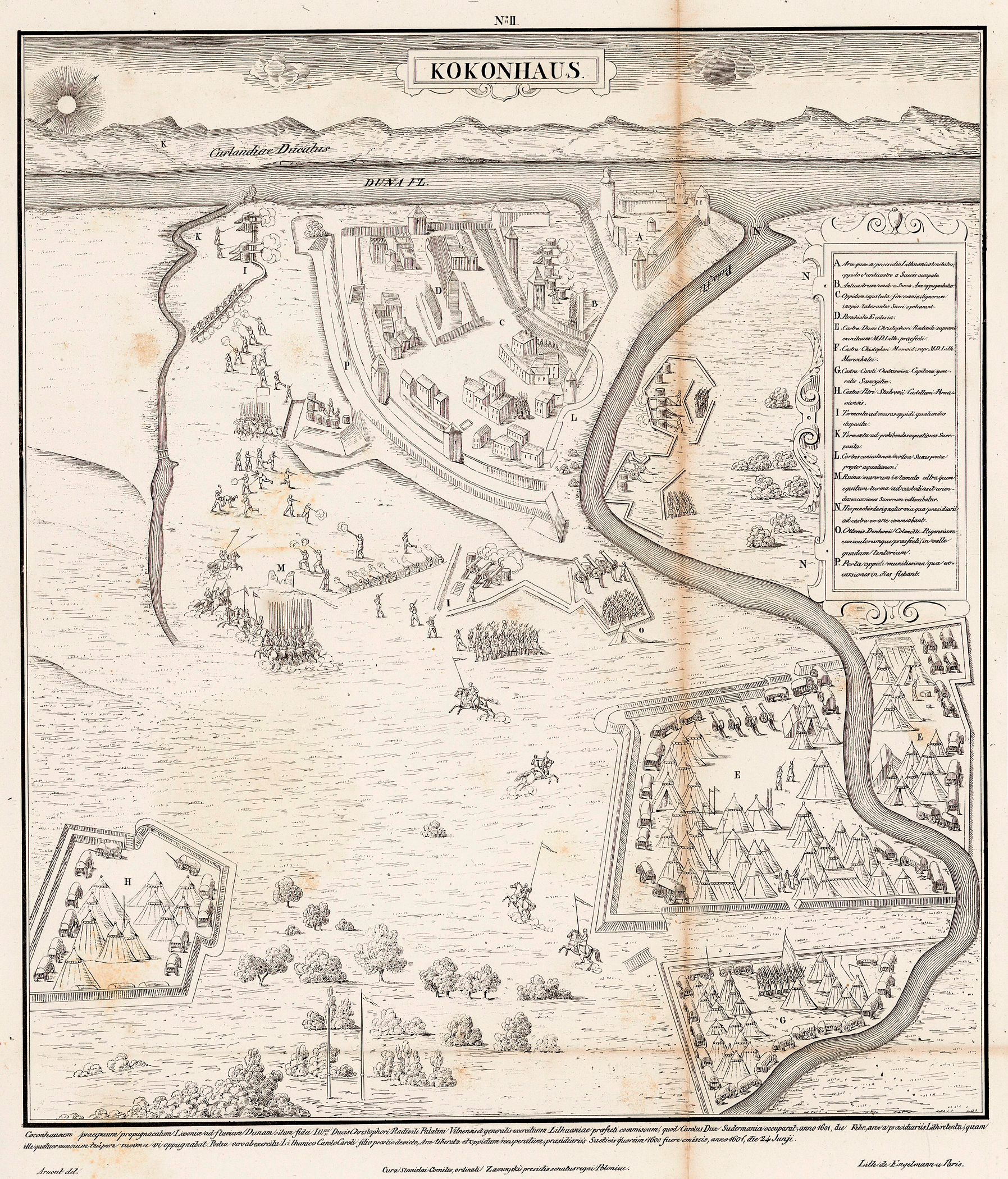
The siege of Koknese from March to June 1601 (engraving by Giacomo Lauro, 1603).
