= Classification of swords =

Types of swords

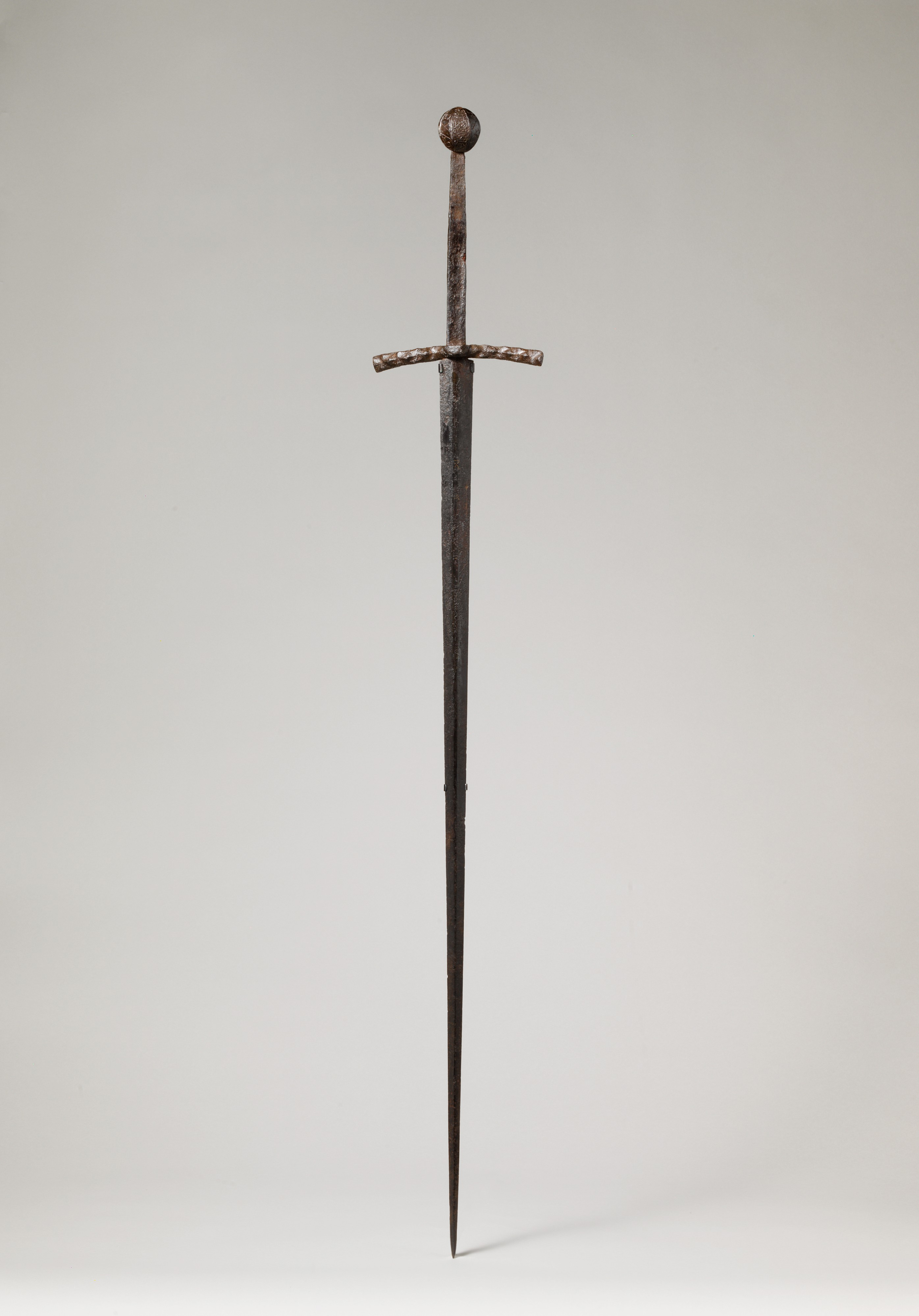
Hand-and-a-half sword, probably German, c. 1400–1430

The English language terminology used in the classification of swords is imprecise and has varied widely over time. There is no historical dictionary for the universal names, classification, or terminology of swords; a sword was simply a single-edged or double-edged knife that grew incrementally longer and more complex with technological advances.

Historical terms without a universal consensus of definition (e.g. "arming sword", "broadsword", "long sword", etc.) were used to label weapons of similar appearance but of different historical periods, regional cultures, and fabrication technology. These terms were often described in relation to other unrelated weapons, without regard to their intended use and fighting style. In modern history, many of these terms have been given specific, often arbitrary meanings that are unrelated to any of their historical meanings.

== Terminology ==
Some of these terms originate contemporaneously with the weapons which they describe. Others are modern or early modern terms used by antiquarians, curators, and modern-day sword enthusiasts for historical swords.

Terminology was further complicated by terms introduced or misinterpreted in the 19th century by antiquarians and in 20th century pop culture, and by the addition of new terms such as "great sword", "Zweihänder" (instead of Beidhänder), and "cut-and-thrust sword". Historical European martial arts associations have turned the term spada da lato into "side-sword". Furthermore, there is a deprecation of the term "broadsword" by these associations. All these newly introduced or redefined terms add to the confusion of the matter.

The most well-known systematic typology of blade types of the European medieval sword is the Oakeshott typology, although this is also a modern classification and not a medieval one. Elizabethans used descriptive terms such as "short", "bastard", and "long" which emphasized the length of the blade, and "two-handed" for any sword that could be wielded by two hands.

== Classification by hilt type ==
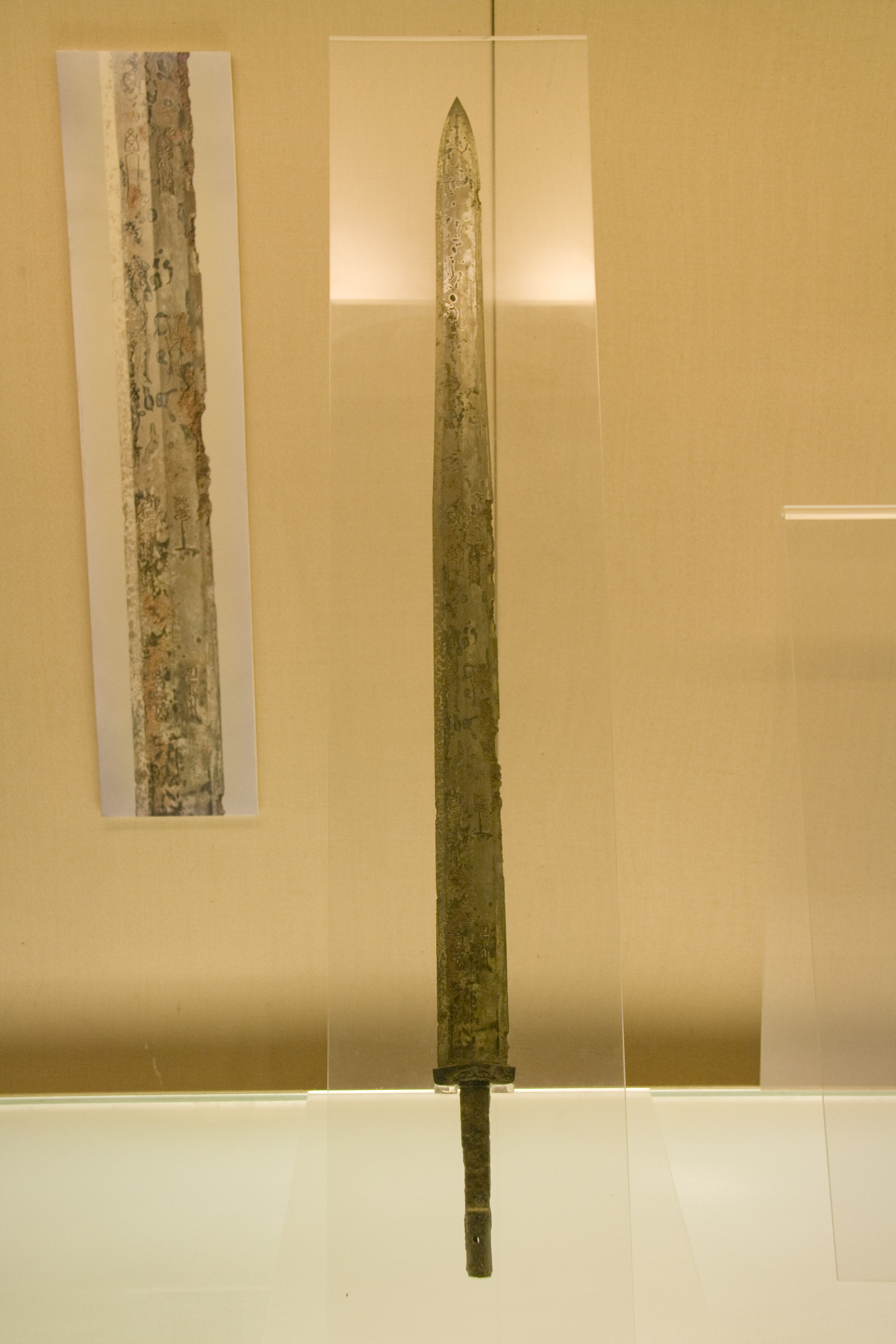
Warring States era jian (double edged sword)

=== Handedness ===
The term two-handed sword may refer to any large sword designed to be used primarily with two hands:

- the European longsword, popular in the Late Middle Ages and Renaissance.
  - the Scottish late medieval claymore (not to be confused with the basket-hilted claymore of the 18th century)
- the Bidenhänder sword favored by the Landsknechte of 16th-century Germany

The term "hand-and-a-half sword" is modern (late 19th century). During the first half of the 20th century, the term "bastard sword" was used regularly to refer to this type of sword, while "long sword" or "long-sword" referred to the rapier (in the context of Renaissance or Early Modern fencing).

The term "single-handed sword" or "one-handed sword" was coined to distinguish from "two-handed" or "hand-and-a-half" swords. "Single-handed sword" is used by Sir Walter Scott. It is also used as a possible gloss of the obscure term tonsword by Nares (1822); "one-handed sword" is somewhat later, recorded from c. 1850.

Some swords were designed for left-hand use, although left-handed swords have been described as "a rarity".

==== Great sword ====
Great swords or greatswords are related to the long swords of the Middle Ages. The great sword was developed during the Renaissance, but its earlier cousin the Scottish Claymore was very similar in size and use, like the "outsized specimens" between 160 and 180 cm (63 and 71 in) (approx. the same height as the user) such as the Oakeshott type XIIa or Oakeshott type XIIIa. These swords were too heavy to be wielded one-handed and possessed a large grip for leverage.

==== Claymore ====
The Scottish name "claymore" (Scottish Gaelic: claidheamh mór, lit. "large/great sword") can refer to either the longsword with a distinctive two-handed grip, or the basket-hilted sword. The two-handed claymore is an early Scottish version of a great sword.

==== Zweihänder ====
The Zweihänder ("two-hander") or Beidhänder ("both-hander") is a true two-handed sword, in the sense that it cannot be wielded in only one hand. It was a specialist weapon wielded by certain Landsknechte (mercenary soldiers), so-called Doppelsöldners. A similar weapon used in Spain and Portugal was called montante.

== Classification by blade type ==
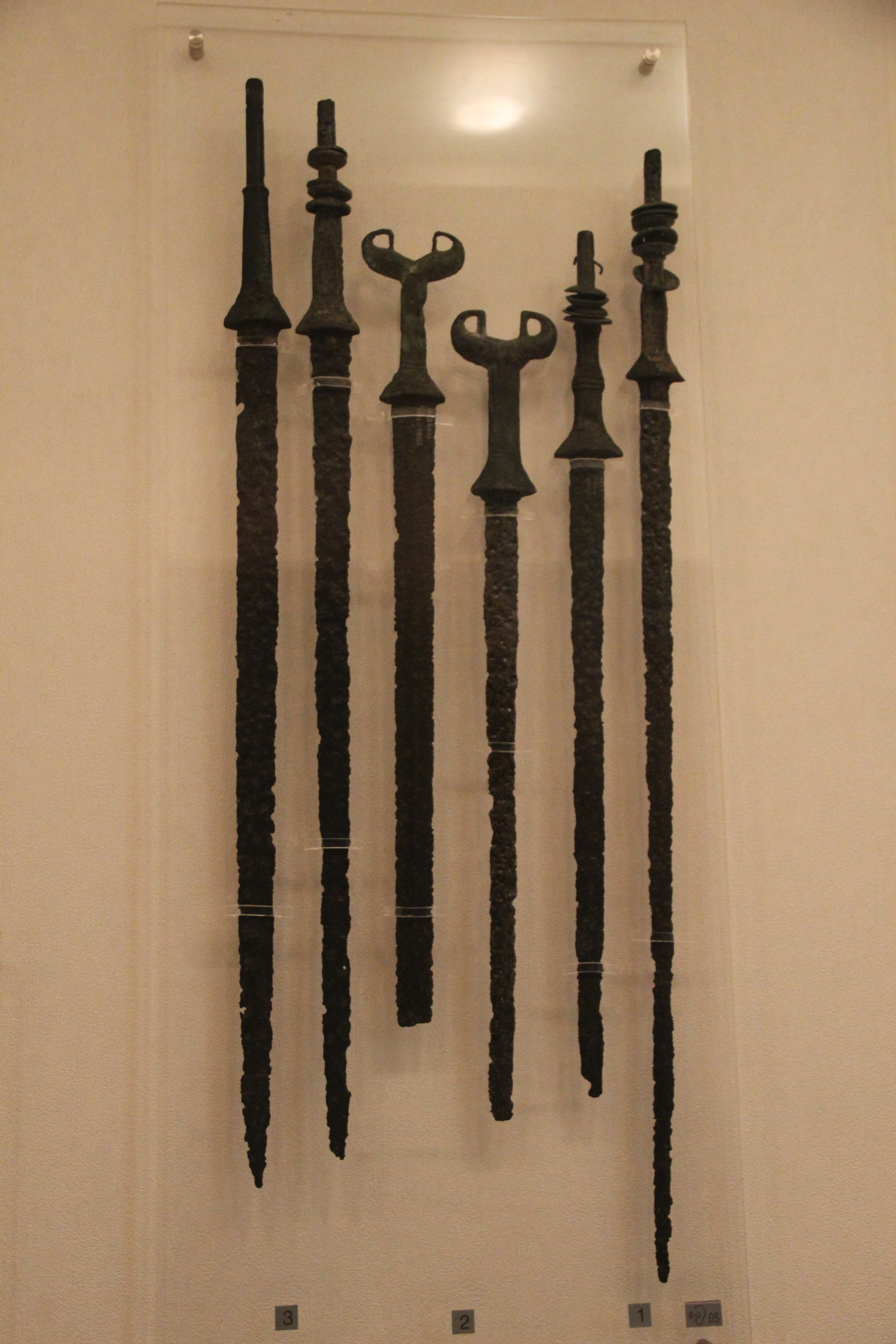
Han dynasty Jian swords (above)

=== Double-edge and straight swords ===
These are double-edged, usually straight-bladed swords, designed for optimized balance, reach and versatility.

==== Jian ====
Jian (simplified Chinese: 剑; traditional Chinese: 劍; pinyin: jiàn; Cantonese: gim) is a double-edged straight sword used during the last 2,500 years in China. The first Chinese sources that mention the jian date to the 7th century BC during the Spring and Autumn period; one of the earliest specimens being the Sword of Goujian. Historical one-handed versions have blades varying from 45 to 80 cm (18 to 31 in) in length. The weight of an average sword of 70 cm (28 in) blade-length would weigh about 700 to 900 g (1.5 to 2.0 lb). There are also larger two-handed versions used by ancient and medieval armies and for training by many styles of Chinese martial arts. Two handed jians from the time of the Chu and Han dynasty were up to 58 in (150 cm) long.

==== Longsword ====
In modern times, the term longsword most frequently refers to a late Medieval and Renaissance weapon designed for use with two hands. The German langes Schwert ("long sword") in 15th-century manuals did not necessarily denote a type of weapon, but the technique of fencing with both hands at the hilt.

The French épée bâtarde and the English bastard sword originate in the 15th or 16th century, originally having the general sense of "irregular sword or sword of uncertain origin". It was "[a sword] which was neither French, nor Spanish, nor properly Landsknecht [German], but longer than any of these sturdy swords." Espée bastarde could also historically refer to a single-handed sword with a fairly long blade compared to other short swords.

Joseph Swetnam states that the bastard sword is midway in length between an arming sword and a long sword, and Randall Cotgrave's definition seems to imply this, as well. The French épée de passot was also known as épée bâtarde (i.e., bastard sword) and also coustille à croix (literally a cross-hilted blade). The term referred to a medieval single-handed sword optimized for thrusting. The épée de passot was the sidearm of the franc-archers (French or Breton bowmen of the 15th and 16th centuries). The term passot comes from the fact that these swords passed (passaient) the length of a "normal" short sword.

The "Masters of Defence" competition organised by Henry VIII in July 1540 listed "two hande sworde", "bastard sworde", and "longe sworde" as separate items (as it should in Joseph Swetnam's context).

Antiquarian usage in the 19th century established the use of "bastard sword" as referring unambiguously to these large swords. However, George Silver and Joseph Swetnam refer to them merely as "two hande sworde". The term "hand-and-a-half sword" is modern (late 19th century). During the first half of the 20th century, the term "bastard sword" was used regularly to refer to this type of sword.

The Elizabethan long sword (cf. George Silver and Joseph Swetnam) is a single-handed "cut-and-thrust" sword with a 4 ft (1.2 m) blade similar to the long rapier. "Let thy (long) Rapier or (long) Sword be foure foote at the least, and thy dagger two foote." Historical terms (15th to 16th century) for this type of sword included the Italian spada longa (lunga) and French épée longue.

The term longsword has been used to refer to different kinds of sword depending on historical context:

- Zweihänder or two-hander, a late Renaissance sword of the 16th century Landsknechte, the longest sword of all;
- the long "side sword" or "rapier" with a cutting edge (the Elizabethan long sword).

==== Spatha ====
The spatha was a double-edged longsword used by the Romans. The idea for the spatha came from the swords of ancient Celts in Germany and Britain. It was longer than the gladius, and had more reach, so the spatha was most popular with soldiers in the cavalry. The blade could range between 0.5 and 1 m (1 ft 8 in and 3 ft 3 in) long while the handle was usually between 18 and 20 cm (7 and 8 in).

==== Broadsword ====
- Claymore
- Basket-hilted sword
- Sabre

The term "broadsword" was never used historically to describe the one-handed arming sword. The arming sword was wrongly labelled a broadsword by antiquarians as the medieval swords were similar in blade width to the military swords of the day (that were also sometimes labeled as broadswords) and broader than the dueling swords and ceremonial dress swords.

==== Short swords and daggers ====
Knives such as the seax and other blades of similar length between 30 and 60 cm (1 and 2 ft), they are sometimes construed as swords because of their longer blades. This is especially the case for weapons from antiquity, made before the development of high quality steel that is necessary for longer swords, in particular:

- Iron Age swords:
  - Seax, a tool and weapon, common in Northern Europe
  - Gladius, an early ancient Roman thrusting short sword for legionaries
  - Xiphos, a double-edged, single-hand blade used by the ancient Greeks
- Certain Renaissance-era sidearms:
  - Baselard, a late medieval heavy dagger
  - Cinquedea, a civilian long dagger
  - Dirk, the Scottish long dagger (biodag)
  - Hanger or wood-knife, a type of hunting sword or infantry sabre
- Certain fascine knives:
  - Model 1832 Foot Artillery Sword, is a short sword designed after the Roman gladius with a blade length around 48 cm (19 in) in length. It was also known as a coupe-chou (literally "cabbage cutter") in France

=== Edgeless and thrusting swords ===
The edgeless swords category comprises weapons which are related to or labelled as "swords" but do not emphasise hacking or slashing techniques or have any cutting edges whatsoever. The majority of these elongated weapons were designed for agility, precision and rapid thrusting blows to exploit gaps in the enemy's defences; the major joints of the arms, the opening in a visor. However they mainly saw prominence outside the battlefield as a duelling weapon.

==== Basket-hilted sword ====
The basket-hilted sword is a sword type of the early modern era characterised by a basket-shaped guard that protects the hand. The basket hilt is a development of the quillons added to swords' crossguards since the Late Middle Ages. In modern times, this variety of sword is also sometimes referred to as the broadsword.

==== Xiphos ====
The Spartiatēs were always armed with a xiphos as a secondary weapon. Among most Greek warriors, this weapon had an iron blade of about 60 cm (24 in). The Spartan version of the sword typically had a blade about 30 to 45 cm (12 to 18 in) in length. The Spartan's shorter weapon proved deadly in the crush caused by colliding phalanx formations, as it was far more capable of being thrust through gaps in the enemy's shield wall and armour, where there was little to no room for longer edged weapons. The groin and throat were among the favourite targets.

==== Rapier ====
The term "rapier" appeared in the English lexicon via the French épée rapière which comes from the Spanish ropera; recorded for the first time in the Coplas de la panadera, by Juan de Mena, written between approximately 1445 and 1450. The Spanish term refers to a sword used with clothes (espada ropera, 'dress sword'), due to it being used as an accessory for clothing, usually for fashion and as a self-defense weapon.

Some swords categorised as rapiers are completely edgeless or have only a partially sharpened blade, however the majority have effective cutting blades.

==== Panzerstecher and koncerz ====
The Panzerstecher ("armour stabber") is a German and East European weapon with a long, edgeless blade of square or triangular cross-section for penetrating armour. Early models were either two-handers or "hand-and-a-half" hilted, while later 16th and 17th century models (also known as koncerz) were one-handed and used by cavalry.

==== Tuck and verdun ====
The "tuck" (French estoc, Italian stocco) is an edgeless blade of square or triangular cross-section used for thrusting. In French, estoc also means thrust or point; and estoc et taille means thrust and cut.

The tuck may also get its name from the verb "to tuck" which means "to shorten".

==== Small-sword ====
The small sword or smallsword (also court sword or dress sword, French: épée de cour) is a light one-handed sword designed for thrusting which evolved out of the longer and heavier rapier of the late Renaissance. The height of the small sword's popularity was between the mid-17th and late 18th century. It is thought to have appeared in France and spread quickly across the rest of Europe. The small sword was the immediate predecessor of the Épée de Combat from which the Épée developed and its method of use—as typified in the works of such authors as Sieur de Liancour, Domenico Angelo, Monsieur J. Olivier, and Monsieur L'Abbat—developed into the techniques of the French classical school of fencing. Small swords were also used as status symbols and fashion accessories; for most of the 18th century anyone, civilian or military, with pretensions to gentlemanly status would have worn a small sword on a daily basis.

=== Single-edge and curved swords ===
These are single-cutting edged, usually thick or curved construction bladed swords, typically designed for stonger slashing, chopping, severing limbs, tripping or broad sweeping techniques; but were often very poorly designed for stabbing. Swordsmen were trained to use the bladed side in circumventing an opponent's protected flank (known as "curve into the guard"), and the dulled side for defensive and blocking techniques. The curve automatically makes a swing draw an arc making it much easier to slash.

==== Backsword ====
The backsword was a single-edged, straight-bladed sword, typically for military use. This type of sword had a thickened back to the blade (opposite the cutting edge), which gave the blade strength. The backsword blade was cheaper to manufacture than a two-edged blade. This type of sword was first developed in Europe in the 15th century and reflected the emergence of asymmetric guards, which made a two-edged blade somewhat redundant. The backsword reached its greatest use in the 17th and 18th century when many cavalry swords, such as the British 1796 Heavy Cavalry Sword, were of this form.

==== Dao ====
Dao are single-edged Chinese swords, primarily used for slashing and chopping. The most common form is also known as the Chinese sabre, although those with wider blades are sometimes referred to as Chinese broadswords. In China, the dao is considered one of the four traditional weapons, along with the gun (stick or staff), qiang (spear), and the jian (sword). It is considered "The General of All Weapons".

==== Hook sword ====
The hook sword, twin hooks, fu tao or shuang gou (simplified Chinese: 钩; traditional Chinese: 鈎 or 鉤; pinyin: Gou), also known as hu tou gou (tiger head hook), is a Chinese weapon traditionally associated with northern styles of Chinese martial arts and Wushu weapons routines, but now often practiced by southern styles as well.

==== Kopis ====
Unlike the xiphos, which is a thrusting weapon, the kopis was a hacking weapon in the form of a thick, curved single edged iron sword. In Athenian art, Spartan hoplites were often depicted using a kopis instead of the xiphos, as the kopis was seen as a quintessential "villain" weapon in Greek eyes.

==== Khopesh ====
The khopesh is an ancient Egyptian curved short sword with a overall length of approx. 50 to 60 cm (20 to 24 in) and was typically made of bronze or iron.

==== Katana ====
Historically, katana (刀) were one of the traditionally made Japanese swords (日本刀, nihontō) that were used by the samurai of feudal Japan. Modern versions of the katana are sometimes made using non-traditional materials and methods. The katana is characterized by its distinctive appearance: a curved, slender, single-edged blade usually with a round guard and long grip to accommodate two hands.

==== Hanger ====
The hanger (obs. whinyard, whinger, cuttoe), wood-knife, or hunting sword is a long knife or short sword that hangs from the belt and was popular as both a hunting tool and weapon of war.

==== Falchion and cutlass ====
The falchion (French braquemart, Spanish bracamarte) proper is a wide straight-bladed but curved edged hanger or long knife. The term 'falchion' may also refer to the early cutlass.

The cutlass or curtal-axe also known as a falchion (French badelaire, braquemart, coutelas, malchus; Italian coltellaccio, storta; German messer, dussack, malchus) is a broad-bladed curved hanger or long knife. In later usage, 'cutlass' referred to the short naval boarding sabre.

==== Sabre ====
The British sabre, American saber, French sabre, Spanish sable, Italian sciabola, German Säbel, Russian sablya, Hungarian szablya, Polish szabla, and Ukrainian shablya is a single-edged curved bladed cavalry sword.

==== Scimitar ====
The scimitar (French cimeterre, Italian scimitarra) is a type of saber that came to refer in general to any sabre used by the Turks or Ottomans (kilic), Persians (shamshir) and more specifically the Stradioti (Albanian and Greek mercenaries who fought in the French-Italian Wars and were employed throughout Western Europe). The scimitar proper was the Stradioti saber, and the term was introduced into France by Philippe de Commines (1447 – 18 October 1511) as cimeterre, Italy (especially the Venetian Republic who hired the stradioti as mercenaries) as scimitarra, and England as cimeter or scimitar via the French and Italian terms.

== See also ==
- Types of swords
- History of the sword
- Oakeshott typology
