= Polish hussars =

Polish heavy cavalry from the 16th to 18th centuries

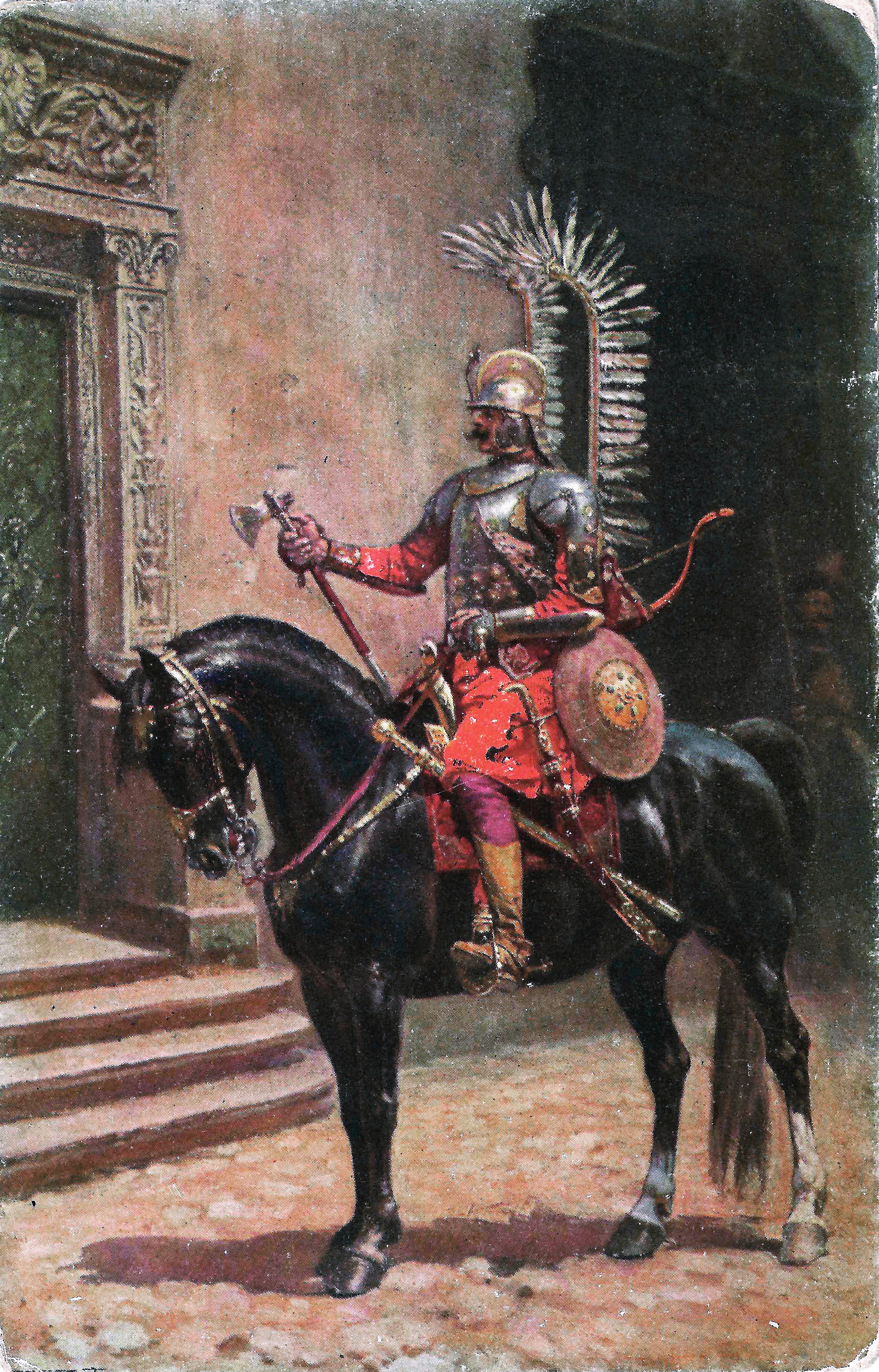
- Active: 1503–1702 (disbanded in 1776)
- Allegiance: Kingdom of Poland; Polish-Lithuanian Commonwealth
- Type: Heavy cavalry
- Role: Maneuver warfare Raiding; Shock attack
- Nickname: The Angels of Death
- Motto: Amor Patriae Nostra Lex (Love of the fatherland is our law)
- Colors: Red and white. Differed per unit.
- Equipment: Burgonet, lance, mace (bludgeon), hatchet, sabre
- Engagements: Tree list: Crimean–Nogai slave raids in Eastern Europe; Battle of Martynów; Battle of Ochmatów (1644); Lithuanian–Muscovite War (1512–1522); Battle of Orsha; Moldavian–Polish War (1530–1538); Battle of Obertyn; Danzig rebellion; Battle of Lubieszów; Livonian campaign of Stephen Báthory; Battle of Mogilev (1581); War of the Polish Succession (1587–1588); Battle of Byczyna; Polish–Swedish War (1600–1611); Battle of Wenden (1601); Battle of Kokenhausen; Battle of Reval (1602); Battle of Kircholm; Polish–Muscovite War (1605–1618); Siege of Smolensk (1609–1611); Battle of Klushino; Battle of Moscow (1612); Polish–Ottoman War (1620–1621); Battle of Khotyn (1621); Polish–Swedish War (1626–1629); Battle of Gniew; Battle of Wenden (1626); Battle of Trzciana; Battle of Górzno; Smolensk War; Siege of Smolensk (1632–1633); Deluge; Khmelnytsky Uprising; Battle of Zhovti Vody; Battle of Loyew (1649); Battle of Berestechko; Battle of Loyew (1651); Russo-Polish War (1654–1667); Battle of Shklow; Battle of Polonka; Battle of Lyubar; Battle of Chudnov; Second Northern War; Battle of Wojnicz; Battle of Warka; Battle of Kłecko; Battle of Warsaw (1656); Polish–Ottoman War (1672–1676); Battle of Khotyn (1673); Battle of Lwów (1675); Great Turkish War; Polish–Ottoman War (1683–1699); Battle of Hodów; Battle of Vienna; Battle of Párkány; Battle of Podhajce (1698); Great Northern War; Battle of Kliszów

The Polish hussars (/həˈzɑːrs/; Polish: husaria [xuˈsarja]), (Note: Alternative English pronunciations: /həˈsɑːr/; /hʊˈzɑːr/) alternatively known as the winged hussars, were an elite heavy cavalry formation active in Poland and in the Polish–Lithuanian Commonwealth from 1503 to 1702. Their epithet is derived from large rear wings, which were intended to demoralize the enemy during a charge. The hussars ranked as the elite of Polish cavalry until their official disbanding in 1776.

The hussar dress was ostentatious and comprised plated body armour (cuirass, spaulders, bevors, and arm bracers) adorned by gold ornaments, a burgonet or lobster-tailed pot helmet and jackboots as well as versatile weaponry such as lances, long thrusting swords, sabres, pistols, carbines, maces, hatchets, war hammers, and horseman's picks. It was customary to maintain a red-and-white colour scheme, and to be girded with tanned animal hide. The wings were traditionally assembled from the feathers of raptors, and the angel-like frame was fastened onto the armour or saddle.

The early hussars were light cavalry units of exiled Serbian warriors who came to Poland from Hungary as mercenaries in the early 16th century. Following the reforms of King Stephen Báthory (r. 1576–1586), the Polish military officially adopted the unit and transformed it into heavy shock cavalry, with troops recruited from the Polish nobility. The Polish hussar differs greatly from the light, unarmoured hussars that developed concurrently outside Poland.

The hussar formation proved effective against Swedish, Russian, and Ottoman forces, notably at the battles of Kircholm (1605), Klushino (1610), and Khotyn (1673). Their military prowess peaked at the Siege of Vienna in 1683, when hussar banners participated in the largest cavalry charge in history and successfully repelled the Ottoman attack. From their last engagement in 1702 (at the Battle of Kliszów) until 1776, the obsolete hussars were demoted and largely assigned to ceremonial roles.

== History ==
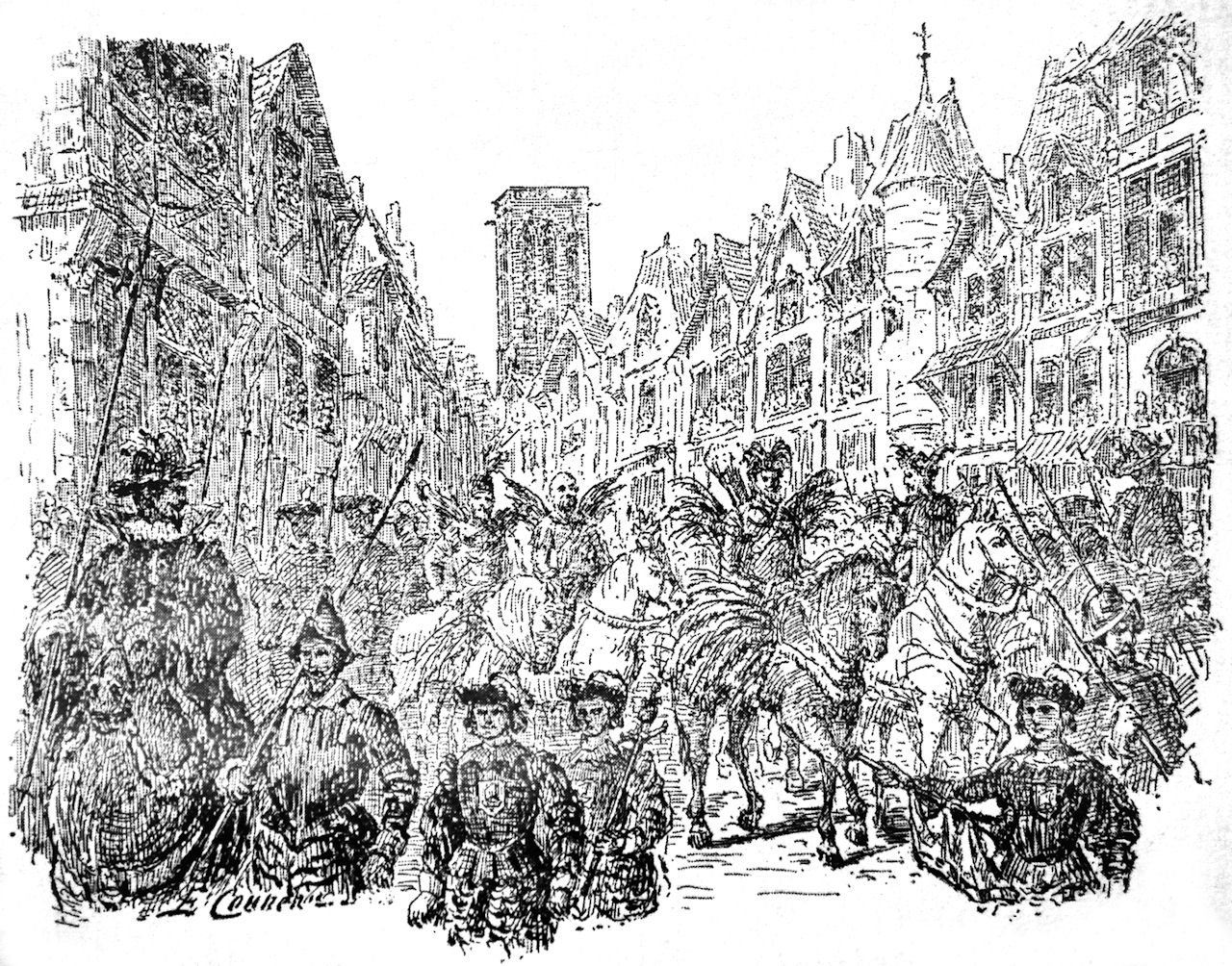
Entrance of winged Polish hussar delegates in La Rochelle, France, in 1573, following the Siege of La Rochelle (1572–1573) and their offering of the Polish throne to the Duke of Anjou.

The etymology of the word hussar stems from the Serbian word gusar meaning "wanderer/brawler". Hussars originated in mercenary units of exiled Serbian warriors from Hungary. Mercenary lancers of Serb origin, known as the Rascians, were frequently hired to counter Ottoman sipahi and deli cavalry. In the 15th century, the hussars based on those of Matthias Corvinus were adopted by some European armies to provide light, expendable cavalry units.

The oldest reference to hussars in Polish records dates to the year 1500, when the Rascians were employed by Grand Treasurer Andrzej Kościelecki to serve under the banner of the royal household. However, it is possible that they were in service much earlier and their contribution was not well-documented. As the Ottoman raids on the southeastern frontier intensified, the so-called Rascian Reform (1500–1501) during the reign of John I Albert solidified the role of an early hussar in Polish ranks.

The first hussar formation was established by the decree of the Sejm (Polish parliament) in 1503, which hired three Hungarian banners. Soon, recruitment also began among the Poles. Being far more expendable than the heavily armoured lancers of the Renaissance, the Serbo-Hungarian hussars played a fairly minor role in the Polish Crown victories during the early 16th century, exemplified by the victories at Orsha (1514) and Obertyn (1531). During the so-called "transition period" of the mid-16th-century, heavy hussars largely replaced armoured lancers riding armoured horses, in the Polish Obrona Potoczna cavalry forces serving on the southern frontier.

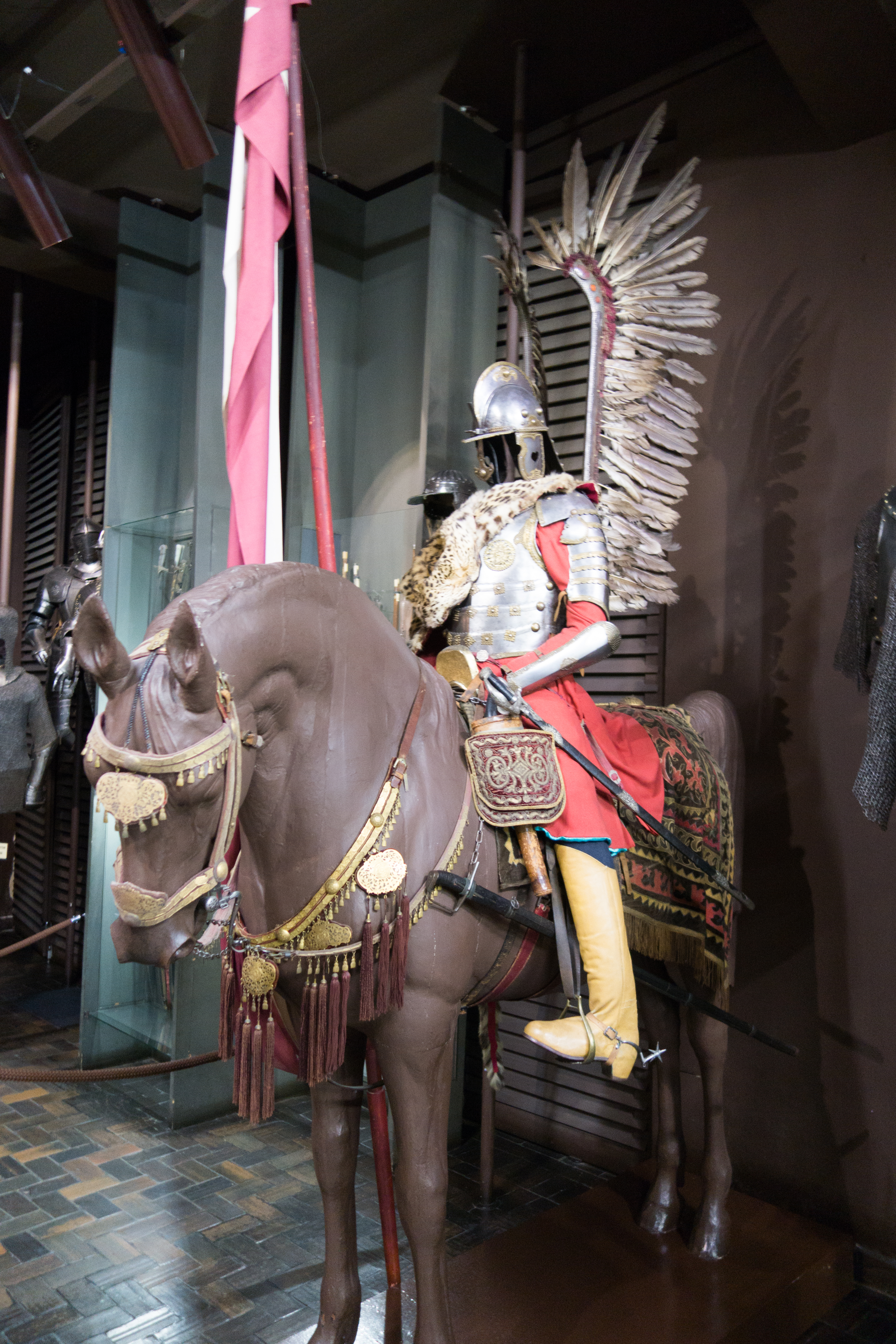
Reconstruction using 17th-century armour, Polish Army Museum.

The true winged hussar arrived with the reforms of the King of Poland and Grand Duke of Lithuania Stephen Bathory in the 1570s and was later led by the King John III Sobieski. The hussars became the elite cavalry, and were a branch of cavalry in the Polish army from the 1570s until 1776 when their duties and traditions were passed on to the uhlans by a parliamentary decree. Most hussars were recruited from the wealthier Polish nobility (szlachta). Each hussar towarzysz ("companion") raised his own poczet or lance/retinue. Several retinues were combined to form a hussar banner or company (chorągiew husarska).

Over the course of the 16th century, hussars in Hungary became heavier in character: they abandoned wooden shields and adopted metal-plated body armour. When Bathory was elected king of Poland and later accepted as a Grand Duke of Lithuania in 1576, he reorganized the hussars of his Royal Guard into a heavy formation equipped with a long lance as their main weapon. By the reign of Bathory (1576–1586), the hussars had replaced medieval-style lancers in the Polish Crown army, and they now formed the bulk of the Polish cavalry. By the 1590s, most Polish hussar units had been reformed along the same "heavy" model. These heavy hussars were known in Poland as husaria.

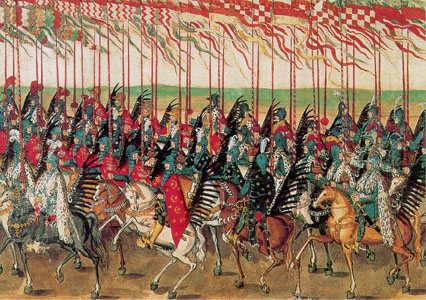
Polish hussars during entry into Kraków, detail of so-called Stockholm Roll, 1605.

With the Battle of Lubiszew in 1577, the 'Golden Age' of the husaria began. Between then and the Battle of Vienna in 1683, the hussars fought many battles against various enemies, most of which they won. In the battles of Lubiszew in 1577, Byczyna (1588), Kokenhausen (1601), Kircholm (1605), Klushino (1610), Chocim (1621), Martynów (1624), Trzciana (1629), Ochmatów (1644), Beresteczko (1651), Połonka (1660), Cudnów (1660), Khotyn (1673), Lwów (1675), Vienna (1683), and Párkány (1683), they proved to be the decisive factor against often overwhelming odds. For instance, in the Battle of Klushino during the Polish–Muscovite War, the Muscovites and Swedes outnumbered the Commonwealth army 5 to 1, yet were heavily defeated.

Over time, the role of the hussar evolved into a reconnaissance and advanced scout capacity. Their uniforms became more elaborate as their armour and heavy weapons were abandoned. In the 18th century, as infantry firearms became more effective, heavy cavalry, with its tactics of charging into and breaking infantry units, became increasingly obsolete and hussars transformed from an elite fighting unit to a parade one.

Instead of ostrich feathers, the husaria men wore wooden arcs attached to their armour at the back and raising over their heads. These arcs, together with bristling feathers sticking out of them, were dyed in various colours in imitation of laurel branches or palm leaves, and were a strangely beautiful sight to behold – Jędrzej Kitowicz (1728–1804).

== Tactics ==
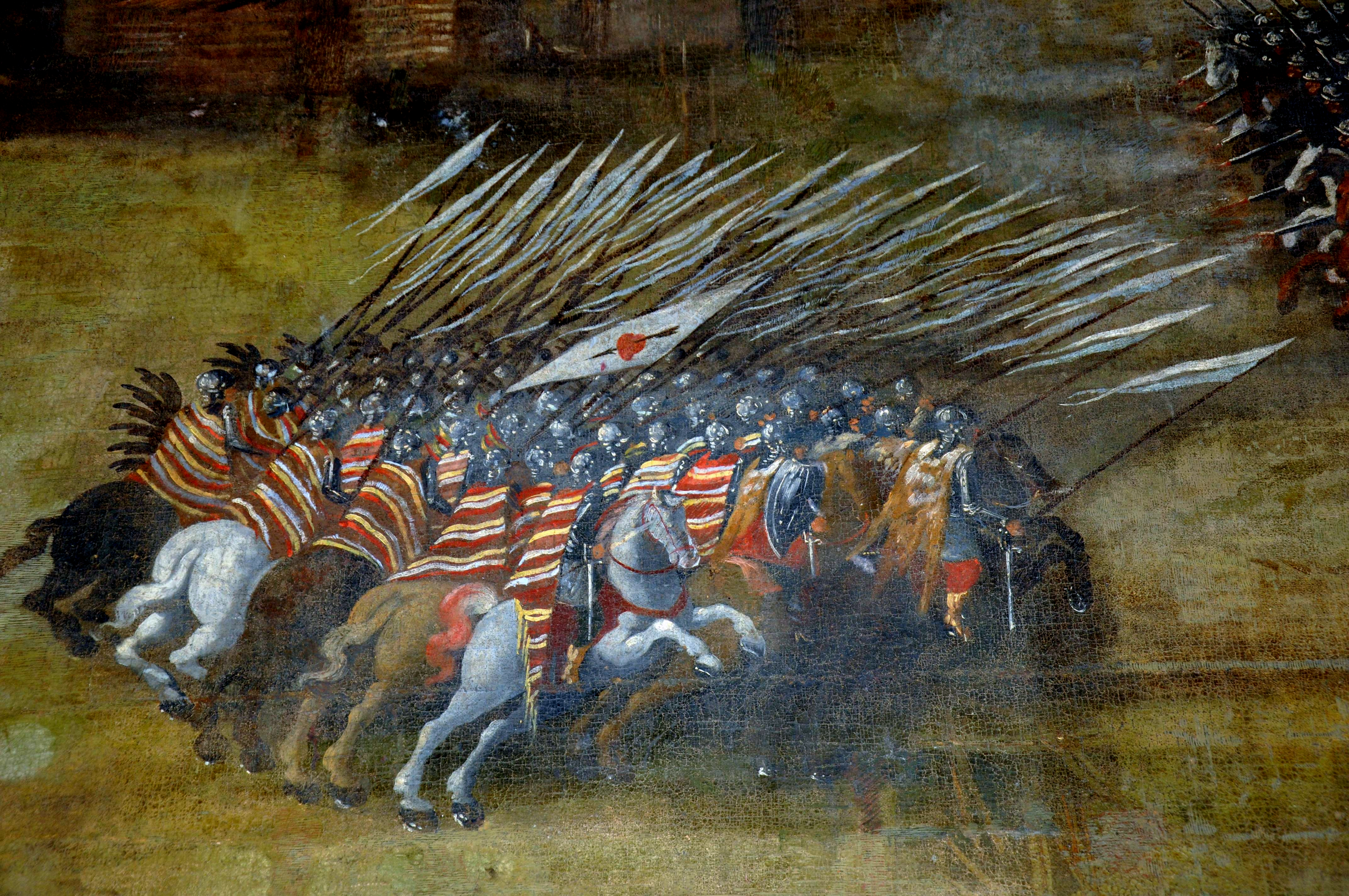
Hussar formation at the Battle of Klushino (1610), painting by Szymon Boguszowicz, 1620.

The hussars represented the heavy cavalry of the Commonwealth. The Towarzysz husarski (Companion) commanded his own poczet (kopia) consisting of two to five similarly armed retainers and other servants (czeladnicy) who tended to his horses, food, supplies, repairs and fodder and often participated in battle. His 'lance' was part of a larger unit known as a banner (chorągiew). Each banner had between 30 and 60 kopia (lances) or more. The commander, per his contractual obligation, was called "rotmistrz", while the de facto commander was often the porucznik (lieutenant). There was also one chorąży (ensign) who carried the banner's flag (chorągiew) and could command the banner when the porucznik was unable to. Each banner had one rotmistrz kopia that was larger than its other lances; this included trumpeters, and musicians (kettle drummers, more trumpeters etc.). There were other towarzysze with duties (keeping order, helping with manoeuvres) within the banner during battle, but their functions are rather poorly understood.

The Polish hussars' primary battle tactic was the mounted charge. They charged at and through the enemy. The charge started at a slow pace and in a relatively loose formation. The formation gradually gathered pace and closed ranks while approaching the enemy, and reached its highest pace and closest formation immediately before engagement. They tended to repeat the charge several times until the enemy formation broke (the Polish hussars had supply wagons with spare lances). The tactic of a charge by heavily armoured hussars and horses was usually decisive for nearly two centuries. The hussars fought with a kopia (lance), a koncerz (stabbing sword), a szabla (sabre), set of two to six pistols, often a carbine or arquebus (known in Polish as a bandolet) and sometimes a warhammer or light battle-axe. The lighter, Ottoman-style saddle allowed for more armour to be used by both the horses and the warriors. Moreover, the horses were bred to be especially fearless and resistant, and they could run quite fast with a heavy load while recovering quickly. They were hybrids of old, Polish equine lineage and eastern horses, usually from Tatar tribes. As a result, a horse could walk hundreds of kilometres loaded with over 100 kg (220 lb) (the hussar with their armour and weapons) and instantly charge. Hussar horses were also very agile and maneuverable. This made hussars able to fight with any cavalry or infantry force from heavy cuirassiers to quick light-armed Tatars. There was a death penalty for selling a hussar horse (sometimes the horses were referred to as "tarpan") to someone outside of Polish–Lithuanian Commonwealth.

== Armour and weaponry ==
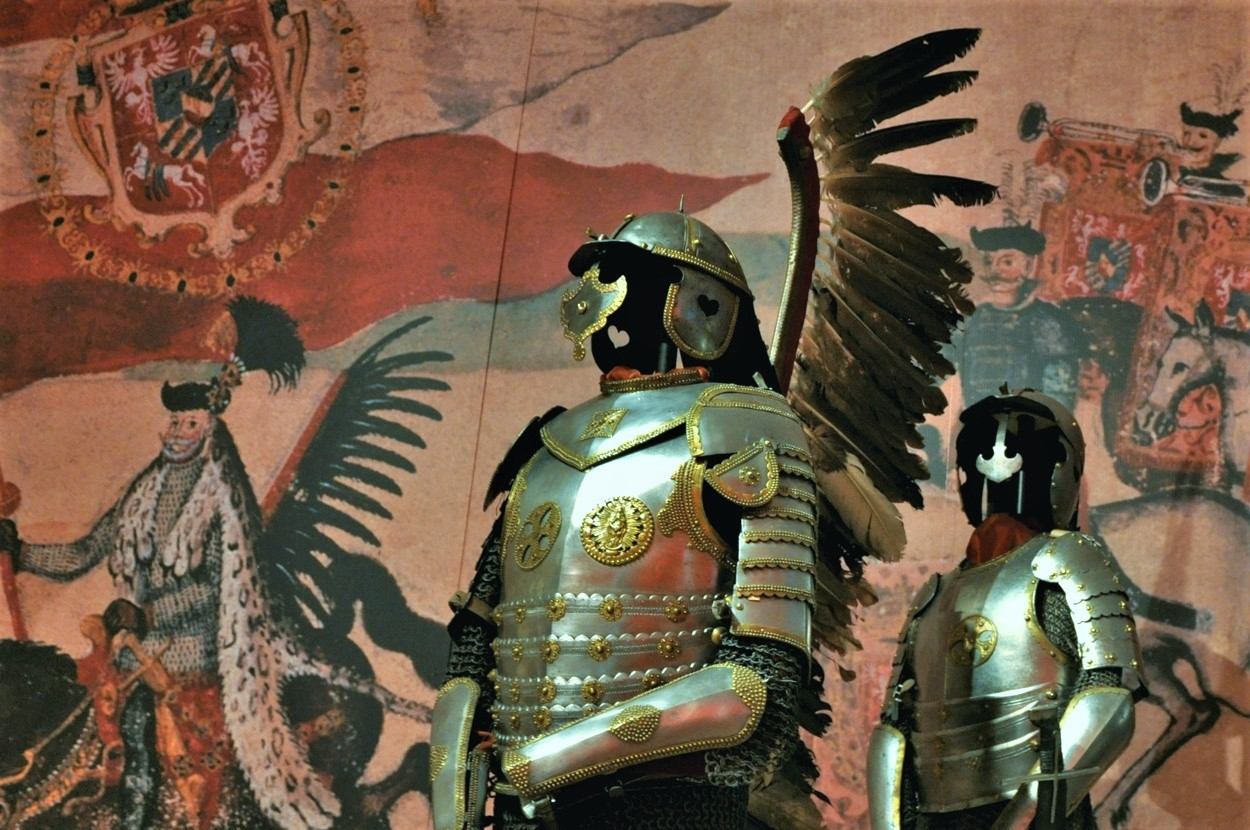
Hussar half-armour from the mid-17th century, National Museum in Kraków.

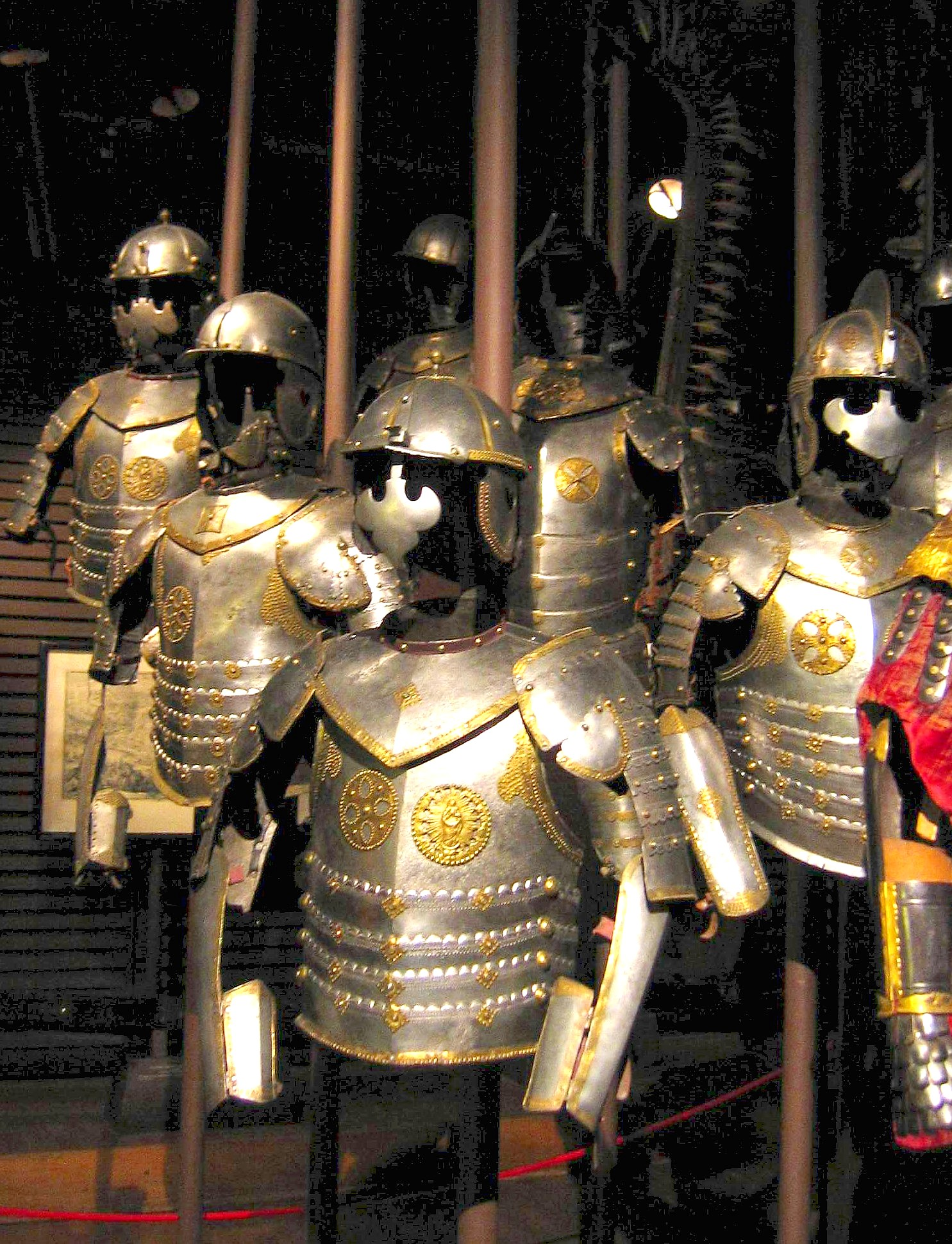
Hussar armour, dating to the first half of the 17th century, Polish Army Museum in Warsaw.

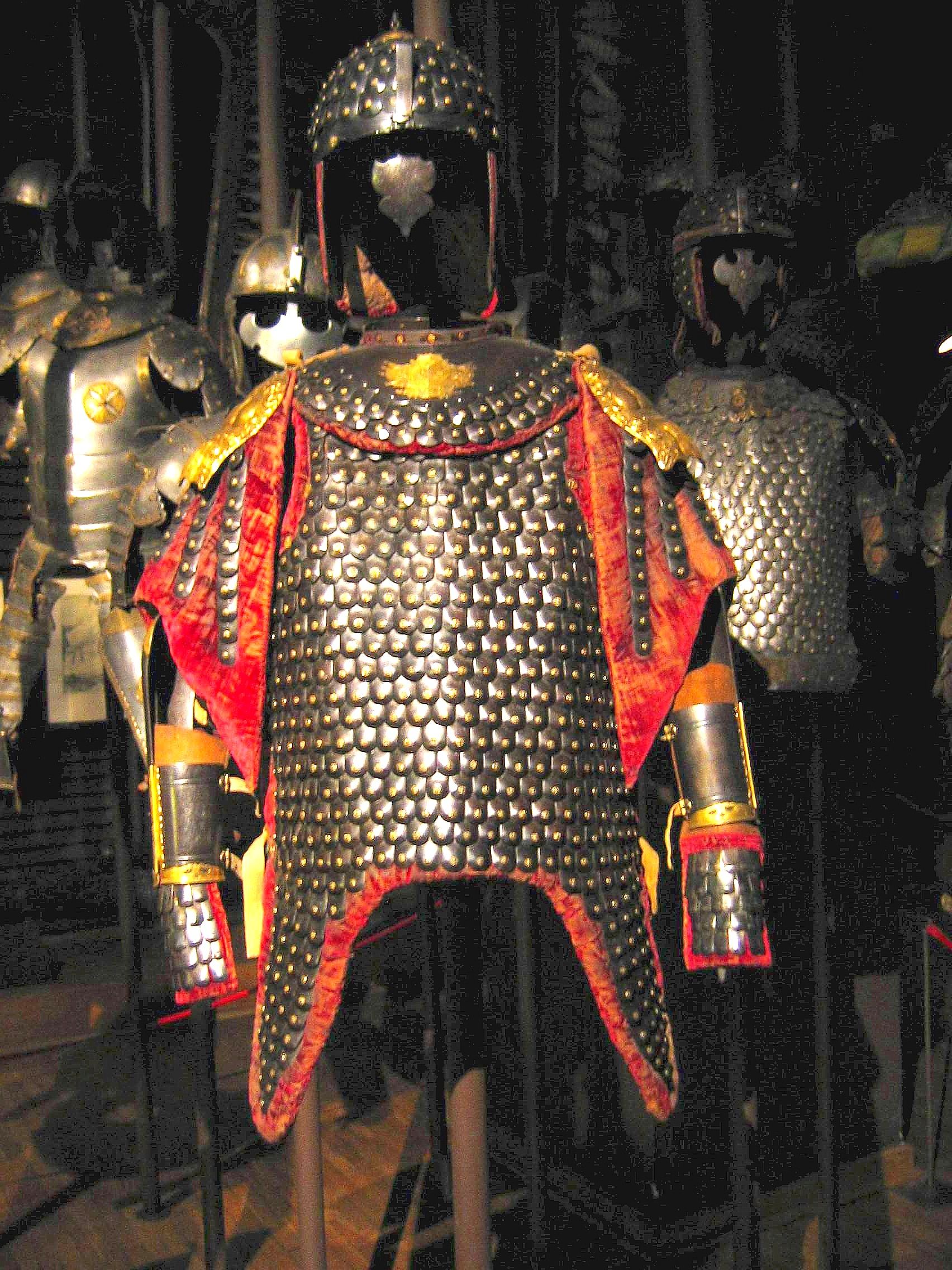
Scale armour of King John III Sobieski.

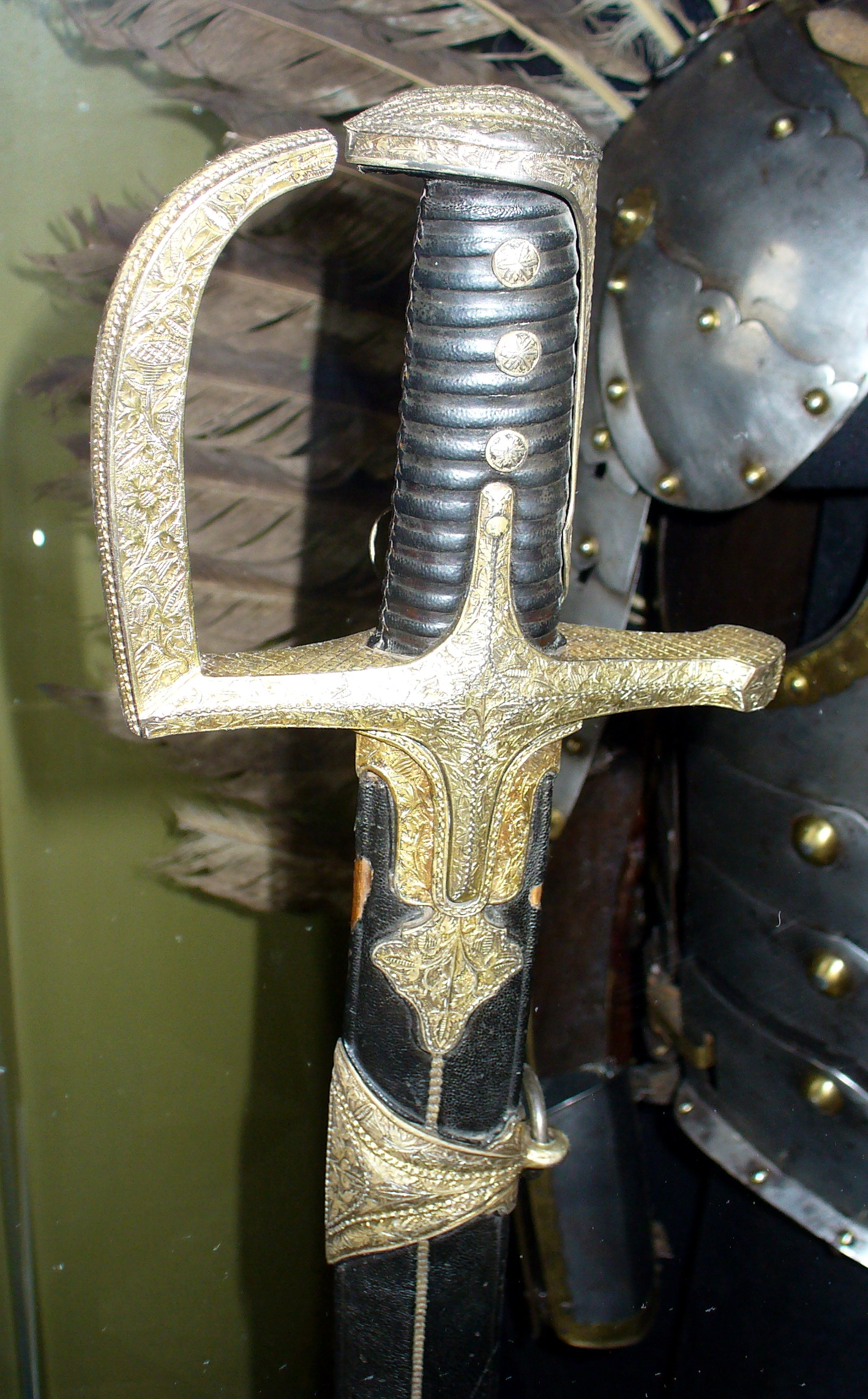
Polish hussar sabre (Polish "szabla").

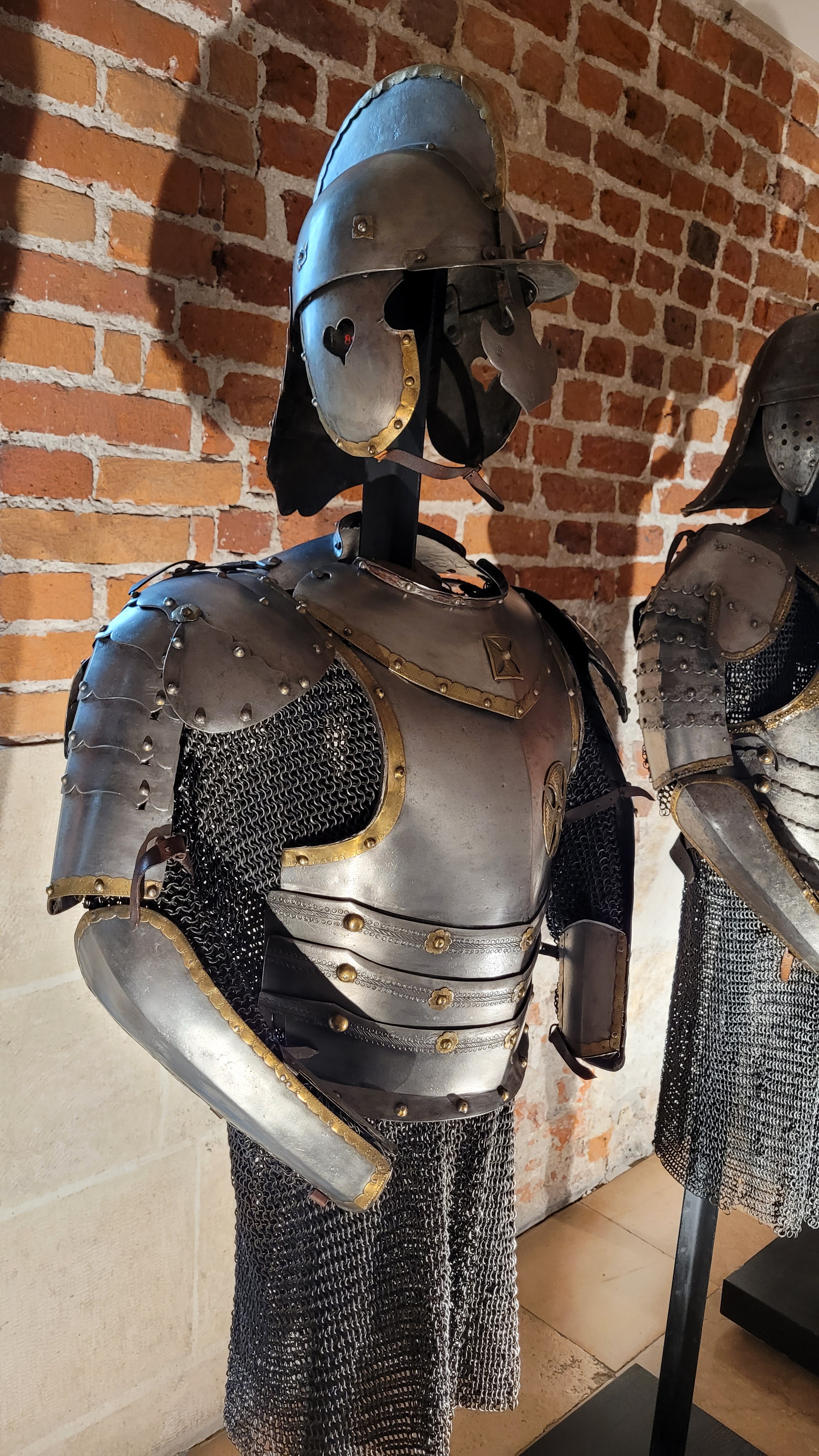
Burgonet-style hussar helmet, Wawel Castle

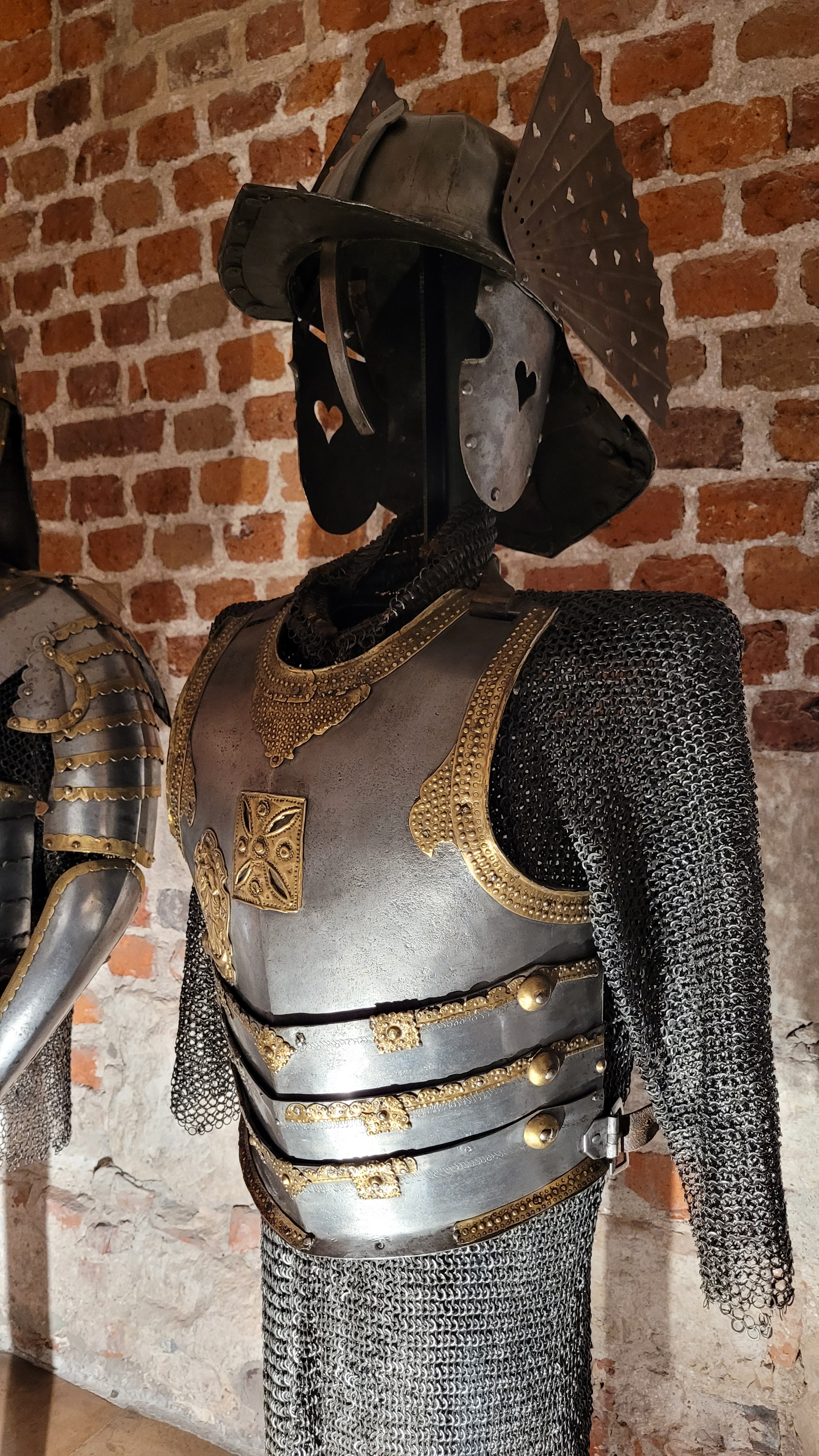
Hussar lobster-tailed pot helmet with side wings, Wawel Castle

The hussars' towarzysz were required to provide the arms and armour for themselves and their retainers, except for the lance which was provided by the King. Each lance's horses also came at each towarzysz husarski's expense. During their heyday, 1574–1705, winged hussars carried the following arms and armour:

The lance was the main offensive weapon of the hussar. The lances were based on the Balkan and Hungarian lances, but Polish lances could have been longer and, like their predecessors from the Balkans and Western Europe, they were hollowed, with two halves glued together and painted, and were often richly gilded. They were commonly made from fir-wood, with the lance point being made from forged steel. They had a gałka, a large wooden ball which served as the handle guard. The hussar's lances usually ranged from 4.5 to 6.2 metres (15 to 20 ft) in length and were provided by the King or the banner's owner, not by the regular soldiers. A large 'silk'/taffeta proporzec pennon was attached to the lance below the point. Another type of lance, known as the demi-lance or kopijka, and was 3 to 3.6 metres (9.8 to 11.8 ft) long and was used against the Tatars and Turks in late-17th-century wars.

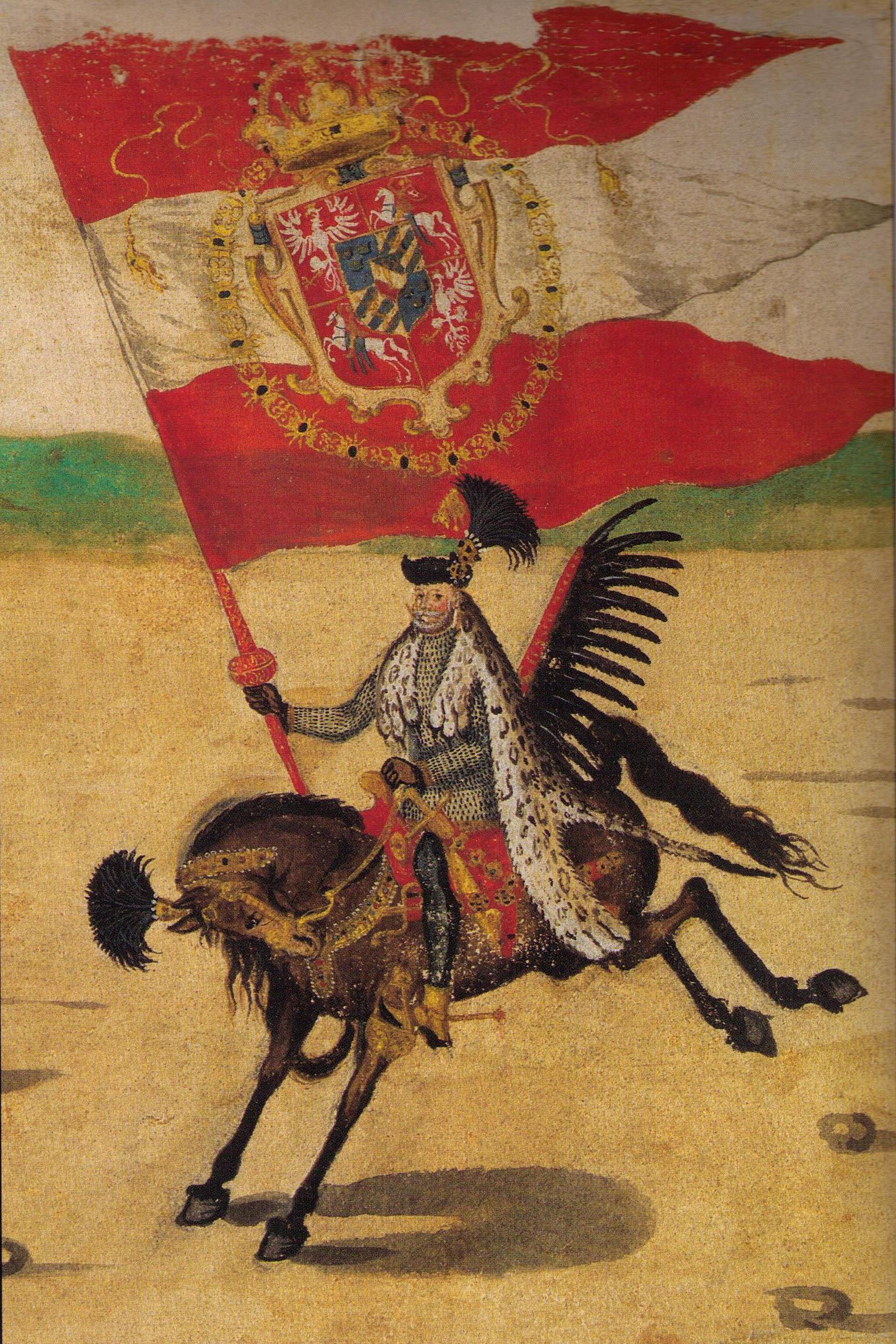
Grand Standard Bearer of the Crown of the Kingdom of Poland (Chorąży Wielki Koronny) on the Stockholm Roll (c. 1605).

The towarzysz husarski carried underneath his left thigh a koncerz (up to 1.5 metres (4.9 ft) in length) and, often, a palasz (a type of broadsword) under his right thigh. The szabla was carried on the left side, and several types of sabres were known to winged hussars, including the renowned szabla husarska.

Hussars sometimes carried additional weapons, such as a 'nadziak' (horseman's pick). Towarzysz husarski carried one or two wheellock (later flintlock) pistols in the saddle holsters, while retainers also might have carried a pistol or light wheellock arquebus or carbine; from the 1680s a carbine for retainers was mandatory.

Individual hussars may have possibly carried a Tatar or Turkish composite bow with arrows in a quiver, especially after the mid-17th century, when many 'pancerny' companions became hussars, and some sources of the late 17th century note the existence of bows amongst the hussar companions. During the first half of the 18th century, while in non-military attire, the hussars' companion carried a bow in a bow case to denote his military status. Yet bows in bow cases were carried by all cavalry officers of the National Army until the reforms of the 1770s, including uhlan units in the Saxon service.

At the height of their prowess, from 1576 to 1653, hussar armour consisted of a comb-like zischagge (szyszak), burgonet or morion helmets with a hemispherical skull, 'cheekpieces' with a heart-shaped cut in the middle, neck-guard of several plates secured by sliding rivets, and adjustable nasal terminating in a leaf-shaped visor. Zischagge and kettle hat helmets for the lower rank (retainers) were often blackened as was their armour. A cuirass (breast plate), back plate, gorget, shoulder guards and of the Great Steppe, Western vambraces with iron glove and later, during the 1630s, the Persian-originated karwasz vambrace, for forearm protection. A towarzysz also could wear tasset hip, cuisse thigh, and poleyn knee protection, underneath a thigh-length coat of mail or specially padded coat with mail sleeves. Retainers usually wore less expensive and older armour, often painted black, and, after the 1670s, might have no cuirass, according to some sources.

The hussar armour was light, usually around 15 kilograms (33 lb), allowing them to be relatively quick and for their horses to gallop at full speed for long periods. Albeit from the 1670s onwards, chain mail was used when fighting the Muslim Tatars in the southeastern borderlands of the Commonwealth. A rarely-used Sarmatian karacena armour (of iron scales riveted to a leather support) might have consisted of a scale helmet, cuirass, gorget, leg and shoulder protection and became popular during the reign of King John Sobieski, but perhaps due to costs and weight, remained popular mostly with the winged hussar commanding officers.

The towarzysz usually wore a leopard (sometimes tiger, jaguar or lion) pelt over his left shoulder, or as often depicted in the surviving Podhorce Castle paintings, he had the exotic pelt underneath his saddle or wrapped around his hips. Wolf, brown bear and lynx pelts were reserved for leaders and veterans (starszyzna).

Koncerz husarski – Koncerz a stabbing type of sword of the Polish hussars, often used against heavily armored opponents.

== Legacy ==
Badge of the Polish 11th Armoured Cavalry Division featuring a stylized hussar wing and helmet.

The Polish hussars are depicted on the commemorative 500 złotych gold coin.

The badge of the Polish Army's 11th Armoured Cavalry Division features a stylized hussar wing and helmet. The Division's patron is Jan III Sobieski, who led the winged hussars at the Battle of Vienna, and the unit's commemorative badge is inscribed with the inherited battle honour "Vienna 1683".

In 2016, the Swedish metal band Sabaton wrote the song "Winged Hussars" for their album The Last Stand. The song is about the Battle of Vienna in 1683 and the hussars' charge which helped defeat the Ottomans.

One, then two for one scene, were featured in the Canadian TV series Murdoch Mysteries, in the 2018 season 11 episode 16 entitled, "Game of Kings".

In 2023, in the Netflix series 1670, Bogdan is seen wearing the winged hussars in Season 1 Episode 1, "The Assembly".

On May 1, 2024, Poland announced that Polish-operated F-35 fighter aircraft will be called "Husarz" in honor of the hussars.

== See also ==
- Polish cavalry
- Towarzysz
- Towarzysz pancerny
- Poczet
- Offices in the Polish–Lithuanian Commonwealth
