= Battle of Khotyn (1673) =

Part of the Polish–Ottoman War of 1672–76

- Part of the Ottoman–Polish War (1672–1676)
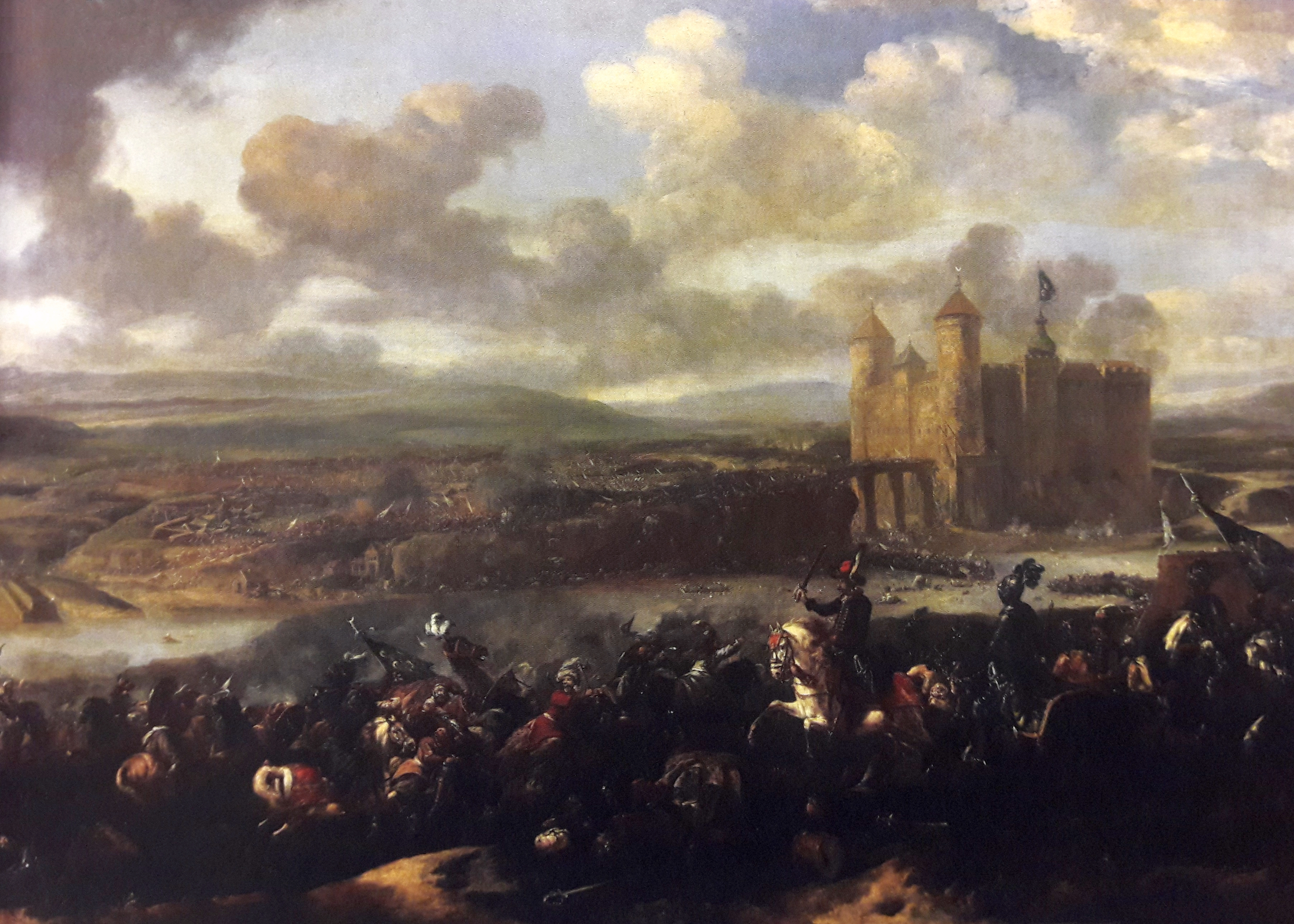
- Painting of the battle by Jan van Huchtenburg in 1675
Date	11 November 1673
Location	Khotyn, Podolian Voivodeship, Polish–Lithuanian Commonwealth 48°29′N 26°30′E
Result	Polish–Lithuanian victory

Belligerents
Polish–Lithuanian Commonwealth	Ottoman Empire

Commanders and leaders
John III Sobieski; Michał Kazimierz Radziwiłł	Hüseyin Pasha

Strength
29,052–30,000	35,000

Casualties and losses
2,000 killed and wounded (Polish sources)	20,000–30,000 killed and wounded (Polish sources)

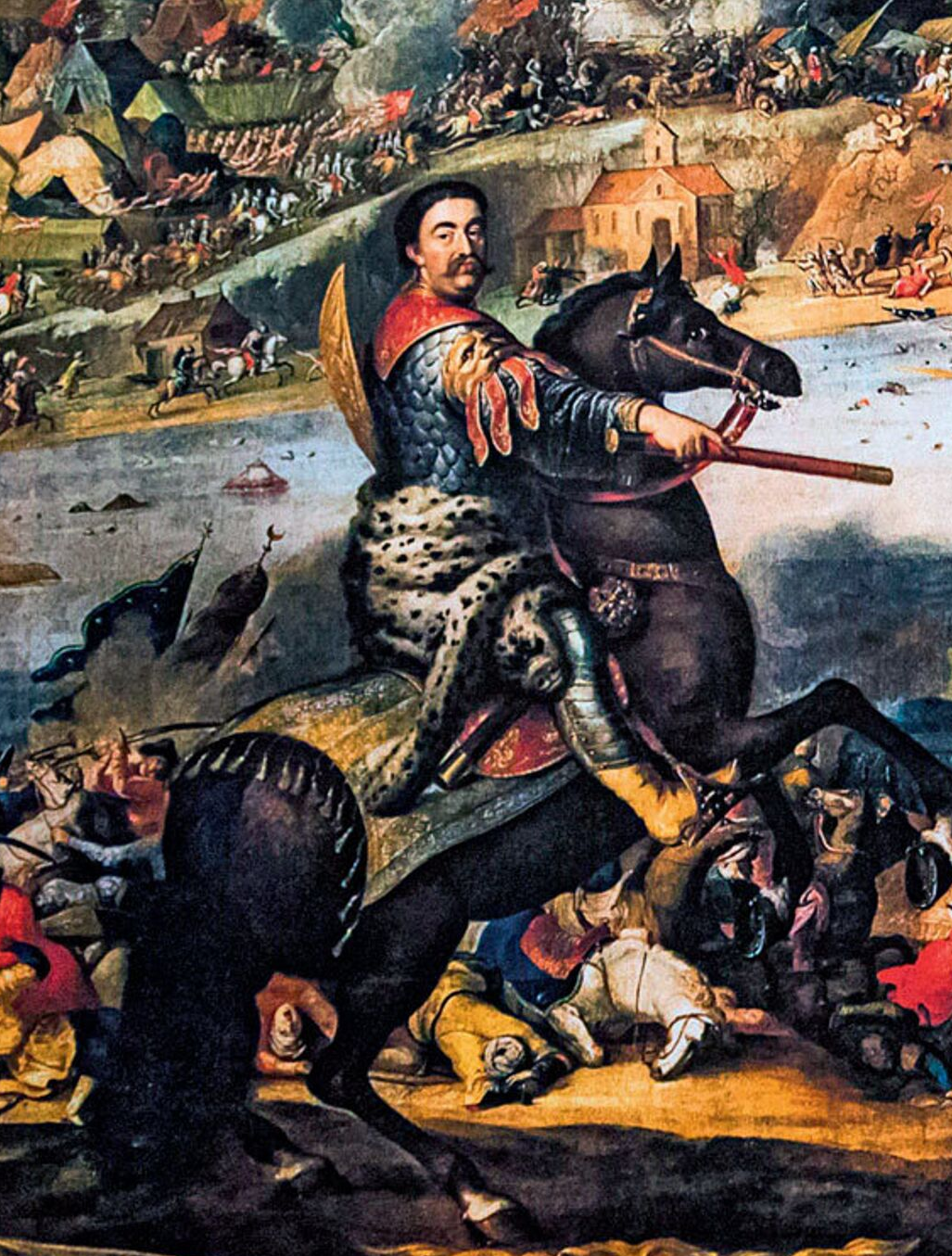
John III Sobieski during the battle

The Battle of Khotyn or Battle of Chocim, also known as the Hotin War, took place on 11 November 1673 in Khotyn, where the forces of the Polish–Lithuanian Commonwealth under the Grand Hetman of the Polish Crown John Sobieski defeated Ottoman Empire forces, with Moldavian and Wallachian regiments, led by Hüseyin Pasha. It reversed the fortunes of the previous year, when Commonwealth weakness led to the signing of the Treaty of Buchach, and allowed John Sobieski to win the upcoming royal election and become the King of Poland.

== Name ==
Khotyn (Polish: Chocim; Romanian: Hotin; Turkish: Hotin; Ukrainian: Хоти́н, romanized: Khotyn) was conquered and controlled by many states, resulting in many name changes. Other name variations include Chotyn, or Choczim (especially in Polish).

== Before the battle ==
The Sultan was unable to assemble an army until the autumn of 1673. As it was impossible to complete the campaign before the onset of cold weather, the assembled troops were ordered to spend the winter in their camps. The army of the Pasha of Silistra was to spend the winter in a camp near the fortress of Khotyn. The army of the Polish-Lithuanian Commonwealth, numbering around 30,000 soldiers commanded by Crown Grand Hetman Jan Sobieski, crossed the Dniester and marched rapidly to the Khotyn Fortress in early November 1673. The fortress was well suited for defense: situated on a bend in the Dniester, with medieval walls reinforced by earthworks, it had been built on the site of a former Polish-Lithuanian camp dating from the War of Khotyn, half a century before this siege. The first attacks on the Ottoman positions took place on 10 November, but these were merely reconnaissance-in-force to ascertain the enemy’s dispositions. The main battle took place the following day, when Sobieski struck the Ottomans, who were exhausted by the inclement weather and lack of sleep.

== Battle ==
The Polish-Lithuanian army, numbering some 30,000 soldiers, under the command of Grand Crown Hetman John Sobieski, besieged the Khotyn fortress in the first days of November 1673. The fortress had natural defensive qualities, as it was located in a bend of the Dniester River. It was protected from the land side by earth ramparts and numerous defensive fortifications built on the site of a former Polish camp from half a century before. The first attacks on the Turkish positions were carried out by Sobieski on November 10, however, they were intended only to reconnoitre the battlefield and the deployment of enemy forces. The actual battle was fought the next day, when Sobieski hit the Turks, tired of the weather and sleeplessness. The Polish-Lithuanian leader took advantage of the fact that the weather was frosty, and the Turks were ill-equipped and unprepared for such weather conditions.

After an all-night branding of the attack by the besiegers, in a strong wind and murderous cold for the Turks, at dawn on November 11 Sobieski personally led his troops to storm the Turkish camp. After a cannon salvo, the infantry and dragoons stormed the ramparts, pushing back the enemy and making room for the cavalry. After which, the hussars, led by Hetman Jabłonowski, rushed through the breaches in the ramparts. The Turks responded with a counterattack by the spahis' cavalry, but the spahis could not withstand the bravado of the hussars' charge, and soon the fighting heated up inside the fortress and the Turkish camp, among the dens of tents. In view of the panic that gripped the Turkish troops, Hussein Pasha ordered an evacuation to the other bank of the Dniester. But the only bridge at Chocim was damaged by Polish-Lithuanian artillery fire and collapsed under the weight of those fleeing. Only a few thousand Turks out of the entire 35,000-strong army managed to get through to Kamieniec Podolski.

The rest of the Turkish troops fell or were taken prisoner. The Polish-Lithuanian losses were much smaller, and a strongly fortified fortress with large supplies of food and war supplies was captured.

The Battle of Khotyn ended with a total victory for the Commonwealth, but it did not bring a breakthrough in the war and did not lead to the recovery of Kamieniec Podolski. On the other hand, the prestige of the Commonwealth in Europe increased, especially the respect for Hetman John Sobieski among the Turks, who henceforth called Sobieski the "Lion of Khotyn."

== Aftermath ==
In consequence of the battle the Ottoman army suffered crippling losses. Its casualties, killed and wounded, numbered two-thirds of its strength. Moreover, Moldavian and Wallachian troops switched sides and decided to support the Commonwealth. The Turkish forces withdrew from Poland after their supplies and most of their artillery were captured but they retained most of western Ukraine. Sobieski and the nobles returned to Warsaw for elections since Michael Wisniowiecki, King of Poland, had died the day before the battle.

== Composition of the Polish–Lithuanian forces ==
- Hussars: 1,670
- Armoured companion: 11,105
- Dragoons: 5,828
- Wallachian cavalry: 1,619
- Arquebusiers: 342
- Infantry: 7,988
- Hungarian infantry: 500

Total: 29,052 soldiers

== Bibliography ==
- Alan Palmer, The Decline and Fall of the Ottoman Empire, Published by Barnes & Noble Publishing, 1992. ISBN 1-56619-847-X.
- Winged Hussars, Radoslaw Sikora, Bartosz Musialowicz, BUM Magazine, 2016.
- Velikanov, Vladimir; Nechitailov, Maxim (2019). Азиатский дракон перед Чигирином [Asian dragon in front of Chigirin] (in Russian). Russian Academy of Sciences: Ratnoe delo. Moscow: Русские витязи. ISBN 978-5-6041924-7-4.
