= Koncerz =

Melee weapon

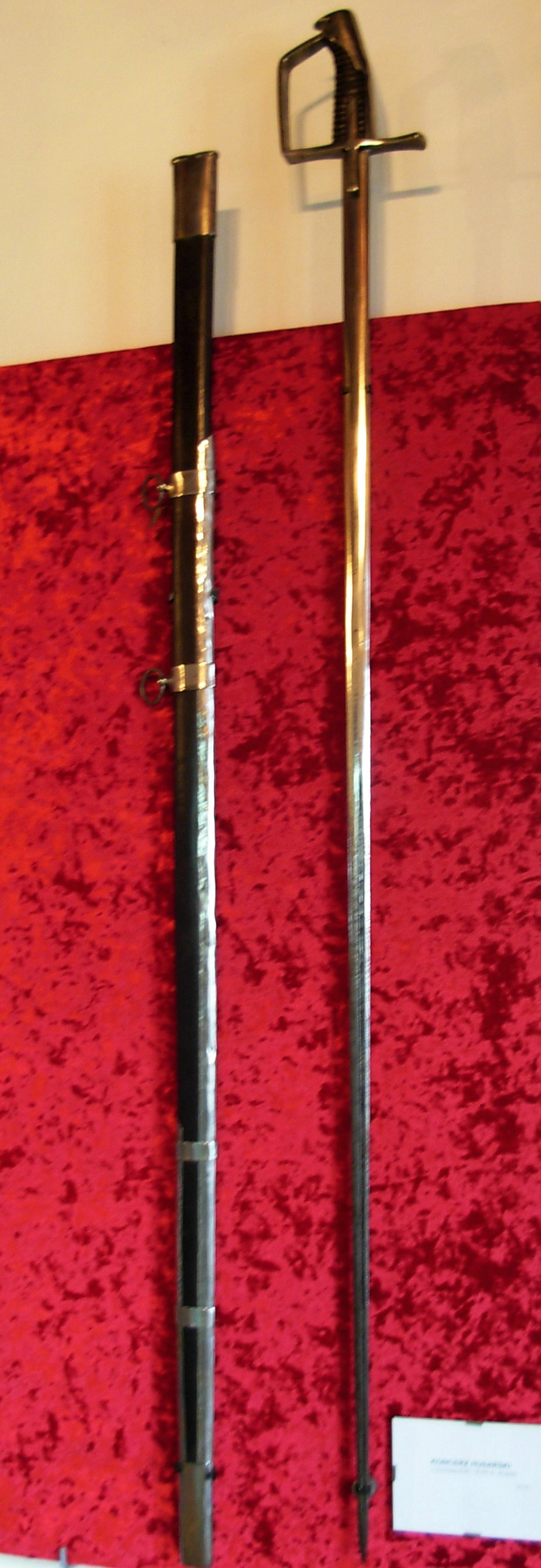
A koncerz with a conventional cutting edge

A koncerz (Polish pronunciation: [ˈkɔn.t͡sɛʂ]) is a type of sword used by Polish-Lithuanian cavalry in the Renaissance period. It is a narrow and long thrusting sword, generally used by a type of heavy cavalry (husaria, the famed Polish hussars) and optimized to defeat body armor, either by piercing directly through the metal links of mail armour or by thrusting at the exposed gaps between the plates of plate armour, but was not used to cut or slash at enemy combatants.

The koncerz originated from a medieval sword and appeared at the end of the 15th century when it was about 1.3 metres (51 in) long, and relatively unwieldy compared to single-handed thrusting swords designed for use by infantry. By the late 16th century, it had increased to 1.6 metres (63 in) in overall length, with a 1.4 metres (55 in) blade length, and optimized for weight distribution and balance. The koncerz was used more like a lance while mounted on horseback; it provided the rider with a very long reach in a relatively compact and portable format that was suitable to carry as a sidearm (the primary weapon of hussars was a kopia, a very long lance). As it was used primarily for thrusting, the koncerz often had no cutting edge, only a very sharp point; the blade itself was triangular or square in cross section in order to be more rigid.

The closest Western European equivalent is the long two-handed thrusting sword, known as an estoc, or 'tuck'.

== Historical use ==
=== Historical development ===
The koncerz appeared in Turkey, Hungary, and parts of Western Europe during the 15th century. Three regional varieties are generally distinguished: Turkish, Hungarian, and Western European, with the Polish form becoming particularly associated with the cavalry of the Polish-Lithuanian Commonwealth. Early examples from the 14th and 15th centuries resembled conventional swords, with straight crossguards and sword-like hilts. During the 16th and 17th centuries, the weapon developed into a longer, lighter thrusting sword, with a narrow blade and a triangular or quadrilateral cross-section.

The estoc, identified in Polish sources by the names *koncerz* or *granat*, had a narrow, rigid blade with a triangular or rhomboidal cross-section, designed to penetrate plate armour. It was known in Europe by the mid-13th century and became more widespread during the following century. A study of Polish mercenary records indicates that the weapon was used by a small number of infantrymen in 1471, although it does not appear in the surviving records of mercenary cavalry.

=== Design and use ===
The koncerz was designed primarily for thrusting rather than cutting. Its blade could reach approximately 1.6 metres in length and was generally too narrow and thin for effective slashing. The weapon was used on horseback and was commonly attached to the side of the saddle, beneath the rider's thigh, rather than carried at the waist. It served as a secondary weapon when a cavalryman's lance broke or when there was insufficient space to carry out a full lance charge.

The Polish koncerz was a straight, pointed sword approximately six to seven feet long. It was attached to the saddle beneath the rider's left thigh and was used by Polish heavy cavalry from the 15th to the 17th century, particularly against fallen or dismounted opponents. Historical descriptions also associate the weapon with Turkish military equipment.

=== Regional use ===
In 17th-century Poland, the term *granat* was also used for a type of koncerz with a smaller hilt and a triangular blade. Hungarian cavalry also used the weapon, including during the uprising led by Francis II Rákóczi (1703–1711). An inventory from 1708 reportedly listed eight koncerz.

The weapon became closely associated with Polish hussars, who carried it alongside the lance and sabre. Polish historical descriptions identify it as a characteristic component of the heavy cavalry's equipment, with surviving examples displaying long, often triangular or quadrilateral blades.

== See also ==
- Pattern 1908 cavalry sword
