= Krzysztof "Piorun" Radziwiłł =

Polish–Lithuanian noble (1547–1603)

Krzysztof "Piorun" Radziwiłł Grand Hetman of Lithuania
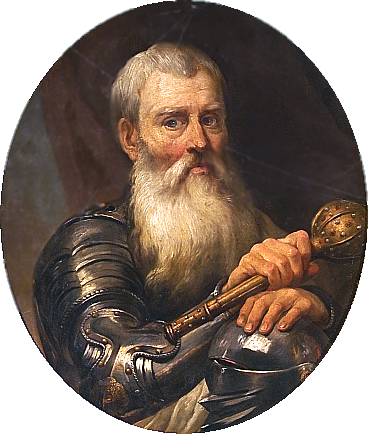
- Born: 11 July 1547; Vilnius, Grand Duchy of Lithuania
- Died: 20 March 1603 (aged 55); Łosośna, Kingdom of Poland
- Board member of: Calvinist
- Spouse(s): Katarzyna Sobek z Sulejówka h. Brochwicz; Katarzyna Ostrogska; Katarzyna Tęczyńska; Elżbieta Ostrogska
- Children: with Katarzyna Ostrogska: Janusz Radziwiłł with Katarzyna Tęczyńska: Krzysztof Radziwiłł; Halaszka Radziwiłł
- Parent(s): Mikołaj Radziwiłł the Red; Katarzyna Tomicka

Prince Krzysztof Radziwiłł, epithet "Piorun" ("Lightning") (Lithuanian: Kristupas Radvila „Perkūnas“, 11 July 1547 – 20 March 1603) was a Reichsfürst of the Holy Roman Empire and a member of the nobility of the Polish–Lithuanian Commonwealth.

He was cup-bearer of Lithuania from 1569; Field Lithuanian Hetman from 1572; Castellan of Trakai, Deputy Chancellor of Lithuania from 1579; Voivode of Vilnius from 1584; Grand Lithuanian Hetman from 1589; and Starost.

== Life ==
Radziwiłł family coat of arms: Trąby

Radziwiłł was one of the most talented commanders in the service of the Polish–Lithuanian Commonwealth during the wars against Muscovy and Sweden, and won the Battle of Kokenhausen. He received the epithet "Piorun" (translated as "Lightning" or "Thunderbolt") for his deadly and very successful cavalry raids against Ivan the Terrible's forces in Russian Tsardom territory during the Livonian War, forcing it to capitulate.

His achievements, combined with his powerful Radziwiłł family backing, helped him rise to his various voivode and starost offices and further increased his family's wealth.

Like his father, brother, and nephew, he was an ardent Calvinist and adherent of the Polish Reformed Church, and defended it against the rise of the Counter-Reformation.
