= Giacomo Lauro =

Italian painter

Giacomo Lauro (1550–1605), also called Giacomo da Treviso, was an Italian painter, of the late Renaissance, active mainly in his native Venice and Treviso. He was a follower of Paolo Veronese. He painted a St. Roch interceding for victims of the plague. He died in Treviso.
