= Hunting sword =

Single-handed sword used for finishing hunted game

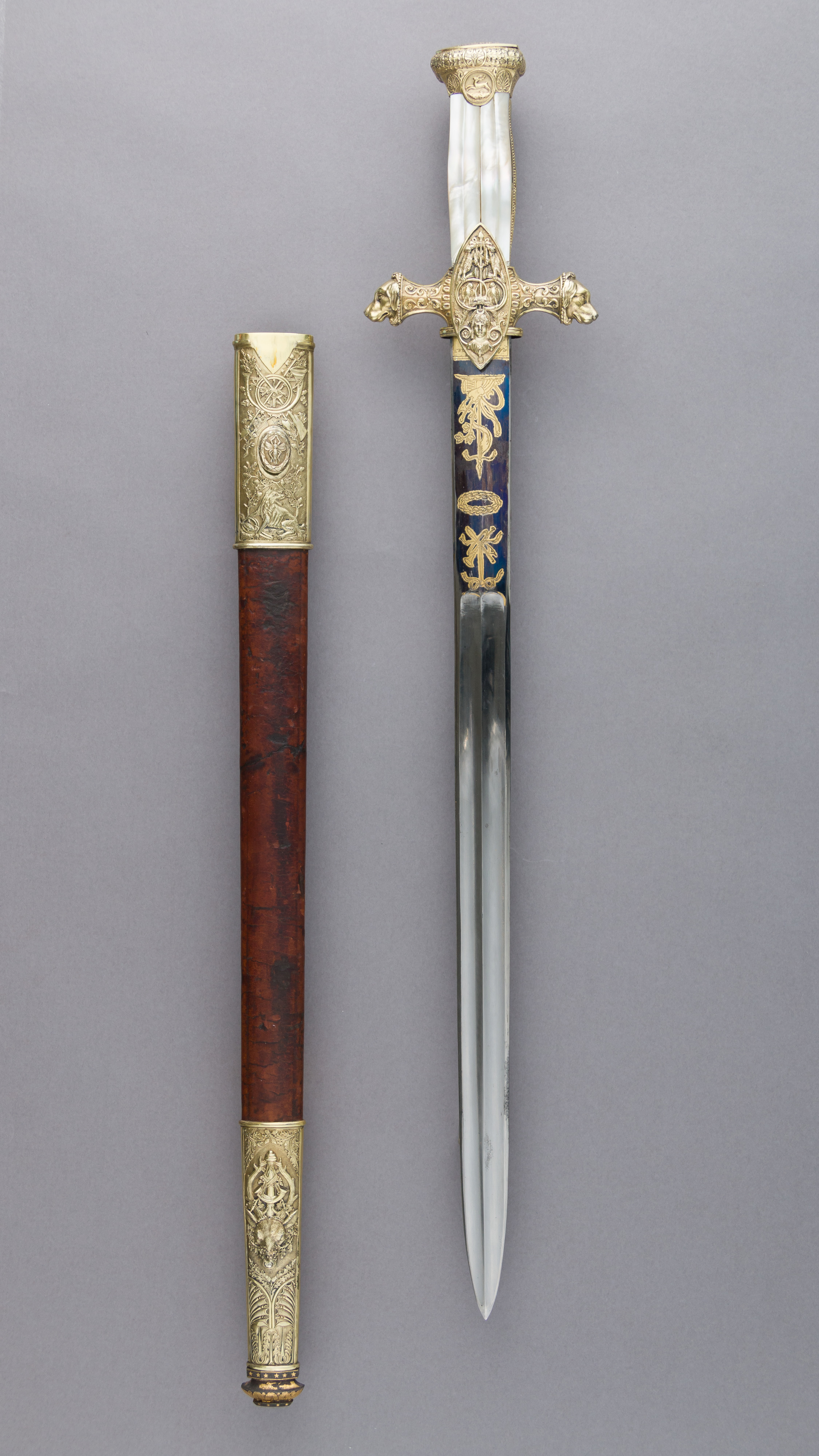
Hunting sword of Prince Camillo Borghese (1775–1832)

A hunting sword is a type of single-handed short sword that dates back to the 12th century, but was primarily used during hunting parties in Europe from the 17th to the 19th century. A hunting sword usually has a straight, single-edged, pointed blade typically no more than 36 in (910 mm) long. This sword was used for finishing off game in lieu of using and wasting further shot. Adopted by many Europeans, and in past centuries sometimes worn by military officers as a badge of rank, hunting swords display great variety in design. Some hilts featured a thin knuckle-bow to protect the fingers. Others sported a serrated saw edge on the back of the blade. Still others were pistol swords, originating in the early 18th century with small matchlock guns built into the hilt and deep firing grooves cut into the fuller of the blade.
