= Military of the Polish–Lithuanian Commonwealth =

Overview of the Polish–Lithuanian Commonwealth's military

Polish–Lithuanian Commonwealth coat of arms

The military of the Polish–Lithuanian Commonwealth consisted of two separate armies of the Kingdom of Poland's Crown Army and the Grand Duchy of Lithuania's Grand Ducal Lithuanian Army following the 1569 Union of Lublin, which joined to form the bi-conderate elective monarchy of the Polish–Lithuanian Commonwealth. The army of each country was commanded by their respective Hetmans. A distinctive formation of both armies were the Winged hussars. The Polish–Lithuanian Commonwealth Navy never played a major role and ceased to exist in 1643.

Commonwealth forces were engaged in numerous conflicts in the south (against the Ottoman Empire), the east (against the Tsardom of Muscovy and later, the Russian Empire) and the north (the Kingdom of Sweden); as well as internal conflicts (most notably, numerous Cossack uprisings). For the first century or so, the Commonwealth military was usually successful, but became less so from around the mid-17th century. Plagued by insufficient funds, it found itself increasingly hard-pressed to defend the country, and inferior in numbers to the growing armies of the Commonwealth's neighbors.

Following the Commonwealth's end, the Commonwealth military traditions would be continued by Napoleonic Polish Legions and the Army of the Duchy of Warsaw.

== Background ==
The Commonwealth was formed at the Union of Lublin of 1569 from the Kingdom of Poland and Grand Duchy of Lithuania. The armies of those states differed from the organization common in western Europe, as according to Bardach, the mercenary formations (Polish: wojsko najemne), common there, never gained popularity in Poland. Brzezinski, however, notes that foreign mercenaries did form a significant portion of the more elite infantry units, at least till the early 17th century. In 15th-century Poland, several other formations formed the core of the military. There was a small standing army, obrona potoczna ("continuous defense") about 1,500–3,000 strong, paid for by the king, and primarily stationed at the troubled south and eastern borders. It was supplemented by two formations mobilized in case of war: the pospolite ruszenie (levée en masse – feudal levy of mostly noble knights-landholders), and the wojsko zaciężne, recruited by the Polish commanders for the conflict (it differed from Western mercenary formations in that it was commanded by Polish officers, and dissolved after the conflict has ended).

Several years before the Union of Lublin, the Polish obrona potoczna was reformed, as the Sejm (national parliament of Poland) legislated in 1562–1563 the creation of wojsko kwarciane (named after kwarta tax, levied on the royal estate in royal lands for the purpose of maintaining this formation). This formation was also paid for by the king, and in the peacetime, numbered about 3,500–4,000 men according to Bardach; Brzezinski gives the range of 3,000–5,000. It was composed mostly of the light cavalry units manned by nobility (szlachta) and commanded by hetmans. Often, in wartime, the Sejm would legislate a temporary increase in the size of the wojsko kwarciane.

== Operational history ==
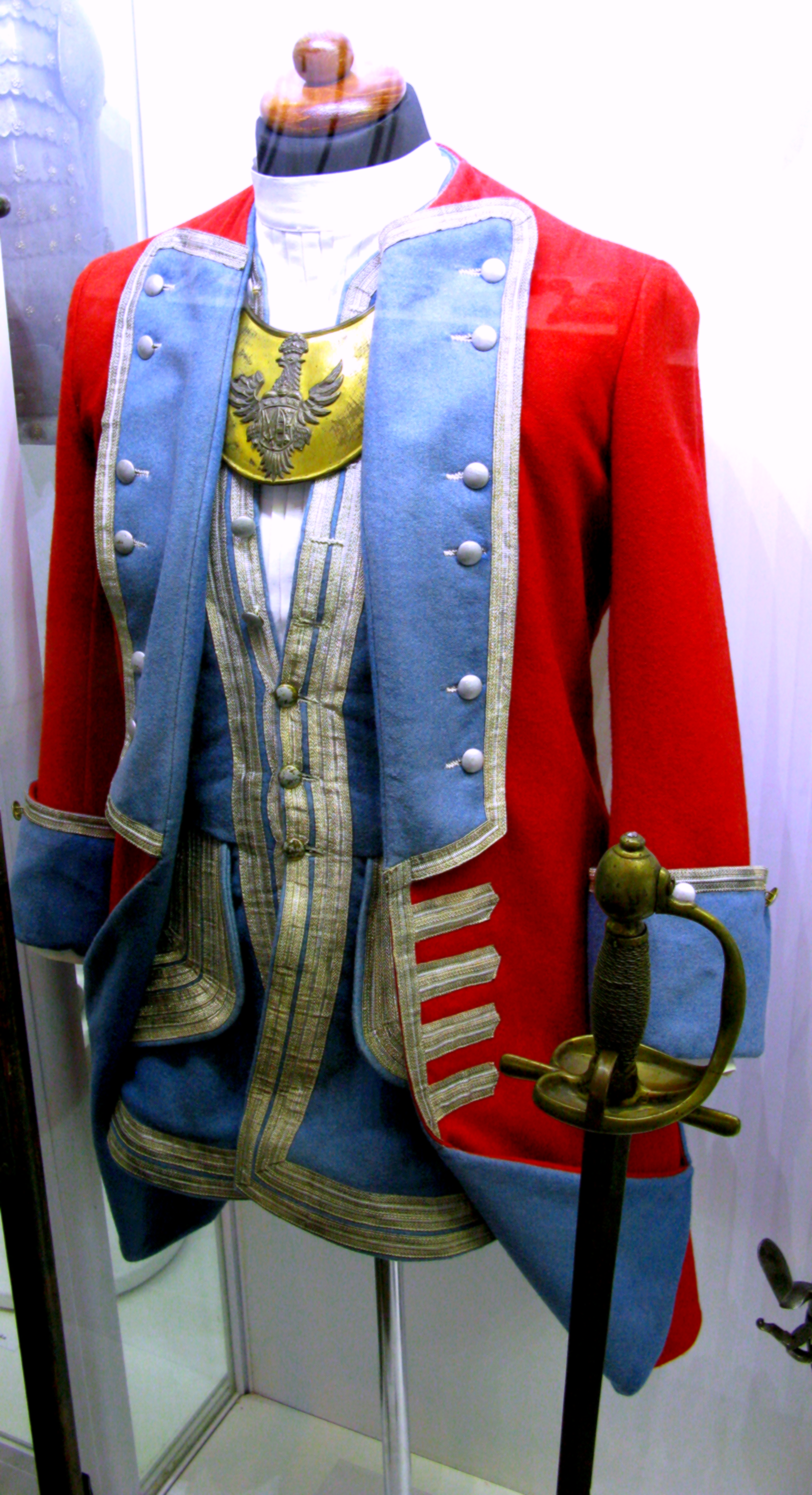
Officer's uniform of Royal Polish Guard, 1732

At its heyday, the Commonwealth comprised parts of the territories of present-day Poland, Lithuania, Ukraine, Belarus, Latvia, Estonia, and Russia. It was engaged in the struggles along most of its borders, with only the Western border with the Holy Roman Empire's lands being relatively peaceful. In its first decades, major conflicts included the Livonian campaign of Stephen Báthory, the interventions in Moldavia, the Danzig rebellion, and the War against Sigismund.

The early 17th century saw a number of wars against Swedish, the Ottoman, and Russian forces (Dymitriads, the Smolensk War). The Commonwealth also suffered from many Cossack uprisings, culminating in the devastating Khmelnytsky Uprising of 1648. That period also saw some of the Commonwealth's most talented military commanders: Stanisław Żółkiewski (1547–1620), Jan Karol Chodkiewicz (1560–1621), Stanisław Koniecpolski (1593–1646) and Stefan Czarniecki (1599–1665). The Commonwealth managed to survive these conflicts, and scored several major victories on all fronts, such as the Battle of Kircholm, the Battle of Klushino, and had captured Moscow in 1612. However, the Khmelnytsky Uprising, together with the Polish–Russian War (1654–1667) and the Swedish Deluge, all taking place around the same period of the 1650s, crippled the country, resulting in a loss of most of Ukraine to Russia in the Truce of Andrusovo in 1667. In 1683, the Commonwealth scored its last major victory that resounded on the European scene, the relief of Vienna by King John III Sobieski.

During the 18th century, European powers (mostly Russia, Sweden, Prussia, and Saxony) fought several wars for the control of the territories of the Polish–Lithuanian Commonwealth, particularly during the Great Northern War. By the 18th century's end, internal conflicts involving foreign enemies, such as the War of the Bar Confederation, led to the dissolution and partitioning of the Polish–Lithuanian Commonwealth among its neighbours. The final attempts at maintaining the Commonwealth's independence, including the political reforms of the Great Sejm, failed militarily, with the defeats in the Polish–Russian War of 1792 and the Kościuszko Uprising of 1794 ultimately ending in Poland-Lithuania's final partition and the final dissolution of the remains of the Polish–Lithuanian Commonwealth.

== Composition ==
Polish–Lithuanian military 1576-1795
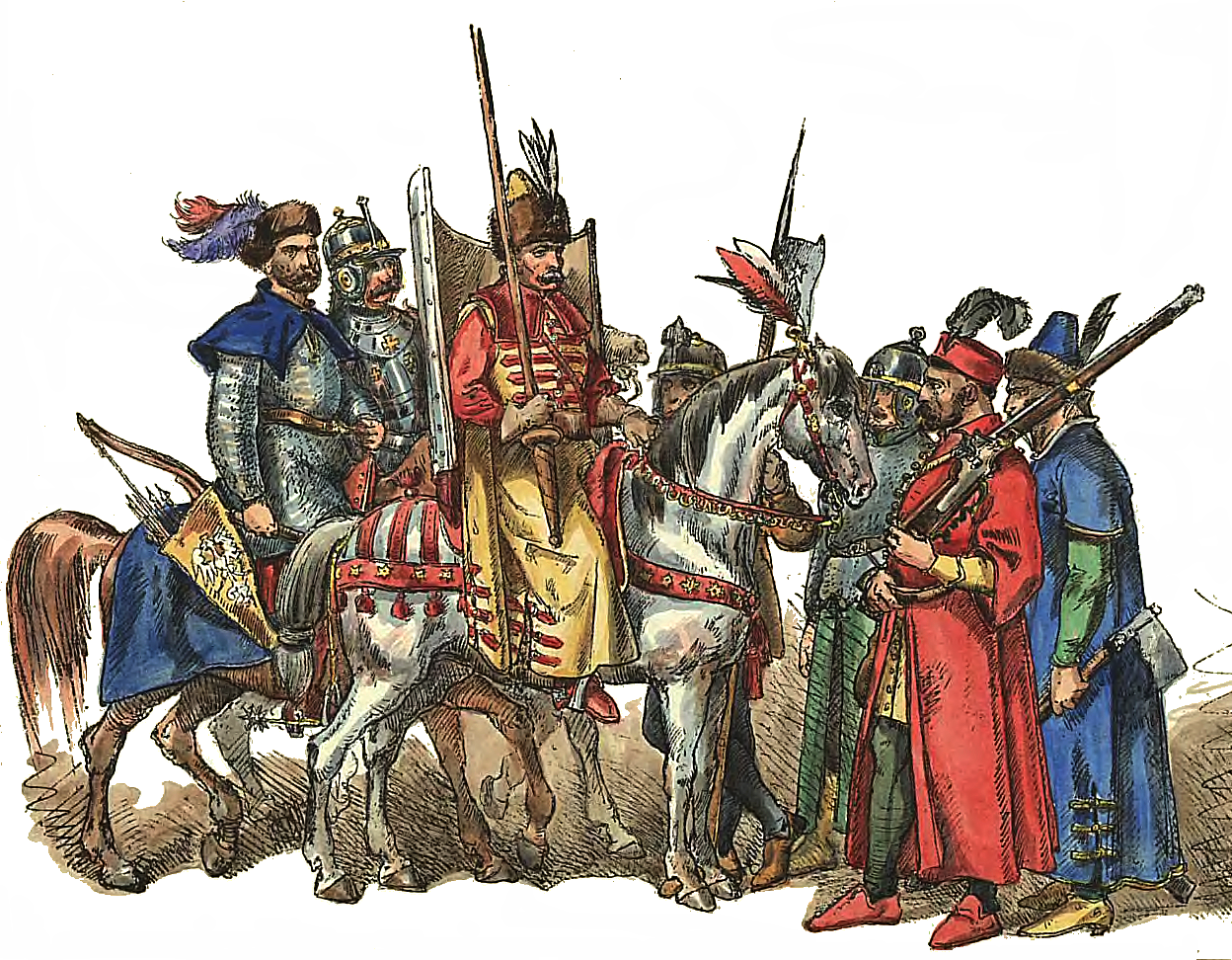
Polish–Lithuanian military men, 1576–1586. Painting by Jan Matejko

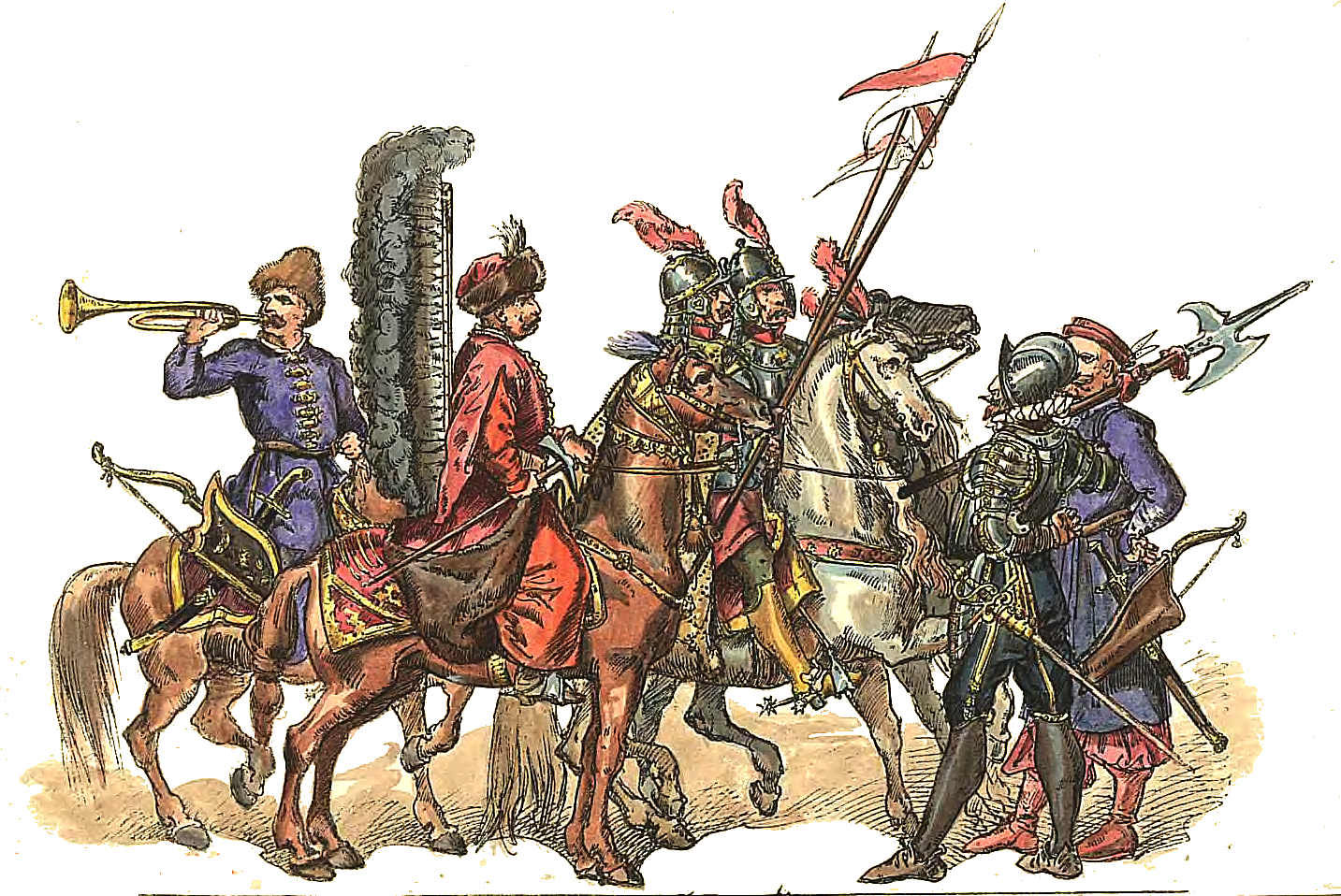
Polish–Lithuanian military men, 1588–1632. Painting by Jan Matejko

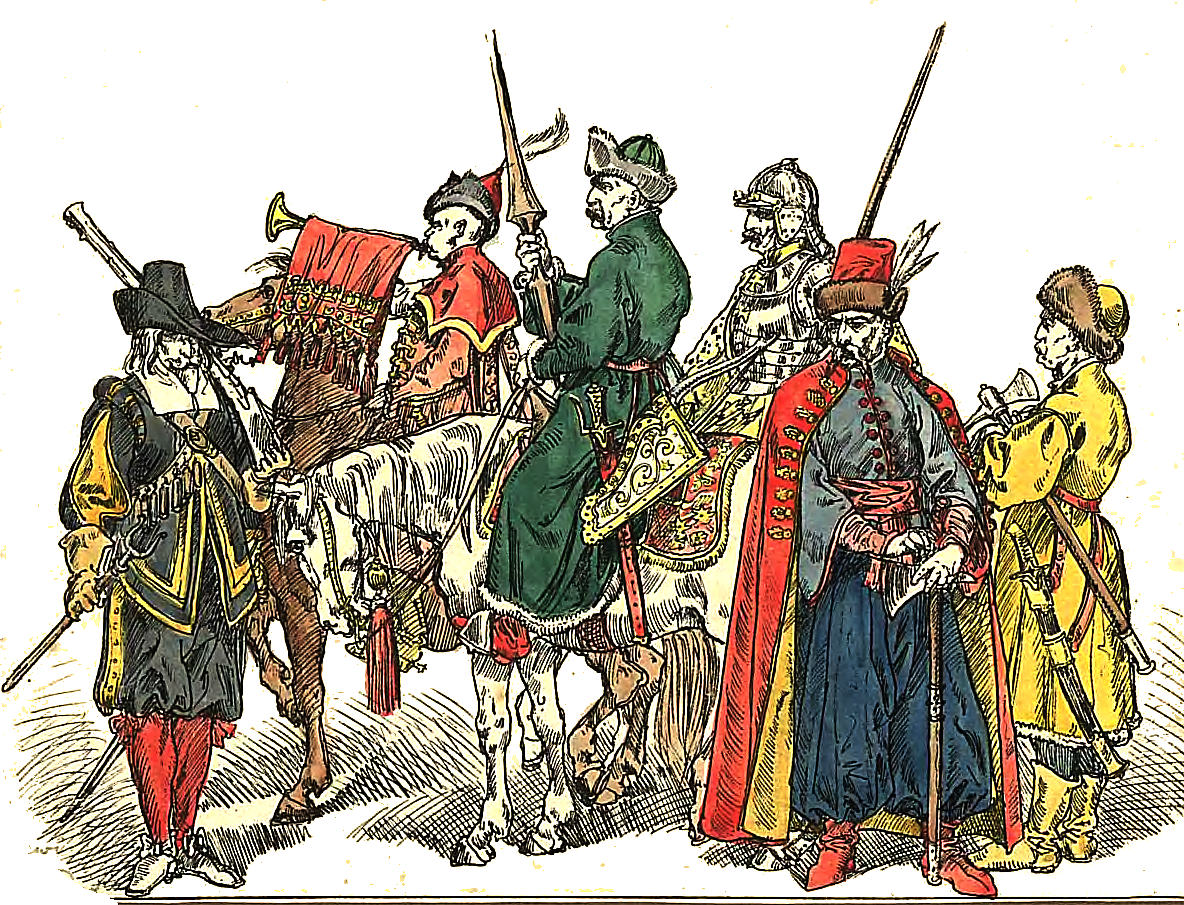
Polish–Lithuanian military men, 1633–1668. Painting by Jan Matejko

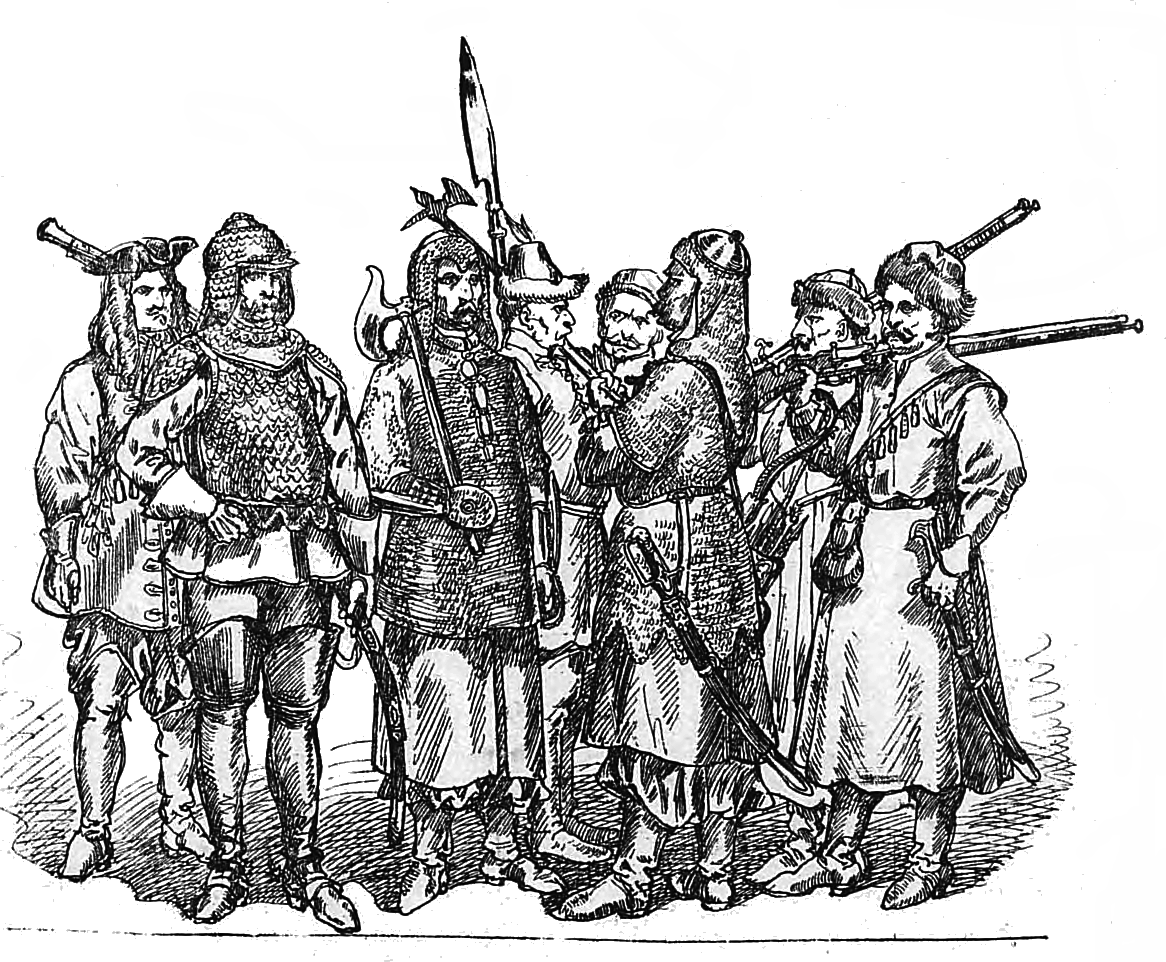
Polish–Lithuanian military men, 1674–1696. Painting by Jan Matejko

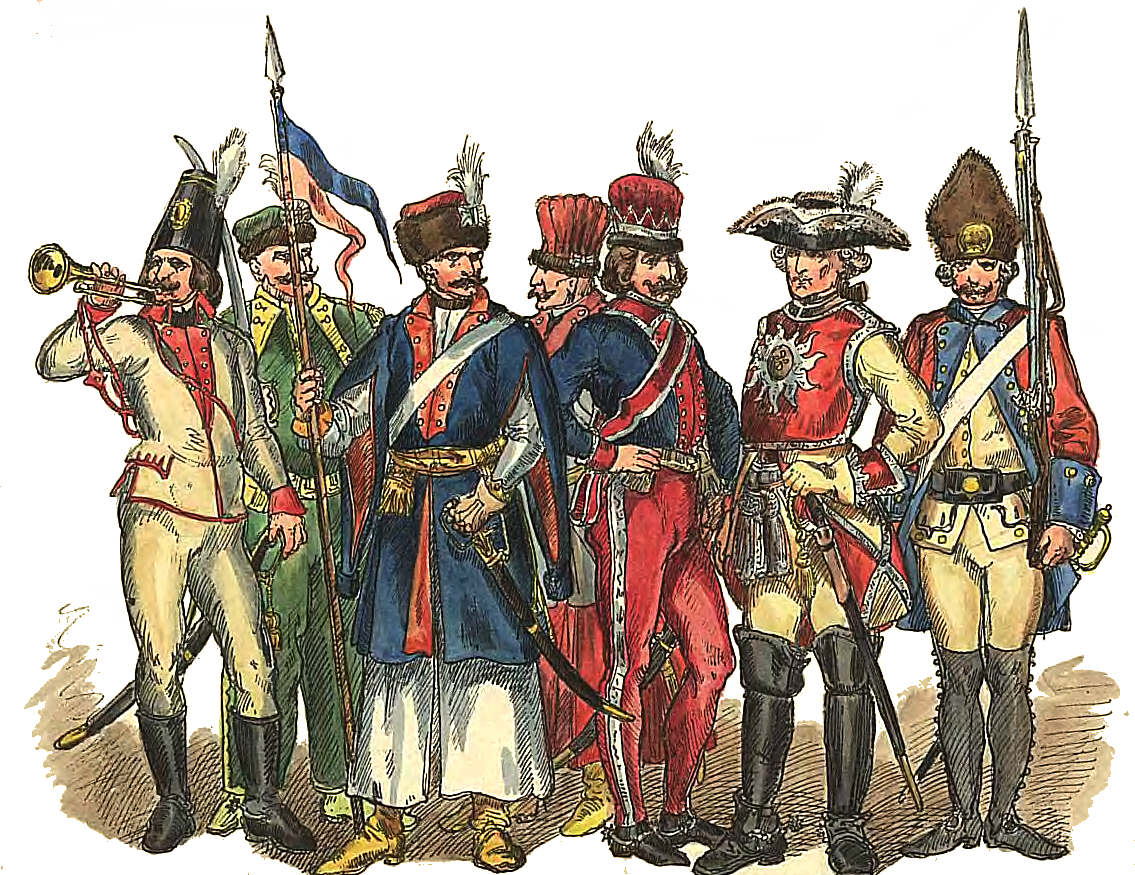
Polish–Lithuanian military men, 1697–1795. Painting by Jan Matejko

=== Organization ===
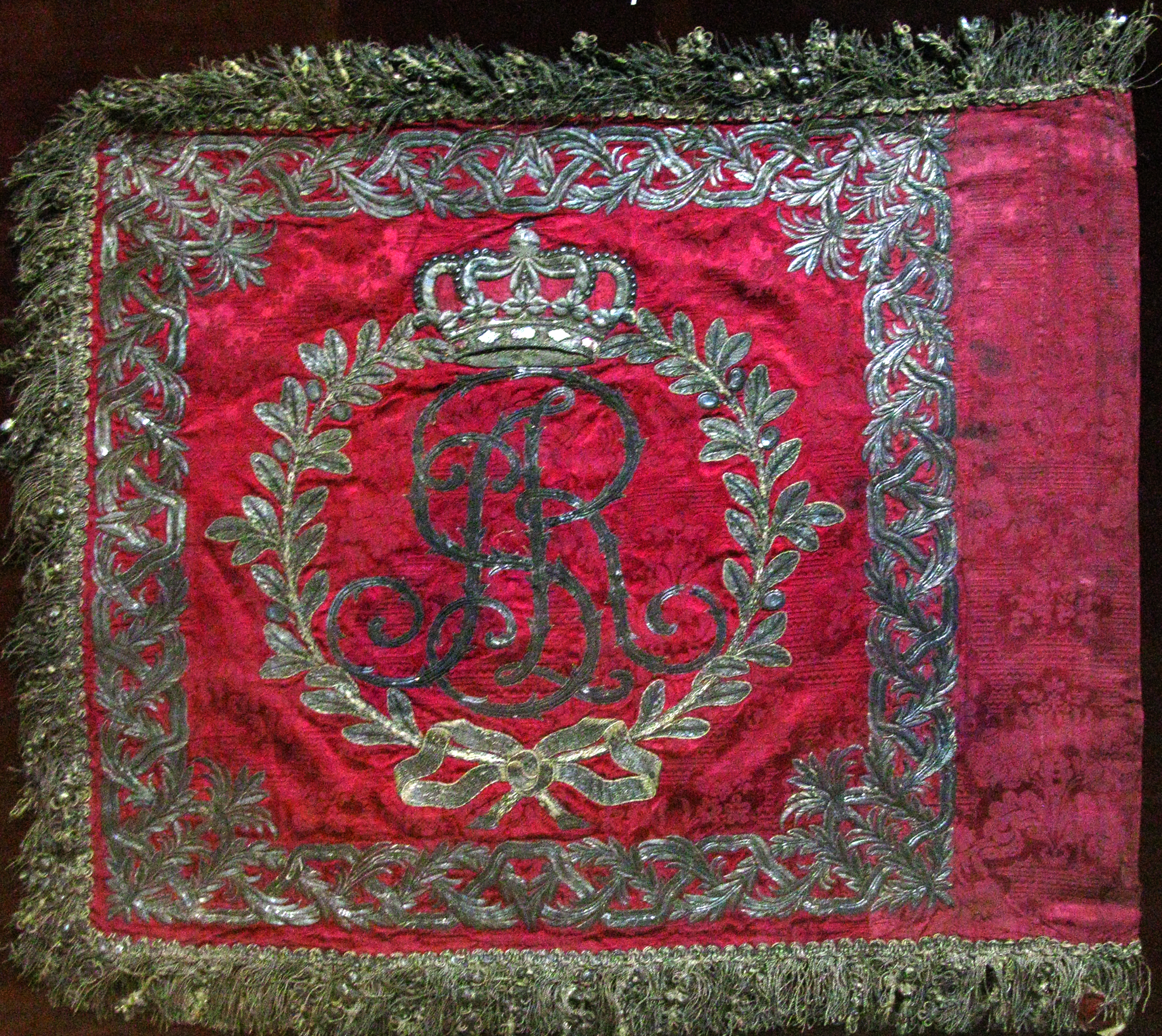
Banner of the Polish–Lithuanian cavalry's squadron.

When the Commonwealth was formed, there was little practical difference between the Polish and Lithuanian armed forces but they were kept separate; the Lithuanian army formed about a fourth to a third of the Commonwealth's military. The Commonwealth's military was divided into national and foreign contingents (Polish: autorament). The name applied to different unit types, regulations and the officer cadres; the majority of regular recruits for both came from within the Commonwealth, particularly from the 1630s onward. National units included the Winged hussars and lighter Polish pancerni and Lithuanian petyhorcy with some light cavalry units, with infantry being the distant second in reputation; whereas the foreign units centered around infantry and artillery formations, with dragoons gaining prominence from the 1620s, and reiter cavalry soon afterward.

The national contingent was organized in traditional formations dating back to the earlier Middle Ages, with chorągiew, commanded by a rotmistrz and composed of smaller poczet (lance) retinues, each composed of one towarzysz and a varying number of aides. The chorągiew's size varied from as little as 60 to as many as 300 men. Two or more choragwie (though rarely more than a dozen, and never more than about forty) formed a pułk, a type of a unit similar to the medieval battle or modern division or corps, which was led by the pułkownik. The foreign contingent was organized into regiments, often numbering around 500–1,000, and divided into companies. King John III Sobieski attempted in the 1670s to replace the national-foreign contingent divisions with a single structure, dividing units into infantry, cavalry and dragoons, but it would take many decades before those reforms bore fruit.

=== Formations and their evolution ===
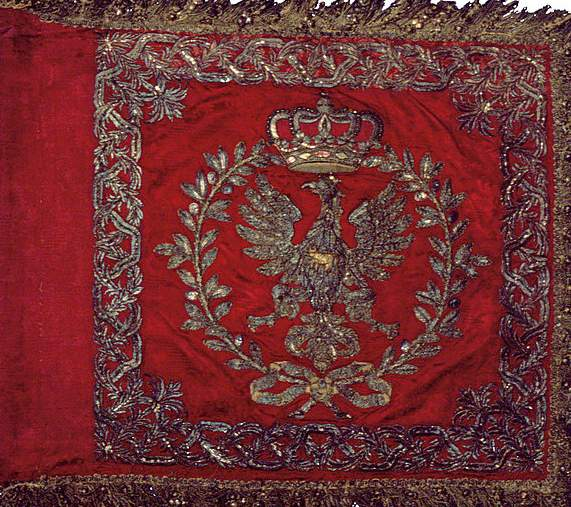
Reverse of the squadron's flag.

After the Commonwealth's creation, several new military units were introduced. First among these were the registered Cossacks, formed in 1578. These were the troops made up of Cossacks, paid for their service and not subject to serfdom. Their numbers varied from about 500 to many times that number, with the Treaty of Zboriv setting the record at 40,477. The Cossacks' refusal to submit to serfdom, and the Commonwealth's nobility's attempts to force them into it, led to much political wrangling concerning the Cossack register's size, which caused numerous Cossack uprisings, particularly in the 17th century. These weakened the state, and eventually led to the Cossack subjugation and destruction by the Russian Empire. In addition to the Cossack formations, another group that provided notable service to the state were the Lipka Tatars, who resided in Lithuania provided some light and medium cavalry units for the Lithuanian army.

During Stephen Báthory's reign in the late 16th century (1576–1586), a peasant-based levy formation, piechota wybraniecka (lit. drafted or selected infantry, also known as piechota łanowa, lit. acreage infantry) was formed. It was based on peasants from solely royal estates, who received a unit of land (łan) in exchange for their service. The formation numbered about 2,300 and after early disappointments was never seen as of much military value. It supplemented the Hajduk infantry, which saw service primarily around late 16th and 17th centuries. In 1655 a new infantry unit was created, the żołnierz dymowy (or żołnierz łanowy – lit. chimney or łan soldier, named again after the type of tax applied). It required all lands, no matter whether owned by king, nobles or the Church, to provide peasant recruits, and applied a similar requirement to towns.

Starting in 1613, the growing inefficiencies of the central government, as well as an increase in foreign threats, led to the creation of a local territorial defense force, known as żołnierz powiatowy (district's soldiers raised by the powiat regions). The artillery formations, at first staffed by foreigners, were reformed in the 1630s, with a new tax levied to support them. This time also marked the introduction of the General of the Artillery rank into the Commonwealth armies. In the mid-17th century, the numbers of wojsko zaciężne and kwarciane proved insufficient, which led to the creation of wojsko komputowe (named after komput, a document passed by the Sejm). Wojsko komputowe numbered (in 1649) 26,000. Simultaneously, wojsko kwarciane was disbanded, and kwarta directed towards the newly created artillery forces. Brzezinski notes that wojsko kwarciane was dissolved in the aftermath of its defeat at the Battle of Batih in 1652. In 1659, in the aftermath of numerous wars, the reformed army numbered around 54,000-60,000; it would decline from that point onward, as the country, impoverished by those wars, would not be able to support such a number.

Another element of the Commonwealth's defence were the various private armies of the most powerful magnates. In peacetime, these consisted of typically small regiments with a few hundred men, but could number up to 10,000, including cavalry and artillery. In some instances the magnate contribution could surpass that of the main Commonwealth army on the frontlines, although the magnates often preferred to spare their troops, as they were not compensated by the state for their contributions. The troops were paid for and equipped by the richest noble families, such as the Opaliński, Lubomirski, Potocki, Ossoliński, Zamoyski, Koniecpolski, Sieniawski, Żółkiewski, Sapieha, Chodkiewicz, Pac and Radziwiłł families. This was one of the reasons why the magnates played a major role in the Commonwealth's politics, and on occasion, engaged in bloody civil wars, e.g. such as the Lithuanian Civil War (1697–1702), amongst themselves.

Similarly, some cities occasional fielded city guard and militia. The most impressive town guard and accompanying fortifications belonged to the port of Gdańsk (Danzig), which boasted 12 infantry companies of 6,000 men total in 1646. There was also a small royal guard regiment, paid for directly by the king. In peacetime, the royal guard numbered around 1,200, but would often be expanded during war. The royal force included a hussar banner, reiter cavalry and infantry units, based upon the "foreign" model. Finally, there were also some irregular militia or mercenary troops which received no official pay but operated with the government's permission and were allowed to retain their loot; most notable of these were the Lisowczyks of the early 17th century.

Both the state and the magnates supported the construction and renovations of several fortifications (such as the Kamianets-Podilskyi Castle).

Polish Army of the Kościuszko Uprising, 1794
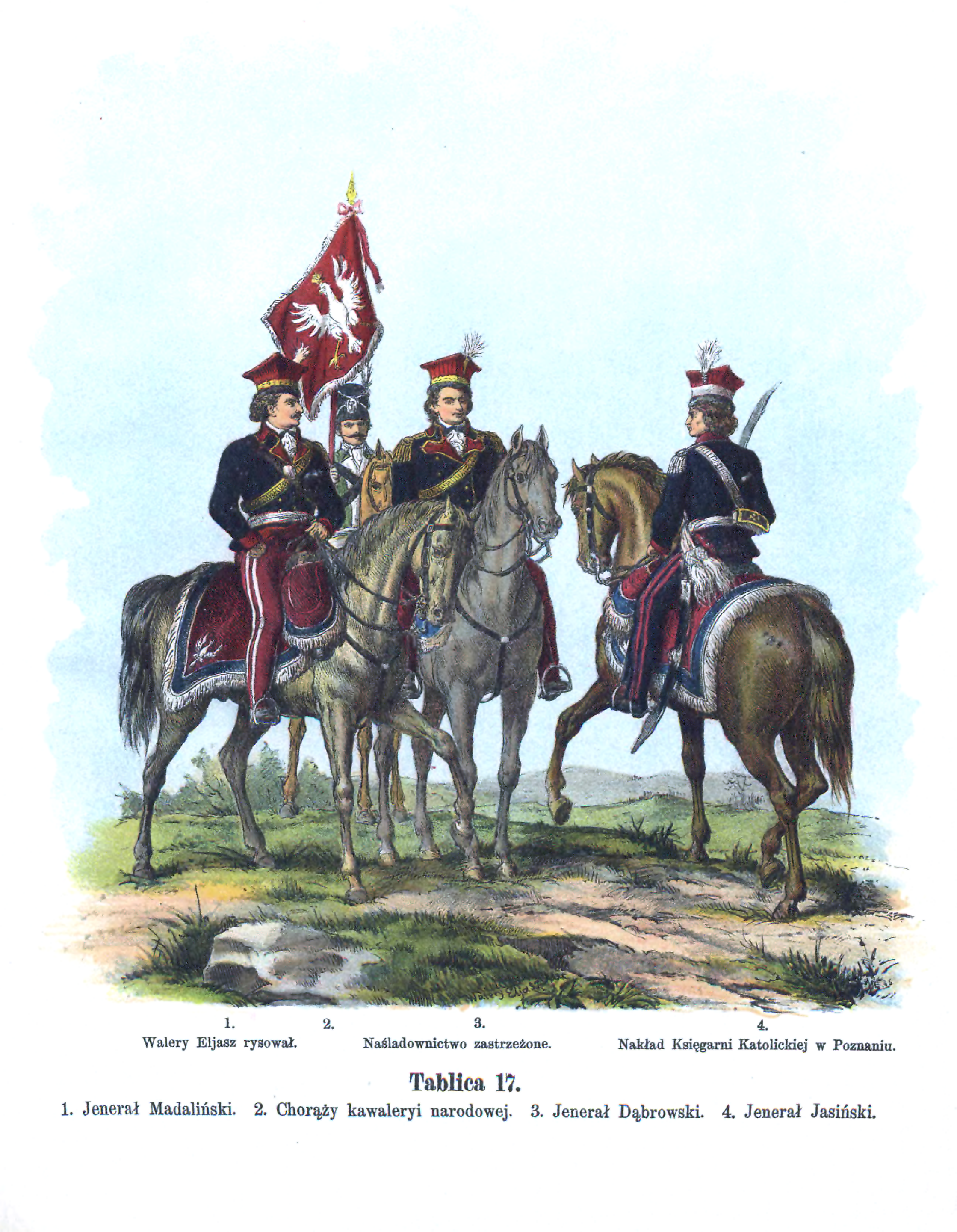
Polish cavalry

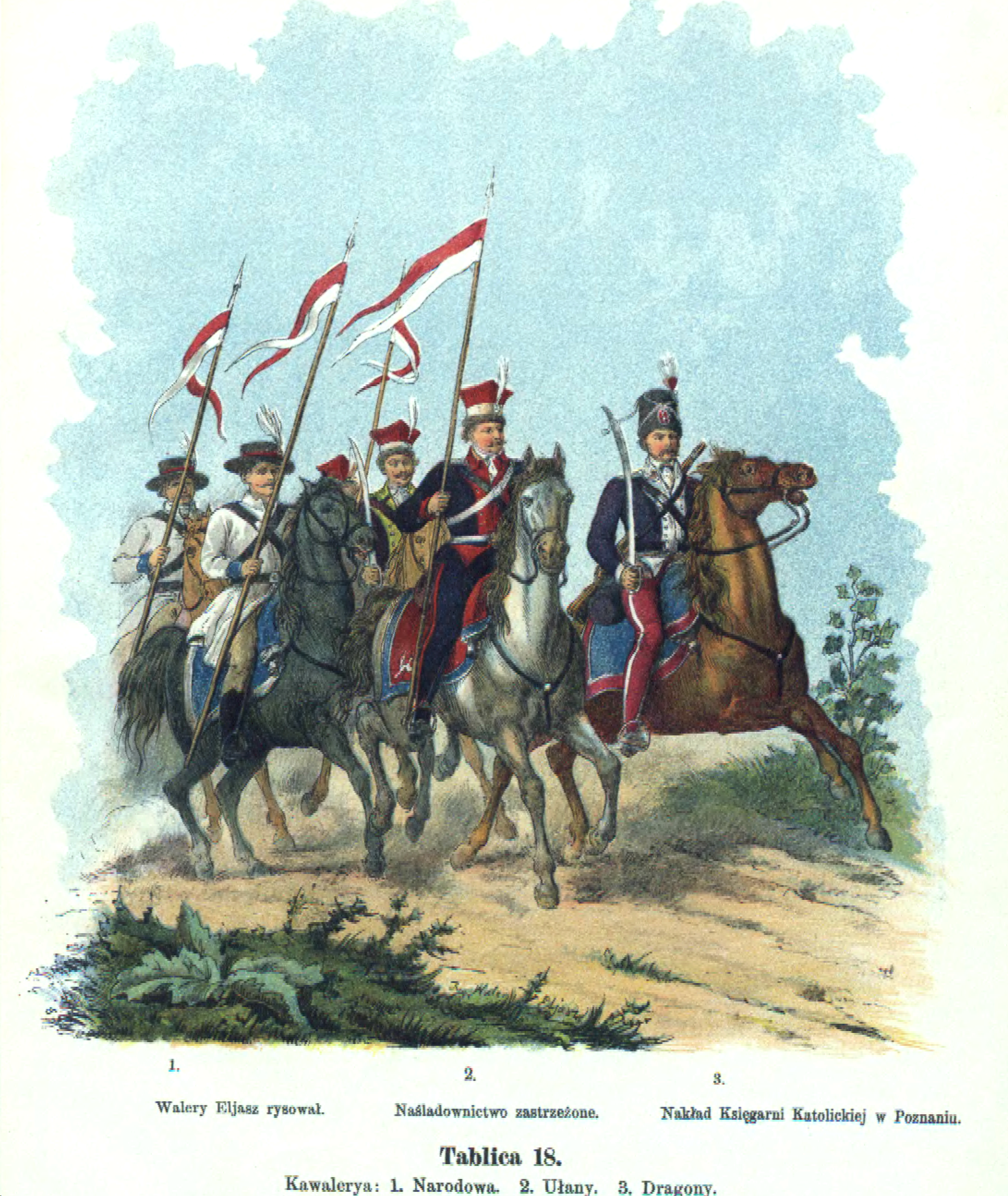
Polish cavalry

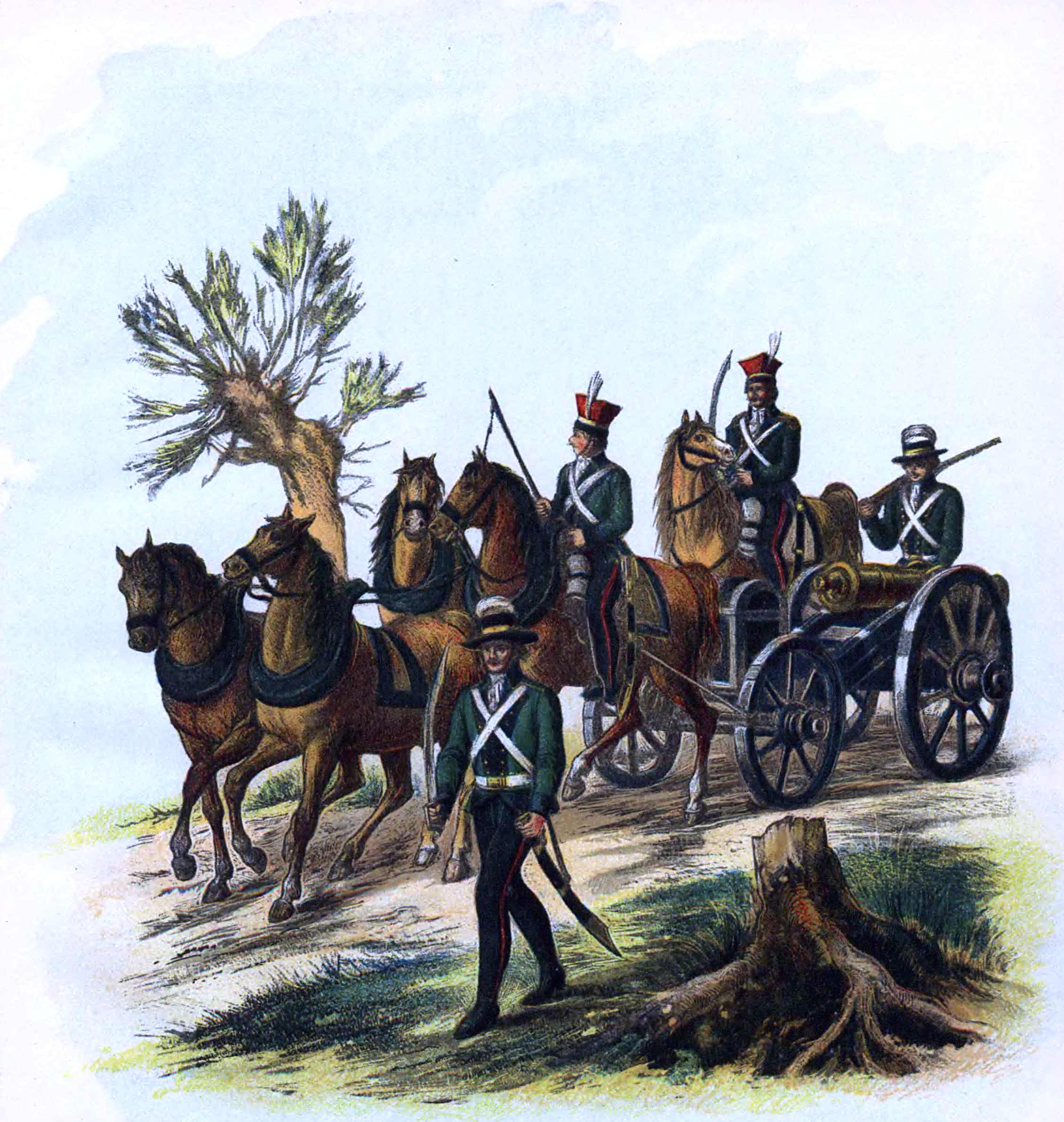
Polish artillery

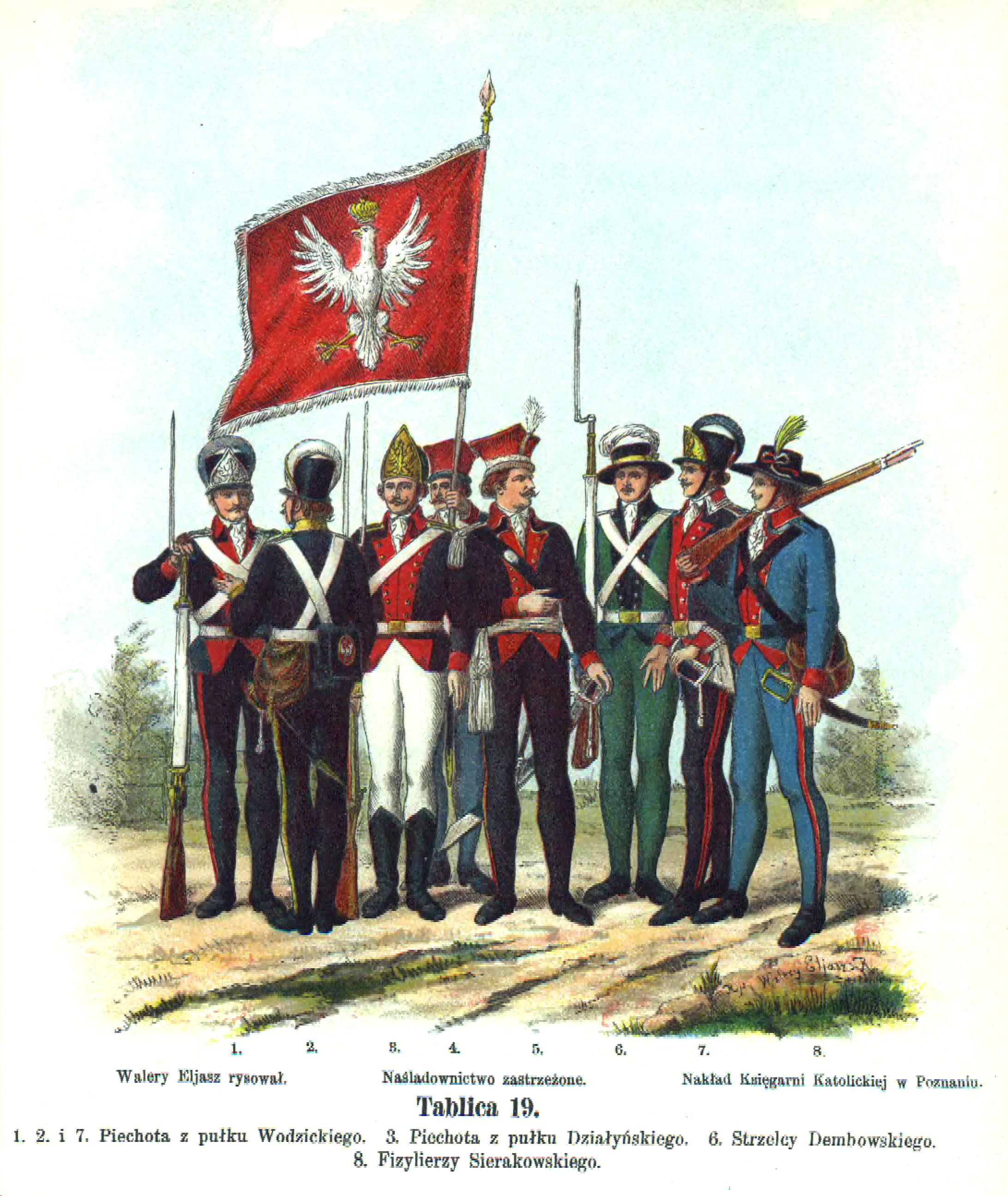
Polish infantry

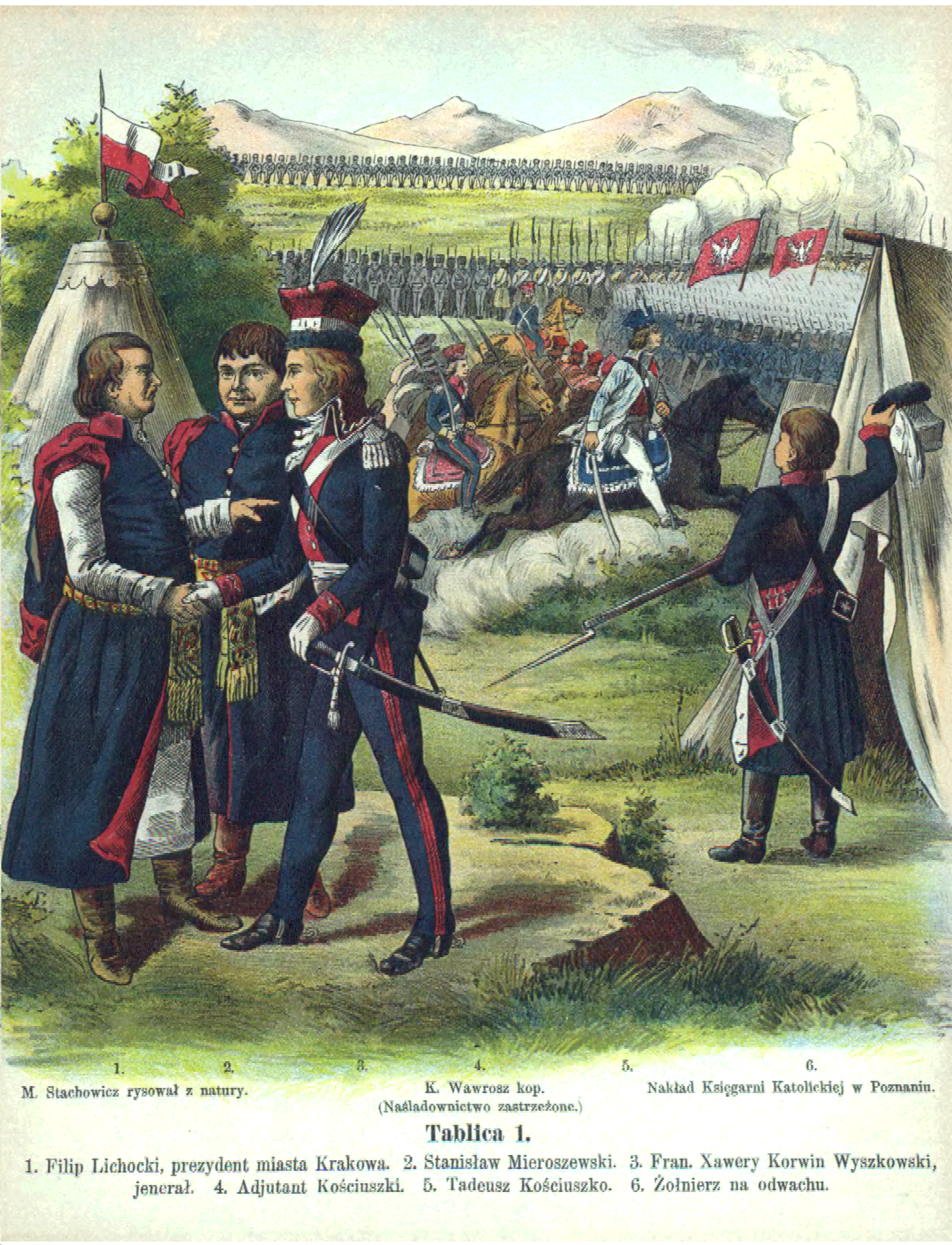
Polish army's officers, camp, with cavalry and infantry in the background

=== Command structure ===
The Commonwealth's military was commanded by the king, under whom served four hetmans: two Grand Hetmans (the Grand Crown Hetman and Grand Lithuanian Hetman) and two Field Hetmans (the Field Crown Hetman and Field Lithuanian Hetman). The hetmans' office appeared in the late 15th century as a result of the wojsko zaciężne's introduction, and a need for more professional army commanders than the king could usually provide. By the 1530s, the hetman system evolved into that of regular offices that would exist in parallel both in Poland and Lithuania for the next three centuries. From 1581, it officially became a lifelong appointment. Hetmans had the right to carry out summary justice in the field. Grand Crown Hetman had the right to maintain his representatives in the Ottoman Empire, which allowed him to influence Poland–Ottoman relations and also laid the groundwork for the first Polish intelligence services. The Hetman's deputy was known as regimentarz and could temporarily replace the hetman.

== Navy ==
The Polish–Lithuanian Commonwealth Navy was small and played a relatively minor role in the history of the Commonwealth. Despite having access to the Baltic Sea, neither Poland nor Lithuania maintained a significant navy. In the 16th century, as Poland and Lithuania became involved in conflicts in Livonia, Sigismund II Augustus supported the creation of privateers to attack enemy forces, but this met with opposition from mercantile interests in Poland's primary port of Gdańsk, which saw them as a threat to their trade routers. This led to the development of a privateer port in Puck. By the 17th century, Poland-Lithuania was ruled by the House of Vasa, and was involved in a series of wars with Sweden. The Vasa kings attempted creating a proper fleet in 1627, and Władysław IV Vasa built a dedicated port for the navy at Władysławowo. However, his attempts repeatedly failed due to lack of funds in the royal treasury; furthermore, seeing little need for a navy the szlachta refused to raise taxes for its creation and Gdańsk continuously opposed the idea of a navy as well. Although Władysław bought 12 ships, they were sold between 1641 and 1643, marking the end of the Commonwealth Navy.

== Logistics and tactics ==
Due to a lack of centralized logistical system, the Commonwealth's armies were encumbered by large baggage trains. To some degree, this was turned into an advantage with the development of the tabor – military horse-drawn wagons, usually carrying army supplies. The wagon use for defensive formations was perfected by the Cossacks, and to a smaller extent used by other Commonwealth units. The Commonwealth armies relied on cavalry, which the nobility saw as much more respectable than the infantry. Despite the reforms of the 17th century, it lost much of its military significance in the 18th century; the primary reason for this was a lack of sufficient funding.

== Problems and reforms ==
With the growing influence of foreign powers in the Commonwealth, the Russian-dominated Silent Sejm of 1717 declared that the size of the Commonwealth's military should be 24,200 (18,000 from Poland and 6,200 for Lithuania). Due to insufficient taxation, the military was often not paid properly, which led to a relatively small army size; in mid-18th century, the Commonwealth had funds to field an army of around 24,000, whereas the Commonwealth's neighbors' armies were often up to 12 times larger: the Imperial Russian Army numbered 300,000; the Prussian Army and Imperial Austrian Army, 150,000, and a few decades later, the Commonwealth could field an army of about 16,000, with Prussian and Austrian armies rising to 200,000. The stated size of the Commonwealth army was further exaggerated, as some money was lost due to corruption. The first half of the 18th century, following the 1717 Sejm, marks the nadir of the Commonwealth army, as it lacked funds and training, and was primarily used for ceremonial purposes. The only constructive reform of that time was the introduction of a stable (if grossly insufficient) budget for the military. Furthermore, the unpaid units of the army were known for mutinying and forming confederations, occupying the Commonwealth's own lands until such a time that they were paid properly or pillaged enough to satisfy themselves.

The trend reversed itself following the election of the last king of Poland, Stanisław II Augustus, in 1765 and the introduction of the new governing body, Permanent Council, in 1775. Its Military Department attempted to modernize the army, and increase its size (although even the target number of 30,000 was never achieved). A major military reform came with the passing of the Constitution of 3 May 1791, which stated that the armies should have 100,000 men. (The exact number would be settled on only on 22 May 1792, at 25,654 cavalry and 72,910 infantry). A new conscription law was introduced, affecting all lands (royal, noble and Church-owned). With the days of the Commonwealth numbered, the Constitution was never fully implemented in practice, although the new Military Commission saw the Army expanded to 65,000 before the Polish defeat in the War in Defense of the Constitution. After the Commonwealth was defeated in that war and the Constitution rescinded, the military total was reduced to about 36,000. In 1794, Russians demanded a further downsizing of the army to 15,000. This demand was one of the sparks of the Commonwealth's final war, the Kościuszko Uprising.

== See also ==
- History of the Polish Army
- Royal Guards (Polish–Lithuanian Commonwealth)
- Scythemen
- National Cavalry
- Szabla
- Warfare in Medieval Poland
