= 1st Lithuanian National Cavalry Brigade =

Military unit

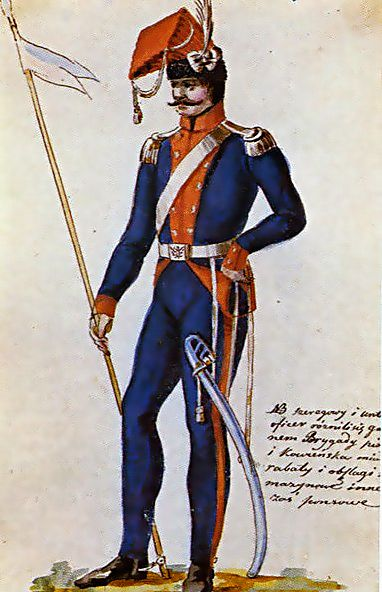
- Uniform of a hussar (1792)
- Active: 1776–1794
- Engagements: War of 1792; Uprising of 1794

Insignia
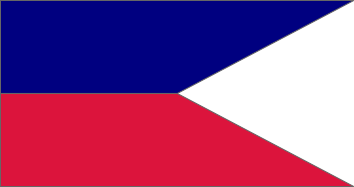
- Lance pennant

1st Lithuanian National Cavalry Brigade (Lithuanian: 1-oji Tautinės kavalerijos husarų brigada) was a National Cavalry Brigade of the Grand Ducal Lithuanian Army. The brigade was also known as the Hussar brigade (stemming from the famous Polish–Lithuanian winged hussars) and the Kaunas brigade (due to where it was garrisoned for sometime).

The brigade was formed in 1776 and it fought in the War of 1792 and the Uprising of 1794.

== Peacetime service ==
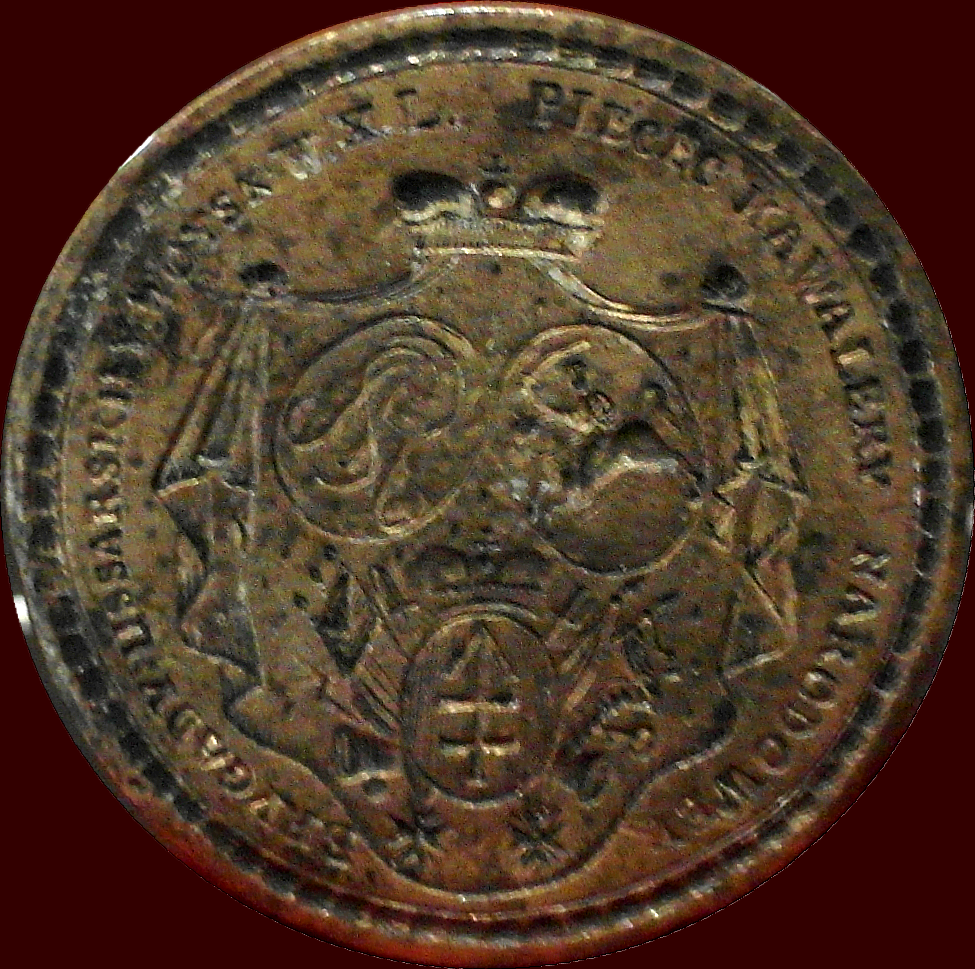
The Great Seal of the 1st Lithuanian National Cavalry Brigade

=== Establishment ===
Formed in 1776, it had a strength of 478 soldiers on paper. According to the "marching installment" of 1777, the actual strength was 294 soldiers. The review carried out in 1776 was described as follows:

The brigade is divided into four squadrons; there are no new regulations, and the reports list 16 banners in the "Number of Personnel" column, in accordance with the Constitution of 1717. However, the companies are not complete as they should be, and therefore a large number of missing men are reported in the line, for even the commanders do not know whether they are in service or have deserted. For they are not in the habit of reporting at all. The retinue soldiers are fit and well-uniformed, yet new sabres, flintlock pistols, cartridge pouches, and Mituk boots are needed. The weapons are now of poor quality and ill-suited, but money has already been allocated for new ones. Pay is received punctually by those always serving at Headquarters, as well as by those on leave under the Hetman's orders; however, this applies only to those who are on the roll and have been duly enrolled as serving personnel. In five Banners, lieutenants and ensigns receive higher pay, whilst in the others they receive less; yet as they perform the same service, they demand a comparison of pay. Under the command of His Excellency Puzyna, Filipów's elder, without any explanation, the horses of the Companions were taken from under their saddles and, after being valued by appointed assessors, were sold; and now the same horses are again being deducted from the officers' and Companions' pay, which everyone considers an injustice. There are 4 lieutenants in this brigade, appointed by the Hetman; one of them is demanding his discharge, he does not perform his duties, and has not received his pay, yet in his place a companion is fulfilling his duties at his own expense. Accommodation in Minsk is unsuitable for the cavalry. The exorbitant costs cannot be borne, and the cavalry are suffering as a result. Their most urgent request is to return to their former quarters in the Prienai eldership.

=== Organisation ===
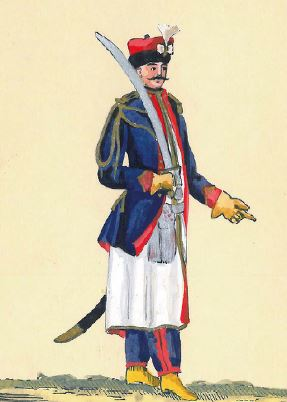
Commanding officer

In 1777 the brigade consisted of a staff and banners. The 16 banners were grouped in 4 squadrons of 4 banners each.

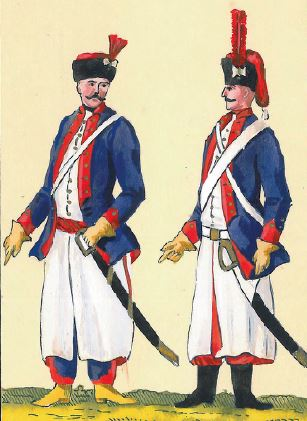
Companion (right) and private (left)

Structure in 1777
Sq.	№	Banner
1	1	His Royal Majesty's
1	2	Michał Hieronim Radziwiłł
1	3	Dominik Przeździecki
1	4	Franciszek Ksawery Sapieha
2	5	Michał Kazimierz Ogiński
2	6	Józef Niesiołowski
2	7	D. Aleksandrowicz
2	8	Konstanty Ludwik Plater
3	9	Józef Sylwester Sosnowski
3	10	Józef Mikołaj Radziwiłł
3	11	Józef Zabiełło
3	12	F. De Raesa
4	13	Karol Stanisław Radziwiłł
4	14	Stanisław Radziwiłł
4	15	Albrycht Radziwiłł
4	16	Michał Jan Borch

== 1790s ==
The reforms of the Four-Year Sejm envisaged an increase in troop strength to 100,000 in 1789. Shortly thereafter, the goal was reduced to 65,000.

While maintaining the 1776 establishment, the new recruitment for the unit provided for 1,120 men, which together was to amount to 1,598 soldiers on active service. In October 1789, the number of companions and privates in a banner was increased. They were to consist of a titular captain, 2 officers, one governor (namiestnik), 46 (in 4 banners) or 47 companions, one non-commissioned officer, one trumpeter (in 8 banners), and 47 retinue men. In total, the brigade thus organized was to have 1,606 men and 1,423 horses.

=== 1792: War with Russia ===
During the War of 1792, the brigade fought at Sverzhany (June 10) and Mir (June 11). Until the Lithuanian army's takeover by the Targowica Confederation later in 1792, the unit had a strength of 1,619 soldiers on paper and 1,349 in reality.

=== 1794: Uprising against Russia ===
Its strength as of August 1, 1793, was 1,017 men and 577 horses, and on April 16, 1794, about 1,000 men and about 800 horses.

It can be assumed that in April 1794 the brigade's strength was 1,262 soldiers on paper and 1,022 in practice. In 1794, it was organized into 12 banners. The brigade was organized into 6 squadrons of two banners each.

During the Kościuszko Uprising of 1794, the brigade fought at Joniškėlis, Shchuchyn (May 13), Panevėžys (May 20), Skuodas (before July 12), Brest (July 23).

== Commanders ==
- Lt. General Antoni Kazimierz Tyszkiewicz (1775–1778)
- Antoni Oskierko (April–December 1778)
- Maj. General Tadeusz Puzyna (3 December 1778–1788),
- Szymon Zabiełło (26 June 1788–1790),
- Piotr Twardowski (12–14 October 1790)
- Jan Ogiński (1790–1791)
- Mikołaj Sulistrowski (January 1791–),
- Frankowski (from 1792).

== Garrison ==
- Kaunas
- Minsk (1789)
- Kėdainiai (1790)
- Ukmergė
- Panevėžys
- Raseiniai
- Šiauliai

== Ranks in the brigade ==
Officer positions in the brigade included: brigadier-commandant, vice-brigadier-commandant, major, quartermaster-cashier, auditor, adjutant, captain, lieutenant, second lieutenant, and ensign. Officer ranks also included the ranks of companion and governor (namiestnik). These ranks were equivalent to the rank of ensign. These were not patented by the king but by captains or hetmans, and their actual roles in the regiments are more comparable to those of non-commissioned officers.

== Bibliography ==
- Gembarzewski, Bronisław (1925). Rodowody pułków polskich i oddziałów równorzędnych od r. 1717 do r. 1831 (in Polish). Warsaw: Towarzystwo Wiedzy Wojskowej.
- Czop, Jan (2017). Barwa Wojska Rzeczypospolitej Obojga Narodów w XVIII wieku oraz Legionów Polskich 1797-1807 (in Polish). Rzeszow: Wydawnictwo LIBRA PL. ISBN 978-83-635-2698-6.
- Machynia, Mariusz; Rakutis, Valdas; Srzednicki, Czesław (1999). Oficerowie wojska Wielkiego Księstwa Litewskiego. Sztab, kawaleria, artyleria, wojska inżynieryjne i piechota (in Polish). Kraków: Księgarnia Akademicka. Wydawnictwo Naukowe. ISBN 8371882394.
- Ratajczyk, Leonard; Teodorczyk, Jerzy (1987). Wojsko powstania kościuszkowskiego w oczach współczesnych malarzy (in Polish). Warszawa: Wydawnictwo Ministerstwa Obrony Narodowej. ISBN 8311070903.

=== Do szarży marsz, marsz... Studia z dziejów kawalerii ===
- Ciesielski, Tomasz (2010). "Jazda koronna i Wielkiego Księstwa Litewskiego autoramentu narodowego armii Rzeczypospolitej Obojga Narodów w latach 1717–1776" [The cavalry of the Crown and the Grand Duchy of Lithuania of the national contingent of the Polish–Lithuanian Commonwealth's military in the years 1717–1776]. In Smoliński, Aleksander (ed.). Do szarży marsz, marsz... Studia z dziejów kawalerii (in Polish). Vol. 1. Toruń: Wydawnictwo Naukowe Uniwersytetu Mikołaja Kopernika. ISBN 978-83-231-2567-9.
- Machynia, Mariusz (2012). "Kawaleria litewska w początkowym okresie działań Komisji Wojskowej Rzeczypospolitej Wielkiego księstwa Litewskiego. Lata 1765–1766" [The Lithuanian cavalry during the early years of the Commonwealth's Military Commission's activities in the Grand Duchy of Lithuania. 1765–1766]. In Smoliński, Aleksander (ed.). Do szarży marsz, marsz... Studia z dziejów kawalerii (in Polish). Vol. 2. Toruń: Wydawnictwo Naukowe Uniwersytetu Mikołaja Kopernika. ISBN 978-83-231-2783-3.
- Trąbski, Maciej (2012). "Kawaleria autoramentu narodowego Rzeczypospolitej Obojga Narodów w epoce stanisławowskiej. Lata 1775–1794" [The National Cavalry of the Polish–Lithuanian Commonwealth in the Stanisław August Poniatowski Era. 1775–1794]. In Smoliński, Aleksander (ed.). Do szarży marsz, marsz... Studia z dziejów kawalerii (in Polish). Vol. 2. Toruń: Wydawnictwo Naukowe Uniwersytetu Mikołaja Kopernika. ISBN 9788323127833.
