= Petyhorcy =

17th and 18th-century type Lithuanian cavalry

Petyhorcy (singular: Petyhorzec, Latin: pientho-horcensis, Lithuanian: Petihorai) was a type of regular medium-armoured light cavalry exclusively in the Grand Ducal Lithuanian Army during the 17th and 18th centuries. The petyhorcy are viewed as the Lithuanian equivalent of the Polish Armoured Companion, or as a cavalry type that was between the Winged Hussars and the Armoured Companion. They were organised in Banners. Originally, the petyhorcy were spear-armed cavalry from Circassia.

The petyhorcy were supposed to finish off and defeat the enemy line that was breached by the Winged Hussars. While the Winged Hussars were more prestigious, the petyhorcy enjoyed high reputation, hence their banner's rotmistras were frequently high-ranking officials. In fact, the petyhorcy developed in the late 16th-century from the mounted shooters who protected the hussars.

== Etymology ==
The name of the petyhorcy comes from Mount Beshtau (in Turkic languages, besh means five and tau means mountain). The name of the Russian city of Pyatigorsk is also derived from it. Tadeusz Czacki wrote that the petyhorcy originated from the Carpathian Mountains, but that is false.

== 17th century ==
With time the unit type evolved into medium cavalry, almost identical to the Armoured companion. The armour used by those later units included a full chainmail armour with misiurka and arm protectors and often also a kalkan, a round Turkish-style shield. In the 17th century the chainmail was gradually replaced by cuirasses. The offensive armament used by petyhorcy included a 3 to 4-metre-long lance or bear spear (rohatyna), as well as a Szabla, two pistols and a musket carbine or an eastern-type bow.

Similar to the armoured companions, their armour was chain mail, while their equipment consisted of a shield, lance and bow, the latter only when fighting the Ottoman army. In the mid-17th century, this type of cavalry was usually called the Cossack-type cavalry.

In 1614, the army led by Jacob De la Gardie had two petyhorcy banners, whose commanders were Jaromir Plecki and Stanisław Wolski.

In 1673, the Grand Ducal Lithuanian Army had 18 petyhorcy banners, totalling 1,980 horses. In early 1676, there were 22 petyhorcy rota with 2,670 horses, but in the later part of the year, this shrunk to 20 rota of 2,430 horses. In 1690, the Lithuanian Army officially had 620 petyhorcy.

== 18th century ==
In 1717, in the Grand Ducal Lithuanian Army, the petyhorcy were the most numerous cavalry, having a total of 26 banners. During the military reforms of 1775–1776, all Hussar and petyhorcy flags, of which there were 32 in total, were merged into two National Cavalry brigades of 16 flags each. The second one was the 2nd Lithuanian National Cavalry Brigade, also called the 2nd (Pinsk) Petyhorcy Brigade, which had about 380 soldiers. In 1789, it numbered 1635 and was composed of 17–32 banners. This brigade was deployed in the eastern lands of the Grand Duchy of Lithuania, on the Russian border. During wartime, the brigade was redeployed. During the War of 1792, part of the brigade's banners were located in the Russian occupation zone and hence were disbanded. The last time the petyhorcy fought were in the Kościuszko Uprising.

In the 18th century, the petyhorcy were armed with a lance, backsword and pistols or carbine.

== Sources ==
- Korzon, Tadeusz; Gembarzewski, Bronisław (1912). Dzieje wojen i wojskowości w Polsce; Epoka przedrozbiorowa (in Polish). Polska: Akademia umiejętności.
- Kupisz, Dariusz (2012). "The Polish-Lithuanian Military in the reign of King Stefan Bathory (1576–1586)". In Davies, Brian (ed.). Warfare in Eastern Europe, 1500–1800. Brill Publishers. ISBN 978-9004221963.
- Mistrini, Vincenzo (2016). Le guerre polacco-ottomane (1593–1699) (in Italian). Vol. 1: Le forze in campo. Soldiershop Publishing. ISBN 9788893271752.
- Bobiatyński, Konrad; Hundert, Zbigniew (2018). "The Composition of the Army of the Grand Duchy of Lithuania during the War with Turkey (1675–1676) in the Light of Financial and Military files" (PDF). Zapiski Historyczne. 83.
- Rakutis, Valdas (2021). "Petihorai". Vle.lt (in Lithuanian).
