= Adam Ostrzycki =

Polish szlachcic (nobleman)

Adam Ostrzycki also Adam Ustrzycki, Adam Jan Ustrzycki was a Polish szlachcic (nobleman), marshall of the confederation’s army from 1665 to 1666.

Adam Ostrzycki (Ustrzycki) was son of Dymitr Ustrzycki and Katarzyna Kopystyńska. He had four brothers and one sister. His nephews were Hieronim Ustrzycki, bishop of Przemyśl, and Bazyli Ustrzycki, łowczy (Master of the Hunt) of Wschowa. From July 1654 to September 1662 he served as member (towarzysz husarski) of Hussar baner (chorągiew husarska) of Stanisław "Rewera" Potocki, Great Crown Hetman.

According to Seweryn Uruski in 1678 his wife was Zofia Zamiechowska.

He was portrayed by Antoni Edward Odyniec in Jerzy Lubomirski, czyli wojna domowa w Polsce (1861).
