= Husarz =

Husarz may refer to:

- Hussar
- Towarzysz husarski
- Third-generation Siemens EuroSprinter locomotives operated by PKP Intercity, officially classed as EU44
