= National Cavalry =

Branch of Polish-Lithuanian armed forces

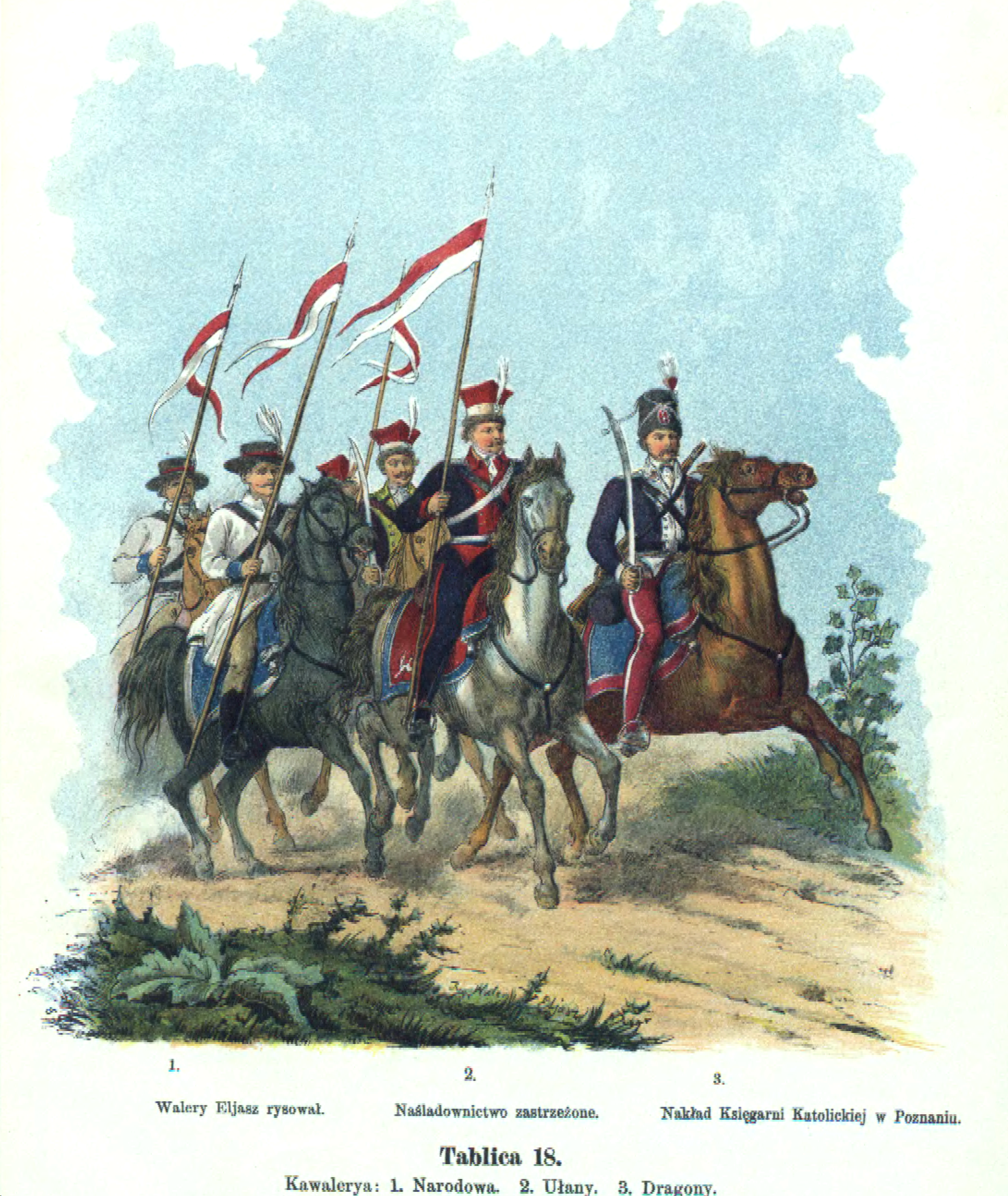
National Cavalry in 1794 (painting by Walery Eljasz Radzikowski)

The National Cavalry (Polish: Kawaleria narodowa; Lithuanian: Tautinė kavalerija) was a branch of cavalry in the Polish–Lithuanian Commonwealth's military (both the Crown and Lithuanian armies) from 1775 to 1794. The national cavalry ceased to exist with the fall of the Commonwealth in 1795.

Formed as a merger of previously-existing units of winged hussars, pancerni and petyhorcy that were still in service after the Bar Confederation. In 1777, the Sejm passed new regulations that converted all units of heavy cavalry and medium cavalry and reformed them into a line cavalry, roughly similar to later uhlans. Existing dragoon and vanguard regiments were outside this reform. The national cavalry had a very short history of less than 20 years, and some units stationed in the eastern Polish–Lithuanian Commonwealth were forcibly incorporated into the Russian cavalry following the Second Partition, and the remainder was disbanded together with the rest of Commonwealth's armed forces after the final partition in 1795.

The Sejm's 1777 decision was a rather late effort to modernize Polish–Lithuanian cavalry, along with the much earlier trend of evolution of European cavalry towards the more modern organization of the cavalry regiments into more mobile formations. The most modern part of the reform was the establishment of some very modern battle dress uniforms for these cavalrymen, and in turn, this uniform of the national cavalry inspired numerous similar uniforms and employment of 'Polish lance' in the rest of Europe, notably the Austrian, Prussian, Russian cavalry, and later of the French cavalry of the Napoleonic Wars.

== 1775–1788 ==
=== Establishment ===
National cavalry was established in 1775 by a decision of the Partition Sejm (1773–1775) which enacted the First Partition. This was the result of a military reform aimed at enhancing the combat value of the cavalry of the national contingent (autorament), which until then consisted of hussar and armoured companion (pancerni) banners (in the case of the Lithuanian army, the petyhorcy). These formations had an anachronistic structure and limited combat value, as evidenced by the Great Northern War (1700–1721) and the Bar Confederation (1768–1772). The idea behind the changes was to implement a modern structure, adequate to both organizational and combat needs. However, the distinction between hussars and armoured companions persisted, disappearing from official military documents only after 1776.

The strength of tradition and the resistance of certain factions meant that the national cavalry continued the ancient and ineffective system of companions and retinue (i.e., privates) that existed in the old army. Therefore, it was impossible to standardize the weaponry, which for companions consisted of two pistols and a sabre, while for retinue consisted of a backsword, two pistols, and a cavalry carbine. Over time, companions received a kopia (lance). An order from the Military Department from 1785 stated: "A companion in the brigades will use a lance for combat and execution, made according to a model, with a shaft five cubits (2.87 cm) long, painted crimson (...)."

==== Organisation ====
Four Nation Cavalry brigades were established in the Crown – one Greater Poland and three Ukrainian, each comprising 24 squadrons and 737 men. As regards the Lithuanian Army, two brigades were established, each comprising 16 squadrons and 478 men.

The regulations stipulated that the number of companions and retinue would be equal, but the custom of the companions providing them meant that there were more retinue. Parallel to the national cavalry brigades, although not part of the national cavalry, former light cavalry banners were transformed into the vanguard regiments: 2 in the Crown and 5 in Lithuania.

In 1784, Sejm increased the number of men in each brigade to 876, divided into 6 squadrons, they in turn divided into 4 banners, each squadron 144 men and horses, while banner roughly 35 men and horses. In 1786, the strength of the Commonwealth's national cavalry stood at 4,460 men.

== 1790s ==
=== Four-Year Sejm ===
On 12 November 1788, the Sejm increased the number of cavalrymen in each brigade and since then the brigades were to be 3,600 men strong. The division onto banners was also abolished and replaced with a division into squadrons. Each brigade was since then composed of 24 squadrons. Following this reform, each national cavalry squadron was composed of 4 cug sub-units (German: zug, meaning platoon). The first cug in every squadron consisted of 32 former "towarzysz" Hussars, while the remaining three were composed of 32 former Pancerni cavalrymen. This allowed the unit to be fairly flexible, with the first cug used for break-through charges and the other three in supporting roles.

During the Four-Year Sejm more brigades were formed in the Crown Army, now totaling 8. Each consisted of 12 squadrons of 150 men and numbered 1,819 soldiers. The Lithuanian Army still had 2 brigades (1st and 2nd), but each with an increased strength of 1,635 men on paper.

=== War of 1792 and aftermath ===
At the outbreak of War of 1792 with Russia, the national cavalry numbered 17,822 men. During this war, the national cavalry fought most notably at the battles of Zieleńce and Dubienka.

After the war, its numbers were significantly reduced; as a result of the Second Partition, the Crown's 4th National Cavalry Brigade and parts of the two Lithuanian brigades were incorporated into the Imperial Russian army. At the outbreak of the Kościuszko Uprising, most of them managed to break through to the Commonwealth and, along with the rest, take part in the Uprising.

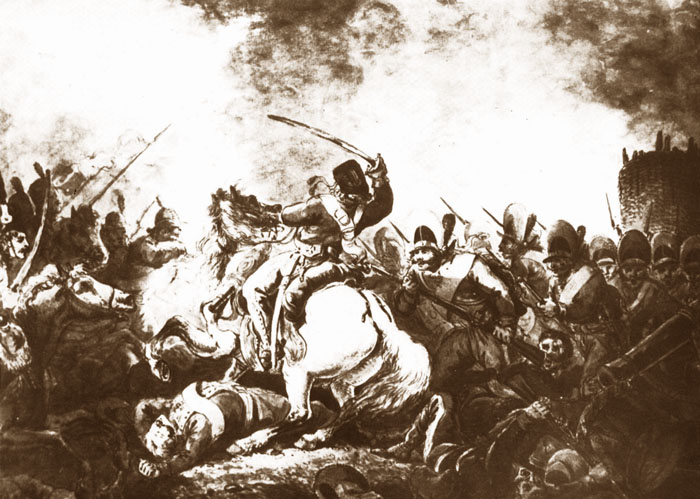
National cavalry and artillerymen defending a rampart against Russian infantry in 1794, a painting by Aleksander Orłowski

=== 1794 ===
Actions of the 1st Greater Poland National Cavalry Brigade, commanded by Antoni Madaliński, on March 12, 1794, served as the trigger for the Kościuszko Uprising.

During the Uprising, significant changes in weaponry occurred, as due to a lack of sufficient firearms, Kościuszko ordered the removal of the cavalry carbines to augment the infantry's weaponry.

Additional national cavalry units were raised in various parts of Poland. The national cavalry fought in many of the Kościuszko Uprising's battles, most notably:

- Battle of Racławice of April 4, 1794
- Battle of Szczekociny of June 6, 1794
- Battle of Krupczyce of September 17, 1794
- Battle of Terespol of September 19, 1794
- Battle of Maciejowice of October 10, 1794

The national cavalry was destroyed together with the state that it defended.

== Uniforms ==
The soldiers of the national cavalry were dressed in the modernized and synchronized Polish national battle dress reflecting the appearance of Hussar and Pancerni dress prescribed by the 1746 proclamation of hetman Michał Kazimierz Radziwiłł. The 1746 Hussar regiments were dressed in crimson caps and kontuszes, with Navy-blue lapels and collars, while the Pancerni wore Navy-blue caps and kontuszes, with crimson lapels and collars. The only difference between the units formed in Lithuania and those from the Crown were the buttons: silver for Polish and golden for Lithuanian units.

In the initial period of its existence, the national cavalry wore uniforms of former hussar and armored banners, and their attire was modeled on the Polish national costume, namely the żupan and kontusz.

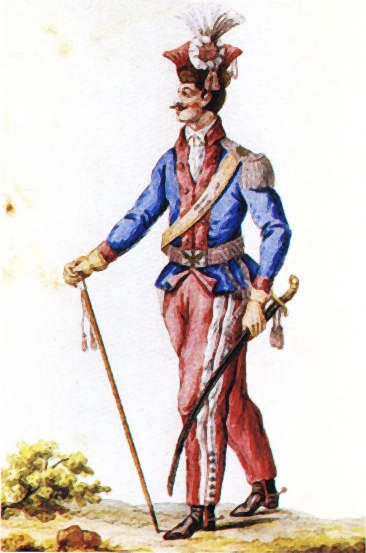
Companion of the 1st Greater Poland National Cavalry Brigade, in the uniform introduced in 1790

=== 1785 uniform ===
In 1785, a uniform reform was carried out. Since then, all national cavalry units used navy blue kurtka with red (later various colors) coloured pannel (pipping) of the Pancerni, red Polish-style loose fit pants (szarawary) with a double-lampas, buttoned with 6 buttons on the outside below the knee, and crimson (square-top) czapka of the Hussars for the companions and red or black Kolpak for the retinue, changed later into a black "giwer" hat, 8 inches tall.

The uniform of an officer and a companion was to consist of a rogatywka with a crimson crown and a black lambskin trim, a navy blue jacket with crimson sleeve cuffs and lapels, a white żupannik, and crimson trousers. Retinue, on the other hand, were to wear tall, tapering black leather caps (kiver) with a peak, lining, a tassel, and a brass plate bearing the royal monogram. Furthermore, white colettes with crimson lapels were to be worn.

=== 1791 uniform ===
On 11 March 1791, the new regulation was passed by the Commonwealth's Military Commission. It introduced, among other things, navy blue trousers in place of the comrades' crimson ones, and instead of a cockade, a knight's cross on the rogatywka, which was significantly reduced in size.

Essentially the uniforms remained unchanged, but the number of adornments was lessened in order to make the uniforms less expensive. However, the new uniforms were never fully introduced. For rain and cold weather, they had cavalry coats of white color buttoned with 12 buttons in the front, and heavier cloth pants, while during the summer the retinue wore loose linen summer pants. They wore black boots were of Polish design, with a one-inch heel and spurs attached.

== Equipment ==
The main offensive weapons for the national cavalry regiments were: 'kopija' (lances) (companion) with swallow-tail pennon below the point, and cavalry carbines (retainers) and various Polish sabres for all.

Horses were of Polish breeding (mostly from the country's Podolian and Volhynian studs) of medium stature, crested and with a high neck, strong footed with 'iron hooves,' fast and with much stamina. Trumpeters traditionally rode paint horses for show and contrast. Horse harness was very well defined in the 1791 regulations: bridle with snaffle bit and curb-bit and double reins, breastplate with small 'rose' in the center, horse saddled with a Polish wooden-treed, leather-covered saddle (similar to the Hungarian hussar one) with high pommel and cantle, and croupier attached, with two leather pistol holsters attached to the saddle. Saddle was covered with a dyed textile 'mitug' (short shabraque) for a companion and black-dyed sheepskin 'mitug' with cloth double-color edge for a retainer, a 32-inch cloth valise behind the saddle under the mitug, with a grain bag underneath this valise. In addition two linen bags attached to the saddle and a small ax for a retainer.

== Evaluation ==
According to Michał Mackiewicz:

The national cavalry has not written a glorious page in the tradition of Polish arms. Both the 1792 war and the fighting in 1794 demonstrated its limited combat value, stemming from poor weaponry, poor discipline, and low morale. In several key engagements, brigades abandoned the battlefield in panic, including at Dubienka in 1792, and at Racławice and Maciejowice during the Uprising.

== Bibliography ==
- (in Polish) Bronisław Gembarzewski: "Rodowody pułków polskich i oddziałów równorzędnych", Biblioteka Muzeum Wojska, Warszawa 1925
- (in Polish) Szymon Kobyliński: "Gawędy o broni i mundurze", Warszawa 1984
- (in Polish) Brygada I Kawalerii Narodowej "Rekonstrukcja munduru towarzysza Kawalerii Narodowej Koronnej z lat 1791–1794" Piotr M. Zalewski, Militaria i fakty.
- Mackiewicz, Michał (2024). "Kawaleria Narodowa". Muzeum WP (in Polish). Archived from the original on 14 June 2024.
