= Colonel Königsfels Teaching Prince Poniatowski to Ride =

Painting by Bernardo Bellotto (National Museum in Warsaw)

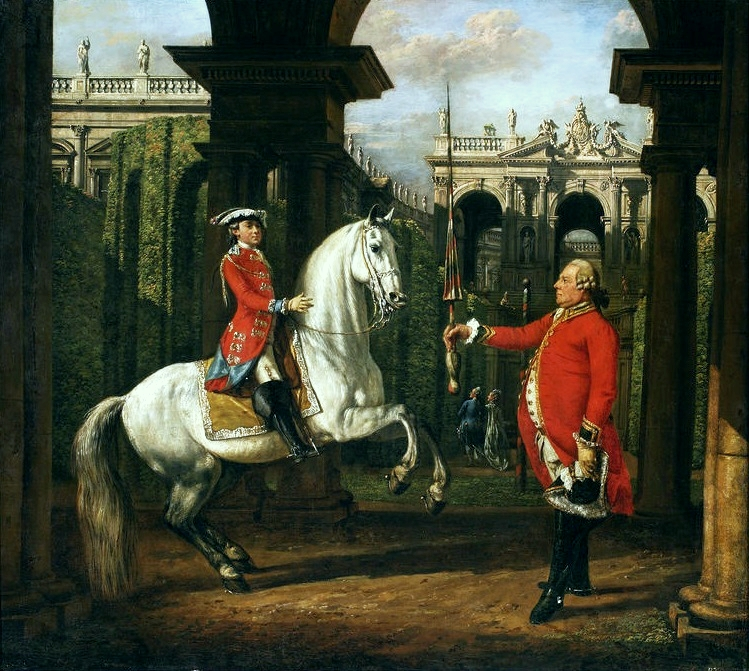
- Artist: Bernardo Bellotto
- Year: 1773
- Medium: oil on canvas
- Dimensions: 73 cm × 81.5 cm (29 in × 32.1 in)
- Location: National Museum; Warsaw

Colonel Königsfels Teaching Prince Poniatowski to Ride is an oil on canvas painting by Italian artist Bernardo Bellotto, from 1773. It is held in the collection of the National Museum, in Warsaw.

== Description ==
It depicts Prince Józef Poniatowski, aged around 10 years old, wearing the uniform of the Crown Army's Royal Guards and astride a grey Lipizzan horse, executing a pesade. To the right of Poniatowski is Colonel Piotr Königsfels, holding a staff and displaying the sign for a pesade. In the background, there is an arch bearing the Poniatowski and Ciołek coat of arms.
