= Royal Guards (Polish–Lithuanian Commonwealth) =

Military Guard unit in service of Poland-Lithuania

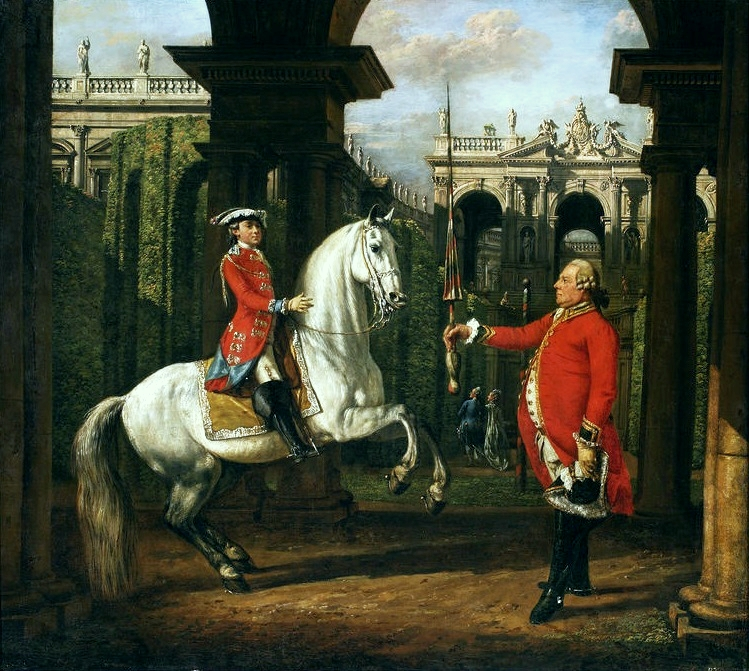
A 1773 painting depicting Józef Poniatowski (left) wearing the uniform of the Crown Army's Royal Guards

The Royal Guards, also known as the Royal Foot Guards (Polish: Gwardia Piesza Koronna), were the royal guard units of the military of the Polish–Lithuanian Commonwealth, which existed from 1569 to 1795. Charged with the protection of Poland-Lithuania's royal family, they formed either part of the Polish Crown Army or the Grand Ducal Lithuanian Army, and fought in numerous conflicts Poland-Lithuania participated in during the early modern period. All Royal Guards units ceased to exist after Poland-Lithuania was dissolved in 1795 as a result of the Third Partition of Poland.

== Background ==
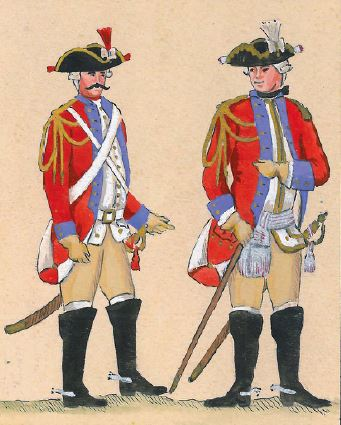
A soldier and officer of the Grand Ducal Lithuanian Army's 63rd Life Dragoons Regiment, which formed part of the army's Royal Guards (1775)

The earliest mentioned document or decree referring to the Royal Guards of Poland dates back to the reign of King John II Casimir. In 1650, the newly established regiment under the command of foreign mercenaries and military commanders was entirely incorporated into the regular, main forces of the Crown over which the monarch or ruler was personally responsible and accountable for. The guards served at the royal courts of Michał Korybut Wiśniowiecki (reigned as Michael I), John III Sobieski, Augustus II the Strong, Augustus III and the last king of Poland Stanisław II Augustus. The first commander-in-chief of the modern regiment was Field Marshal Jakub Henryk Fleming, who held this post between 1717 and 1732.

Guard was in service directly to the King and was paid out of the Treasury of the Polish–Lithuanian Commonwealth. Following a reform and the re-organization carried out in 1710, other small units directly serving for the monarch were either incorporated into the Royal Foot Guard regiment or broken down into reserves. This act was a punishment for siding with King Stanisław I Leszczyński during a war with Augustus II the Strong.

== Reorganization in 1717 ==
After the reorganization carried out in 1717, the Royal Foot Guards were regarded and considered as one of the most exceptionally trained, strongest and largest military formations of the Crown and the Polish–Lithuanian Commonwealth. Since 1756 both the elite land troops and the mounted units served as the Royal Guard and performed a compulsory guard drill in front of Wilanów Palace, the Saxon Palace and the Warsaw Royal Castle for the monarch's pleasure and perhaps for public spectacle or entertainment. Since the soldiers were responsible for protecting the palace or the royal residence, therefore they were also responsible for the protection of the reigning monarch and the royal family.

== Later period ==
On October 3, 1789, after the nomination of the 26-year-old Prince Józef Poniatowski to the rank of Major-General of the forces, he briefly took command of the Royal Foot Guards. Most likely, Poniatowski held the position until the spring of 1790, when he was sent as an envoy to Podolia. On the orders of King Stanisław II Augustus, on June 16, 1792, the Royal Guard soldiers and officers were dismissed or transferred to the newly created 15 Regiment. Such actions were possibly influenced by the tense economic and financial situation of the Commonwealth.

Following this decision, the remaining soldiers were mobilized into two newly established units; a Battalion of Grenadiers and Battalion of Fusiliers. The Royal Guards consisted of the most exceptionally trained soldiers and most exceptional officers of the Polish Army in the late eighteenth century.

The Royal Guards actively participated in the Kościuszko Uprising and were responsible for the defence of Warsaw.

== Dress and uniform ==
Royal Guard's uniform consisted of a red cloth jacket with white lapels and a blue or turquoise vest. An infantry soldier of the Royal Guards Regiment was armed with a flintlock musket with an attached bayonet, possibly originating from a Prussian musket model dating from 1722 and then upgraded by the Saxons and manufactured in the town of Suhl. An officer was required to always wear a broadsword at his side. Deputy officers had a shorter version of the musket, but also were responsible for having a ceremonial saber and a pistol. Each soldier was equipped with a backpack and pouches in addition to a leather belt slung over his shoulder with a wooden insert and prepared sites in the form of holes or pockets for loads. During the colder seasons, the soldiers also received red coats, similar to those worn by the British Army.
