= Armoured companion =

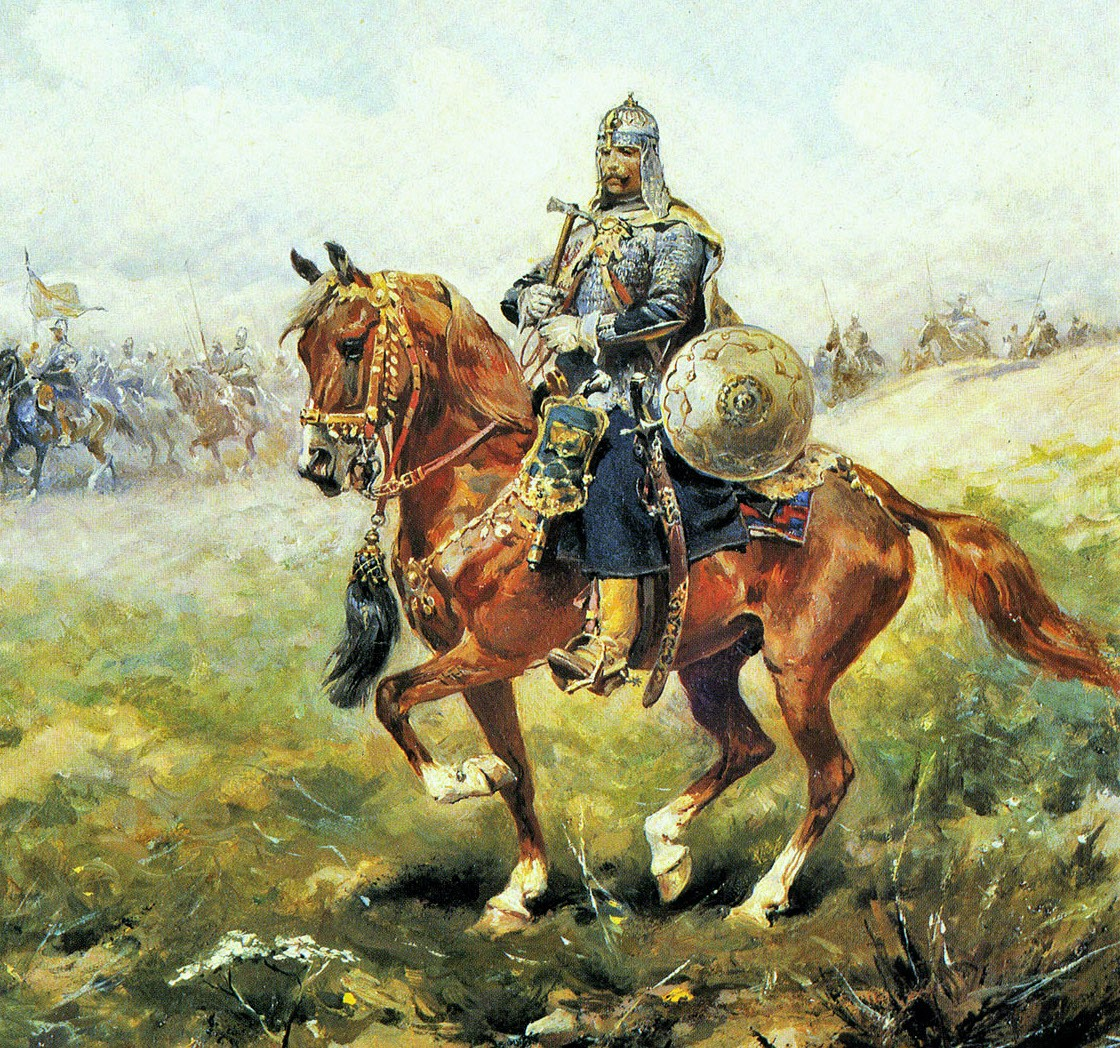
- Allegiance: Polish–Lithuanian Commonwealth
- Type: Cavalry
- Role: Standing professional military
- Equipment: War hammer, mace, hatchet, sabre, spear, lance

The armoured companion (Polish: Towarzysz pancerny, Polish: [tɔˈvaʐɨʂ panˈtsɛrnɨ], pl. towarzysze pancerni) was a medium-cavalryman used by the Polish–Lithuanian Commonwealth in the 16th to 18th centuries. They are named after their chain mail armour. These units were the second-most important cavalry in the Polish–Lithuanian army, after the hussars.

Most pancerni were recruited from the middle to lowest classes of the Polish nobility.

These companions were organized into companies, with each company (Polish: chorągiew, or rota) consisting of 60 to 200 horsemen.

The Cossack cavalry was renamed armoured cavalry (jazdę pancerną) in 1676 as the Cossack name was associated with the Khmelnytsky Uprising. After the reforms in 1776, both hussars and armored companions were transformed into National Cavalry units.

== Arms and armour ==
They used chainmail or bechter armour to protect the upper body, vambrace sometimes with gauntlets, secretes (rarely lobster-tailed pot helmets), buckler shields, sabre, composite bow, pistols, and carbine. Earlier companies would sometimes be equipped with a horseman's pick, mace, or lance. During the rule of king John III Sobieski, lances became compulsory.

During the Middle Ages, under the rule of Mieszko I and Bolesław I the Brave, the name pancerni applied to the members of the duke's retinue. They were the wealthiest warriors in the Polish army, and as such, they could afford to wear sophisticated armour, most commonly chainmail. Their weapons included arming swords, axes, spears, shields, and strait bows.

Examples of Pancerny
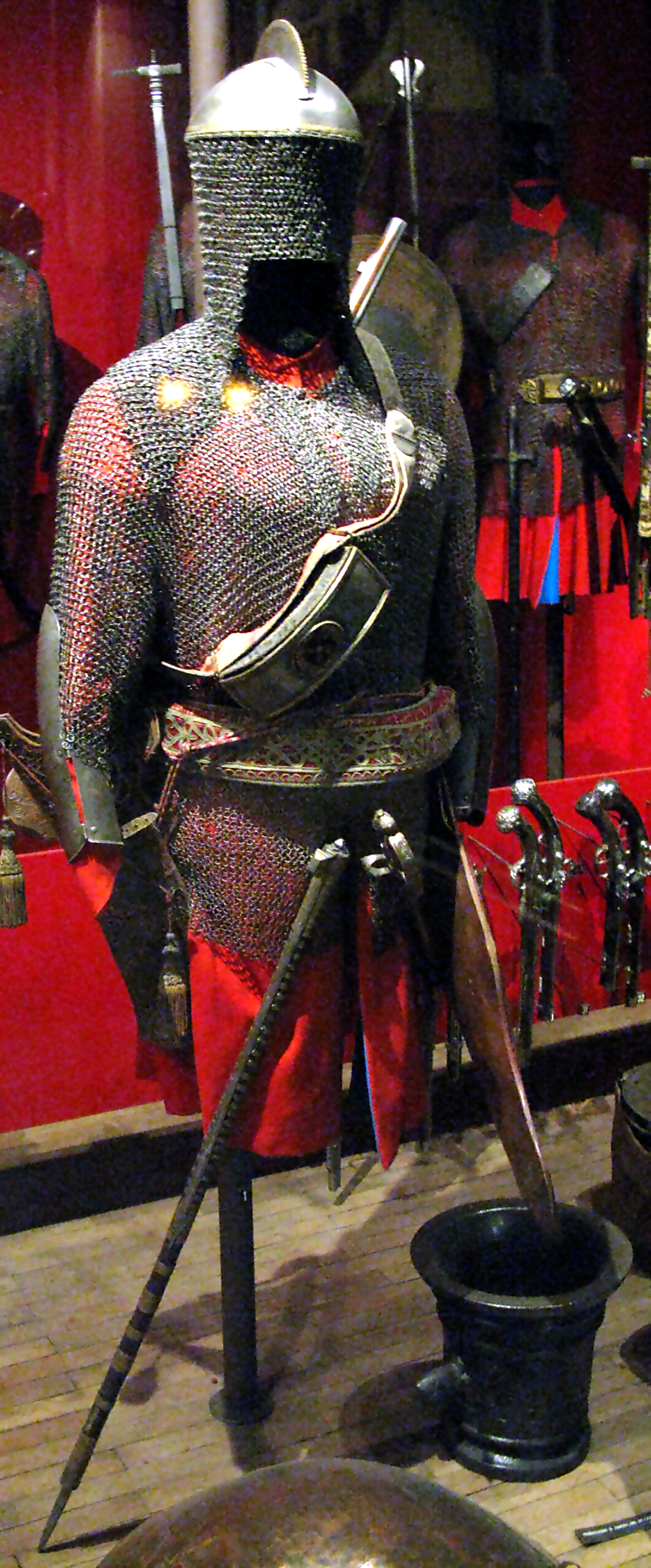
Armour and equipment of a Polish towarzysz pancerny, in the late 17th century at Muzeum Wojska Polskiego

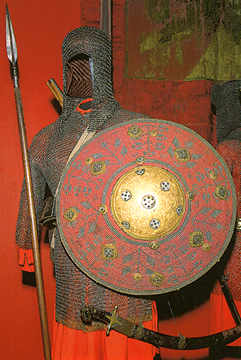
Chainmail, shield and weapons at Muzeum Wojska Polskiego

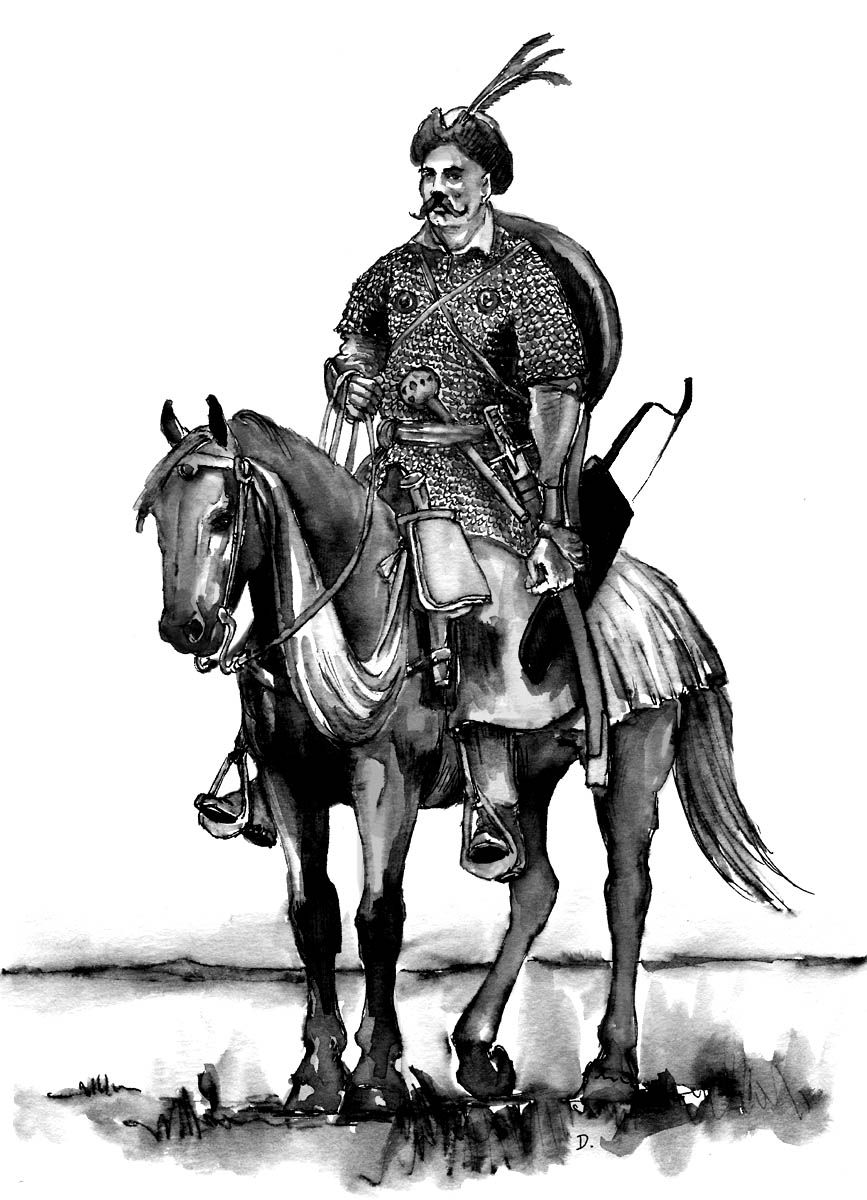
Towarzysz pancerny by Dariusz T. Wielec

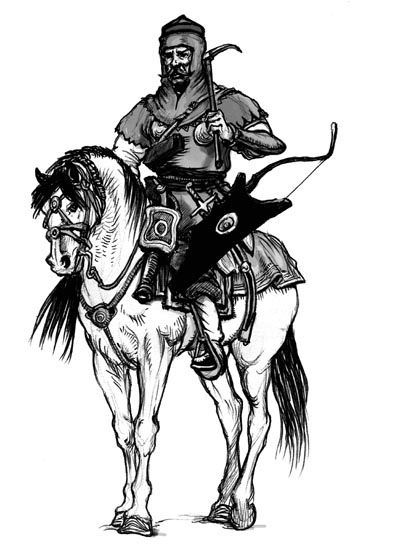
Pocztowy pancerny by Dariusz T. Wielec

== See also ==
- Polish cavalry
- Towarzysz
- Poczet
- Pocztowy
- Offices in the Polish-Lithuanian Commonwealth
- Petyhorcy
- Druzhina
