= The Nicolaus Copernicus University Press =

The Nicolaus Copernicus University Press (Wydawnictwo Naukowe Uniwersytetu Mikołaja Kopernika, Wydawnictwo Naukowe UMK, Wydawnictwo UMK) is a book publisher founded in 1967. NCU Press is an official department of Nicolaus Copernicus University in Toruń (Poland).

The Nicolaus Copernicus University Press was set up in 1967. It publishes scientific journals, monographs and textbooks and books written by the university scientists.

== See also ==
- Nicolaus Copernicus University in Toruń
