= Companion (military rank) =

Cavalry officer in the army of the Polish–Lithuanian Commonwealth

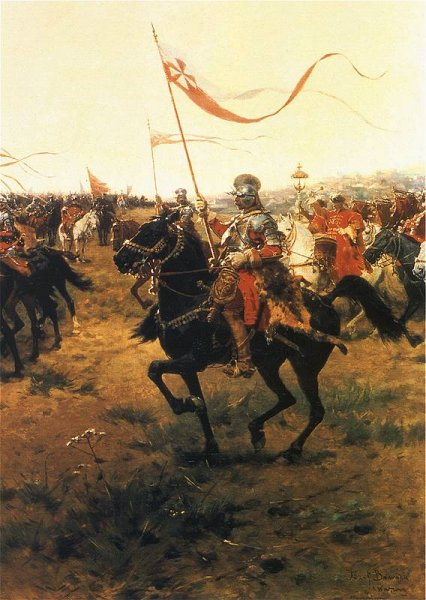
Towarzysz husarski

Companion (Polish: towarzysz Polish: [tɔˈvaʐɨʂ], plural: towarzysze) was a junior cavalry officer or knight-officer in the army of the Polish–Lithuanian Commonwealth from the 16th century until its demise in 1795.

== Name ==
During the 20th century, towarzysz assumed the same meaning as the Russian товарищ (tovarishch, "comrade"), with the military meaning fading in use. Use of cultural expressions such as pan ("sir") was frowned upon and the communist regime encouraged use of towarzysz ("companion") or obywatel ("citizen").

== Polish-Lithuanian Commonwealth ==
In the military of the Polish–Lithuanian Commonwealth, (until the 1775 AD reforms) companion was usually a noble who served in the Army for a period of time, usually less than 5 years, as a horseman with his mounted retainers (cavalry) and free servants (hussars, cossack – Armoured companion, Petyhorcy, Hajduk), or with none or one retainer and very few free servants (light cavalry e.g. Wallachian, Lisowczyks, Lithuanian Tatars), organized into banners/companies. His pay was relative to the type of cavalry unit he served, whether in (hussars, cossack – armoured companion), banners. He usually brought between 1 and 4 men (pocztowy or pacholiks) with him in his "retinue" (poczet) prescribed by his current military contract with his commander, the rotameister (rotmistrz), and the state. He armed, provisioned and commanded his retainers, and his free servants, that provided care for horses and weapons, forage, set up camp and mended equipment. In the light cavalry, a towarzysz usually fought with a very small poczet.

They were differentiated based on their horse unit origin, depending on whether they joined a heavy cavalry unit – (Towarzysz husarski of the Winged hussars), a medium cavalry banner – towarzysz kozacki (name change after 1648 AD – Armoured companion), a light cavalry banner – towarzysz lekkiego znaku etc. The richest and most prestigious were towarzysze that came from the winged hussar banners, but their own expenses' burden was the most excessive and grew as the 17th century progressed.

=== From 1775 ===
After 1775 reforms that modernized Polish-Lithuanian cavalry towarzysz was usually a lancer and head of the smallest unit in the National Cavalry, Pulk Jazdy Przedniej or other various guard cavalry regiments of the Commonwealth.

== In other European countries ==
=== Habsburg Empire ===
In the Habsburg Empire, after the Second Partition of Poland–Lithuania, in 1781 a Polish-style cavalry regiment under the name Galizische Adelige Leibgarde was organized, preserving the Towarzysz-pocztowy unit organization.

=== Russian Empire ===
In Russia, after the Third Partition of Poland–Lithuania in 1797, two Polish-based cavalry regiments were organized: Konnopolski Regiment and Lithuanian Horse Tatar Regiment along the lines of towarzysz-pocztowy organization.

=== Kingdom of Prussia ===
In the Prussian army under Frederick William II of Prussia and Frederick William III of Prussia, there were several cavalry regiments organized along the lines of towarzysz cavalry from the Polish, Lithuanians and Tatars in Prussian lands, with one cavalry regiment being called Towarzysz Regiment, organized in 1799. The regiment retained towarzysz and retainers structure and a Polish uhlan lance as the primary weapon, but this regiment did not survive Prussian collapse of 1806, where most men went into the army of the Duchy of Warsaw along with their horses and weapons. However other Polish-based regiments were converted to Uhlan regiments in 1807 and formed the basis for Prussian uhlan regiments until the end of Prussia.

== See also ==
- Druzhina
- Comrade
- Poczet
- Armoured companion
- Offices in the Polish–Lithuanian Commonwealth
