= 2nd Lithuanian National Cavalry Brigade =

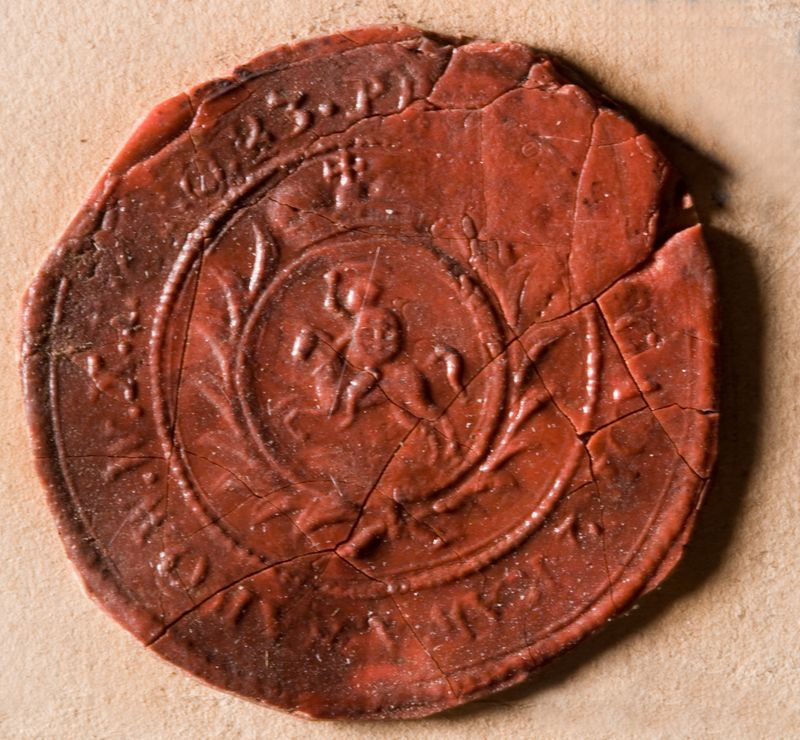
Seal of the brigade, 18th century

2nd Lithuanian National Cavalry Brigade (Polish: 2 Brygada Kawalerii Narodowej Wielkiego Księstwa Litewskiego) was one of the Lithuanian national cavalry brigades.
