= Rota (formation) =

Infantry or cavalry unit

A rota (Russian: рота, German: Rotte) is an infantry or cavalry unit. The term was used in the Bulgarian Army, the Czech Army, the Slovak Army, and the Russian Army and means "company."

After about 1630, the term was used to describe a file of 6-10 soldiers in formations (especially infantry) in the Polish army raised on the Foreign model. The units would consist of about 100 men, led by a rotamaster, or rotmistrz.

In Poland, the rota was known increasingly from the 16th century by the alternative name of Chorągiew. The term fell out of favor in the late 17th century.

== See also ==
- Choragiew
- Poczet
- Kopia
