= Rittmaster =

Military rank

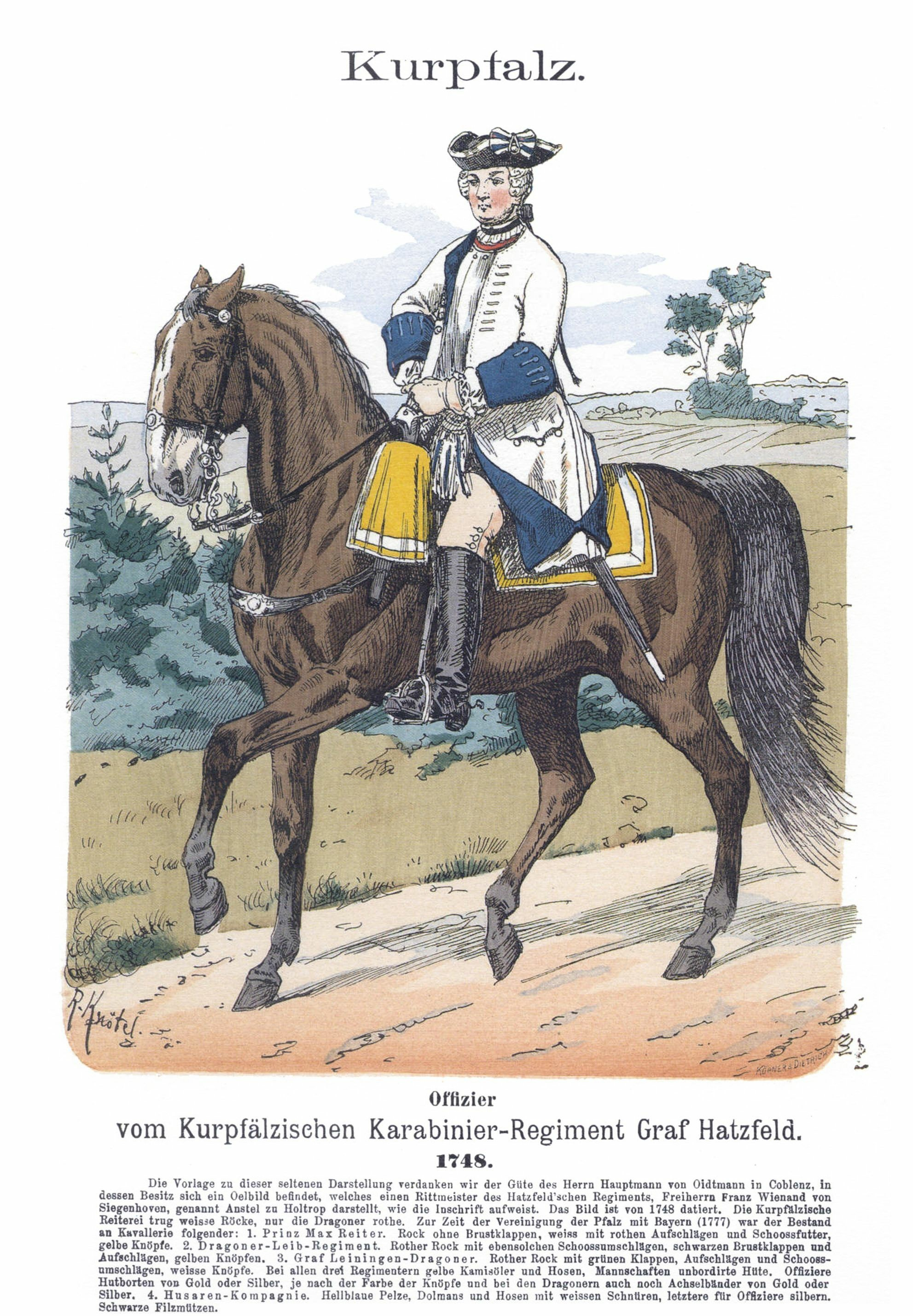
Rittmeister in the Karabinier-Regiment Graf Hatzfeld, 1748

Rittmaster (German: Rittmeister, lit. 'riding/cavalry master') is usually a commissioned officer military rank used in a few armies, usually equivalent to Captain. Historically it has been used in Germany, Austria-Hungary, Scandinavia, and some other countries.

A rittmeister is typically in charge of a squadron (a company-sized unit called a "troop" in the United States, as opposed to the U.S. cavalry squadron of larger battalion size), and is the equivalent of a Hauptmann rank (or captain in most army branches).

== Spelling ==
- Danish: ritmester
- Estonian: rittmeister
- German: Rittmeister (until 1951)
- Norwegian: rittmester (bokmål; the spelling ritmester was used until 1907) or rittmeister (nynorsk)
- Swedish: ryttmästare

The armies of many Central and Eastern European countries adopted a localised term for the similar rank.

- Czech: rotmistr
- Finnish: ratsumestari
- Lithuanian: rotmistras
- Polish: rotmistrz
- Russian: ротмистр, romanized: rotmistr

== Czech Republic ==
The rank of Rotmistr is an 'ensign' rank, used by both branches in the Czech Army. It is ranked OR-5 within the NATO rank structure. The immediate senior rank is called Nadrotmistr (lit. 'senior rittmaster') and is ranked OR-6.

== Netherlands ==
The Dutch rank Ritmeester, is the rank of squadron leading officers in the cavalry units of the Royal Netherlands Army.

== Norway ==
The Norwegian rank, Norwegian: rittmester/rittmeister, is the rank of officers in the armoured and mechanized infantry units of the Norwegian Army. The spelling ritmester was used in Norwegian until 1907.

== Historical use ==
In the Polish army (from the 15th century to the mid-20th century) a rotmistrz commanded a formation called a rota. However, a rotmistrz of hussars was a commander of between 100 and 180 hussars, with a lieutenant of hussars as his second-in-command. The Lithuanian term was rotmistras. In earlier times, the rotmistrz served as the commander of an infantry or cavalry company, though sometimes he would temporarily be assigned field rank tasks e.g. commanding an entire regiment or even a larger formation. In the cavalry, the rank continued until 1945 as a company level title. Applied to the commander of a troop, it was equivalent of a modern-day captain.

The rank was also adopted by Russian New Regiments as rotmistr (ротмистр) and later formalized in Table of Ranks as the cavalry post; until 1798, and between 1883 and 1918, a lower-ranking shtabs-rotmistr (штабс-ротмистр) also existed, representing the ranks of Senior Captain and Junior Captain in the Russian Imperial Guards Cavalry, Army Cavalry, Gendarmerie and Border Guards by 1914.

In British and Commonwealth military forces, a Riding Master is not a rank. In the Household Cavalry Regiment a suitable Warrant Officer with the rank of Riding Instructors is appointed Riding Master. The duration of this appointment is determined by the commanding Lieutenant-Colonel and, once appointed, the Riding Master is the person in the lead of training of recruits and horses of the Household Cavalry Regiment.

== NATO code ==
While the rank is used in some of NATO countries, it is ranked differently depending on the country.

NATO code	Country	English equivalent	
NATO code	Country	UK	US
Officers
OF-2	Netherlands, Norway	Captain	
Other ranks
OR-7	Slovakia	Staff sergeant	Sergeant first class
OR-5	Czech Republic	Sergeant	

== Insignia ==
=== Current ===
Rotmistr
(Czech Land Forces)

Rotmajster
(Slovak Ground Forces)

Ritmeester
(Royal Netherlands Army)

Rittmester
(Norwegian Army)

=== Former ===
Rotmistr
(Government Army of Bohemia and Moravia)

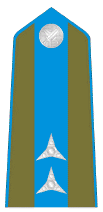
Rotmistr
(Czechoslovak Army)

Ritmester
(Royal Danish Army)

Rittmeister
(German Army)

Rotmistrz
(Polish Land Forces)

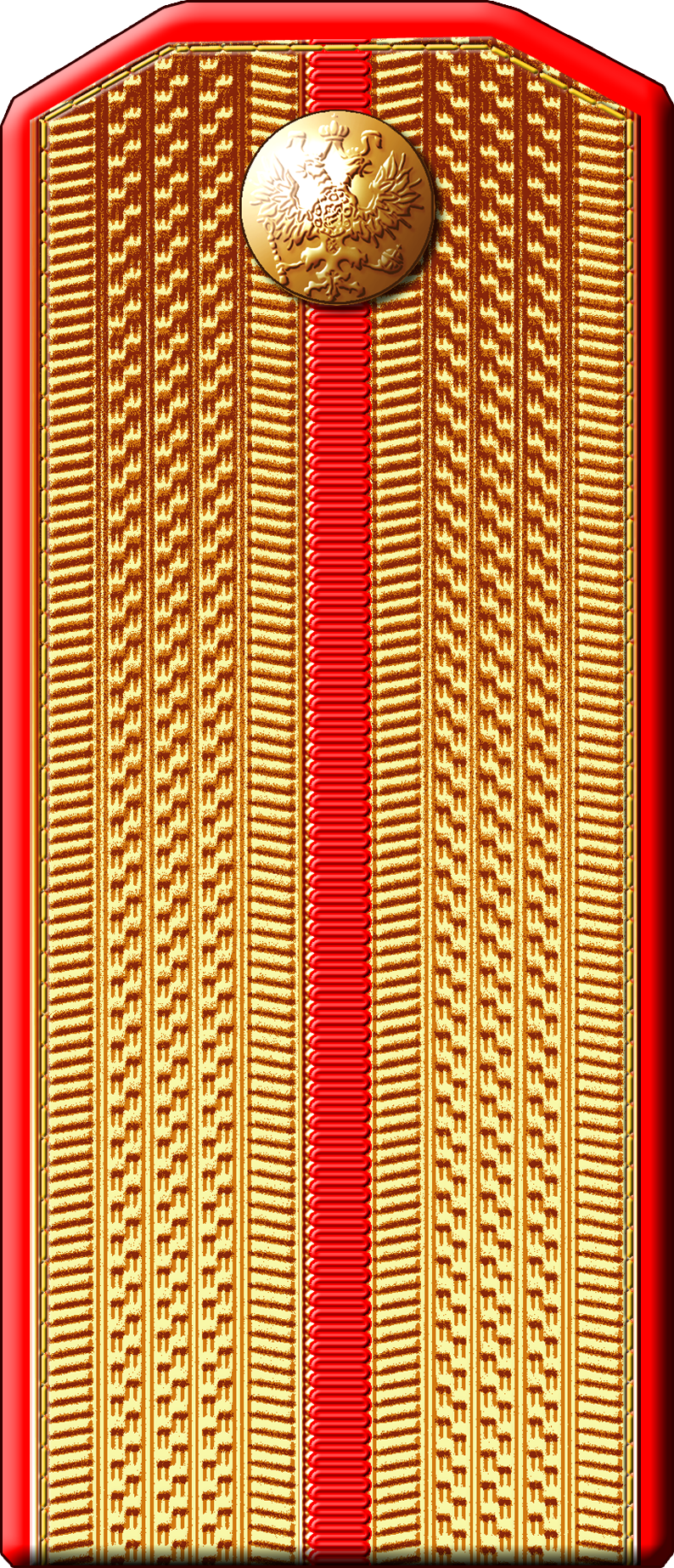
Ротмистр
Rotmistr
(Imperial Russian Army)

== See also ==
- Comparative military ranks
- Comparative military ranks of World War I
