= Chorągiew =

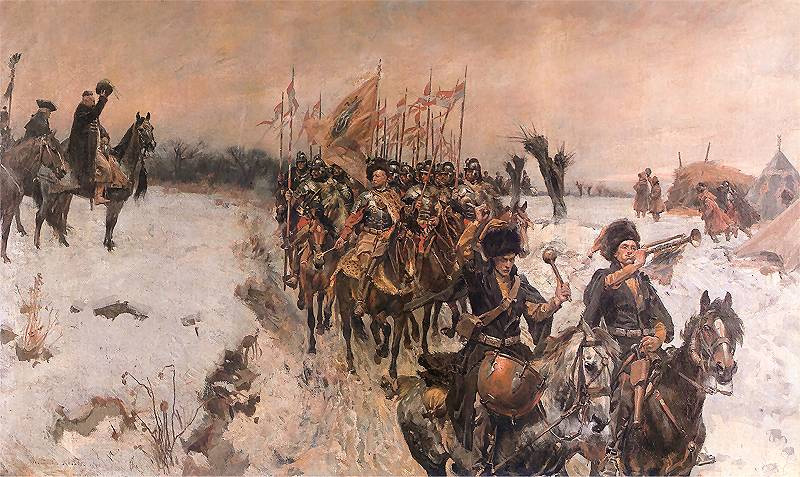
"Chorągiew pancerna of rotmistrz Józef Hulewicz" painted by Wojciech Kossak

Chorągiew (Polish pronunciation: [xɔˈrɔŋɡʲɛf]; literally: "banner") was the basic administrative unit of the Polish and Lithuanian cavalry from the 14th century. An alternative name until the 17th century was rota.

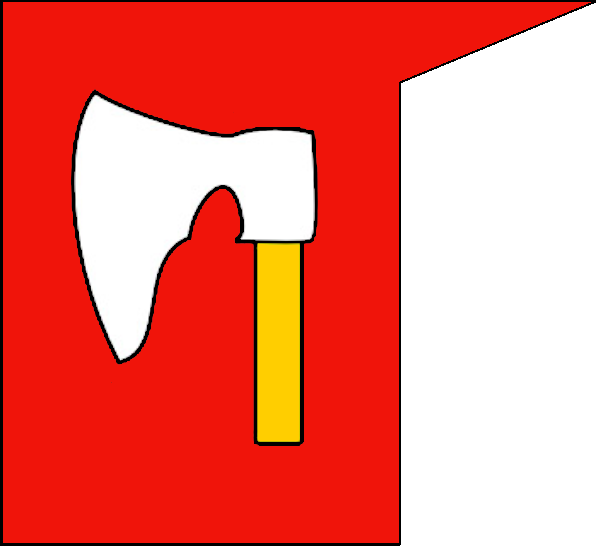
Banner of the Topór clan in the Battle of Grunwald.

== 14th to 17th centuries ==
Between the 14th and 17th century the Chorągiew was composed of smaller sub-units – the Poczet.

Types of Chorągiew were:

- Chorągiew ziemska (District banner), formed by knights of a district.
- Chorągiew rodowa (Clan banner), formed by clans.
- Chorągiew nadworna (Court banner), formed by troops of the King.

== 15th century (2nd half) to 18th century (1st half) ==
In the cavalry, from the second half of the 15th century until the first half of the 18th century, a Chorągiew was formed according to the "companion system" (system zaciągu towarzyskiego). See: Towarzysz (companion).

Types of Chorągiew were:

- Chorągiew husarska (Hussar banner), formed by Hussars.
- Chorągiew lekka ("Light" banner), formed by light-cavalry.
- Chorągiew pancerna ("Armoured" banner), formed by Pancerni.
- Chorągiew tatarska (Tatar banner), formed by Tatars.
- Chorągiew wołoska (Vlach banner), light cavalry, not only formed by Vlachs.
- Chorągiew kozacka (Cossack banner), light cavalry, not only formed by Cossacks.

Typical family/village clans of the Chorągiew Rodowa who provided men for battles consisting of approximately 100 men were:

- Topór, Dołęga and Gryf

== Gallery ==
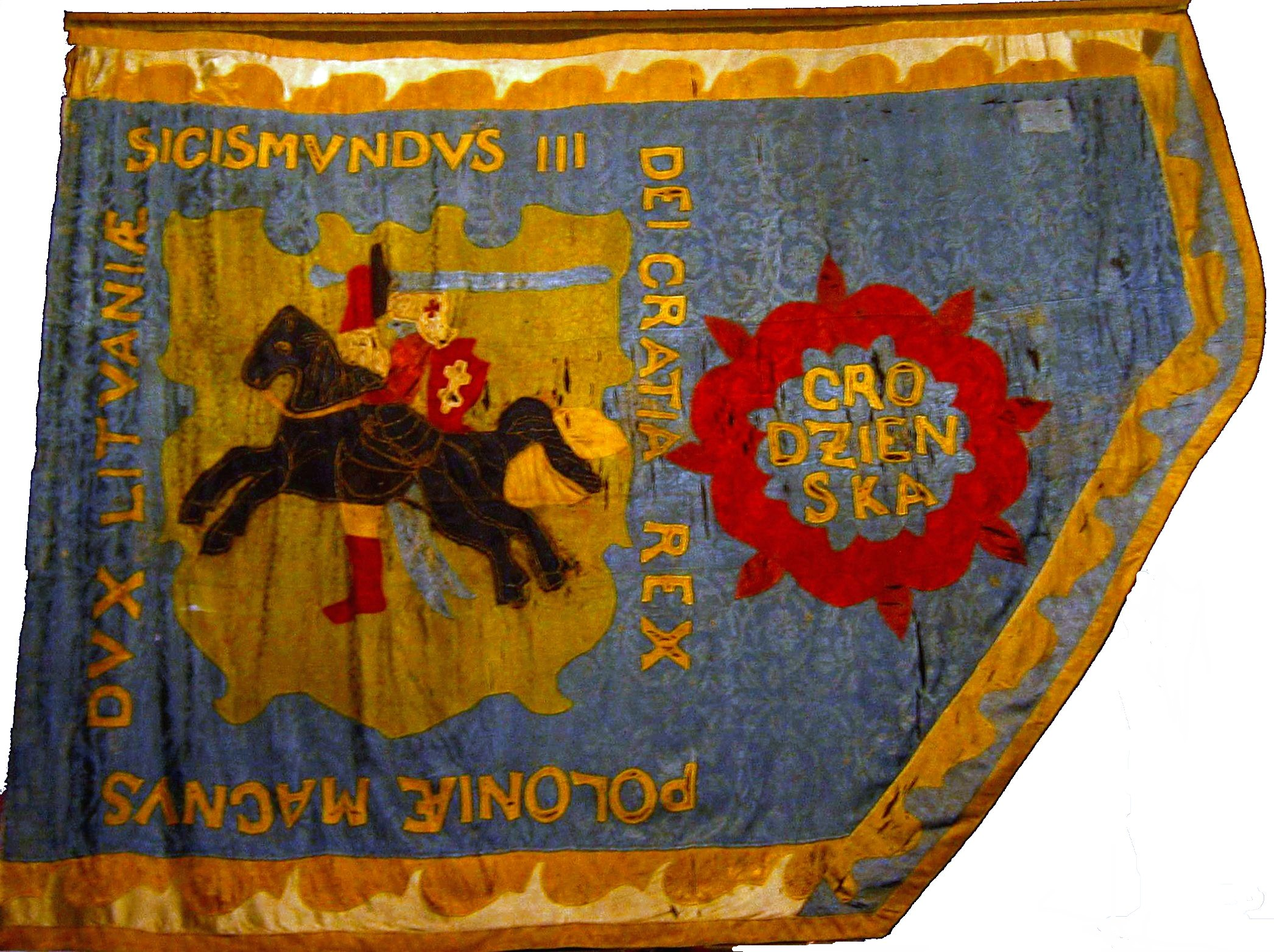
District Banner of the Land of Grodno (1613–1619)

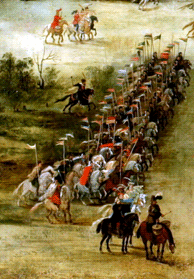
A Hussar banner during the Battle of Kircholm in 1605

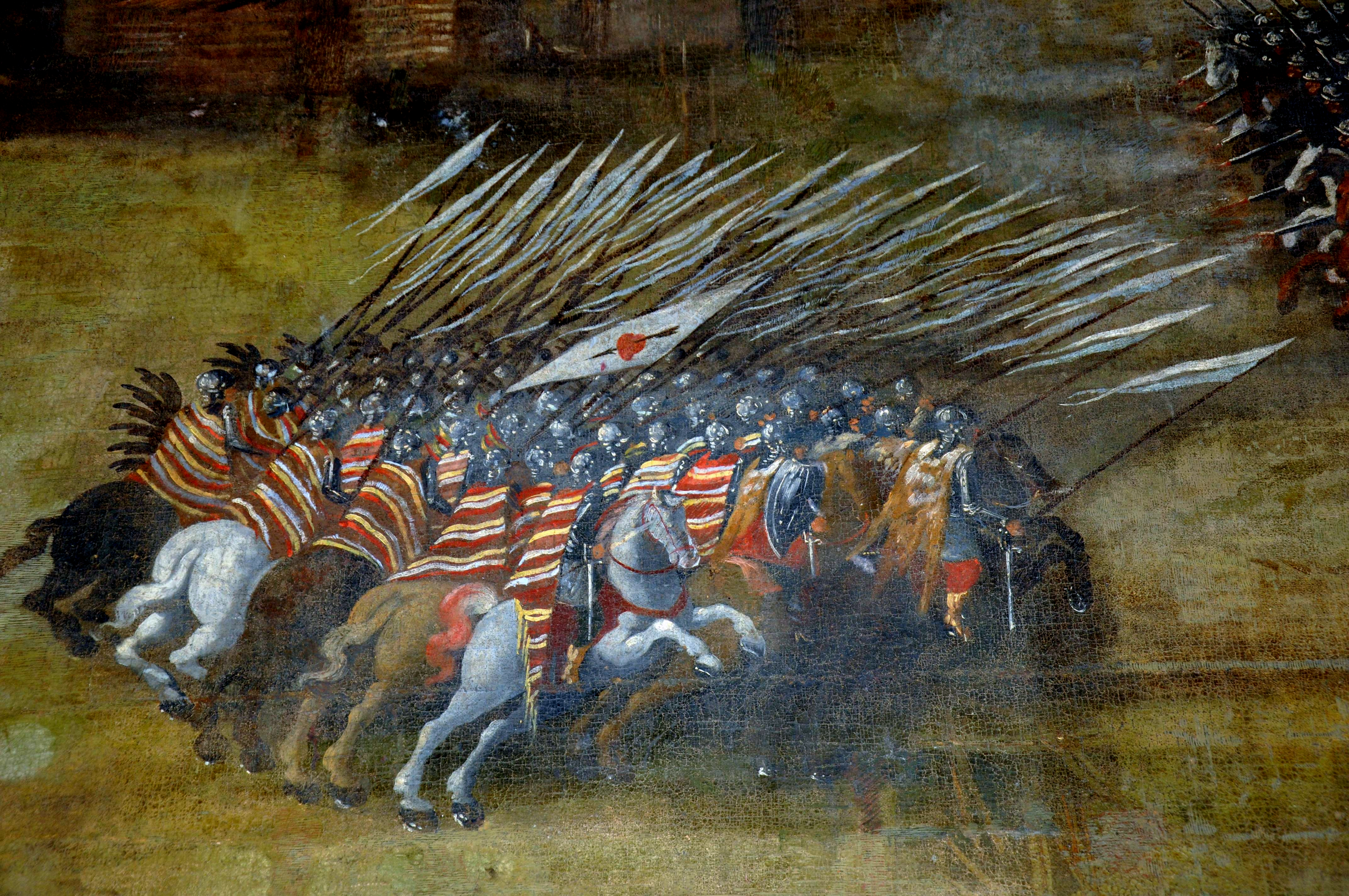
A Hussar banner during the Battle of Kluszyn in 1610
