= Poczet =

Polish military unit

Poczet (Polish: [ˈpɔt͡ʂɛt], "fellowship" or "retinue"; plural poczty) was the smallest organized unit of soldiers in the Crown Army and later also the Grand Ducal Lithuanian Army from the 15th until the 18th century. The name of a medium or heavy-cavalry soldier in a poczet was pocztowy.

In the cavalry, each poczet was commanded by a Companion or Armoured companion. Several poczets were combined to form larger units like a banner (the equivalent of a Western company). In this context the poczet is the equivalent of the medieval Lance fournie.

A pocztowy was an assistant and subordinate to the Companion, and usually a peasant. In some respects this role was similar to the older page or squire of a knight. He was armoured like his superior, but fought in the second or third line and was responsible for guarding his back and flanks in a battle.

== See also ==
- Offices in the Polish–Lithuanian Commonwealth
