= List of battles 1601–1800 =

== 1601–1620 ==
Year	War	Battle	Loc.	Date(s)	Description
1601	Polish–Swedish War	Battle of Wenden	(Latvia)	7 Jan	First encounter between Swedish reiters and Polish hussars.
1601	Anglo-Spanish War	Capture of Portobello	(Panama)	17 Jan	English expedition assaults, occupies and loots Spanish Portobelo.
1601	Eighty Years' War and Anglo-Spanish War	Siege of Rheinberg	(Germany)	12 June—2 Aug	Siege of the towns of Rheinberg and Meurs. Rheinberg capitulates on 28 July after a Spanish relief force failed to relieve the city; Meurs surrenders 2 August.
1601	Polish–Swedish War	Battle of Kokenhausen	(Latvia)	23 June	
1601	Eighty Years' War and Anglo-Spanish War	Siege of Ostend	(Belgium)	5 July 1601 – 20 Sep 1604	Three-year siege of the city of Ostend.
1601	Clan MacDonald—Clan MacLeod feud	Battle of Carinish	(Scotland)	Summer	Scottish clan battle ending with a MacDonald victory.
1601	Clan MacDonald—Clan MacLeod feud	Battle of Coire Na Creiche	(Scotland)	Summer	Scottish clan battle ending with a MacDonald victory.
1601	Long Turkish War	Battle of Guruslău	(Romania)	3 Aug	Battle between Wallachia-Austrian and Transylvanian-Moldavian troops ends in a Wallachian-Austrian victory. Transylvania is taken out from the Ottoman suzerainty.
1601	Nine Years' War	Siege of Donegal	(Republic of Ireland)	Aug	Tyrone's rebels abandon the siege and move south to Munster, where they take part in the Battle of Kinsale.
1601	Long Turkish War	Siege of Nagykanizsa	(Hungary)	9 Sep—18 Nov	Ottoman Turks of Nagykanizsa fort defeat an invading Habsburg army.
1601	Spanish colonization of the Americas and Mexican-Indian Wars	Battle at Etzanoa	(United States)	Sep	Battle between the Escanjaque and New Spain near present-day Arkansas City.
1601	Nine Years' War	Siege of Kinsale	(Republic of Ireland)	2 Oct 1601 – 3 Jan 1602	Irish rebels and supporting Spanish are defeated by England.
1601	Polish–Swedish War	Siege of Wolmar	(Latvia)	18 Oct—18 Dec	Swedes hold back the Polish until 8 December, when Wolmar is bombarded with cannons. Swedes surrendered ten days later.
1601	Eighty Years' War and Anglo-Spanish War	Siege of 's-Hertogenbosch	(Netherlands)	1–27 Nov	Unsuccessful Dutch attempt to capture the city of 's-Hertogenbosch.
1601	Nine Years' War	Battle of Castlehaven	(Republic of Ireland)	6 Dec	British naval victory, wherein five of the six Spanish Armada ships are destroyed or captured, while Great Britain did not lose any.
1601	Dutch–Portuguese War	Battle of Bantam	(Indonesia)	27 Dec	Portuguese forced to retreat from a fleet of five Dutch ships, despite having eight galleons and several fustas.
1602	Nine Years' War	Battle of Kinsale	(Republic of Ireland)	3 Jan	Campaign headed by O'Neill, O'Donnell and other Irish lords at the climax of the war.
1602	Polish–Swedish War	Siege of Fellin	(Estonia)	25 March—17 May	Polish and Lithuanian forces led by Grand Crown Hetman Jan Zamoyski besiege the Swedish-held town of Fellin.
1602	Polish–Swedish War	Siege of Weissenstein	(Estonia)	31 May—30 Sep	Polish-Lithuanian army of 2,000 troops besiege Weissenstein. The Swedes capitulate on 30 September.
1602	Persian-Uzbek Wars	Battle of Balkh	(Afghanistan)	June	Khanate of Bukhara decisively repel attempted invasion by Safavid Iran.
1602	Anglo-Spanish War	Battle of Sesimbra Bay	(Portugal)	3 June	Between an English naval expeditionary force of five galleons and a Spanish fleet of 11 galleys, a large carrack and help from a fort and shore batteries.
1602	Nine Years' War	Siege of Dunboy	(Republic of Ireland)	5–18 June	Battle between the Irish and English crown at Dunboy Castle, a stronghold of Donal Cam O'Sullivan Beare.
1602	Polish–Swedish War	Battle of Reval	(Estonia)	30 June	Polish break Swedish lines at Tallinn.
1602	Nine Years' War	Burning of Dungannon	(Northern Ireland)	June	Beginning of the final stage of Tyrone's Rebellion.
1602	Eighty Years' War and Anglo-Spanish War	Siege of Grave	(Netherlands)	18 July—20 Sep	Netherlands and Great Britain capture Grave from Spain.
1602	Eighty Years' War and Anglo-Spanish War	Battle of the Narrow Seas	(England) / (Netherlands)	3–4 Oct	An English and Dutch fleet of nine galleons, carracks and galiots intercept and attack six Spanish galleys.
1602		L'Escalade	(Switzerland)	11–12 Dec	Failed attempt by Catholic Savoy to conquer Protestant Geneva, resulting in a peace treaty in July 1603.
1602	Scottish clan wars	Battle of Morar	(Scotland)		Clan battle near Loch Morar between the Clan MacDonell of Glengarry and the Clan Mackenzie, who were supported by the Clan Ross.
1603	Scottish clan wars	Battle of Glen Fruin	(Scotland)	7 Feb	Clan battle between the Clan Gregor and the Clan Colquhoun and their respective allies.
1603	Anglo-Spanish War	Battle of Puerto Caballos	(Honduras)	17 Feb	Successful British campaign to capture Puerto Caballos.
1603	Polish–Swedish War	Battle of Rakvere	(Estonia)	5 March	Jan Karol Chodkiewicz defeats the Swedish relief force of 2,000 with 1,000 men.
1603	Anglo-Spanish War	Raid on Santiago de Cuba	(Cuba)	12 May	Santiago de Cuba is attacked and sacked by English privateers near the end of the war.
1603	Eighty Years' War	Battle of Sluis	(Netherlands)	26 May	Spanish fleet of eight galleys is defeated by the Dutch fleet of three men of war, two galleys and several smaller vessels. The Spanish commander Spinola dies.
1603	Long Turkish War	Battle of Brașov	(Romania)	17 July	Wallachia-Habsburg troops led by Șerban fight Transylvanian-Moldavian troops led by Székely. Monarchy victory.
1603	Ottoman–Safavid war	Capture of Tabriz	(Iran)	1–21 Oct	Tabriz is captured by Shah Abbas I's Safavid army from the Ottoman Turks after 20 days fighting.
1603	Long Turkish War	Siege of Buda	(Hungary)	20 Sep—20 Nov	The Holy Roman Empire fails to capture Buda from the Ottoman Empire.
1604	Eighty Years' War and Anglo-Spanish War	Siege of Sluis	(Netherlands)	19 May—19 Aug	Dutch and English armies take Cadzand, Aardenburg and IJzendijke in the Spanish Netherlands, leading to a siege of the Spanish-held inland port of Sluis.
1604	Anglo-Spanish War	Battle of the Gulf of Cadiz	(Portugal) / (Spain)	7 Aug	Two Spanish galleons engage two English privateers plundering shipping lanes and villages around the Gulf of Cádiz.
1604	Polish–Swedish War	Battle of Weissenstein	(Estonia)	25 Sep	Polish-Lithuanian victory over Sweden.
1604	Polish–Russian War	Battle of Novhorod-Siverskyi	(Ukraine)	31 Dec	First major battle of False Dmitry I against Boris Godunov.
1604	Ottoman–Safavid war	Battle of Urmia	(Iran)		Decisive Safavid victory over the Ottoman Empire.
1604		Battle of Lješkopolje	(Montenegro)		12,000-strong army clashes with 400 Montenegrins in Lješanska nahija. The battle lasted through the night; at dawn, Montenegrins launched a sudden charge, surprising the enemy and causing a retreat.
1605	Polish–Muscovite War	Battle of Dobrynichi	(Russia)	21 Jan	Pretender to the Russian throne is defeated, but escapes.
1605	Polish–Muscovite War	Siege of Kromy	(Russia)	Feb—May	Last major clash between Godunov's troops and False Dmitry I's.
1605	Polish–Swedish War	Battle of Kircholm	(Latvia)	27 Sep	Polish hussars cavalry is outnumbered and defeated by the Swedish.
1605	Eighty Years' War	Siege of Wachtendonk	(Germany)	8–28 Oct	Spain captures Wachtendonk from the Netherlands.
1605	Eighty Years' War	Battle of Mülheim	(Germany)	9 Oct	Spain defeats the Netherlands.
1605	Ottoman–Safavid war	Battle of Sufiyan	(Iran)	6 Nov	Safavid victory over the Ottoman Empire.
1605	Mughal-Persian Wars	Siege of Kandahar	(Afghanistan)	Nov 1605 – Jan 1606	Safavid governor of Herat moves to recapture Kandahar while the Mughals are distracted by the death of Emperor Akbar.
1606	Tatar raids on the Commonwealth	Battle of Udycz	(Ukraine)	28 Jan	Polish forces defeat Crimean Tatars near Udych River.
1606		Battle of Gol	(Ethiopia)	10 March	Susenyos defeats the combined armies of Yaqob and Abuna Petros II, making him Emperor of Ethiopia.
1606	Eighty Years' War	Siege of Groenlo	(Germany)	3 Aug—9 Nov	Forces led by Spinola take the city, which remained in Spanish hands until 1627.
1606	Dutch–Portuguese War	Battle of Cape Rachado	(Malaysia)	16–18 Aug	Portuguese naval victory against the Dutch East India Company.
1606	Eighty Years' War	Siege of Rheinberg	(Germany)	22 Aug—1 Oct	Spain captures Rheinberg from the Netherlands.
1606	Dutch–Portuguese War	Siege of Malacca	(Malaysia)		Portuguese garrison hold off Dutch invaders until reinforcements arrive. Dutch retreat.
1606	Ottoman–Safavid war (1603–1612)	Siege of Ganja	(Azerbaijan)		Safavids recapture city from the Ottomans.
1607	Eighty Years' War	Battle of Gibraltar	(Gibraltar)	25 April	Dutch fleet destroys anchored Spanish fleet.
1607	Zebrzydowski Rebellion	Battle of Guzów	(Poland)	6 July	Polish Royalists defeat the Zebrzydowski rebels.
1607	Polish–Russian War	Battle of Kozelsk	(Russia)	8 Oct	The first victory of False Dmitry II against the government of Tsar Vasili IV Shiusk.
1607		Raid on Bone	(Algeria)		Raid by the Tuscan Order of St. Stephen against the Ottoman town of Bône.
1608		Battle of Ebenat	(Ethiopia)	17 Jan	Emperor Susenyos surprises an Oromo army, killing 12,000 Oromo at a cost of 400 soldiers.
1608	Polish–Muscovite War	Battle of Zaraysk	(Russia)	9 April	Lisowczyks defeat troops loyal to Vasili IV of Russia.
1608	Polish–Muscovite War	Battle of Bolkhov	(Russia)	10–11 May	False Dmitry II's troops defeat the army of Tsar Vasili IV Shiusk.
1608	Polish–Muscovite War	Battle of Medvezhiy Brod	(Russia)	June	False Dmitry II's troops defeat the Lisowczyks.
1608	O'Doherty's rebellion	Battle of Kilmacrennan	(Republic of Ireland)	5 July	Skirmish fought near Kilmacrennan.
1608	Polish–Swedish War	Capture of Daugavgrīva	(Latvia)	27 July—5 Aug	Sweden captures Daugavgrīva.
1608	Polish–Muscovite War	Siege of Troitsky monastery	(Russia)	23 Sep 1608 – 12 Jan 1610	The Polish–Lithuanian irregular army under False Dmitry II launch at 16-month siege to capture the Trinity Monastery.
1609	Polish–Swedish War	Siege of Pärnu	(Estonia)	28 Feb—2 March	Polish–Lithuanian miners blow up three of the main gates of the city, allowing Lithuanian troops to fight their way to the city's centre and capture the city from Sweden.
1609	Polish–Swedish War	Battle of Salis	(Latvia)	23–24 March	Polish ambush and defeat Swedes heading towards Riga.
1609	Polish–Muscovite War	Battle of Kamenka	(Russia)	25 May	
1609	Georgian–Ottoman Wars	Battle of Tashiskari	(Georgia (country))	16 June	Kartlian rebels led by Saakadze defeat Ottoman forces.
1609	Polish–Russian War	Battle of Torzhok	(Russia)	17 June	Russia and Sweden defeat Poland-Lithuania.
1609	Polish–Russian War	Battle of Tver	(Russia)	21–23 July	Russia and Sweden defeat Poland-Lithuania.
1609	Ottoman–Habsburg wars	Battle of Paphos	(Cyprus)	July	Ottoman victory over Hospitaller Malta.
1609	Beaver Wars	Iroquois War	(United States)	30 July	Two Frenchmen and 60 native Hurons encounter a group of 200 Iroquois near present-day Ticonderoga and Crown Point, New York. The Hurons and the French route the enemy, killing 50 and taking twelve prisoners, whom they tortured to death.
1609	Polish–Russian War	Battle of Kaljazin	(Russia)	18 Aug	
1609	Polish–Russian War	Siege of Smolensk	(Russia)	23 Sep 1609 – 13 June 1611	Polish capture Smolensk.
1609	Polish–Swedish War	Battle of Daugavgrīva	(Latvia)	6 Oct	Lithuanian troops set a trap for the Swedish by way of an abandoned campsite. When the Swedish invaded the campsite, the Lithuanians attacked from the surrounding forest.
1609	Polish–Swedish War	Battle of Troitsko	(Russia)	28 Oct	
1609	Arauco War	Battle of Purén	(Chile)	31 Dec	Spain defeats the Mapuche.
1609	Arauco War	Battle of Purén	(Chile)	31 Dec	Spain defeats the Mapuche.
1610	Polish–Muscovite War	Battle of Rzjov	(Russia)	April	
1610	Polish–Muscovite War	Siege of Tsaryovo-Zaymishche	(Russia)	16 June—26 July	Polish capture the fort from the Russians.
1610	Slave Revolts in North America	Spanish attack on San Lorenzo maroons	(Mexico)		Spanish troop went to battle against Maroons under Gaspar Yanga resulting in heavy losses by both sides resulting in stalemate with no conclusive victory.
1610		Siege of Dimdim	(Iran)	Nov 1609-Summer 1610	Safavids capture Dimdim Castle from the rebelling Kurdish Emirate of Bradost.
1610	Polish–Swedish War	Battle of Klusina	(Russia)	24 June	
1610	Polish–Russian War and Time of Troubles	Battle of Kluszyn	(Russia)	4 July	Polish army defeats Russians and Swedes.
1610	War of the Jülich Succession	Siege of Jülich	(Germany)	28 July—2 Sep	Netherlands and France capture Jülich from Spain and Austria.
1611	Kalmar War	Siege of Kalmar	(Sweden)	3 May—3 Aug	Major part of an intensive conflict between Denmark–Norway and Sweden.
1611	Kalmar War	Storming of Kristianopel	(Sweden)	26 June	The Swedes manage to siege the fortified city.
1611	Ingrian War	Capture of Novgorod	(Russia)	8–17 July	
1612	Kalmar War	Battle of Vittsjö	(Sweden)	11 Feb	Denmark-Norway defeats Sweden
1612	Moldavian Magnate Wars	Battle of Cornul lui Sas	(Romania)	9 July	Moldavia, the Ottoman Empire and the Crimean Khanate defeat Poland-Lithuania and the Moldavian opposition.
1612	Kalmar War	Battle of Kringen	(Norway)	26 Aug	Norwegian peasant militia ambush Scottish mercenary soldiers on their way to enlist in the Swedish army.
1612		Battle of Surat	(India)	29 Aug	English naval victory over the Portuguese.
1612	Polish–Muscovite War	Battle of Moscow	(Russia)	1 & 3 Sep	Two battles ending in tactical Russian victories.
1612		Battle of Swally	(India)	9–10 Dec	English East India Company naval victory over the Portuguese.
1613	Battle of Aïn Charbou		(Algeria)		An engagement between the forces of Abd al-Samad al-Shabi and those of Murad Bey, fought as part of the conflict between the Shabiyya and the authorities of the Beylik of Tunis.
1613	Ingrian War and Time of Troubles	Siege of Tikhvin	(Russia)	4 June—25 Sep	Local Streltsy and noblemen rise up against and destroy the Swedish garrison. The Swedes burn Tikhvin but could not take the Assumption Monastery.
1613	Spanish–Ottoman wars and Ottoman–Habsburg wars	Battle of Cape Corvo	(Turkey)	Aug	Spanish squadron from Sicily engage an Ottoman fleet as part of the struggle for the control of the Mediterranean Sea.
1613	Polish–Muscovite War	Siege of Smolensk	(Russia)	Aug 1613 – May 1617	Russian troops lead a protracted and unsuccessful siege of the city, during which no attempt was made to assault. The siege is lifted at the beginning of 1617.
1613		Battle of Port Royal	(Canada)	Oct	Argall leads a force from Virginia to attack Acadia, destroying Port Royal and other French outposts in eastern Canada.
1614	Spanish–Ottoman wars and Ottoman–Habsburg wars	Raid on Żejtun	(Malta)	6–12 July	The last major attack made by the Ottoman Empire against the island of Malta, which was then ruled by the Order of St. John.
1614	Ingrian War	Battle of Bronnitsy	(Russia)	16 July	Sweden defeats Russia.
1614	War of the Jülich Succession	Siege of Aachen	(Germany)	Late Aug	Spanish Army of Flanders marches from Maastricht to Aachen to support Count Palatine. Spanish victory.
1614	Post-Sengoku period	Siege of Osaka	(Japan)	8 Nov 1614 – 22 Jan 1615	Battles between the Tokugawa shogunate and the Toyotomi clan, ultimately ending in the clan's destruction.
1614	Portuguese colonization of the Americas	Battle of Guaxenduba	(Brazil)	19 Nov	Portugal defeats France.
1614	Post-Sengoku period and Siege of Osaka	Battle of Shigino	(Japan)	26 Nov	Undecided battle. Five thousand Tokugawa troops, led by Uesugi, engage 2000 troops loyal to the Toyotomi clan at Shigino.
1614	Post-Sengoku period and Siege of Osaka	Battle of Imafuku	(Japan)	Late Nov	Tokugawa attacks and captures the village of Imafuku by defeating Toyotomi clan forces.
1615	War of the Montferrat Succession	Battle of Asti	(Italy)	11 May	Spain defeats Savoy Monferrat.
1615	Post-Sengoku period	Battle of Kashii	(Japan)	26 May	Tokugawa forces defeat Toyotomi forces during the conflict over Osaka.
1615	Early Edo period and Siege of Osaka	Battle of Yao	(Japan)	2 June	Battle between the Tōdō clan and the Chōsokabe clan intended to destroy the Toyotomi clan. Tõdõ clan victory.
1615	Early Edo period and Siege of Osaka	Battle of Tennōji	(Japan)	3 June	Final defeat of Toyotomi, son of Hideyoshi.
1615	Early Edo period and Siege of Osaka	Battle of Dōmyōji	(Japan)	5 June	The Eastern Army of Tokugawa and the Osaka Army of Toyotomi clash in Battle of Dōmyōji. This battle is one of Japan's major historical battles between samurai forces.
1615	Cossack raids	Cossack raid on Istanbul	(Turkey)	June	The Cossacks successfully penetrate the capital of the Ottoman Empire, enter its harbor and burn ships before returning to their base.
1615	Ingrian War	Siege of Pskov	(Russia)	9 Aug—27 Oct	Swedes are prevented from taking Pskov with heavy losses. After two and a half months, the Swedes withdraw from Pskov to Narva.
1615		Battle of Oneida	(United States)	16 Oct	Champlain, aided by 10 Frenchmen and 300 Hurons, attack the stockaded Oneida village.
1615	Acehnese–Portuguese conflicts	Battle of Formoso River	(Malaysia)	27 Nov—2 Dec	The Portuguese Navy defeats Aceh.
1615	Spanish–Ottoman wars	Action off La Goulette	(Tunisia)	Dec	Spanish privateer squadron under Ribera defeat a Tunisian fleet.
1615		Siege of Braunschweig	(Germany)		Duke Friedrich Ulrich lays siege to Braunschweig until Hanseatic and Dutch relief forces arrive.
1615	Uskok War	Battle of Zaule	(Italy)		Venetians with a galley and several smaller ships occupy the Zaule salt pan and begin to destroy it.
1615	Kakhetian Uprising	Battle of Tsitsamuri	(Georgia (country))		Kingdom of Kakheti battles the Safavid domination. Kakheti victory.
1616	Ahom-Mughal conflicts	Battle of Samdhara	(India)	Jan	Ahom kingdom victory over the Mughal Empire.
1616	Spanish–Ottoman wars	Battle of Cape Celidonia	(Turkey)	14–16 July	A small Spanish fleet of five galleons and a patache cruising off Cyprus is attacked by an Ottoman fleet of 55 galleys. The Spanish ships manage to repel the Ottomans, inflicting heavy losses.
1616		Battle of Toppur	(India)	Late 1616	Disintegration of the already declining Vijayanagara Empire. One of the largest battles in the history of South Asia.
1616		Siege of Vercelli	(Italy)		Spanish forces capture the Savoyard fortress.
1617	Eighty Years' War	Second Battle of Playa Honda	(Philippines)	14–15 April	Spanish victory in the Philippines outside Manila Bay. This naval battle decided the future of the Philippines for centuries to come.
1617		Sacking of Saint Thomas of Guyana	(Venezuela)		Raleigh's second El Dorado expeditions sack the second settlement of Santo Tomé de Guayana.
1618	Polish–Muscovite War	Battle of Mozhaysk	(Russia)	Jan–July	Precursor to the Siege of Moscow.
1618	Thirty Years' War	Siege of Pilsen	(Czech Republic)	19 Sep—21 Nov	The first major battle of the war. The Protestant victory under Mansfeld and the subsequent capture of the city enlarged the Bohemian Revolt.
1618		Battle of Orynin	(Ukraine)	28 Sep	Polish forces face Crimean Tatars from Budjak near Orynin in Podolia.
1618	Polish–Russian War and Polish–Muscovite War	Siege of Moscow	(Russia)	2–11 Oct	Władysław's last major military action of the war. Russians forced to cede some of its land in the Truce of Deulino.
1618	Thirty Years' War	Battle of Lomnice	(Czech Republic)	9 Nov	The Protestant army of the Bohemian Estates under Count Thurn defeats the Roman Catholic army of the Habsburg monarchy under Count Bucquoy.
1619	Manchu conquest of China	Battle of Sarhū	(China)	14–18 April	The Manchus defeat the Ming.
1619		Siege of Batavia Castle	(Indonesia)	30 May	Coen sieges Jakarta with the intent of moving the base of the Dutch East India Company to Java from Bantam. The Mataram, under whose influence Jakarta fell, was opposed to this and resisted strongly.
1619	Thirty Years' War	Battle of Sablat	(Czech Republic)	10 June	The Habsburg army under Bucquoy defeats the Protestant Bohemian army under Mansfeld, thereby lifting the siege of České Budějovice.
1619	Thirty Years' War	Battle of Wisternitz	(Czech Republic)	5 Aug	Bohemia defeats a Habsburg army.
1619	Thirty Years' War	Battle of Humenné	(Slovakia)	22–23 Nov	Poland defeats a pro-Bohemia Transylvanian army in the Commonwealth's only battle of the war.
1620	War of Mother and Son	Battle of Les Ponts-de-Cé	(France)	7 Aug	King Louis XIII of France defeats Marillac, commander of the army of Marie de' Medici.
1620	Spanish–Ottoman Wars and Ottoman–Habsburg wars	Sack of Manfredonia	(Italy)	16-18 Aug	Ottoman victory ,Manfredonia sacked .
1620	Moldavian Magnate Wars and Polish–Ottoman War	Battle of Cecora	(Romania)	17 Sep—7 Oct	Ottoman Turks assisted by Crimean Tatars defeat the Polish army in Moldavia. Also known as the Battle of Țuțora.
1620	Thirty Years' War	Battle of White Mountain	(Czech Republic)	8 Nov	The Catholic League and the Habsburg Imperial Army defeat a Bohemian-Palatinate force, deciding the fate of Prague and ending the rule of "Winter King" Frederick in Bohemia.
1620	Polish-Ottoman War and Cossack raids	Cossack raid on Istanbul	(Turkey)		A campaign of the Zaporozhian Cossacks to the capital of the Ottoman Empire.

== 1621–1640 ==
Year	War	Battle	Loc.	Date(s)	Description
1621	Huguenot rebellions	Siege of Saint-Jean-d'Angély	(France)	30 May—24 June	Troops under Louis XIII siege the Protestant stronghold of Saint-Jean-d'Angély
1621	Huguenot rebellions	Siege of Clairac	(France)	23 July—4 Aug	French troops subdue Guyenne and besiege the Protestant bastion Clairac.
1621	Eighty Years' War	Battle of Gibraltar	(Gibraltar)	10 Aug	A Dutch East India Company fleet, escorted by Haultain's squadron is intercepted and defeated by nine Spanish ships while crossing the Strait of Gibraltar.
1621	Polish–Swedish War	Siege of Riga	(Latvia)	Aug—Sep	Swedish Empire captures Riga from the Polish-Lithuanian Commonwealth.
1621	Huguenot rebellions	Siege of Montauban	(France)	Aug—Nov	Troops under Louis XIII siege the Protestant stronghold of Montauban but are unable to capture the city despite being 25,000 men strong.
1621	Moldavian Magnate Wars and Polish–Ottoman War	Battle of Khotyn	(Ukraine)	2 Sep—9 Oct	Polish–Lithuanian Commonwealth army stops great Turkish invasion.
1621	Eighty Years' War	Siege of Jülich	(Germany)	5 Sep 1621 – 3 Feb 1622	After five months of siege, the Spanish army takes the Dutch-occupied fortress of Jülich, compelling its garrison to surrender.
1621	Huguenot rebellions	Blockade of La Rochelle	(France)	1621—1622	Louis XIII represses the Huguenot rebellion.
1621	Early Mughal-Sikh Wars	Battle of Rohilla	(India)		Sikh victory over the Mughal Empire.
1622	Portuguese–Safavid War (1621–1630) and Anglo-Portuguese rivalry in the Persian Gulf	Anglo-Persian capture of Qeshm	(Iran)	June 1621-1 Feb 1602	Safavid Iran and the British East India Company lead a joint attack that drives Portugal out of Qeshm Island.
1622	Safavid–Portuguese conflicts	Anglo-Persian capture of Ormuz	(Iran)	9 Feb—4 May	Persians capture Hormuz Island with the aid of the English East India Company's ships.
1622	British colonization of the Americas and Anglo-Powhatan Wars	Indian massacre of 1622	(United States)	1 April	Powhatan kills 347 people in the Colony of Virginia.
1622	Thirty Years' War	Battle of Wiesloch	(Germany)	25 April	The Protestant Palatinate army under Mansfield defeats the Catholic League army under Tilly.
1622	Thirty Years' War	Battle of Wimpfen	(Germany)	6 May	Catholic League forces under Tilly and of Spain under Córdoba defeat Baden and Palatinate Protestant forces under Frederick.
1622	Huguenot rebellions	Siege of Royan	(France)	May	French forces under Louis XIII siege a Protestant stronghold.
1622	Huguenot rebellions	Siege of Nègrepelisse	(France)	10–11 June	French forces under Louis XIII siege a Protestant stronghold.
1622	Thirty Years' War	Battle of Höchst	(Germany)	20 June	The joint Spanish-League army under Cordoba and Tilly attempt to stop the junction of Christian of Brunswick and Mansfeld and are able to intercept Christian before he can cross the River Main at Höchst.
1622	Dutch–Portuguese War and Eighty Years War	Battle of Macau	(China)	22–24 June	Portuguese repel attack on Macau by the Dutch.
1622	Eighty Years' War	Siege of Bergen-op-Zoom	(Netherlands)	18 July—2 Oct	The Spanish siege the city of Bergen-op-Zoom, whose population is split between Protestants and Catholics.
1622	Thirty Years' War	Siege of Heidelberg	(Germany)	23 July—19 Sep	Between the Imperial Spanish army against the Anglo-Protestant forces during the Palatinate campaign.
1622	Thirty Years' War	Battle of Fleurus	(Belgium)	29 Aug	Spanish tactical victory against the Protestant army of Mansfeld and Christian of Brunswick but Spain is nevertheless forced to lift the siege on Bergen-op-Zoom.
1622	Huguenot rebellions	Siege of Montpellier	(France)	Aug—Oct	French Catholic forces siege Huguenot Montpellier.
1622	Huguenot rebellions	Naval battle of Saint-Martin-de-Ré	(France)	27 Oct	Inconclusive conflict between a Huguenot fleet under Guiton and a Royal fleet under Guise.
1622	First Kongo-Portuguese War	Battle of Mbumbi	(Angola)	18 Dec	Portuguese victory over the Kongolese.
1623	First Kongo-Portuguese War	Battle of Mbanda Kasi	(Angola)	Jan	Kongolese victory over the Portuguese.
1623	Dutch–Portuguese War	Portuguese Conquest of Maricay	(Brazil)	23 May	The Portuguese expel the Dutch and English from the Cabo Norte region.
1623	Thirty Years' War	Battle of Stadtlohn	(Germany)	6 Aug	Tilly leads Catholic forces to victory over the Protestants.
1623		Battle of Anjar	(Lebanon)	1 Nov	The Emirate of Mount Lebanon and the Grand Duchy of Tuscany defeat the Ottoman Empire.
1623	Dutch–Portuguese War	Capture of Bahia	(Brazil)	22 Dec	Dutch victory.
1624	Ottoman–Safavid War	Capture of Baghdad	(Iraq)	14 Jan	Persians attack and capture Baghdad.
1624	Dutch–Portuguese War	Capture of Salvador	(Brazil)	8 May	Dutch capture Salvador from Portugal.
1624	Tatar raids and Russo-Crimean Wars	Battle of Martynów	(Ukraine)	20 June	Polish-Lithuanian victory over Crimean Tatars.
1624	Cossack raids	Cossack raids on Istanbul	(Turkey)	9 July—20 Aug	Cossacks raid the capital of the Ottoman Empire.
1624	Abaza rebellion	First Abaza rebellion	(Turkey)	16 Aug	Abaza Mehmed Pasha's forces defeated and he escaped to Erzurum where he continued to govern.
1624	Eighty Years' War	Siege of Breda	(Netherlands)	28 Aug 1624 – 5 June 1625	Dutch fortress falls into Spanish hands.
1624	Sino-Dutch conflicts	Battle of Penghu	(Taiwan)	Aug	China captures Fengguiwei Fort from the Netherlands and liberates Penghu.
1624	Spanish–Ottoman wars	Action of 3 October 1624	(Italy)	3 Oct	Spanish-Tuscan-Papal victory over Algerian pirates.
1624	Eighty Years' War	Third Battle of Playa Honda	(Philippines)		Spain defeats the Netherlands.
1625	Huguenot rebellions	Battle of Blavet	(France)	17 Jan	Conflict between Huguenot forces and a French fleet in Blavet harbour trigger the Second Huguenot rebellion against the Crown of France.
1625	Dutch–Portuguese War	Battle off Hormuz	(Iran)	11–12 Feb	Inconclusive naval battle between Portugal and the Dutch and British East India Companies regardless resulting in loss of Portuguese influence in the region.
1625	Kartli-Kakhetian Uprising	Battle of Aghaiani	(Georgia (country))	Early spring	Kakhetian noblemen invited to Qarachaqay's camp are slaughtered.
1625	Georgian-Safavid wars	Battle of Martqopi	(Georgia (country))	25 March	Georgians under Saakadze annihilate the invading Safavid force, allowing for the liberation of Tbilisi and the unification of the Kingdoms of Kartli and Kakheti.
1625	Thirty Years' War	Relief of Genoa	(Italy)	28 March—24 April	A Spanish-Genoese army relieve the city from a Franco-Savoyard army.
1625	Dutch–Portuguese War	Recapture of Bahia	(Brazil)	1 May—1 April	Decisive Spanish–Portuguese victory.
1625	Kartli-Kakhetian Uprising	Battle of Marabda	(Georgia (country))	1 July	Safavid victory over the kingdoms of Kartli and Kakheti, but Iranians endure heavy casualties in the ensuing guerrilla war.
1625	Dutch–Portuguese War	Battle of Elmina	(Ghana)	25 Oct	Failed Dutch attempt to take a Portuguese fortress.
1625	Zhmaylo uprising	Battle of Kurukov Lake	(Ukraine)	31 Oct	A battle between the Polish-Lithuanian Commonwealth and Cossacks ends with the signing of the Treaty of Kurukove.
1625	Huguenot rebellions	Recovery of Ré Island	(France)	12–15 Sep	French troops recover Island of Ré from Protestant troops and Huguenot forces of La Rochelle, who had been occupying the Island of Ré since February 1625.
1625	Eighty Years' War	Battle of San Juan	(Puerto Rico)	24 Sep—2 Nov	Dutch expedition attacks Puerto Rico, but, despite besieging San Juan for two months, is unable to capture it from Spain.
1625	Polish–Swedish War	Battle of Bauska	(Latvia)	27 Sep	
1625	Ottoman–Safavid War	Siege of Baghdad	(Iraq)	Nov 1625 – 4 July 1626	Safavid Persia is successfully defended against an Ottoman attack.
1625	Anglo-Spanish War and Thirty Years' War	Cádiz expedition	(Spain)	1–7 Nov	Naval expedition against Spain by English and Dutch forces.
1626	Polish–Swedish War	Battle of Wallhof	(Latvia)	7 Jan	King Gustavus defeats a Polish force.
1626	Transition from Ming to Qing	Battle of Ningyuan	(China)	2–10 Feb	A battle between the Ming dynasty and the Jurchen Later Jin (later known as the Qing dynasty). Ming victory.
1626	Thirty Years' War	Battle of Dessau Bridge	(Germany)	25 April	Roman Catholic forces under Wallenstein defeat Protestant Danish-German troops under Mansfeld on the Elbe River.
1626	Thirty Years' War	Upper Austrian peasant war of 1626	(Germany)	May—Dec	
1626		Battle at Lenz		5 July	Rebel Austrian Boers defeated.
1626	Anglo-Spanish War and Thirty Years' War	Siege of Oldenzaal	(Netherlands)	23 July—1 Aug	After an eight-day siege, the Spanish surrender Oldenzaal to Dutch-English forces.
1626	Thirty Years' War	Battle of Lutter am Berenberge	(Germany)	27 Aug	The Danish army under King Christian IV is defeated by the German Catholic League under Tilly.
1626	Polish–Swedish War	Battle of Gniew	(Poland)	22 Sep—1 Oct	Swedish victory over the Polish–Lithuanian Commonwealth.
1626	Polish–Swedish War	Battle of Selburg	(Latvia)	30 Sep	Swedish recapture Selburg from the Polish–Lithuanian Commonwealth.
1626	Kartli-Kakhetian Uprising	Battle of Bazaleti	(Georgia (country))	Autumn	Teimuraz I defeats Kakhetian rival Saakadze, forcing him to flee to the Ottoman Empire.
1626	Polish–Swedish War	Battle of Wenden	(Latvia)	3 Dec	Swedish victory over the Polish-Lithuanian Commonwealth.
1626	Eighty Years' War	Siege of Steenwijk	(Netherlands)		
1626	Polish–Swedish War	Battle of Mitau	(Latvia)		
1627	Polish–Swedish War	Battle of Czarne	(Poland)	12–17 April	The Swedish surrender, mainly due to low morale of the German mercenaries in Swedish service.
1627	Transition from Ming to Qing	Battle of Ning-Jin	(China)	Spring	Ming defeat the Jurchen Later Jin.
1627	Anglo-French War	Siege of Saint-Martin-de-Ré	(France)	12 July—27 Oct	English forces attempt to capture the French fortress-city of Saint-Martin-de-Ré, but fail.
1627	Eighty Years' War and Anglo–Spanish War	Siege of Groenlo	(Netherlands)	20 July—19 Aug	A Dutch army led by Frederick Henry, Prince of Orange liberates the city from Spanish rule.
1627	Polish–Swedish War	Battle of Dirschau	(Poland)	7–8 Aug	Indecisive battle.
1627	Ottoman–Safavid War (1623–1639) & Abaza rebellion	Second Abaza rebellion	(Georgia (country))	Aug	The Persians were threatening the city of Akhaltsikhe , Abaza who was supposed to support the ottomans raided the Ottoman army instead killing many janissaries and Ottoman pashas.
1627	Huguenot rebellions and Anglo-French War	Siege of La Rochelle	(France)	Sep 1627 – Oct 1628	The apex of the tensions between the Catholics and the Protestants in France ends with a complete 'victory' for King Louis XIII and the Catholics over the Huguenots of La Rochelle.
1627	Polish–Swedish War	Battle of Oliwa	(Poland)	28 Nov	Biggest and final naval battle of the Polish royal navy.
1628	Polish–Swedish War	Battle of Treiden	(Latvia)	1 Feb	Polish forces defeat the Swedish.
1628	War of the Mantuan Succession	Siege of Casale Monferrato	(Italy)	29 March 1628 – 16 March 1629	France captures Casale Monferrato for the Spanish Charles I Gonzaga, fighting for Ferrante II Gonzaga.
1628	Early Mughal-Sikh Wars	Battle of Amritsar	(India)	14 April	Tensions increase between the Mughal government and Guru Hargobind Sikhs. The battle results in a Sikh victory. Occurred 1628 or 1634.
1628	Thirty Years' War	Siege of Stralsund	(Germany)	May—4 August	Imperial Army invades Stralsund, which was aided by Denmark, Sweden and Scotland. The battle marked the de facto entrance of Sweden into the war.
1628	Polish–Swedish War	Battle of Danzig	(Poland)	16 June	
1628	Polish–Swedish War	Battle of Latarnia	(Poland)	6 July	King Gustavus's field army launches a surprise attack on the Polish and Danzig fleets hiding in the Weichselmünde harbour. Also called the Battle of Weichselmünde.
1628	Anglo-French War and Beaver Wars	Action of 17 July 1628	(Canada)	17 July	In the largest incident of the North American phase of the Beaver Wars, English forces successfully captures a supply convoy bound for New France, severely impairing that colony's ability to resist attack.
1628	Dutch–Mataram conflicts	Siege of Batavia	(Indonesia)	22 Aug—3 Dec	A military campaign led by Sultan Agung of Mataram fails to capture the Dutch port-settlement of Batavia in Java.
1628	Thirty Years' War	Battle of Wolgast	(Germany)	2 Sep	Danish forces make landfall on Usedom to expel the Imperial occupation forces. The Imperial army leave the besieged Stralsund to confront and defeat the Danes.
1628	Eighty Years' War	Battle in the Bay of Matanzas	(Cuba)	7–8 Sep	Dutch fleet led by Admiral Hein defeats and captures the Spanish treasure fleet.
1628	Abaza rebellion	siege of Erzurum	(Turkey)	18 Sep	Gazi Hüsrev Pasha laid siege on Erzurum with canons at his disposale, Abaza decided to give up thus ending the rebellion.
1628	Polish–Swedish War	Battle of Ostróda	(Poland)	23 Oct	Polish victory over the Swedish.
1629	Polish–Swedish War	Battle of Górzno	(Poland)	12 Feb	Swedish victory.
1629	Eighty Years' War and Anglo–Spanish War	Siege of 's-Hertogenbosch	(Netherlands)	13 April—14 Sep	Dutch army takes a city loyal to the Spanish king.
1629	Huguenot rebellions	Siege of Privas	(France)	14–28 May	Louis XIII captures Privas in one of the last events of the Huguenot rebellions.
1629	Dutch–Mataram conflicts	Second Siege of Batavia	(Indonesia)	May—21 Sep	Another unsuccessful attempt by Sultan Agung of Mataram to capture the Dutch port-settlement of Batavia in Java.
1629	Huguenot rebellions	Siege of Alès	(France)	9–17 June	Louis XIII captures Alès.
1629	Anglo-Spanish War	Battle of St. Kitts	(Saint Kitts and Nevis)	17 June—7 Sep	Spanish seize the islands of Saint Kitts and Nevis from the English and French.
1629	Polish–Swedish War	Battle of Trzciana	(Poland)	25 June	Polish victory.
1629	Acehnese–Portuguese conflicts	Battle of Duyon River	(Malaysia)	June—Dec	Portuguese naval victory over the Sultanate of Aceh.
1630	Arauco War	Battle of Piculhue	(Chile)	24 Jan	Indecisive battle between Spain and the Mapuche people.
1630	Dutch invasions of Brazil and Dutch–Portuguese War	Siege of Recife	(Brazil)	14 Feb—3 March	The Dutch capture Recife in Portuguese Brazil, which starts a war over Brazil. Dutch later establish a colony called New Holland.
1630	Thirty Years' War and War of the Mantuan Succession	Battle of Villabuona	(Italy)	29 May	The Holy Roman Empire defeats Venice and France.
1630	War of the Mantuan Succession	Battle of Veillane	(Italy)	10 July	French victory over a Spanish army.
1630	Sinhalese–Portuguese War	Battle of Randeniwela	(Sri Lanka)	25 Aug	Sinhalese victory over Portuguese.
1630	Ottoman–Safavid War (1623–1639)	Siege of Baghdad	(Iraq)	6 Oct-14 Nov	Safavids repel Ottoman attempt to recapture Baghdad.
1631	Arauco War	Battle of La Albarrada	(Chile)	13 Jan	Spain defeats the Mapuche people.
1631	Thirty Years' War	Battle of Frankfurt an der Oder	(Germany)	13 April	Swedish victory over the Holy Roman Empire for the strategically important, fortified Oder crossing Frankfurt an der Oder.
1631	Thirty Years' War	Battle of Magdeburg	(Germany)	20–24 May	The Imperial-League army under Tilly capture and pillage the town.
1631		Sack of Baltimore	(Republic of Ireland)	20 June	The only recorded instance of a slaving raid by corsairs in Ireland.
1631	Thirty Years' War	Battle of Werben	(Germany)	1 Aug	Swedish force Imperial troops to retreat.
1631	Dutch invasions of Brazil and Dutch–Portuguese War	Battle of Albrolhos	(Brazil)	10 Aug	Spanish Oquendo defeats the Dutch after a six-hour naval battle.
1631	Eighty Years' War	Battle of the Slaak	(Netherlands)	12–13 Sep	Crushing Dutch victory over a Spanish fleet.
1631	Thirty Years' War	Battle of Breitenfeld	(Germany)	17 Sep	Saxons and Swedes defeat the Imperial-League army under Tilly.
1631	Early Mughal-Sikh Wars	Battle of Lahira	(India)	15 Oct	Sikh victory over the Mughal Empire. Occurred 1631 or 1634.
1631	Ming-Qing transition	Battle of Dalinghe	(China)	September-November	Jurchen Later Jin defeat Ming dynasty.
1632	Thirty Years' War	Battle of Rain	(Germany)	5 April	Tilly is killed in battle with the Swedes.
1632	Eighty Years' War	Capture of Maastricht	(Netherlands)	9 June—22 Aug	Frederick Henry, Prince of Orange eventually captures Maastricht from Spanish forces.
1632	Thirty Years' War	Siege of Nuremberg	(Germany)	17 July—18 Sep	Sweden is defeated by the Holy Roman Empire under Wallenstein, leading to the Imperial advance into Saxony.
1632	Thirty Years' War	Battle of Wiesloch	(Germany)	16 Aug	Swedish victory over the Holy Roman Empire near Wiesloch.
1632		Battle of Castelnaudary	(France)	1 Sep	Montmorency's rebel forces, loyal to Orléans, are defeated by Schomberg's royalist forces of Marshal.
1632	Thirty Years' War	Battle of the Alte Veste	(Germany)	3–4 Sep	
1632	Smolensk War	Siege of Smolensk	(Poland)	28 Oct 1632 – 4 Oct 1633	The Muscovite army besieges the Polish–Lithuanian city of Smolensk.
1632	Thirty Years' War	Battle of Lützen	(Germany)	16 Nov	Protestant Swedish forces defeat the Imperial army under Wallenstein in Saxony but King Gustavus is killed.
1633	Omani–Portuguese conflicts	Capture of Julfar	(United Arab Emirates)	Early 1633	Omani capture of Persian/Portuguese forts.
1633	Eighty Years' War	Siege of Rheinberg	(Germany)	11 June—2 July	The Dutch capture Rheinberg from Spain.
1633	Sino–Dutch conflicts	Battle of Liaoluo Bay	(Taiwan)	7 July—22 Oct	The Dutch East India Company are decisively defeated by Ming China.
1633	Thirty Years' War	Battle of Oldendorf	(Germany)	8 July	The Swedish Empire and Hesse-Kassel defeat the Holy Roman Empire near Hessisch Oldendorf.
1634	Early Mughal-Sikh Wars	Battle of Amritsar	(India)	14 April	Tensions increase between the Mughal government and Guru Hargobind Sikhs. The battle results in a Sikh victory. Occurred 1628 or 1634.
1634	Eighty Years' War	Siege of Maastricht	(Netherlands)	30 June—8 Sep	Spain fails to capture Maastricht from the Netherlands.
1634	Thirty Years' War	Battle of Nördlingen	(Germany)	6–7 Sep	The Imperial and Spanish armies number 33,000 troops, while the Protestant forces have 25,000. At the end of the day, 12,000 Protestants are dead and another 4,000 captured, including Gustaf Horn.
1634	Thirty Years' War	Battle of Strasbourg Bridge	(Germany)	28 Sep	Forces of the Holy Roman Empire under Charles of Lorraine and Werth defeat Sweden.
1634	Early Mughal-Sikh Wars	Battle of Lahira	(India)	15 Oct	Sikh victory over the Mughal Empire. Occurred 1631 or 1634.
1635	Early Mughal-Sikh Wars	Battle of Kartarpur	(India)	25 April	Sikh victory over the Mughal Empire.
1635	Early Mughal-Sikh Wars	Battle of Phagwara	(India)	29 April	Sikh victory over the Mughal Empire.
1635	Franco-Spanish War	Battle of Les Avins	(Belgium)	20 May	France defeats Spain.
1635	Eighty Years' War, Thirty Years' War and Franco-Spanish War	Siege of Leuven	(Belgium)	24 June—4 July	France and the Netherlands fail to capture Leuven from Spain.
1635	Ottoman–Safavid War	Siege of Yerevan	(Armenia)	26 July—8 Aug	Ottomans capture Yerevan.
1635	Eighty Years' War and Franco-Spanish War	Siege of Schenkenschans	(Germany)	30 July 1635 – 30 April 1636	Dutch capture Schenkenschanz from Spain.
1635	Sino-Dutch conflicts	Battle of Madou	(Taiwan)	23 Nov	The Netherlands defeats the Madou tribe of the Siraya people.
1635	Sino-Dutch conflicts	Battle on Christmas Day	(Taiwan)	26 Dec	The Netherlands defeats the Makatao people.
1636	Franco-Spanish War	Battle of Tornavento	(Italy)	22 June	Stalemate between a Franco-Savoyard army and a Spanish army.
1636	Thirty Years' War	Battle of Wittstock	(Germany)	4 Oct	Sweden defeats a Saxon-Imperial army.
1636	Korean–Jurchen conflicts and Transition from Ming to Qing	Qing invasion of Joseon	(North Korea)	9 Dec 1636 – 30 Jan 1637	Qing invasion of Joseon.
1636	Ahom–Mughal wars	Battle of Sualkuchi	(India)		Ahom Kingdom victory over the Mughal Empire.
1637	Eighty Years' War	Battle off Lizard Point	(England)	18 Feb	Spanish fleet defeats an Anglo-Dutch merchant convoy off Lizard Point, Cornwall.
1637	Eighty Years' War and Thirty Years' War; Franco-Spanish War	Siege of Breda	(Netherlands)	21 July—11 Oct	Frederick Henry, Prince of Orange retakes the city.
1637	Dutch–Portuguese War	Battle of Elmina	(Ghana)	24–29 Aug	The Dutch capture Fort Elmina from the Portuguese.
1637	Thirty Years' War and Franco-Spanish War	Siege of Leucate	(France)	27 Aug—29 Sep	Failed Spanish siege on Leucate.
1637	Eighty Years' War	Siege of Roermond	(Netherlands)	31 Aug—1 Sep	Spain captures Roermond from the Netherlands.
1637	Franco-Spanish War	Battle of Mombaldone	(Italy)	8 Sep	Victor Amadeus I, Duke of Savoy defeats a Spanish army.
1637	Pavlyuk uprising	Battle of Kumeyki	(Ukraine)	16 Dec	
1638	Sinhalese–Portuguese War	Battle of Gannoruwa	(Sri Lanka)	28 March	Sri Lanka defeats Portugal.
1638	Dutch invasions of Brazil and Dutch–Portuguese War	Siege of Salvador	(Brazil)	April—May	The Netherlands fails to capture Salvador from Portugal and Spain.
1638	Thirty Years' War and Franco-Spanish War	Siege of Fuenterrabía	(Spain)	June—7 Sep	France fails to capture Fuenterrabia from Spain.
1638	Ostryanyn Uprising	Battle of Zhovnyn	(Ukraine)	13 June—7 Aug	Poland defeats rebel Cossacks.
1638	Eighty Years' War	Battle of Kallo	(Belgium)	20 June	William of Nassau-Siegen tries to surround the city of Antwerp but is defeated by a Spanish army.
1638	Thirty Years' War	Battle of Breisach	(Germany)	18 Aug—17 Dec	France and the German Protestant army of Saxe-Weimar capture Breisach from Habsburg Austria.
1638	Franco-Spanish War	Battle of Getaria	(Spain)	22 Aug	The French navy defeats Spain.
1638	Thirty Years' War	Battle of Vlotho	(Germany)	17 Oct	An Imperial army under Hatzfeldt defeats the Palatinate, England and Sweden.
1638	Ottoman–Safavid War	Capture of Baghdad	(Iraq)	15 Nov—25 Dec	Ottomans retake Baghdad from the Safavids.
1638	Dutch–Portuguese War	Battle of Goa	(India)	1638—1639	Portugal defeats a Dutch fleet.
1639	Eighty Years' War	Action of 18 February 1639	(France)	18 Feb	The Netherlands defeat Spain in a naval battle near Dunkirk.
1639	Thirty Years' War	Battle of Chemnitz	(Germany)	14 April	Sweden under Banér defeats the Holy Roman Empire and Saxony led by Marazzino
1639	Thirty Years' War and Franco-Spanish War	Relief of Thionville	(France)	7 June	Imperial and Spanish forces under Piccolomini defeat the French siege army of the Marquis de Feuquieres and lift the siege of Thionville.
1639	First Bishops' War	Battle of the Brig of Dee	(Scotland)	18–19 June	Covenanters defeat the Royalists in a civil war in Scotland.
1639	Dutch–Portuguese War	Action of 30 September 1639	(India)	30 Sep	Dutch ships capture and destroy three Portuguese galleons.
1639	Eighty Years' War and Thirty Years' War	Battle of the Downs	(England)	21 Oct	Spanish navy is defeated by the Dutch in the English Channel.
1640	Dutch invasions of Brazil and Dutch–Portuguese War	Action of 12–17 January 1640	(Brazil)	12–17 Jan	Inconclusive naval battle.
1640	Sinhalese–Portuguese War	Siege of Galle	(Sri Lanka)	8–13 March	The Netherlands and the Kingdom of Kandy conquer Galle from Portugal.
1640	Piedmontese Civil War	Siege of Turin	(Italy)	22 May—20 Sep	Turin is captured by France and the Madamisti faction from Spain and the Principisti faction from Savoy.
1640	Eighty Years' War	Battle of Hulst	(Netherlands)	4 July	Spain defeats The Netherlands.
1640	Franco-Spanish War	Battle of Cádiz	(Spain)	21 July	France defeats a Spanish fleet.
1640	Dutch–Portuguese War	Battle of Malacca	(Malaysia)	2 Aug 1640 – 14 Jan 1641	Dutch efforts effectively destroy the last bastion of Portuguese power.
1640	Second Bishops' War	Battle of Newburn	(England)	28 Aug	Covenanters from Scotland defeat a royalist English army.
1640	Reapers' War	Battle of Cambrils	(Spain)	13–16 Dec	Spain defeats rebels from Catalonia, followed by a massacre.

== 1641–1660 ==
Year	War	Battle	Loc.	Date(s)	Description
1641	Reapers' War and Franco-Spanish War	Battle of Martorell	(Spain)	20–23 Jan	Spain defeats Catalonia.
1641	Reapers' War and Franco-Spanish War	Battle of Montjuïc	(Spain)	26 Jan	Catalonia and France defeat Spain.
1641	Portuguese Restoration War	Battle of Mbororé	(Argentina)	11 March	Guaraní people and Spanish Jesuits defeat Portuguese Bandeirantes and the Tupi people.
1641	Portuguese Restoration War	Siege of São Filipe	(Portugal)	27 March 1641 – 4 March 1642	Portugal captures the Fort of São Filipe from Spain.
1641	Franco-Spanish War	Sieges of Aire-sur-la-Lys	(France)	19 May—7 Dec	France captures Aire-sur-la-Lys on 27 July. A Spanish army besieges the village from 10 August and recaptures it on 7 December.
1641	Reapers' War and Franco-Spanish War	Naval battle of Tarragona	(Spain)	4–6 July	France defeats Spain.
1641	Reapers' War and Franco-Spanish War	Battle of Tarragona	(Spain)	20–25 Aug	The Spanish Navy defeats France.
1641		Capture of Luanda	(Angola)	25 Aug	The Dutch capture Luanda from the Portuguese.
1641	Eighty Years' War	Battle of San Salvador	(Taiwan)	Aug	
1641	Eighty Years' War	Battle of Cape St. Vincent	(Portugal)	4 Nov	Spain defeats a Dutch fleet.
1641	Reapers' War and Franco-Spanish War	Siege of Perpignan	(France)	4 Nov 1641 – 9 Sep 1642	France and Catalonia capture Perpignan from Spain.
1642	Reapers' War and Franco-Spanish War	Battle of Montmeló	(Spain)	28 March	France and Catalonia defeat Spain.
1642	Ming-Qing transition	Battle of Song-Jin	(China)		Qing dynasty decisively defeats Ming and take Jinzhou.
1642	Irish Confederate Wars	Battle of Kilrush	(Republic of Ireland)	15 April	The Royalists defeat Confederate Ireland.
1642	Franco-Spanish War and Thirty Years' War	Battle of Honnecourt	(France)	26 May	Spanish victory against a French army.
1642	Franco-Spanish War	Battle of Barcelona	(Spain)	29 June—3 July	The French navy defeats Spain.
1642	Eighty Years' War	Battle of San Salvador	(Taiwan)	19–26 Aug	The Netherlands capture Keelung, San Salvador from Spain.
1642	Irish Confederate Wars	Battle of Liscarroll	(Republic of Ireland)	3 Sep	England defeats Ireland.
1642	First English Civil War	Battle of Babylon Hill	(England)	7 Sep	Royalist and Parliamentarian fight near Yeovil ends in a draw.
1642	First English Civil War	Battle of Powick Bridge	(England)	21 Sep	Royalists defeat the Parliamentarians.
1642	Reapers' War and Franco-Spanish War	Battle of Lleida	(Spain)	7 Oct	France and Catalonia defeat Spain.
1642	First English Civil War	Battle of Kings Norton	(England)	17 Oct	Parliamentarians defeat the Royalists.
1642	First English Civil War	Battle of Edgehill	(England)	23 Oct	Officially the first battle of English Civil War; a draw.
1642	Thirty Years' War	Second Battle of Breitenfeld	(Germany)	23 Oct	Swedish victory over Holy Roman Empire.
1642	First English Civil War	Battle of Aylesbury	(England)	1 Nov	Parliamentarians defeat the Royalists.
1642	First English Civil War	Battle of Brentford	(England)	12 Nov	Royalist cavalry defeats Parliamentarians but has to retreat later.
1642	First English Civil War	Battle of Turnham Green	(England)	13 Nov	Strategic victory of the Parliamentarians over the Royalists.
1642	First English Civil War	Battle of Tadcaster	(England)	7 Dec	Royalists defeat the Parliamentarians.
1643	First English Civil War	Battle of Braddock Down	(England)	19 Jan	Royalists defeat the Parliamentarians.
1643	First English Civil War	Battle of Leeds	(England)	23 Jan	Parliamentarians defeat the Royalists.
1643	First English Civil War	First Battle of Middlewich	(England)	13 March	Parliamentarians defeat the Royalists.
1643	First English Civil War	Battle of Hopton Heath	(England)	19 March	Inconclusive battle between the Royalists and the Parliamentarians.
1643	First English Civil War	Battle of Seacroft Moor	(England)	30 March	Royalists defeat the Parliamentarians.
1643	First English Civil War	Battle of Camp Hill	(England)	3 April	Royalists defeat the Parliamentarians.
1643	First English Civil War	Battle of Ripple Field	(England)	13 April	Royalists defeat the Parliamentarians.
1643	First English Civil War	Battle of Sourton Down	(England)	25 April	Parliamentarians defeat the Royalists.
1643	First English Civil War	Battle of Stratton	(England)	16 May	Royalists destroy Parliamentarians' field army in Devon and Cornwall.
1643	Thirty Years' War and Franco-Spanish War	Battle of Rocroi	(France)	19 May	French under Duc d'Enghien destroy Spanish military supremacy in Europe.
1643	Irish Confederate Wars	Battle of Clones	(Republic of Ireland)	13 June	Royalists defeat the Irish Confederation.
1643	First English Civil War	Battle of Chalgrove Field	(England)	18 June	Royalists defeat the Parliamentarians.
1643	First English Civil War	Battle of Adwalton Moor	(England)	30 June	Royalists defeat the Parliamentarians.
1643	First English Civil War	Battle of Burton Bridge	(England)	4 July	Royalists capture Burton from the Parliamentarians.
1643	First English Civil War	Battle of Lansdowne	(England)	5 July	Royalists and Parliamentarians tie near Bath.
1643	First English Civil War	Battle of Roundway Down	(England)	13 July	Royalists crush Parliamentarians in West Country.
1643	First English Civil War	Battle of Gainsborough	(England)	28 July	Parliamentarians defeat the Royalists.
1643	Irish Confederate Wars	Battle of Portlester	(Republic of Ireland)	7 Aug	The Irish Confederation defeat the Royalists.
1643	Franco-Spanish War	Battle of Cartagena	(Spain)	3 Sep	The French Navy defeats Spain.
1643	First English Civil War	Battle of Aldbourne Chase	(England)	18 Sep	Inconclusive battle between the Royalists and the Parliamentarians.
1643	First English Civil War	First Battle of Newbury	(England)	20 Sep	Parliamentarians stop Royalists from taking London.
1643	First English Civil War	Battle of Winceby	(England)	11 Oct	Parliamentarians defeat the Royalists.
1643	Thirty Years' War and Franco-Spanish War	Battle of Tuttlingen	(Germany)	24 Nov	An Imperial-Bavarian army under Mercy defeats a French army under Rantzau, shattering their force and compelling them to retreat over the Rhine.
1643	First English Civil War	Battle of Alton	(England)	13 Dec	Parliamentarians defeat the Royalists.
1644	Torstenson War	Battle of Kolding	(Denmark)	9 Jan	Sweden defeats Denmark–Norway.
1644	First English Civil War	Battle of Nantwich	(England)	25 Jan	Parliamentarians defeat the Royalists.
1644	Vlach uprisings in Moravia/Thirty Years' War	Battle of Vsetín	(Czech Republic)	26 Jan	The Holy Roman Empire defeats Moravian Vlachs, Sweden and Transylvania.
1644	Tatar raids on the Commonwealth	Battle of Ochmatów	(Ukraine)	30 Jan	Polish–Lithuanian army defeats Crimean Tatars.
1644	Wars of Castro	Battle of Lagoscuro	(Italy)	17 March	Allied Castrese-Venetian-Modenese-Tuscan forces defeat the Papal army.
1644	First English Civil War	Battle of Boldon Hill	(England)	24 March	Indecisive battle between the Royalists and the Scottish Covenanters.
1644	First English Civil War	Battle of Cheriton	(England)	29 March	Parliamentarians defeat the Royalists.
1644	First English Civil War	Battle of Selby	(England)	11 April	Parliamentarians defeat the Royalists.
1644	Reapers' War and Franco-Spanish War	Battle of Lleida	(Spain)	5 May	Spain defeats France.
1644	Reapers' War and Franco-Spanish War	Siege of Lleida	(Spain)	13 May—30 July	Spain captures Lleida from Catalonia. Catalonia was aided by France.
1644	Portuguese Restoration War	Battle of Montijo	(Spain)	26 May	Indecisive battle between Portugal and Spain.
1644	Ming-Qing transition	Battle of Shanhai Pass	(China)	27 May	Qing dynasty takes Beijing.
1644	First English Civil War	Battle of Tipton Green	(England)	12 June	Inconclusive battle between the Royalists and the Parliamentarians.
1644	Conflict between Willem Leyel and Bernt Pessart	Willem Leyel's siege of Dansborg	(India)	22 June	Civil war in Danish India. Willem Leyel, Portugal, the Thanjavur Nayak kingdom and Tharangambadi capture Fort Dansborg from Bernt Pessart.
1644	First English Civil War	Battle of Oswestry|	(England)	22–23 June	Parliamentarians defeat the Royalists.
1644	First English Civil War	Battle of Cropredy Bridge	(England)	29 June	King Charles defeats Parliamentarians under Waller.
1644	First English Civil War and Scottish Civil Wars	Battle of Marston Moor	(England)	2 July	Cromwellian Parliamentarians defeat King Charles' Royalists, securing the North for the Puritans.
1644	Battle of Vemgallu		(India)	21 August	A military conflict fought on 21 August, 1644 near the Vemgallu tank between the forces of the Vijayanagara Empire, led by Kistappa Nayak and Velugoti Singa and the Golconda Sultanate under Ghazi Ali.
1644	Wars of the Three Kingdoms	Battle of Lostwithiel	(Scotland)	21 Aug—2 Sep	The Royalists defeat the Parliamentarians.
1644	Thirty Years' War	Battle of Freiburg	(Germany)	Aug	Indecisive battle between French forces and the Bavarian army.
1644	Wars of the Three Kingdoms	Battle of Tippermuir	(England)	1 Sep	Montrose's Royalists defeat Elcho's Covenanters.
1644	Wars of the Three Kingdoms	Battle of Aberdeen	(Scotland)	13 Sep	Royalist victory over Covenanters.
1644	Maltese Corso	Action of 28 September 1644	(Greece)	28 Sep	The navy of Hospitaller Malta defeats the Ottoman Empire
1644	Torstenson War	Battle of Fehmarn	(Germany)	13 Oct	Swedish-Dutch victory over Denmark–Norway
1644	First English Civil War	Second Battle of Newbury	(England)	27 Oct	Parliamentarians block King Charles' return to London.
1644	Thirty Years' War	Battle of Jüterbog	(Germany)	3 Dec	Sweden under Torstensson defeats Holy Roman Empire.
1645	Scottish Civil War	Battle of Inverlochy	(Scotland)	2 Feb	Highlanders defeat Covenanters.
1645	First English Civil War	First Battle of Weymouth	(England)	9 Feb	Weymouth is captured by Royalists.
1645	Thirty Years' War	Battle of Jankau	(Czech Republic)	23 Feb	Swedish victory under Torstensson over an Imperial-Bavarian army under Hatzfeldt.
1645	First English Civil War	Second Battle of Weymouth	(England)	27 Feb	Weymouth is recaptured by Parliamentarians.
1645	Thirty Years' War	Battle of Herbsthausen	(Germany)	5 May	Bavaria under Mercy defeats France under Turenne.
1645	Scottish Civil War	Battle of Auldearn	(Scotland)	9 May	Royalist victory.
1645	First English Civil War	Battle of Naseby	(England)	14 June	Cromwell's Ironsides defeat Charles' Royalists.
1645	Scottish Civil War	Battle of Alford	(Scotland)	2 July	Covenanters are defeated by Royalists under Montrose.
1645	Thirty Years' War	Second Battle of Nördlingen	(Germany)	3 Aug	French-Hessian victory under d'Enghien and Turenne over an Imperial-Bavarian army under Mercy.
1645	Dutch invasions of Brazil	Battle of Tabocas	(Brazil)	3 Aug	Battle between the Dutch and the Portuguese army. Also known as the Battle of Mount Tabocas.
1645	Scottish Civil War	Battle of Kilsyth	(Scotland)	15 Aug	Montrose defeats Covenanters in decisive battle.
1645	Scottish Civil War	Battle of Philiphaugh	(Scotland)	13 Sep	Covenanters under Leslie surprise Montrose in camp; Montrose runs away.
1645	Eighty Years' War	Siege of Hulst	(Netherlands)	7 Oct—4 Nov	The heavily fortified town is conquered by Dutch troops under Frederick Henry after only 28 days.
1646	First English Civil War	Battle of Bovey Heath	(England)	9 Jan	Parliamentarians defeat the Royalists.
1646	First English Civil War	Battle of Torrington	(England)	16 Feb	Parliamentarians defeat the Royalists.
1646	Eighty Years' War	Battles of La Naval de Manila	(Philippines)	15 March—4 Oct	Two quickly fitted out Spanish-Filipino-crewed Manila galleons repel a Dutch invasion fleet in five separate battles.
1646	First English Civil War	Battle of Stow-on-the-Wold	(England)	21 March	Parliamentarians defeat the Royalists.
1646	Cretan War	Action of 26 May 1646	(Turkey)	26 May	Skirmish between Ottoman and Venetian troops.
1646	Irish Confederate Wars	Battle of Benburb	(Northern Ireland)	5 June	Irish Ulster army under O'Neill defeats Scots.
1646	Thirty Years' War and Franco-Spanish War	Battle of Orbetello	(Italy)	14–16 June	The Spanish Navy defeats France.
1647	Scottish Civil War	Battle of Rhunahaorine Moss	(Scotland)	24 May	Covenanters defeat the Royalists.
1647	Eighty Years' War	Battle of Puerto de Cavite	(Philippines)	10 June	Spanish defenders defeat Dutch invasion.
1647	Thirty Years' War	Battle of Triebl	(Czech Republic)	22 Aug	Imperial troops defeat Sweden.
1647	Irish Confederate Wars	Battle of Dungan's Hill	(Republic of Ireland)	Aug	Irish Leinster army are destroyed by Parliamentarians.
1647	Dutch–Portuguese War	Battle of Kombi	(Angola)	29 Oct	Decisive Dutch victory over the Portuguese Empire.
1647	Irish Confederate Wars	Battle of Knocknanuss	(Republic of Ireland)	13 Nov	Irish Munster army is destroyed by Inchiquin.
1647	Celali rebellions	Varvar Ali Pasha's Revolt	(Turkey)		Varvar Pasha revolted against Ibrahim of the Ottoman Empire , rebellion suppressed .
1648	Insurrection of Pernambuco	First Battle of Guararapes	(Brazil)	18 April	Dutch and Portuguese forces fight over dominion over the Pernambuco area of Brazil. Portuguese victory.
1648	Khmelnytsky Uprising	Battle of Zhovti Vody	(Ukraine)	29 April—16 May	First major battle in Khmelnytsky Uprising.
1648	Cretan War	Siege of Candia	(Greece)	1 May 1648 – 27 Sep 1669	21-year siege ending with Ottomans taking over Crete. The losses sustained by the Ottomans contributed to the Empire's downfall.
1648	Second English Civil War	Battle of St Fagans	(Wales)	8 May	Parliamentarians defeat the Royalists.
1648	Thirty Years' War	Battle of Zusmarshausen	(Germany)	17 May	French and Swedish defeat Holy Roman Empire.
1648	Khmelnytsky Uprising	Battle of Korsuń	(Ukraine)	26 May	Second major battle in the uprising.
1648	Second English Civil War	Siege of Pembroke	(England)	31 May—11 July	Parliamentarians defeat the Royalists.
1648	Second English Civil War	Battle of Maidstone	(England)	1 June	Parliamentarians defeat the Royalists.
1648	Thirty Years' War	Battle of Prague	(Czech Republic)	25 July—1 Nov	Sweden captures the left bank of Prague from the Habsburgs.
1648	Khmelnytsky Uprising	Battle of Starokostiantyniv	(Ukraine)	26–28 July	Major Cossack defeat.
1648	Second English Civil War	Battle of Preston	(England)	17 Aug	Cromwell defeats Hamilton.
1648	Thirty Years' War and Franco-Spanish War	Battle of Lens	(France)	20 Aug	France defeats Spain.
1648	Khmelnytsky Uprising	Battle of Pyliavtsi	(Ukraine)	23 Sep	Cossack pyrrhic victory.
1648	Dutch–Portuguese War	Recapture of Angola	(Angola)		Portuguese retake Angola from Dutch-Kongolese troops.
1649	Khmelnytsky Uprising	Battle of Mazyr	(Belarus)	8–9 Feb	Polish forces capture Mazyr.
1649	Insurrection of Pernambuco	Second Battle of Guararapes	(Brazil)	19 Feb	Portuguese forces defeat the Netherlands and conquer Pernambuco.
1649	Cretan War	Battle of Focchies	(Greece)	12 May	Venetians defeat Ottomans.
1649	Khmelnytsky Uprising	Battle of Zahal	(Belarus)	17–18 June	Polish victory over Cossacks.
1649	Khmelnytsky Uprising	Siege of Zbarazh	(Ukraine)	10 July—22 Aug	Polish forces are trapped in Zbarazh Castle.
1649	Khmelnytsky Uprising	First Battle of Loyew	(Belarus)	31 July	Radziwił takes on two Cossack armies and wins.
1649	Irish Confederate Wars	Battle of Rathmines	(Republic of Ireland)	2 Aug	An army of Irish and Royalist soldiers is destroyed, paving the way for the Cromwellian conquest of Ireland.
1649	Khmelnytsky Uprising	Battle of Zboriv	(Ukraine)	15–17 Aug	Liberated Polish troops are trapped in Zbarazh Castle.
1649	Beaver Wars	Destruction of Huronia	(Canada)		1200 armed Iroquois destroy Huron villages of St. Louis and St. Ignace near southern Georgian Bay, initiating Huron dispersal.
1650	Scotland in the Wars of the Three Kingdoms	Battle of Carbisdale	(Scotland)	27 April	Covenanters defeat Scottish royalists.
1650	Cromwellian Conquest of Ireland	Battle of Macroom	(Republic of Ireland)	10 May	England defeats Ireland.
1650	Cromwellian Conquest of Ireland	Battle of Tecroghan	(Republic of Ireland)	19 June	Inconclusive battle between the Parliamentarians and the Royalists and Irish.
1650	Cromwellian Conquest of Ireland	Battle of Scarrifholis	(Republic of Ireland)	21 June	Parliamentarians defeat the Irish.
1650	Anglo-Scottish War	Battle of Dunbar	(Scotland)	3 Sep	England defeats Scotland.
1650	Cromwellian Conquest of Ireland	Battle of Meelick Island	(Republic of Ireland)	25 Oct	Parliamentarians defeat the Irish.
1650	Franco-Spanish War	Action of 23 November 1650	(Spain)	23 Nov	The Spanish Navy defeats France.
1650	Anglo-Scottish War	Battle of Hieton	(Scotland)	1 Dec	England defeats Scotland.
1651	Khmelnytsky Uprising	Battle of Krasne	(Ukraine)	20–23 Feb	Poland defeats the Cossacks.
1651	Khmelnytsky Uprising	Battle of Kopychyntsi	(Ukraine)	12 May	Lithuanians defeat the Cossacks.
1651	Khmelnytsky Uprising	Battle of Berestechko	(Ukraine)	28–30 June	Ukrainian rebels clash with the Polish army in the largest battle of the 17th century.
1651	Cromwellian conquest of Ireland	Battle of Knocknaclashy	(Republic of Ireland)	June	England defeats Ireland.
1651	Khmelnytsky Uprising	Second Battle of Loyew	(Belarus)	6 July	Poles push Cossacks out of Loyew.
1651	Cretan War	Action of 10 July 1651	(Greece)	10 July	Minor battle.
1651	Reapers' War and Franco-Spanish War	Siege of Barcelona	(Spain)	4 Aug 1651 – 13 Oct 1652	Spain captures Barcelona from Catalonia. Catalonia was aided by France.
1651	Anglo-Scottish War	Battle of Worcester	(England)	3 Sep	Cromwell defeats Royalists. Charles, King of Scots escapes disguised as a servant.
1651	Khmelnytsky Uprising	Battle of Bila Tserkva	(Ukraine)	24–25 Sep	Poland defeats the Cossacks and the Crimean Khanate.
1651	Wars of the Three Kingdoms	Capture of Elizabeth Castle	(Jersey)	15 Dec	Parliamentary forces capture the Royalist Elizabeth Castle in Jersey.
1652	The Second Fronde	Battle of Bléneau	(France)	7 April	Condé commands Fronds against France under Turenne, but the outcome is inconclusive.
1652	Dutch invasions of Brazil	Recapture of Recife	(Brazil)	May 1652 – Feb 1654	Portugal captures Recife from the Netherlands.
1652	First Anglo-Dutch War	Battle of Dover	At sea	29 May	Clash between Blake's English and Tromp's Dutch fleets initiates the First Anglo-Dutch War.
1652	Khmelnytskyi Uprising	Battle of Batih	(Ukraine)	1–2 June	Cossack victory over Poles, and subsequent massacre of Poles.
1652	Ottoman-Habsburg wars	Battle of Vezekény	(Slovakia)	25 Aug	Austria and Hungary defeat the Ottoman Empire.
1652	First Anglo-Dutch War	Battle of Plymouth	(England)	26 Aug	De Ruyter's 36 men-of-war hold off Ayscue's 45 men-of-war, driving them away.
1652	First Anglo-Dutch War	Battle of Elba	(Italy)	28 Aug	Dutch victory over the English fleet.
1652	First Anglo-Dutch War	Battle of the Kentish Knock	(England)	8 Oct	Blake beats back de With.
1652	First Anglo-Dutch War	Battle of Dungeness	(England)	10 Dec	Tromp defeats Blake.
1652		Siege of Vellore Fort	(India)		Sultanate of Golconda takes last possession of the Vijayanagara.
1653	First Anglo-Dutch War	Battle of Portland	(England)	28 Feb—2 March	Tromp, outnumbered, loses a dozen men-of-war and 50 merchantmen to Blake.
1653	First Anglo-Dutch War	Battle of Livorno	(Italy)	13–14 March	Van Galen's ships defeat Badiley, ending in a Dutch naval victory over the English.
1653	Moldavian campaign of Tymofiy Khmelnytsky	Battle of Finta	(Romania)	27 May	Wallachia and Poland-Lithuania defeat Moldavia, the Cossack Hetmanate and the Crimean Khanate.
1653	First Anglo-Dutch War	Battle of the Gabbard	(England)	12–13 June	English victory over the Dutch. Also known as the Battle of North Foreland.
1653	First Anglo-Dutch War	Battle of Scheveningen	(Netherlands)	8–10 Aug	English victory over the Dutch; Tromp killed.
1653	Khmelnytskyi Uprising	Battle of Zhvanets	(Ukraine)	Sep—15 Dec	Cossacks surround Polish king.
1653	Franco-Spanish War	Battle of Bordeaux	(France)	20 Oct	Spain destroys a large French fleet.
1653	Portuguese Restoration War	Battle of Arronches	(Portugal)	8 Nov	Portugal defeats Spain.
1654	Arauco War	Battle of Rio Bueno	(Chile)	11 Jan	Mapuche and Huilliche defeat the Spanish.
1654	Dutch–Portuguese War	Action of 23 March 1654	(Sri Lanka)	23 March	Portuguese have their two top officers killed but still win the battle.
1654	Dutch–Portuguese War	Action of 2 May 1654	(Sri Lanka)	2 May	Dutch defeat the Portuguese at sea near Colombo.
1654	Cretan War	Battle of Perast	(Montenegro)	15 May	Venetian victory over the Ottoman Empire.
1654	Cretan War	First Battle of the Dardanelles	(Turkey)	16 May	First of Venetian attempts to capture Dardanelles. Ottoman victory.
1654	Russo-Polish War and Tsar Alexei's campaign of 1654–1655	Siege of Smolensk	(Russia)	6 July—16 Sep	Russia captures Smolensk from Poland-Lithuania.
1654	Russo-Polish War and Tsar Alexei's campaign of 1654–1655	Battle of Shklow	(Belarus)	12 Aug	Among the first battles of the Russo-Polish War. Russian victory.
1654	Russo-Polish War and Tsar Alexei's campaign of 1654–1655	Battle of Shepeleviche	(Belarus)	24–25 Aug	Among the first battles of the Russo-Polish War. Russian victory.
1654	Franco-Spanish War	Battle of Arras	(France)	25 Aug	French defeat Spanish.
1655	Russo-Polish War and Tsar Alexei's campaign of 1654–1655	Battle of Okhmativ	(Ukraine)	29 Jan—1 Feb	Russians join the Deluge. Poland-Lithuania and the Crimean Khanate defeat Russia.
1655	Wars of the Three Kingdoms	Battle of the Severn	(United States)	25 March	The Puritans of Providence, now defeat the forces of Baltimore.
1655	Cretan War	Second Battle of the Dardanelles	(Turkey)	21 June	Venetian victory over the Ottoman Empire.
1655	Northern War of 1655–1660 and The Deluge	Battle of Ujście	(Poland)	24–25 July	Sweden defeats Poland-Lithuania.
1655	Polish–Russian War	Battle of Vilnius	(Lithuania)	8 Aug	Russian-Cossack troops attack Vilnius and defeat Poland-Lithuania.
1655	Northern War of 1655–1660 and The Deluge	Battle of Sobota	(Poland)	23 Aug	Sweden defeats Poland-Lithuania.
1655	Northern War of 1655–1660 and The Deluge	Battle of Żarnów	(Poland)	16 Sep	Sweden defeats Poland-Lithuania.
1655	Northern War of 1655–1660 and The Deluge	First Battle of Kraków	(Poland)	25 Sep—13 Oct	Swedes capture Kraków from Poland-Lithuania.
1655	Russo-Polish War	Battle of Horodok	(Ukraine)	29 Sep	Russians defeat Poles and gain access to Lviv.
1655	Northern War of 1655–1660 and The Deluge	Battle of Nowy Dwór	(Poland)	30 Sep	Swedish victory over Poland-Lithuania
1655	Northern War of 1655–1660 and The Deluge	Battle of Wojnicz	(Poland)	3 Oct	Swedish victory over Poland-Lithuania
1655	Northern War of 1655–1660 and The Deluge	Battle of Częstochowa	(Poland)	18 Nov—27 Dec	Failed Swedish attack on Jasna Góra monastery in Poland-Lithuania.
1655	Northern War of 1655–1660 and The Deluge	Battle of Krosno	(Poland)	7 Dec	First major Polish victory over Sweden.
1655	Northern War of 1655–1660 and The Deluge	Siege of Danzig	(Poland)	1655—1660	Five-year Swedish siege on Poland.
1656	First War of Villmergen	Battle of Villmergen	(Switzerland)	24 Jan	Luzern, Zug and the Freie Ämter defeat Bern.
1656	Northern War of 1655–1660 and The Deluge	Battle of Radom	(Poland)	2 Feb	Swedish victory over Poland-Lithuania
1656	Northern War of 1655–1660 and The Deluge	Battle of Gołąb	(Poland)	18–19 Feb	Swedish victory over Poland-Lithuania, although their troops came at different times.
1656	Northern War of 1655–1660 and The Deluge	Siege of Zamość	(Poland)	25 Feb—1 March	Poles hold Zamość from Sweden
1656	Northern War of 1655–1660 and The Deluge	Battle of Jarosław	(Poland)	15 March	Poles hold Jarosław from Sweden
1656	Northern War of 1655–1660 and The Deluge	Battle of Sandomierz	(Poland)	24–26 March	Swedish king escapes Polish hands.
1656	Northern War of 1655–1660 and The Deluge	Battle of Nisko	(Poland)	28 March	Swedes capture Nisko from Poland-Lithuania
1656		Battle of Bloody Run	(United States)	March or April	Virginia Colony and Pamunkey tribe defeat against the "Richahecrian" tribe.
1656	Northern War of 1655–1660 and The Deluge	Battle of Warka	(Poland)	7 April	First Polish success since the Swedish invasion.
1656	Northern War of 1655–1660 and The Deluge	Battle of Kłecko	(Poland)	7 May	Pyrrhic victory for the Swedes over Poland-Lithuania
1656	Northern War of 1655–1660 and The Deluge	Battle of Kcynia	(Poland)	1 June	Swedish victory over Poland-Lithuania
1656	Northern War of 1655–1660 and The Deluge	Battle of Tykocin	(Poland)	13 June	Swedish victory aided by Brandenburgers against Poland-Lithuania
1656	Cretan War	Third Battle of the Dardanelles	(Turkey)	26 June	Venice and Malta defeat Ottomans.
1656	Northern War of 1655–1660 and The Deluge	First Battle of Warsaw	(Poland)	30 June	Poland retakes capital from Sweden.
1656	Franco-Spanish War	Battle of Valenciennes	(France)	16 July	Spain defeats France.
1656	Northern War of 1655–1660 and The Deluge	Second Battle of Warsaw	(Poland)	18–20 July	Charles X Gustavus of Sweden defeats Poland. All significant countries in the Northern War declare war upon him.
1656	Second Northern War and Russo-Swedish War	Siege of Dyneburg	(Latvia)	18–31 July	Russians capture Daugavpils from Sweden and massacre its defenders.
1656	Second Northern War and Russo-Swedish War	Storm of Kokenhusen	(Latvia)	14 Aug	Russians capture a Swedish Livonian fortress.
1656	Russo-Swedish War	Siege of Riga	(Latvia)	21 Aug—5 Oct	Swedes manage to hold Riga against Russia
1656	Second Northern War and The Deluge	Battle of Łowicz	(Poland)	25 Aug	Polish victory over Sweden.
1656	Second Northern War and The Deluge	Battle of Lubrze	(Poland)	28 Aug	Polish hold Lubrze against Sweden and Brandenburg
1656	Anglo–Spanish War	Battle of Cádiz	(Spain)	9 Sep	England defeats Spain.
1656	Second Northern War and The Deluge	Battle of Prostken	(Poland)	8 Oct	Prince Bogusław Radziwiłł, commanding an army from Sweden and brandenburg is defeated by the Polish and the Crimean Khanate.
1656	Second Northern War and The Deluge	Battle of Filipów	(Poland)	22 Oct	Swedish-Prussian victory over Poland-Lithuania.
1656	Second Northern War and The Deluge	Battle of Chojnice	(Poland)	25 Dec	Unknown timeline. Sweden defeats Poland.
1657	Anglo–Spanish War	Battle of Santa Cruz de Tenerife	(Spain)	20 April	England defeats Spain.
1657	Cretan War	Action of 3 May 1657		3 May	Venetian victory over Ottomans.
1657	Cretan War	Action of 18 May 1657		18 May	Venetian victory over Ottomans.
1657	Russo-Swedish War	Battle of Walk	(Poland)	8 July	Sweden defeats Russia.
1657	Second Northern War and The Deluge	Siege of Kraków	(Estonia)	8 July—August	Polish retake Kraków.
1657	Khmelnytsky Uprising, Second Northern War and The Deluge	Battle of Magierów	(Ukraine)	11 July	Poles defeat a Transylvanian-Cossack-Wallachian army.
1657	Cretan War	Fourth Battle of the Dardanelles	(Turkey)	17–19 July	Ottomans break Venetian blockade of the Straits.
1657	Khmelnytsky Uprising, Second Northern War and The Deluge	Battle of Czarny Ostrów	(Ukraine)	20 July	Poles attack a Transylvanian camp.
1657	The Deluge	Battle of Skałat	(Ukraine)	26 July	One of the final Tatar victories.
1657	Dano-Swedish War	Battle of Ängelholm	(Sweden)	5–13 Aug	Denmark–Norway defeats Sweden.
1657	Dano-Swedish War	Battle of Genevadsbro	(Sweden)	31 Aug	Sweden defeats Denmark–Norway.
1657	Dano-Swedish War	Battle of Møn	(Denmark)	12–13 Sep	Inconclusive naval battle between Denmark–Norway and Sweden.
1657	Russo-Swedish War	Battle of Gdov	(Russia)	16 Sep	Russia defeats Sweden.
1657	Dano-Swedish War	Battle of Hjärtum	(Sweden)	27 Sep	Denmark–Norway defeats Sweden.
1657	Dano-Swedish War	Battle of Kattarp	(Sweden)	3 Oct	Inconclusive battle between Denmark–Norway and Sweden.
1657	Dano-Swedish War	Storming of Frederiksodde	(Denmark)	24 Oct	Sweden captures Fredericia from Denmark–Norway.
1657	Anglo–Spanish War	Battle of Ocho Rios	(Jamaica)	30 Oct	England defeats Spain.
1658	Dano-Swedish War	Battle of Tybrind Vig	(Denmark)	30 Jan	Sweden defeats Denmark–Norway.
1658	Dano-Swedish War	March Across the Belts	(Denmark)	30 Jan—15 Feb	Sweden defeats Denmark–Norway.
1658	The Deluge	Battle of Szkudy	(Lithuania)	18 May	Indecisive results between Sweden and Poland-Lithuania.
1658	Mughal war of succession	Battle of Samugarh	(India)	29 May	Aurangzeb defeats Dara Shikoh and wins the Mughal throne.
1658	Franco-Spanish War and Anglo-Spanish War	Battle of the Dunes	(France)	14 June	English and French defeat Spanish at Dunkirk.
1658	Anglo-Spanish War	Battle of Rio Nuevo	(Jamaica)	25–27 June	England defeats Spain.
1658	Portuguese Restoration War	Siege of Badajoz	(Spain)	13 July—mid-October	Portugal fails to capture Badajoz from Spain.
1658	Portuguese Restoration War	Battle of Vilanova	(Portugal)	17 Sep	Spain defeats Portugal.
1658	Russo-Polish War	Battle of Verkiai	(Lithuania)	24 Sep—11 Oct	Stalemate in the Russo-Polish War ends.
1658	Second Northern War	Battle of the Sound	(Denmark)	29 Oct	Dutch win naval battle against Swedes.
1658	Second Northern War	Battle of Kolding	(Denmark)	25 Dec	Poland and Denmark defeat Sweden.
1659	Mughal war of succession	Battle of Khajwa	(India)	5 Jan	Aurangzeb takes total control of the Mughal Empire after defeating Shah Shuja.
1659	Portuguese Restoration War	Battle at Elvas	(Portugal)	14 Jan	Portuguese defeat Spain.
1659	Second Northern War	Assault on Copenhagen	(Denmark)	11 Feb	Danes hold Copenhagen from Swedes.
1659	Russo-Polish War	Battle of Myadel	(Belarus)	8 May	Russian victory over Poland-Lithuania.
1659	Russo-Polish War	Battle of Konotop	(Ukraine)	29 June	Cossacks under Vyhovsky defeat Russians.
1659	Janissary revolts	Odjak of Algiers Revolution	(Algeria)	June- September	End of the Pashas period ,Regency of Algiers becomes defacto independent.
1659	Dano-Swedish War	Battle of Ebeltoft	(Denmark)	23 July	Swedish victory over Denmark–Norway and the Netherlands.
1659	Second Northern War and The Deluge	Battle of Grudziądz	(Poland)	29–30 Aug	Polish victory over Sweden, but Grudziądz is destroyed.
1659	Battle of Grama		(India)	September	A military conflict fought between the Keladi Kingdom under Shivappa Nayaka and the Kingdom of Mysore under General Hamparajaiya.
1659	Kakhetian Uprising (1659)	Battle of Bakhtrioni	(Georgia (country))	Sep	Kakheti uprising against Safavids.
1659	The Maratha rebellion	Battle of Pratapgarh	(India)	10 Nov	Marathas defeat Adilshahis and make major territorial gains.
1659	Dano-Swedish War	Battle of Nyborg	(Denmark)	14 Nov	Final battle of Dano-Swedish War. The navies of Denmark–Norway, Brandenburg-Prussia, Poland-Lithuania and the Netherlands defeat Sweden.
1659	The Maratha rebellion	Battle of Kohlapur	(India)	28 Dec	Maratha warriors defeat Adilshahi forces.
1660	Russo-Polish War	Siege of Lyakhavichy	(Belarus)	23 March—28 June	Russians fail to capture a Lithuanian fortress.
1660	Russo-Polish War	Battle of Vilnius	(Lithuania)		Grand Duchy of Lithuania recaptures city from Russia.
1660	Beaver Wars	Battle of Long Sault	(Canada)	Early May	Iroquois defeat the French, Wyandot and Algonquin.
1660		Battle of Kaloszvar	(Romania)	22 May	The Ottoman Empire defeats the Principality of Transylvania and Austria.
1660	The Maratha rebellion	Battle of Chakan	(India)	23 June—14 Aug	Mughals mine out fort, force Marathas to surrender.
1660	Russo-Polish War	Battle of Polonka	(Belarus)	29 June	Polish–Lithuanian army defeats Russians.
1660	The Maratha rebellion	Battle of Pavan Khind	(India)	13 July	Marathas defeat Bijapur Sultanate.
1660	Russo-Polish War	Battle of Basya	(Belarus)	24–28 Sep	Draw between Poland-Lithuania and Russia.
1660	Russo-Polish War	Battle of Slobodyshche	(Ukraine)	7–8 Oct	Stalemate between Poland-Lithuania and Russia. Likely the precursor to the Battle of Chudnov.
1660	Russo-Polish War	Battle of Chudnov	(Ukraine)	14 Oct—2 Nov	Polish–Lithuanian and Crimean Khanate armies defeat Russian and Cossacks armies.
1660	Russo-Polish War	Battle of Lyubar	(Ukraine)	14–27 Dec	Major Russian defeat against Poland-Lithuania.

== 1661–1680 ==
Year	War	Battle	Loc.	Date(s)	Description
1661	The Maratha rebellion	Battle of Umberkhind	(India)	3 Feb	Maratha early victory over Mughals.
1661	Cretan War	Action of 27 August 1661	(Greece)	27 Aug	Venetian and Maltese victory over the Ottoman Empire.
1661	Sino-Dutch conflicts	Siege of Fort Zeelandia	(Taiwan)	30 Aug	The Dutch East India Company's rule over Taiwan ends. Under Koxinga, Southern Ming captures Fort Zeelandia.
1661	Russo-Polish War	Battle of Kushliki	(Belarus)	4 Nov	Polish victory over Russia.
1661	Arauco War	Battle of Curanilahue	(Chile)	Nov	Spain defeats the Mapuche.
1662	Battle of Kanagala		(India)	March	A military conflict fought between the Keladi Nayakas under Shivalinga Nayaka and the Kingdom of Mysore under Dalavai Kantaiya of Kalale.
1662	Mir Jumla's invasion of Assam	Battle of Kaliabor	(India)	3 March	Mughal victory over the Ahom Kingdom in their fight for dominance of Assam.
1662	Cretan War	Action of 29 September 1662	(Greece)	29 Sep	Venetian ambush on Ottomans.
1662		Battle of Zhovnyn	(Ukraine)		Between Ukrainian and Moscow troops.
1663	Portuguese Restoration War	Battle of Ameixial	(Portugal)	8 June	Portugal and England defeat Spain.
1663	Austro-Turkish War	Battle of Köbölkút	(Slovakia)	6 Aug	Ottoman victory over Austria.
1664	Maratha campaigns in Gujarat	Battle of Surat	(India)	6–10 Jan	Marathas defeat outnumbered Mughals.
1664	Russo–Polish War	Siege of Hlukhiv	(Ukraine)	Jan	One of the worst Polish defeats. Polish-Crimean-Cossack army fails to capture Hlukhiv from Russia.
1664	Austro-Turkish War	Siege of Nitra	(Slovakia)	17 April—3 May	Habsburg forces under de Souches recapture Nitra from the Ottomans.
1664	Austro-Turkish War	Battle of Zsarnóca	(Slovakia)	16 May	The Holy Roman Empire defeats the Ottoman Empire.
1664	Croatian–Ottoman wars and Ottoman–Habsburg wars	Siege of Novi Zrin	(Croatia)	6 June	Novi Zrin is destroyed after its capture by the Ottomans.
1664	Portuguese Restoration War	Battle of Castelo Rodrigo	(Portugal)	7 July	Portugal defeats Spain.
1664	Austro-Turkish War	Siege of Léva	(Slovakia)	19 July	Habsburg victory over Ottomans, with de Souches recapturing Léva.
1664		Djidjelli expedition	(Algeria)	22 July	Algerians push out French forces.
1664	Austro-Turkish War	Battle of Körmend	(Hungary)	26–27 July	France and the Holy Roman Empire defeat the Ottoman Empire.
1664	Russo-Polish War	Battle of Stavishche	(Ukraine)	July—Oct	Polish victory and one of the last battles of the Russo-Polish War.
1664	Austro-Turkish War	Battle of Saint Gotthard	(Austria)	1 Aug	The Holy Roman Empire and France defeat the Ottoman Empire.
1665	The Maratha rebellion	Battle of Purandar	(India)	31 March—12 June	The Mughals defeat the Maratha Empire
1665		Action of March 1665	(Tunisia)	March	French forces defeat Algerians.
1665	Second Anglo-Dutch War	Battle of Lowestoft	(England)	13 June	Biggest naval defeat in Dutch history.
1665	Portuguese Restoration War	Battle of Montes Claros	(Portugal)	17 June	Portuguese forces decisively defeat Spain in the last major battle of the Portuguese Restoration War.
1665	Second Anglo-Dutch War	Battle of Vågen	(Norway)	2 Aug	English fleet defeated by the Dutch without losing any ships.
1665	Portuguese colonisation of Africa	Battle of Ambuila	(Angola)	29 Oct	Portuguese forces defeat and kill King António I, ending the kingdom's native rule. Also known as the Battle of Mbwila.
1666	Second Anglo-Dutch War	Four Days' Battle	(England)	1–4 June	One of the longest naval engagements in history ends with a Dutch (under de Ruyter) victory against the English.
1666	Lubomirski Rebellion	Battle of Mątwy	(Poland)	13 July	Largest battle of the rebellion. Rebels defeat Poland-Lithuania.
1666	Second Anglo-Dutch War	St. James's Day Battle	(England)	4–5 Aug	Another huge naval clash between England and the Netherlands. Close victory for England. Also known as Two Days' Battle.
1667	Second Anglo-Dutch War	Raid on the Medway	(England)	19–24 June	England's largest naval defeat in history. A successful Dutch attack, under de Ruyter on English ships at their main naval base in Chatham. Also known as Battle of Chatham.
1667	Polish–Cossack–Tatar War	Battle of Podhajce	(Ukraine)	6–16 Oct	Polish victory over Tatars.
1669	Ahom–Mughal conflicts	Battle of Alaboi	(India)	5 Aug	Mughal victory over the Ahom kingdom.
1669		Battle of Cádiz	(Spain)	18–19 Dec	English defeat Algerians.
1669	Colonisation of Hokkaido	Shakushain's revolt	(Japan)	1669 to 1672	Japanese victory.
1670	The Maratha rebellion	Battle of Sinhagad	(India)	4 Feb	Fort Sinhagad captured by Marathas.
1670	Kongo Civil War	Battle of Mbidizi River	(Angola)	June	Portuguese victory. Soyon leader is killed.
1670	Kongo Civil War	Battle of Kitombo	(Angola)	18 Oct	Soyo-Ngoyo victory over Portuguese.
1671	Ahom-Mughal conflicts	Battle of Saraighat	(India)	March	Ahoms, led by Borphukan, defeat Mughals, led by rajput Raja Ramsingh I, successfully defending Guwahati in the last major Mughal invasion of Assam.
1671		Battle of Pungo Andongo	(Angola)	Feb – 18 Nov	Portugal defeats the Kingdom of Ndongo.
1672	The Maratha rebellion	Battle of Salher	(India)	Feb	First pitched battle where Mughals lost to Marathas.
1672	Franco-Dutch War	Action of 12 March 1672	(England)	2 March	Dutch convoy escapes the English navy.
1672	Franco-Dutch War	Siege of Groenlo	(Netherlands)	1–10 June	Ten-day siege of Groenlo by French forces ends in the town's surrender.
1672	Franco-Dutch War and Third Anglo-Dutch War	Battle of Solebay	(England)	7 June	Naval battle between Dutch and Anglo-French fleets. England and France are forced to abandon plans for a blockade.
1672	Franco-Dutch War	Battle of Tolhuis	(Netherlands)	12 June	France defeats the Netherlands.
1672	Franco-Dutch War	Siege of Nijmegen	(Netherlands)	2–9 July	France captures Nijmegen from the Netherlands.
1672	Franco-Dutch War and Second Münster War	Siege of Groningen	(Netherlands)	9 July—17 Aug	Dutch victory over the Münster, ending all hope to push deeper into the Netherlands.
1672	Polish-Ottoman War	Battle of Ładyżyn	(Ukraine)	18 July	Pyrrhic victory for the Poles against the Ottoman Empire.
1672	Polish-Ottoman War	Siege of Kamenets	(Ukraine)	18–27 Aug	Ottomans capture Kamienets from Poland-Lithuania.
1672	Polish-Ottoman War	Battle of Krasnobród	(Netherlands)	5–6 Oct	Poles attack Tatars trying to capture Zamość.
1672	Polish-Ottoman War	Battle of Niemirów	(Ukraine)	7–8 Oct	Poles push out more Tatars.
1672	Polish-Ottoman War	Battle of Komarno	(Ukraine)	9 Oct	Poles push Tatars back to the Dniester.
1672	Franco-Dutch War	Battle of Woerden	(Netherlands)	12 Oct	France defeats the Netherlands. Also known as the Battle of Kruipin.
1673	Franco-Dutch War	Battle of Saint-Lothain	(France)	25 Feb	Burgundian loyalists of the king of Spain defeat pro-French rebels.
1673	Franco-Dutch War	First Battle of Schooneveld	(Netherlands)	7 June	Dutch naval victory over England and France.
1673	Franco-Dutch War	Siege of Maastricht	(Netherlands)	11 June	Key element in King Louis XIV's plans to attack the Netherlands. French victory.
1673	Franco-Dutch War	Second Battle of Schooneveld	(Netherlands)	14–15 June	Dutch win naval battle after poor fighting on both sides.
1673	Franco-Dutch War and Third Anglo-Dutch War	Battle of Texel	(Netherlands)	21 Aug	Dutch defeat an English and French attempt at naval invasion.
1673	Third Anglo-Dutch War	Battle of Masulipatnam	(India)	1 Sep	Dutch East India Company naval victory over the English East India Company.
1673	Franco-Dutch War	Siege of Naarden	(Netherlands)	6–13 Sep	The Netherlands, aided by Spain, liberate Naarden from France.
1673	Franco-Dutch War	Siege of Bonn	(Germany)	3–12 Nov	Dutch, Spanish and Imperial troops capture Bonn from Cologne. French troops help Cologne defend its capital but ultimately fail.
1673	Polish–Ottoman War	Battle of Khotyn	(Ukraine)	11 Nov	Polish–Lithuanian Commonwealth forces defeat Ottoman Empire.
1674	Franco-Dutch War	Siege of Gray	(France)	23–28 Feb	France captures Gray from Spain.
1674	Franco-Dutch War	Battle of Scey-sur-Saône	(France)	2 March	Inconclusive battle between France and a Burgundian army fighting for the king of Spain.
1674	Franco-Dutch War	Battle of Chariez	(France)	3 March	Strategic victory of France against a Burgundian army.
1674	Third Anglo-Dutch War	Battle of Ronas Voe	(Scotland)	14 March	English defeat Dutch East India Company.
1674	Franco-Dutch War	Siege of Arbois	(France)	27–31 March	France fails to capture Arbois from a local army of the County of Burgundy.
1674	Franco-Dutch War	Battle of Orgelet	(France)	31 March—1 April	Strategic victory of an army of the County of Burgundy against France.
1674	Franco-Dutch War	Siege of Besançon	(France)	26 April—22 May	France captures Besançon from Spain.
1674	Franco-Dutch War	Siege of Dole	(France)	26 May—6 June	France captures Dole from Spain.
1674	Franco-Dutch War	Siege of Salins	(France)	4–21 June	France captures Salins-les-Bains from Spain.
1674	Franco-Dutch War	Battle of Sinsheim	(Germany)	16 June	France defeats the Holy Roman Empire.
1674	Franco-Dutch War	Siege of Faucogney	(France)	3–4 July	France captures Faucogney-et-la-Mer from Spain.
1674	Franco-Dutch War	Invasion of Martinique	(Martinique)	19–21 July	The Netherlands fail to capture Fort Royal from France.
1674	Franco-Dutch War	Siege of Grave	(Netherlands)	25 July—27 Oct	The Dutch recapture Grave from France after a difficult siege.
1674	Franco-Dutch War	Battle of Seneffe	(France)	11 Aug	The French attack a Dutch-Imperial-Spanish force in what would be one of the bloodiest battles of the century.
1674	Franco-Dutch War	Battle of Entzheim	(Belgium)	4 Oct	Inconclusive battle between France and the Holy Roman Empire.
1674	Franco-Dutch War	Battle of Mulhouse	(France)	29 Dec	France defeats the Holy Roman Empire.
1675	Franco-Dutch War	Battle of Turckheim	(France)	5 Jan	France defeats Imperial and Prussian troops and reconquers Alsace.
1675	Franco-Dutch War	First Battle of Stromboli	(Italy)	11 Feb	A French navy defeats Spain.
1675	Swedish-Brandenburg War	Battle of Rathenow	(Germany)	16 June	Brandenburg-Prussia defeats Sweden.
1675	Swedish-Brandenburg War	Battle of Nauen	(Germany)	27 June	Brandenburg-Prussia defeats Sweden.
1675	Scanian War	Battle of Fehrbellin	(Germany)	28 June	Swedes invade Brandenburg and lose.
1675	Franco-Dutch War	Battle of Salzbach	(Germany)	27 July	Inconclusive battle between the Holy Roman Empire and France.
1675	Ottoman–Habsburg wars	Siege of Oran and Mers El Kébir	(Algeria)	July 1675 – Jan 1678	The Regency of Algiers fails to capture Oran and Mers El Kébir from Spain.
1675	Franco-Dutch War	Battle of Altenheim	(Germany)	1 Aug	Inconclusive battle between the Holy Roman Empire and France.
1675	Franco-Dutch War	Battle of Konzer Brücke	(Germany)	11 Aug	The Holy Roman Empire defeats France.
1675	Polish–Ottoman War	Battle of Lwów	(Ukraine)	24 Aug	Sobieski defeats Turkish and Crimean Tatar forces.
1675	Polish–Ottoman War	Battle of Trembowla	(Ukraine)	20 Sep—11 Oct	Polish victory over the Ottoman Empire. Heavily glorified.
1675	Scanian War	Siege of Wismar	(Germany)	21 Oct—13 Dec	Denmark–Norway captures Wismar from Sweden.
1675	King Philip's War	Great Swamp Fight	(United States)	16 Dec	English colonial forces in New England destroy the headquarters of the Narragansett.
1676	Franco-Dutch War	Second Battle of Stromboli	(Italy)	6 Jan	Draw between the Dutch and French navies.
1676	Franco-Dutch War	Battle of Agosta	(Italy)	22 April	Draw between the French and Dutch navy. De Ruyter is wounded and dies a week later. The French retreat out of respect for the wounded Admiral.
1676	American Indian Wars spillovers	Bacon's Rebellion	(United States)	1676–1677	Failure of the rebellion.
1676	Scanian War	Battle of Bornholm	At sea	25–26 May	Danish-Dutch fleet defeats Swedish fleet.
1676	Scanian War	Battle of Öland	(Sweden)	1 June	Danish-Dutch fleet defeats Swedish fleet.
1676	Franco-Dutch War	Battle of Palermo	(Italy)	2 June	France defeats Dutch and Spanish navies.
1676	Franco-Dutch War	Siege of Maastricht	(Netherlands)	6 June—27 Aug	The Netherlands and Spain lift the siege of Maastricht after the advance of a French relief army.
1676	Franco-Dutch War	Siege of Philippsburg	(Germany)	23 June—17 Sep	The Holy Roman Empire captures Philippsburg from France.
1676	Scanian War	Battle of Vänersborg	(Sweden)	25–26 June	Denmark–Norway defeats Sweden.
1676	Scanian War	Battle of Ystad	(Sweden)	28 June	Denmark-Norway and the Netherlands defeat Sweden.
1676	Scanian War	Siege of Landskrona	(Sweden)	5 July—3 Aug	Denmark-Norway captures Landskrona from Sweden.
1676	Scanian War	Battle of Hunneberg	(Sweden)	July	Denmark-Norway defeats Sweden.
1676	Scanian War	Siege of Kristianstad	(Sweden)	10–15 Aug	Denmark-Norway captures Kristianstad from Sweden.
1676	Scanian War	Battle of Halmstad	(Sweden)	17 Aug	Sweden defeats Denmark-Norway.
1676	Polish–Ottoman War	Battle of Żurawno	(Ukraine)	25 Sep—14 Oct	Final battle of the war.
1676	Trunajaya rebellion	Battle of Gegodog	(Indonesia)	13 Oct	Trunajaya rebels defeat forces loyal to the Mataram Sultanate.
1676	Scanian War	Battle of Lund	(Sweden)	4 Dec	Swedish troops defeat Danish troops in the bloodiest battle in Scandinavian history with over 9,000 dead, about 50% losses on both sides.
1677	Scanian War	Siege of Kristianopel	(Sweden)	11–25 Feb	Sweden captures Kristianopel from Denmark–Norway.
1677	Franco-Dutch War	Siege of Valenciennes	(France)	28 Feb—17 March	France captures Valenciennes from Spain.
1677	Scanian War	Siege of Karlshamn	(Sweden)	1–8 March	Sweden captures Karlshamn from Denmark-Norway.
1677	Franco-Dutch War	Action of March 1677	(Trinidad and Tobago)	3 March	The Dutch navy defeats France near Tobago.
1677	Franco-Dutch War	Siege of Cambrai	(France)	20 March—19 April	France captures Cambrai from Spain.
1677	Franco-Dutch War	Battle of Cassel	(France)	11 April	French victory under Orléans against the Dutch under William of Orange, stadtholder of the Netherlands.
1677	Trunajaya rebellion	Battle of Surabaya	(Indonesia)	4–13 May	Dutch East India Company defeats Trunajaya rebels on behalf of the Mataram Sultanate.
1677	Scanian War	Battle of Møn	At sea	31 May	The navy of Denmark-Norway defeats Sweden.
1677	Scanian War	Battle of Malmö	(Sweden)	11 June—5 July	Swedish victory over Denmark.
1677	Scanian War	Siege of Stettin	(Poland)	25 June—15 Dec	Brandenburg-Prussia, Denmark-Norway and Brunswick-Lüneburg capture Stettin from Sweden.
1677	Scanian War	Battle of Køge Bay	(Denmark)	1–2 July	Greatest naval victory in Danish history. Denmark-Norway and the Netherlands defeat Sweden.
1677	Scanian War	Battle of Marstrand	(Sweden)	6–23 July	Danish-Norwegian victory over Sweden.
1677	Scanian War	Battle of Landskrona	(Sweden)	14 July	Swedish victory over Denmark.
1677	Russo-Turkish War (1672–1681)	Battle of Buzhyn	(Ukraine)	27–28 Aug	Russia and the Cossack Hetmanate defeat the Ottoman Empire and the Crimean Khanate.
1677	Scanian War	Battle of Uddevalla	(Sweden)	28 Aug	Danish victory over Sweden.
1677	Franco-Dutch War	Battle of Kochersberg	(France)	7 Oct	Inconclusive battle between France and the Holy Roman Empire.
1677	Scanian War	Siege of Kristianstad	(Sweden)	Oct 1677 – 4 Aug 1678	Sweden captures Kristianstad from Denmark-Norway.
1677	Franco-Dutch War	Siege of Freiburg	(Germany)	9–16 Nov	France captures Freiburg im Breisgau from Austria and the Imperial army.
1678	Scanian War	Battle of Warksow	(Germany)	18 Jan	Sweden defeats Denmark–Norway and Brandenburg-Prussia.
1678	Franco-Dutch War	Siege of Ypres	(Belgium)	18–25 March	France captures Ypres from Spain.
1678	Scanian War	Siege of Bohus fortress	(Sweden)	4 June—21 July	Sweden captures Bohus Fortress from Denmark-Norway.
1678	Franco-Dutch War	Battle of Rheinfelden	(Germany)	6 July	France defeats the Holy Roman Empire.
1678	Franco-Dutch War	Battle of Ortenbach	(Germany)	23 July	France defeats the Holy Roman Empire.
1678	Franco-Dutch War	Battle of Saint Denis	(Belgium)	15 Aug	Inconclusive battle between France and a Dutch-Spanish army. Last battle of the Franco-Dutch War.
1678	Scanian War	Siege of Stralsund	(Germany)	20 Sep—15 Oct	Brandenburg-Prussia captures Stralsund from Sweden.
1678	Trunajaya rebellion	Capture of Kediri	(Indonesia)	25 Nov	After weeks of marching, an allied Mataram–Dutch force takes Kediri, the stronghold of the Trunajaya rebellion, by force.
1679	Scanian War	Battle of Telšiai	(Lithuania)	7 Feb	Strategic victory of Brandenburg-Prussia against Sweden.
1679	Pre-Deccan wars	Battle of Bhupalgarh	(India)	2 April	Mughal victory over the Marathas.
1679	Scottish Covenanter Wars	Battle of Drumclog	(Scotland)	1 June	Covenanters defeat the Royalists.
1679	Scottish Covenanter Wars	Battle of Bothwell Bridge	(Scotland)	22 June	Royalists defeat the Covenanters.
1680		Battle of Ovčí vrch	(Czech Republic)	6 May	Royal Habsburg forces defeat a peasant rebellion in Bohemia.

== 1681–1700 ==
Year	War	Battle	Loc.	Date(s)	Description
1681		Battle of Katole	(Angola)	4 Sep	Portuguese victory over the Kingdom of Matamba.
1682		Moscow uprising of 1682	(Russia)	11 May – Oct	Streltsy revolt against Naryshkin family, Ivan V installed as tsar and Sophia Alekseyevna as his Regent, relegation of Peter I to second position.
1682	French-Algerian War	First Bombardment of Algiers	(Algeria)	July—Aug	French bombing of Algiers.
1682	Ahom-Mughal conflicts	Battle of Itakhuli	(India)	Aug	Ahom Kingdom victory over the Mughal Empire.
1682	Maratha-Mysore War	Battle of Trichinopoly	(India)	Late 1682	Maratha victory against Mysoreans.
1683	French-Algerian War	Second Bombardment of Algiers	(Algeria)	June—July	The French bomb Algiers, freeing French captives.
1683	Ming-Qing transition	Battle of Penghu	(Taiwan)	10–16 July	Qing dynasty defeats and annexes the Kingdom of Tungning, the last Ming Dynasty remnant state.
1683	Great Turkish War, Ottoman-Habsburg wars and Polish-Ottoman War	Battle of Vienna	(Austria)	2 Sep	An Imperial-Polish army defeats an Ottoman army and lifts the siege of Vienna.
1683	Great Turkish War, Ottoman-Habsburg wars and Polish-Ottoman War	Battle of Párkány	(Slovakia)	7–9 Oct	An Imperial-Polish army defeats the Ottomans.
1683	Mughal–Maratha Wars	Battle of Kalyan	(India)	1683—1684	Mughal victory over the Marathas.
1684	Great Turkish War	Siege of Visegrád	(Hungary)	16–18 June	Holy Roman Empire captures Visegrád.
1684	Great Turkish War	Battle of Vác	(Hungary)	27 June	Holy Roman Empire defeats the Ottoman Empire.
1684	Great Turkish War	First Battle of Buda	(Hungary)	14 July—30 Oct	Holy Roman Empire attempts to siege Buda, but fails.
1684	Morean War and Great Turkish War	Siege of Santa Maura	(Greece)	21 July—6 Aug	Venetian forces successfully capture Castle of Santa Maura from the Ottoman Empire.
1685	Mughal–Bijapur Wars	Siege of Bijapur	(India)	March 1685 – 12 Sep 1686	Mughals annex all territory under the Adil Shahi dynasty.
1685	Great Turkish War	Battle on Vrtijeljka	(Montenegro)	7 May	Ottomans capture Cetinje from Montenegro. Montenegro was aided by Venice.
1685	Monmouth Rebellion	Battle of Sedgemoor	(England)	6 July	James II's forces defeat those of the Monmouth, ending the Monmouth Rebellion.
1685	Great Turkish War	Battle of Eperjes	(Slovakia)	11 Aug	Holy Roman Empire defeats the Principality of Upper Hungary.
1685	Great Turkish War	Battle of Kassa	(Slovakia)	18 Oct	Holy Roman Empire defeats Ottomans.
1686	Great Turkish War	Battle of Buda	(Hungary)	18 June—9 Sep	The forces of the Holy League of 1684 liberate Buda from Ottoman Turkish rule, starting the Ottoman loss of Hungary.
1686	Great Turkish War	Siege of Hamburg	(Germany)	20 Aug—10 Sep	With the help of the Holy Roman Empire and Sweden, Hamburg withstands an invasion by Denmark–Norway and France.
1686	Hill States-Sikh Wars	Battle of Bhangani	(India)	18 Sep	Sikh victory over 16 Hill States, including Bilaspur, the Garhwal Kingdom, Kangra State, Guler State, Nalagarh, Siba State and Jaswan. Occurred 1686 or 1688.
1686	Great Turkish War	Siege of Pécs	(Hungary)	14–22 Oct	Austrians capture Pécs from the Ottoman Empire.
1687	Deccan wars	Siege of Golconda	(India)	Jan—22 Sep	Mughal emperor Aurangzeb annexes Qutb Shahi dynasty.
1687	Great Turkish War	Second Battle of Mohács	(Hungary)	12 Aug	Holy Roman Empire under Lorraine defeats Ottomans.
1687	Morean War	Siege of Athens	(Greece)	23–29 Sep	Venetians temporarily take Athens from Ottomans before being forced to retreat. Major damage to the Parthenon.
1687	Russo-Turkish War	Crimean campaigns of 1687 and 1689	(Ukraine)	1687, 1689	Crimeans retain independence, but Ottoman expansion versus Russia fails.
1688	French-Algerian War	Third Bombardment of Algiers	(Algeria)	26 June	French bomb Algiers after Algerian pirates broke a treaty.
1688	Morean War	Siege of Negroponte	(Greece)	13 July—21 Oct	Venice fails to capture Negroponte from Ottomans.
1688	Great Turkish War, Ottoman-Habsburg wars and Polish-Ottoman War	First Siege of Belgrade	(Serbia)	30 July—6 September	Holy Roman Empire captures Belgrade from the Ottoman Empire.
1688	Hill States-Sikh Wars	Battle of Bhangani	(India)	18 Sep	Sikh victory over 16 Hill States, including Bilaspur, the Garhwal Kingdom, Kangra State, Guler State, Nalagarh, Siba State and Jaswan. Occurred 1686 or 1688.
1688	Nine Years' War	Siege of Philippsburg	(Germany)	27 Sep—30 Oct	France captures Philippsburg from Spires. Philippsburg was defended by German troops.
1688	Nine Years' War	Battle of Fort Albany	(Canada)	Sep	French forces engage and defeat British relief forces in Hudson Bay.
1688	Glorious Revolution	Battle of Reading	(England)	9 Dec	William III of England's forces defeat those of James II in the only battle of the Revolution.
1689	Williamite War	Capture of Bandon	(Republic of Ireland)	Feb—March	Jacobites capture Bandon.
1689	Nine Years' War	Battle of Uerdingen	(Germany)	12 March	The Netherlands and Brandenburg-Prussia defeat France.
1689	Williamite War	Break of Dromore	(Northern Ireland)	14 March	Jacobites defeat the Williamites.
1689	Williamite War	Siege of Derry	(Northern Ireland)	18 April—1 Aug	Jacobites fail to capture Derry from the Williamites.
1689	Nine Years' War and Williamite War	Battle of Bantry Bay	(Republic of Ireland)	11 May	France defeats the English fleet near the Irish southern coast.
1689	Anglo-French Wars	Siege of Mainz	(Germany)	26 July—8 Sep	Holy Roman Empire recaptures Mainz from France.
1689	Jacobite rising of 1689	Battle of Killiecrankie	(Scotland)	27 July	Jacobites defeat the Williamites.
1689	Williamite War	Battle of Newtownbutler	(Northern Ireland)	31 July	Williamites defeat the Jacobites.
1689	Nine Years' War	Siege of Bonn	(Germany)	July—12 Oct	Brandenburg-Prussia and the Netherlands capture Bonn from the Cologne. French troops help Cologne defend its capital but ultimately fail.
1689	Williamite War	Siege of Carrickfergus	(Northern Ireland)	20–27 Aug	Williamite victory over the Jacobites.
1689	Jacobite rising of 1689	Battle of Dunkeld	(Scotland)	21 Aug	Williamite victory over the Jacobites.
1689	Nine Years' War	Battle of Walcourt	(Belgium)	25 Aug	An Anglo-Dutch force defeats a French army.
1689	Great Turkish War	Battle of Batočina	(Serbia)	29–30 Aug	Holy Roman Empire defeats the Ottoman Empire.
1689	Spanish-Barbary Wars	Siege of Larache	(Morocco)	Aug—11 Nov	Morocco takes Larache from Spain.
1689	Great Turkish War	Battle of Niš	(Serbia)	24 Sep	Holy Roman Empire captures Niš from the Ottoman Empire.
1689	Great Turkish War	Austrian campaign for Skopje	(North Macedonia)	26 Oct	Austrians burn down Skopje.
1689	Great Turkish War	Battle of Egri Palanka	(North Macedonia)	Oct	Confrontation between the Macedonian Voivode against the Ottoman Empire.
1689	Karposh's rebellion	Karposh's rebellion	(North Macedonia)	Oct	Ottomans quell Christian anti-Ottoman rebellion.
1689	Williamite War	Raid on Newry	(Northern Ireland)	24 Nov	Williamite victory over France and the Jacobites.
1689		Battle of Raigarh	(India)		Mughals conquer fortress from the Marathas, but Rajaram I escapes.
1690	Williamite War	Battle of Cavan	(Republic of Ireland)	11 Feb	Williamites defeat the Jacobites.
1690	Jacobite rising of 1689	Battle of Cromdale	(Scotland)	30 April—1 May	Williamites defeat the Jacobites.
1690	King William's War	Battle of Chedabucto	(Canada)	3 June	England defeats France.
1690	Nine Years' War	Battle of Fleurus	(Belgium)	1 July	French troops under Montmorency, defeat a coalition formed by England, Spain, the Dutch Republic and the Holy Roman Empire.
1690	Williamite War and Nine Years' War	Battle of the Boyne	(Republic of Ireland)	1 July	William of Orange defeats James II of England.
1690	Nine Years' War; War of the League of Augsburg	Battle of Beachy Head	(England)	10 July	French defeat the English fleet under command of Torrington.
1690	Williamite War	First Siege of Athlone	(Republic of Ireland)	17–24 July	Williamites and the Netherlands fail to capture Athlone from the Jacobites and France.
1690	Williamite War	Capture of Waterford	(Republic of Ireland)	July	Williamite victory over the Jacobites.
1690	Great Turkish War	Battle of Zernest	(Romania)	11 Aug	Ottomans halt Holy Roman Empire forces from expanding.
1690	Nine Years' War	Battle of Staffarda	(Italy)	18 Aug	French defeat Spaniards and Savoyans.
1690	Williamite War	Siege of Limerick	(Republic of Ireland)	Aug—Sep	Williamites fail to capture Limerick from the Jacobites and France.
1690	Great Turkish War and Morean War	Battle of Mytilene	(Greece)	8 Sep	Inconclusive naval battle between Venice and the Ottoman Empire.
1690	Williamite War	Siege of Cork	(Republic of Ireland)	Sep	Williamite victory over the Jacobites.
1690	Mughal–Maratha Wars	Siege of Jinji	(India)	Sep 1690 – 8 Jan 1698	Marathas and Madurai Nayaks defeat Mughals, but Mughals capture the fort.
1690	Great Turkish War and Ottoman–Habsburg wars	Second Siege of Belgrade	(Serbia)	2–8 Oct	Ottomans recapture Belgrade from Austria.
1690	King William's War	Battle of Quebec	(Canada)	16–24 Oct	British victory over France.
1691	Nine Years' War	Siege of Mons	(Belgium)	15 March—10 April	France captures Mons from Spain.
1691	Williamite War	Second Siege of Athlone	(Republic of Ireland)	June	The Williamites and the Netherlands capture Athlone from the Jacobites and France.
1691	Williamite War and Nine Years' War	Battle of Aughrim	(Republic of Ireland)	22 July	Jacobites defeat the Williamites in the bloodiest battle in Irish history.
1691	King William's War and Beaver Wars	Battle of La Prairie	(Canada)	11 Aug	French repulse British and First Nations' attack on this settlement.
1691	Great Turkish War	Battle of Slankamen	(Serbia)	19 Aug	Louis of Baden defeats Ottoman Turks.
1691	Williamite War	Siege of Limerick	(Republic of Ireland)	Aug—Oct	Last major battle of the Williamite War; Treaty of Limerick.
1691	Nine Years' War	Battle of Leuze	(Belgium)	18 Sep	French cavalry victory against a superior Anglo-Dutch force.
1691	Mughal–Sikh wars	Battle of Nadaun	(India)		Rajput-Sikh victory over the Mughal Empire.
1692	Nine Years' War	Siege of Namur	(Belgium)	25 May—1 July	Louis XIV takes Namur from a coalition of Spanish, Dutch and Imperial troops.
1692	Nine Years' War	Battles of Barfleur and La Hougue	(France)	29 May	French lose 15 ships to England and the Netherlands.
1692	Conflicts between the Regency of Algiers and Morocco	Battle of Moulouya	(Algeria)	May—June	Ottoman Algeria defeats Morocco in a failed Alaouite Moroccan attempt to conquer Tlemcen.
1692	Nine Years' War	Battle of Steenkerque	(Belgium)	3 Aug	French victory against England, Scotland, Denmark and the United Provinces.
1692	King William's War	Battle of Placentia	(Canada)	16–21 Sep	France defeats England.
1693	Nine Years' War	Battle of Lagos	(Portugal)	27 June	Comte de Tourville avenges La Hougue by defeating the Anglo-Dutch fleet.
1693	Second Brotherhood	Battle of Cela de Núñez	(Spain)	15 July	Spain defeats the rebels of the Camperols during the uprising.
1693	Conflicts between the Regency of Algiers and Morocco	Siege of Oran	(Algeria)	20–24 July	Moroccan troops fail to take Oran from Spain.
1693	Nine Years' War	Battle of Neerwinden	(Belgium)	29 July	Luxembourg defeats England, the Netherlands and Spain.
1693	Great Turkish War	Third Siege of Belgrade	(Serbia)	31 July	A Habsburg army fails to take the city.
1693	Nine Years' War	Battle of Marsaglia	(Italy)	4 Oct	France defeats Savoy and Spain.
1694		Battle of Daman	(India)	23 Mar	A Portuguese fleet defeats Oman.
1694	Nine Years' War	Battle of Torroella	(Spain)	27 May	French Navy defeats Spain.
1694	Nine Years' War	Battle of Texel	(Netherlands)	29 June	France wins a naval battle over the Netherlands.
1694	Polish–Ottoman War	Battle of Hodów	(Ukraine)	11 July	Poland-Lithuania defeats the Crimean Khanate.
1694	Nine Years' War	Battle of Camaret	(France)	18 July	Anglo-Dutch attack on the French port of Brest with the intention of seizing and destroying it fails.
1694	Tunisian-Algerian War	Siege of Tunis	(Tunisia)	Aug—Nov	Tunis is inducted into Algiers.
1694	Great Turkish War and Polish–Ottoman War	Battle of Ustechko	(Ukraine)	6 Oct	Poland-Lithuania defeats the Crimean Khanate and the Ottoman Empire.
1695	Morean War	Battle of the Oinousses Islands	(Greece)	9–15 Feb	The Ottoman navy defeats Venice.
1695	Nine Years' War	Battle of Sant Esteve d'en Bas	(Spain)	10 March	Spain defeats France.
1695	Russo-Turkish War	Azov campaigns	(Russia)	Spring 1695 – 19 July 1696	Multiple Russian campaigns to capture the Turkish Azov Fortress.
1695	Nine Years' War	Siege of Namur	(Belgium)	2 July—4 Sep	William III of Orange and van Coehoorn recapture Namur, commanding a coalition of England, Scotland, the Netherlands and German states against France.
1695	Great Turkish War	Battle of Lugos	(Romania)	25 Sep	The Ottoman Empire defeats Germany.
1696	Spanish colonisation of the Americas	Battle of Ch'ich'	(Guatemala)	2 Feb	Itza defeat Spanish.
1696	Nine Years' War	Battle of Dogger Bank	At sea	17 June	France defeats the Netherlands in a naval battle.
1696	Great Turkish War	Battle of Ulaş	(Serbia) / (Romania)	20–26 Aug	Ottoman Empire defeats Austria.
1696	Morean War	Battle of Andros	(Greece)	22 Aug	Indecisive battle between a Venetian-Papal navy and an Ottoman navy.
1696	Great Turkish War	Battle of Cenei	(Romania)	26 Aug	Ottoman victory over Austria.
1697	Nine Years' War	Siege of Ath	(Belgium)	16 May—5 June	France captures Ath from Spain.
1697	Nine Years' War	Siege of Barcelona	(Spain)	12 June—12 Aug	France captures Barcelona from Spain.
1697	Great Turkish War	Action of 6 July 1697	At sea	6 July	Venetian fleet hunts down Turkish fleet.
1697	King William's War	Battle of Hudson's Bay	(Canada)	5 Sep	France defeats England.
1697	Great Turkish War and Ottoman-Habsburg wars	Battle of Zenta	(Serbia)	11 Sep	Prince Eugene of Savoy defeats Ottoman Turkish forces.
1697	Spanish colonisation of the Americas	Siege of Nojpetén	(Guatemala)		Spanish take Itzan city of Nojpetén.
1698		Streltsy uprising	(Russia)	6–18 June	Revolt crushes by Peter the Great.
1698	Great Turkish War and Polish-Ottoman War	Battle of Podhajce	(Ukraine)	8–9 Sep	Poland-Lithuania defeats the Ottoman Empire, the Crimean Khanate and the Budjak Horde.
1698	Great Turkish War and Morean War	Battle of Samothrace	(Greece)	20 Sep	Inconclusive naval battle between Venice and the Ottoman Empire.
1699	Deccan wars	Battle of Satara	(India)	1699—21 April 1700	Mughal victory over the Marathans.
1699	Maghrebi war	Constantine campaign	(Algeria)	1699—1700	Tunisia captures most of Eastern Algeria.
1700	Great Northern War	First Siege of Riga	(Latvia)	22 Feb	
1700	Great Northern War	Siege of Tönning	(Germany)	March—Aug	Failed siege by Swedes.
1700	Great Northern War	Battle of Reinbek	(Germany)	19 May	Lifts the Siege of Tönning.
1700	Great Northern War	Second Siege of Riga	(Latvia)	15 June	
1700	Great Northern War	Landing at Humlebæk	(Denmark)	24 July	First Swedish offensive of the war.
1700	Maghrebi war	Battle of Jouami' al-Ulama	(Algeria)	3 Oct	Algerians defeat Tunisians.
1700	Great Northern War	Battle of Varja	(Estonia)	27 Oct	First battle in Swedish Estonia during the war.
1700	Lithuanian Civil War	Battle of Valkininkai	(Lithuania)	18 Nov	Sapieha clan is defeated by the opposing noble coalition.
1700	Great Northern War	Battle of Narva	(Estonia)	30 Nov	Charles XII of Sweden defeats Russians.
1700	Mughal-Sikh Wars	First Battle of Anandpur	(India)		Sikh victory over Mughals.

== 1701–1720 ==
Year	War	Battle	Loc.	Date(s)	Description
1701	Great Northern War	Battle of Petschora	(Russia)	12 Feb	Swedes defeat Russians.
1701	Maghrebi war	Battle of Chelif	(Algeria)	28 April	Ottoman Algerian victory over Morocco.
1701	War of the Spanish Succession	Battle of Carpi	(Italy)	9 July	Austrian victory over France.
1701	Great Northern War	Crossing of the Düna	(Latvia)	19 July	Charles XII crosses the Düna River during a battle against Saxony, the Duchy of Courland and Russia.
1701	War of the Spanish Succession	Battle of Chiari	(Italy)	1 Sept	Austrian victory over France, Spain and Savoy.
1701	Great Northern War	Battle of Rauge	(Estonia)	4 Sept	Swedes defeat Russians.
1701	Great Northern War	Battle of Tryškiai	(Lithuania)	4–5 Dec	Swedish victory over Poland-Lithuania.
1701	Deccan wars	Battle of Khelna	(India)	26 Dec 1701 – 6 June 1702	Mughal victory after a three-month siege over the Marathas.
1701	Great Northern War	Battle of Erastfer	(Estonia)	29 Dec	First significant Russian victory over Sweden in the Great Northern War.
1702	War of the Spanish Succession	Battle of Cremona	(Italy)	1 Feb	Indecisive action between Austria and France.
1702	Great Northern War	Battle of Darsūniškis	(Lithuania)	13 March	Lithuanian victory over Swedes.
1702	Great Northern War	Battle of Vilnius	(Lithuania)	5 April	Swedes capture Vilnius from Poland-Lithuania.
1702	War of the Spanish Succession	Siege of Kaiserswerth	(Germany)	18 April—15 June	Austria, Prussia and the Netherlands capture Kaiserswerth from Cologne. Kaiserswerth was defended by France.
1702	War of the Spanish Succession	Assault on Nijmegen	(Netherlands)	10–11 June	The Netherlands and England successfully repulse a French assault on Nijmegen.
1702	War of the Spanish Succession	Siege of Landau	(Germany)	16 June—12 Sep	Austria captures Landau from France.
1702	Great Northern War	Battle of Klissow	(Poland)	19 July	Sweden defeats a combined Saxon and Polish army.
1702	War of the Spanish Succession	Battle of Santa Vittoria	(Italy)	26 July	French victory over Austria.
1702	Great Northern War	Battle of Hummelshof	(Estonia)	30 July	Russia defeats Sweden.
1702	War of the Spanish Succession	Battle of Luzzara	(Italy)	15 Aug	Inconclusive battle between Austria and a French-Savoyard coalition.
1702	War of the Spanish Succession	Action of August 1702	(Colombia)	19–25 Aug	Inconclusive naval battle between France and England.
1702	War of the Spanish Succession	Battle of Cádiz	(Spain)	23 Aug—30 Sep	Bourbon Spain defeats England and the Netherlands.
1702	Great Northern War	Siege of Nöteborg	(Russia)	26 Sep	Major Russian victory over Sweden.
1702	War of the Spanish Succession	Battle of Friedlingen	(Germany)	14 Oct	France defeats Holy Roman Empire.
1702	War of the Spanish Succession	Battle of Vigo Bay	(Spain)	23 Oct	English and Dutch forces capture a defended harbor and part of the silver from a Spanish-French treasure fleet.
1702	Queen Anne's War	Battle of Flint River	(United States)	Oct	England and the Apalachicola people defeat pro-Bourbon Spain and the Apalachee.
1702	Queen Anne's War	Siege of St. Augustine	(United States)	10 Nov—30 Dec	England fails to capture St. Augustine, Florida from Spain.
1702		Battle of the Yi	(Uruguay)		Battle between Spanish Argentina and indigenous groups.
1702	Mughal-Sikh Wars and Hill States-Sikh Wars	Battle of Basoli	(India)		Sikhs defeat Mughals.
1702	Mughal-Sikh Wars and Hill States-Sikh Wars	First Battle of Chamkaur	(India)		Precursor to Battle of Chamkaur; Sikh victory over the Mughal Empire.
1703	Palej Uprising	Battle of Werbicze	(Ukraine)	4 Feb	Polish-Lithuanian victory over rebel Cossacks.
1703	Great Northern War	Battle of Saločiai	(Lithuania)	18 March	Swedish victory over Poland-Lithuania and Russia.
1703	War of the Spanish Succession	Siege of Guadeloupe	(France)	19 March—15 May	England fails to conquer Guadeloupe from France.
1703	War of the Spanish Succession	Battle of Schmidmühlen	(Germany)	28 March	Bavaria defeats Austria.
1703	Great Northern War	Battle of Pułtusk	(Poland)	20 April	Swedish victory over Saxony.
1703	Janissary revolts	Naqib al-Ashraf revolt	(Palestine)	May -October 1705	Naqib al-ashraf Muhammad Al Husayni al-Wafa'i revolted against Ottoman rule with the help of Janissaries and bedouins,Revolt suppressed .
1703	War of the Spanish Succession	Battle of Cap de la Roque	(Portugal)	22 May	France defeats the Netherlands in a naval battle.
1703	Great Northern War	Siege of Thorn	(Poland)	May—14 Oct	Swedes capture Toruń from Poland-Lithuania, defended by Saxon troops of king Augustus II the Strong of Poland, elector of Saxony.
1703	War of the Spanish Succession	Battle of Ekeren	(Belgium)	30 June	Battle between the Netherlands and a French-Spanish coalition. Both sides claimed victory.
1703	Great Northern War	Battle of Systerbäck	(Russia)	8 July	Russians defeat Swedes.
1703	Queen Anne's War	Battle of Falmouth	(United States)	10–19 Aug	France defeats England.
1703	War of the Spanish Succession	First Battle of Höchstädt	(Germany)	30 Sep	French and Bavarian victory over Austria.
1703	War of the Spanish Succession	Battle of Speyerbach	(Germany)	15 Nov	France defeats Hesse-Kassel and the Palatinate.
1703	Rákóczi's War of Independence	Battle of Zvolen	(Slovakia)	15 Nov	Kuruc-French victory over Austria, Denmark-Norway, Vojvodian Serbs and Hungarian royalists.
1703	Janissary revolts	Edirne Incident	(Turkey)		Mustafa II removed from power .
1703	Deccan wars	Battle of Raigarh	(India)	1703—1704	Mughals reconquer Rajgad Fort from the Marathas.
1704	Mughal-Sikh Wars and Hill States-Sikh Wars	First Battle of Anandpur	(India)	Early 1704	Sikh victory over the Mughal Empire.
1704		Battle of Surat	(India)	2 Feb	A Portuguese fleet defeats Oman.
1704	Queen Anne's War	Raid on Deerfield	(United States)	29 Feb	French and Iroquois defeat and massacre British.
1704		Siege of Wagingera	(India)	27 March	Mughal victory over the Ramoshi.
1704	Rákóczi's War of Independence	Battle of Biskupice	(Slovakia)	21 April	Hungarian rebel victory over Austria.
1704	War of the Spanish Succession	Landing at Barcelona	(Spain)	27–30 May	Failed attempt by England, the Netherlands and pro-Habsburg Spain to capture Barcelona from Bourbons.
1704	Mughal-Sikh Wars and Hill States-Sikh Wars	Second Siege of Anandpur	(India)	May—14 Dec	Mughal victory over the Sikhs.
1704	Rákóczi's War of Independence	Battle of Koroncó	(Hungary)	13 June	Austrians repress Kuruc rebels.
1704	Great Northern War	Battle of Wesenberg	(Estonia)	15 June	Russians capture Rakvere from Sweden.
1704	Queen Anne's War	Raid on Grand Pré	(Canada)	24–26 June	English defeat Miꞌkmaq.
1704	Great Northern War	Second Battle of Narva	(Estonia)	27 June	Russia captures Narva from Sweden. Ends in Treaty of Narva.
1704	War of the Spanish Succession	Battle of Schellenberg	(Germany)	2 July	Marlborough defeats French and Bavarian forces.
1704	Great Northern War	Battle of Jakobstadt	(Latvia)	25 July	Swedish victory over Poland-Lithuania and Russia.
1704	War of the Spanish Succession	Capture of Gibraltar	(Gibraltar)	1–4 Aug	British and Dutch capture Gibraltar.
1704	Great Northern War	Battle of Poznań	(Poland)	8 Aug	Swedish victory over Saxony and Poland-Lithuania.
1704	War of the Spanish Succession	Battle of Blenheim	(Germany)	14 Aug	Marlborough defeats French and Bavarian forces.
1704	War of the Spanish Succession	Battle of Málaga	(Spain)	24 Aug	Indecisive naval battle between an Anglo-Dutch coalition and France.
1704	Great Northern War	Storming of Lemberg	(Ukraine)	6 Sep	Swedish Empire defeats Poland-Lithuania.
1704	War of the Spanish Succession	Twelfth siege of Gibraltar	(Gibraltar)	Sep 1704 – 3 May 1705	Pro-Bourbon Spain and France fail to capture Gibraltar from England, the Netherlands, Austria and pro-Habsburg Spain.
1704	Great Northern War	Battle of Poniec	(Poland)	28 Oct	Inconclusive battle between Sweden and Saxony.
1704	Mughal-Sikh Wars and Hill States-Sikh Wars	Battle of Sarsa	(India)	21 Dec	Mughals defeat Sikhs trying to cross Sarsa river.
1704	War of the Spanish Succession	Siege of Colonia del Sacramento	(Uruguay)	Late 1704 – Feb 1705	Spain captures Colónia do Sacramento from Portugal.
1704	Deccan wars	Battle of Torna	(India)		Mughal victory over the Marathas.
1705	War of the Spanish Succession	Siege of Nice	(France)	15 March 1705 – 4 Jan 1706	France captures Nice from Savoy.
1705	War of the Spanish Succession	Battle of Cabrita Point	(Gibraltar)	21 March	England, Portugal and the Netherlands defeat France and Spain in a naval battle that ends the twelfth siege of Gibraltar.
1705	War of the Spanish Succession	Battle of Elixheim	(Belgium)	18 July	Allied victory. England, Scotland, the Netherlands and Austria defeat France.
1705	Great Northern War	Battle of Gemauerthof	(Latvia)	26 July	Sweden defeats Russia.
1705	War of the Spanish Succession	Battle on the Congost	(Spain)	29 July	Pro-Habsburg Catalans defeat a pro-Bourbon Spanish army.
1705	Great Northern War	Battle of Warsaw	(Poland)	31 July	Sweden defeats Saxon and Polish troops near Warsaw.
1705	War of the Spanish Succession	Battle of Cassano	(Italy)	16 Aug	Inconclusive battle of France versus Austria, Prussia and Savoy.
1705	Great Northern War	First Battle of Hogland	At sea	20 Aug	Swedes capture Hogland Island from Russia.
1705	War of the Spanish Succession	Battle of Montjuïc	(Spain)	13–17 Sep	Grand Alliance of Austria, England-Scotland, the Netherlands and Catalonia defeats Spain and France.
1705	War of the Spanish Succession	Siege of Barcelona	(Spain)	14 Sep—19 Oct	England, Austria, Portugal, the Netherlands and pro-Habsburg Spain capture Barcelona from pro-Bourbon Spain.
1705	Great Northern War	Battle of Praga	(Poland)	14 Oct	Swedish victory over Poland-Lithuania, Saxony and Russia.
1705	Rákóczi's War of Independence	Battle of Zsibó	(Romania)	15 Nov	Austria, Denmark-Norway and Vojvodian Serbs defeat Kuruc and French forces.
1705	Mughal-Sikh Wars and Hill States-Sikh Wars	Battle of Chamkaur	(India)	6 Dec	Mughal victory over the Khalsa Sikhs.
1705	Rákóczi's War for Independence	Battle of Saint Gotthard	(Austria) / (Hungary)	13 Dec	Kuruc-Hungarian victory over Austria.
1705	Bavarian People's Uprising	Sendling's night of murder	(Germany)	25 Dec	Austria massacres an army of Bavarian peasants during the Austrian occupation of Bavaria.
1705	Mughal-Sikh Wars	Battle of Muktsar	(India)	29 Dec	Wazir Khan of the Mughal Empire is defeated by Khalsa Sikhs.
1706	Great Northern War	First Battle of Grodno	(Belarus)	15 Jan	Sweden defeats Russia. Swedes capture and hold Grodno for two years.
1706	Great Northern War	Battle of Fraustadt	(Poland)	13 Feb	Sweden defeats Saxony.
1706	Great Northern War	Battle of Valkininkai	(Lithuania)	24 Feb	Swedish victory over Poland-Lithuania and Russia.
1706	War of the Spanish Succession	Siege of Barcelona	(Spain)	3 April	Allied victory. England, Austria, the Netherlands and Spanish troops loyal to the Habsburg dynasty maintain Barcelona from France and Spanish troops loyal to the Bourbon dynasty.
1706	War of the Spanish Succession	Battle of Calcinato	(Italy)	19 April	French-Bourbon Spanish victory over Austria and Prussia.
1706	Great Northern War	Battle of Kletsk	(Belarus)	19 April	Swedish victory over Russia.
1706	War of the Spanish Succession	Battle of Ramillies	(Belgium)	23 May	Marlborough, commanding an army of England, Scotland and the Netherlands, defeats the French.
1706	War of the Spanish Succession	Siege of Ostend	(Belgium)	15 June	Allied victory. The Netherlands and England capture Ostend from France and Bourbon Spain.
1706	War of the Spanish Succession	Battle of Murcia	(Spain)	4 Sep	Bourbon Spanish victory over England and the Netherlands.
1706	War of the Spanish Succession	Battle of Turin	(Italy)	7 Sep	French and Spanish fail to take the capital of Savoy, which was aided by Austria and Prussia.
1706	War of the Spanish Succession	Battle of Castiglione	(Italy)	8 Sep	French defeat Hessians.
1706	War of the Spanish Succession	Battle of El Albujón	(Spain)	21 Sep	Spanish loyal to Philip V of Spain defeat forces loyal to Charles VI.
1706	Queen Anne's War	Lefebvre's Charles Town expedition	(United States)	Sep	French fail to capture Charleston, South Carolina from England.
1706	Great Northern War	Battle of Kalisz	(Poland)	29 Oct	Sweden and the Warsaw Confederation are defeated by Saxony and Russia.
1706	War of the Spanish Succession	Battle of Santa Cruz de Tenerife	(Spain)	6 Nov	Spain defeats small British fleet.
1707	War of the Spanish Succession	Battle of Biniatap	(Spain)	5 Jan	Pro-Bourbon Spain and France defeat pro-Habsburg Spain.
1707	War of the Spanish Succession	Battle of Almansa	(Spain)	25 April	French and Spanish forces defeat a British and Portuguese army.
1707	War of the Spanish Succession	Action of 2 May 1707	(England)	2 May	French victory over Great Britain in a naval battle.
1707	War of the Spanish Succession	Siege of Xàtiva	(Spain)	8 May—6 June	Castile and France capture Xàtiva from Aragon and Great Britain.
1707	Queen Anne's War	Siege of Port Royal	(Canada)	6 June—1 Sep	Two failed attempts by Great Britain to conquer Port-Royal from France.
1707	Mughal Civil War	Battle of Jajau	(India)	20 June	Conclusion of a Mughal war of succession.
1707	War of the Spanish Succession	Siege of Toulon	(France)	29 July—21 Aug	Austria, Savoy and Great Britain fail to capture Toulon from France.
1707	Queen Anne's War	Siege of Pensacola	(United States)	12 Aug—30 Nov	Two failed attempts by the Muscogee in British service to capture Pensacola, Florida from Spain.
1707	War of the Spanish Succession	Battle at The Lizard	(England)	21 Oct	French victory over Great Britain in a naval battle.
1707	Spanish-Barbary Wars	Siege of Oran	(Algeria)	1 Nov 1707 – 4 April 1708	Ottoman Algeria captures Oran from Spain.
1708	Great Northern War	Second Battle of Grodno	(Belarus)	27 Jan	Swedes recapture Grodno from Russia.
1708	War of the Spanish Succession	Wager's Action	(Colombia)	8 June	Great Britain forces the Spanish treasure fleet to retreat to Cartagena.
1708	Great Northern War	Battle of Holowczyn	(Belarus)	4 July	Swedish defeat two Russian forces.
1708	War of the Spanish Succession	Battle of Oudenarde	(Netherlands)	11 July	Duke of Marlborough and Prince Eugene of Savoy defeat French and besiege Lille.
1708	Rákóczi's War of Independence	Battle of Trenčín	(Hungary)	3 Aug	Habsburg push back Kurucs.
1708	War of the Spanish Succession	Siege of Lille	(France)	12 Aug—10 Dec	The Netherlands, Great Britain and Austria capture Lille from France.
1708	Great Northern War	Battle of the Neva	(Russia)	29 Aug	Swedes defeat Russians.
1708	Queen Anne's War	Raid on Haverhill	(United States)	29 Aug	French-Algonquian victory over Great Britain.
1708	Great Northern War	Battle of Malatitze	(Russia)	10 Sep	Skirmish between Russia and Sweden.
1708	Great Northern War	Battle of Rajovka	(Russia)	20 Sep	Skirmish between Russia and Sweden.
1708	Great Northern War	Battle of Koporye	(Russia)	27 Sep	Swedish victory over Russia.
1708	Great Northern War	Battle of Lesnaya	(Belarus)	28 Sep	Swedish routed by the Russians after snowstorm starts.
1708	War of the Spanish Succession	Battle of Wijnendale	(Belgium)	28 Sep	Webb defeats the French near Torhout who wanted to stop the siege of Rijsel.
1708	Great Northern War	Evacuation of Kolkanpää	(Russia)	16 Oct	Russians push back Swedes.
1708	Great Northern War	Sack of Baturyn	(Ukraine)	27 Oct—2 Nov	Russians take Cossack Baturyn and massacre its population.
1708	Great Northern War	Battle of Desna	(Russia)	31 Oct	Swedish victory over Russia.
1708	Great Northern War	Battle of Koniecpol	(Poland)	21 Nov	Supporters of Augustus II the Strong defeat supporters of Stanisław Leszczyński.
1708	War of the Spanish Succession	Siege of Alicante	(Spain)	3 Dec 1708 – 20 April 1709	Pro-Bourbon Spain and France capture Alicante from Aragon and Great Britain.
1708	Great Northern War	Siege of Veprik	(Ukraine)	23 Dec	Swedish forces capture Vepryk from Russia.
1708	Conflicts between the Regency of Algiers and Morocco	Laghouat Expedition	(Algeria)	1708—1713	Morocco gains control of towns near Laghouat.
1709	Queen Anne's War	Battle of St. John's	(Canada)	1 Jan	French take control of St. John's, Newfoundland and Labrador from Great Britain.
1709	Great Northern War	Battle of Oposhnya	(Ukraine)	28 Jan	Swedish victory over Russia.
1709	Great Northern War	Battle of Krasnokutsk–Gorodnoye	(Ukraine)	10 Feb	Swedish victory over Russia.
1709	Kongo Civil War	Battle of São Salvador	(Angola)	15 Feb	Orthodox Kongolese Catholics defeat Antonian Catholics.
1709	Great Northern War	Battle of Sokolki	(Ukraine)	12 April	Sweden lets the Russian army escape; precursor to Battle of Poltava.
1709	War of the Spanish Succession	Battle of La Gudiña	(Portugal)	7 May	Spain defeats Portugal and Great Britain.
1709	Queen Anne's War	Battle of Fort Albany	(Canada)	26 June	Great Britain defeats France.
1709	Great Northern War	Battle of Poltava	(Ukraine)	28 June	Peter I of Russia defeats Charles XII of Sweden.
1709	Great Northern War	Surrender at Perevolochna	(Ukraine)	30 June	The entire Swedish navy surrenders to the Russians.
1709	War of the Spanish Succession	Battle of Malplaquet	(France)	11 Sep	Prince Eugene of Savoy and Duke of Marlborough defeat the French in the largest battle of the 18th century, though at a terrible cost.
1709	Mughal-Sikh Wars	Battle of Samana	(India)	26 Nov	Sikhs defeat the Mughal Empire.
1709	Mughal-Sikh Wars	Battle of Sonipat	(India)		Sikhs defeat the Mughal Empire.
1710	Great Northern War	Battle of Helsingborg	(Sweden)	10 March	Sweden defeats invading Danish force.
1710	Great Northern War	Siege of Viborg	(Russia)	March	Russians capture Vyborg from Sweden.
1710	Mughal-Sikh Wars	Battle of Chappar Chiri	(India)	12 May	Sikhs defeat the Mughal Empire. Sikhs control from Lahore to Delhi.
1710	Mughal-Sikh Wars	Siege of Sirhind	(India)	14 May	Sikhs capture Sirhind from the Mughal Empire and establish it as the Sikh capital.
1710	Great Northern War	Capitulation of Estonia and Livonia	(Estonia) / (Latvia)	15 July	Swedish Estonia and Livonia become incorporated into Russia.
1710	War of the Spanish Succession	Battle of Almenar	(Spain)	27 July	Austrian-British-Dutch allies defeat the Spanish.
1710	Mughal-Sikh Wars	Battle of Jalalabad	(India)	July—Aug	Mughals hold Jalalabad against the Sikhs.
1710	War of the Spanish Succession	Battle of Saragossa	(Spain)	20 Aug	Austria, Habsburg Spain, Great Britain, the Netherlands and Portugal defeat Bourbon Spain.
1710	War of the Spanish Succession	First Battle of Rio de Janeiro	(Brazil)	19 Sep	Portugal defeats French incursion.
1710	Great Northern War	Battle of Køge Bay	(Denmark)	24 Sep	Indecisive battle between Sweden and Denmark-Norway.
1710	Queen Anne's War	Siege of Port Royal	(Canada)	5–13 Oct	Great Britain captures Port Royal and Acadia from France.
1710	Mughal-Sikh Wars	Battle of Rahon	(India)	11 Oct	Sikh victory over the Mughal Empire.
1710	War of the Spanish Succession	Battle of Syracuse	(Italy)	9 Nov	France defeats Great Britain in a naval battle.
1710	Russo-Turkish War	Pruth River campaign	(Ukraine) / (Russia)	20 Nov 1710 – 24 June 1713	Ottoman Turks defeat Peter I of Russia.
1710	War of the Spanish Succession	Battle of Brihuega	(Spain)	9 Dec	The Duke of Vendôme surprises and defeats a British force.
1710	War of the Spanish Succession	Battle of Villaviciosa	(Spain)	10 Dec	Decisive victory of a Franco-Spanish army on retreating Austrian, Dutch and Portuguese forces.
1710	Mughal-Sikh Wars	Battle of Lohgarh	(India)	16 Dec	Sikh victory over the Mughal Empire.
1710	Mughal-Sikh Wars	Battle of Sadhaura	(India)		Sikhs capture Sadaura from the Mughal Empire.
1711	Qays–Yaman rivalry	Battle of Ain Dara	(Beirut)	20 March	Battle between the Qaysi and Yamani tribes of Ottoman Druze. Qaysi victory.
1711	Queen Anne's War	First Battle of Bloody Creek	(Canada)	Mid-June	French-allied Native Americans successfully ambush British troops.
1711	War of the Spanish Succession	Siege of Bouchain	(France)	5 Aug—12 Sep	Great Britain, the Netherlands and Austria capture Bouchain from France.
1711	War of the Spanish Succession	Capture of the galleon San Joaquin	(Colombia)	11 Aug	British capture a Spanish ship.
1711	Queen Anne's War	Quebec Expedition	(Canada)	22 Aug	British attack against France fails.
1711	War of the Spanish Succession	Battle of Rio de Janeiro	(Brazil)	12–22 Sep	France defeats Portugal.
1711	Great Northern War	Battle of Wismar	(Germany)	5 Dec	Danish victory over Sweden.
1711	Great Northern War	Siege of Stralsund	(Germany)	1711—24 Dec 1715	Denmark-Norway, Saxony, Russia and Prussia capture Stralsund from Sweden.
1711	Janissary revolts	1711 Karamanli coup	(Libya)		Revolt in Tripolitania led by Ahmed Karamanli against the ruling bey, start of the Karamanli dynasty.
1712	Mughal–Sikh Wars	Battle of Jammu	(India)	22 Jan	Mughals defeat Sikhs.
1712	Slave Revolts in North America	New York Slave Revolt of 1712	(United States)	6 April	Revolt Suppressed
1712	Great Northern War	Battle of Fladstrand	(Denmark)	11 April	Inconclusive battle between Sweden and Denmark-Norway
1712	War of the Spanish Succession	Battle of Denain	(France)	24 July	French defeat Austrians and Dutch.
1712	Toggenburg War	Battle of Villmergen	(Switzerland)	25 July	Bern defeats Lucerne, Schwyz, Unterwalden, the Canton of Uri, Zug and the Freie Ämter.
1712	Great Northern War	Battle of Gadebusch	(Germany)	9 Dec	Sweden defeats Denmark and Saxony.
1712	War of the Spanish Succession	Cassard expedition	(Cape Verde) / (Netherlands)		French voyage to raid the Dutch South American colonial outposts and British colonies.
1713	Great Northern War	Skirmish at Bender	(Moldova)	1 Feb	Ottomans expel Swedes from Moldavia.
1713	Tuscarora War	Battle of Fort Neoheroka	(United States)	20–23 March	Major Tuscarora defeat against the British at Fort Neoheroka.
1713	War of the Spanish Succession	Siege of Landau	(Germany)	11 June—21 Aug	France captures the free imperial city of Landau in der Pfalz from the Holy Roman Empire.
1713	War of the Catalans and War of the Spanish Succession	Battle of Torredembarra	(Spain)	16 July	Pro-Bourbon Spain and France defeat Catalonia.
1713	Great Northern War	Second Battle of Hogland	(Finland)	22 July	Inconclusive naval battle between Russia and Sweden
1713	War of the Catalans	Siege of Barcelona	(Spain)	25 July 1713 – 11 Sep 1714	Pro-Bourbon Spain and France capture Barcelona from pro-Habsburg Spain and Catalonia.
1713	Great Northern War	Battle of Pälkäne	(Finland)	17 Oct	Russian victory over Sweden.
1713	Great Northern War	Second Siege of Tönning	(Germany)	1713 – Feb 1714	Danish-Russian-Saxon victory over Sweden and Holstein-Gottorp.
1714	War of the Catalans and War of the Spanish Succession	Battle of Arbúcies	(Spain)	14 Jan	Catalonia defeats pro-Bourbon Spain and France.
1714	War of the Catalans and War of the Spanish Succession	Battle of Balsareny	(Spain)	14 Jan	Catalonia defeats pro-Bourbon Spain and France.
1714	War of the Catalans and War of the Spanish Succession	Battle of La Gleva	(Spain)	3 Feb	Pro-Bourbon-Spain and France defeat Catalonia.
1714	Great Northern War	Battle of Napue	(Finland)	19 Feb—2 March	Russian victory over Sweden. Also known as the Battle of Storkyro.
1714	War of the Catalans and War of the Spanish Succession	Naval battle of Barcelona	(Spain)	24 Feb	Catalonia defeats Great Britain.
1714	War of the Catalans and War of the Spanish Succession	Battle of Manresa	(Spain)	7 May	Catalonia defeats pro-Bourbon Spain and France.
1714	Great Northern War	Battle of Gangut	(Finland)	7 Aug	Swedish fleet is defeated by much larger Russian fleet.
1714	War of the Catalans and War of the Spanish Succession	Battle of Talamanca	(Spain)	13–14 Aug	Catalonia defeats pro-Bourbon Spain and France.
1715	Mughal–Sikh Wars	Battle of Gurdas Nangal	(India)	1 April—7 Dec	The Mughals end Banda Singh Bahadur's empire. Also known as the Siege of Gurdaspur.
1715	Great Northern War	Battle of Fehmarn	At sea	24 April	Danish naval victory over Sweden.
1715	Maratha–Rajput Wars	Battle of Pilsud	(India)	10 May	Jaipuri victory over the Maratha Confederacy.
1715	Great Northern War	Battle of Rügen	(Germany)	8 Aug	Indecisive naval battle between Sweden and Denmark-Norway.
1715	Jacobite rising of 1715	Skirmish of Dunfermline	(Scotland)	24 Oct	Jacobite troops defeated by the British government.
1715	Jacobite rising of 1715	Skirmish of Alness	(Scotland)	Oct	Jacobite victory over the British government.
1715	Jacobite rising of 1715	Battle of Preston	(England)	9–14 Nov	The British government defeats rebels during First Jacobite rising.
1715	Jacobite rising of 1715	Battle of Sheriffmuir	(Scotland)	13 Nov	The British under the Duke of Argyll defeated by the Jacobites, but manages to withdraw.
1715	Great Northern War	Battle of Stresow	(Germany)	16 Nov	Coalition (Prussia, Denmark-Norway and Saxony) victory over Sweden.
1716	Great Northern War	Battle of Høland	(Norway)	9 March	Swedish victory over Denmark-Norway.
1716	Great Northern War	Battle of Dynekilen	(Sweden)	8 July	Swedish fleet is defeated by Dano-Norwegian naval forces.
1716	Seventh Ottoman–Venetian War	Action of 8 July 1716	(Greece)	8 July	Indecisive naval battle between Venice and the Ottoman Empire.
1716	Austro-Turkish War	Battle of Petrovaradin	(Serbia)	5 Aug	Austria defeats the Ottomans.
1717		Battle of Trnjine		April	Montenegrin victory over much larger Ottoman forces commanded by Durmish Pasha attempting breakthrough to Montenegro.
1717	Great Northern War	Battles at Göta Älv	(Sweden)	2 May 1717 – 27 Sep 1719	Swedish victory over Denmark-Norway.
1717	Great Northern War	Battle of Gothenburg	(Sweden)	13–14 May	Swedes hold Gothenburg against Denmark-Norway.
1717	Seventh Ottoman–Venetian War	Battle of Imbros	(Turkey)	12–16 June	Indecisive naval battle between the Ottoman Empire and Venice.
1717	Austro-Turkish War	Siege of Belgrade	(Serbia)	18 June—21 Aug	Monthlong siege ends in an Austrian victory.
1717	Great Northern War	Battle of Strömstad	(Sweden)	19 July	Swedish victory over Denmark-Norway.
1717	Seventh Ottoman–Venetian War	Battle of Matapan	(Greece)	19 July	A navy of Venice, Portugal, Malta and the Papal States defeats the Ottoman Empire.
1717	War of the Quadruple Alliance	Spanish conquest of Sardinia	(Italy)	22 Aug—30 Oct	Spain conquers Sardinia from Austria.
1717		Omani invasion of Bahrain	(Bahrain)		The Sultanate of Oman invades Bahrain, ending 155 years of Safavid rule.
1718	Golden Age of Piracy	Siege of Charlestown	(United States)	May	Blackbeard holds the British Charleston's harbour hostage until his ransoms are met.
1718	War of the Quadruple Alliance	Battle of Cape Passaro	(Italy)	11 Aug	The British fleet under Torrington defeat the Spanish.
1718	Golden Age of Piracy	Battle of Cape Fear River	(United States)	26–27 Sep	British defeat pirates.
1718	Dzungar-Qing War	Battle of the Salween River	(Tibet)	Sep	Dzunghar forces defeat a Chinese expeditionary force sent to capture Lhasa.
1718	War of the Quadruple Alliance	Battle of Milazzo	(Italy)	15 Oct	Spain defeats the Holy Roman Empire.
1718	Great Northern War	Siege of Fredriksten	(Norway)	12 Dec	Swedish king is killed in Norway.
1718	Great Northern War	Carolean Death March	(Norway)	Dec	Swedish army under Armfeldt makes a hasty retreat after a failed incursion into Norway.
1719	Jacobite rising of 1719	Capture of Eilean Donan Castle	(Scotland)	10 May	British attack and destroy Jacobites in Eilean Donan.
1719	War of the Quadruple Alliance	Capture of Pensacola	(United States)	May	Status quo ante bellum between Spain and France.
1719	Great Northern War	Battle of Ösel Island	(Estonia)	4 June	Russian victory over Sweden.
1719	Jacobite rising of 1719	Battle of Glen Shiel	(Scotland)	10 June	Great Britain defeats Jacobite rebellion aided by Spain.
1719	War of the Quadruple Alliance	Battle of Francavilla	(Italy)	20 June	Spanish victory over Austria.
1719	War of the Quadruple Alliance	Siege of San Sebastián	(Spain)	30 June—19 Aug	France captures San Sebastián from Spain.
1719	Great Northern War	Attack on Marstrand	(Sweden)	10–16 July	Danish capture of a fort that led to a Swedish scandal.
1719	Great Northern War	Battle of Stäket	(Sweden)	13 Aug	Swedes defeat Russians.
1719	War of the Quadruple Alliance	Capture of Vigo	(Spain)	Oct	British capture Galician cities.
1719	War of the Quadruple Alliance	Battle of Cape St. Vincent	(Portugal)	20 Dec	Spain defeats Great Britain.
1720	War of the Quadruple Alliance	Battle of Nassau	(The Bahamas)	24 Feb—1 March	Spanish forces assault the British settlement of Nassau.
1720	War of the Quadruple Alliance	Villasur expedition	(United States)	16 June—14 Aug	Pawnee and Otoe defeat Spanish incursions.
1720	Great Northern War	Battle of Grengam	(Finland)	7 Aug	Both Sweden and Russia claim victory after a naval battle. Last major battle in Great Northern War.
1720	Dzungar–Qing War	Chinese expedition to Tibet	(Tibet)		Qing rule is established in Tibet at the cost of the Dzungar Khanate.

== 1721–1740 ==
Year	War	Battle	Loc.	Date(s)	Description
1721		Attingal Outbreak	(India)	April—Oct	Native rebels siege the British Anchuthengu Fort and massacre 140 East India Company soldiers.
1721	Russo-Persian War	Sack of Shamakhi	(Azerbaijan)	18 Aug	Casus belli of the Russo-Persian War. Sunni Lezgins sack the Safavid Persian city.
1721	Mughal-Jat Wars	Battle of Fatehpur Sikri	(India)	26 Sep	Jat victory over Mughals.
1721	Jacobite rising of 1719	Battle of Glen Affric	(Scotland)		British Government-backed forces of the Clan Ross fight against the forces of the Clan Mackenzie.
1721	Jacobite rising of 1719	Battle of Coille Bhan	(Scotland)		Small skirmish between Jacobites and British Government forces.
1722	Golden Age of Piracy	Battle of Cape Lopez	(Gabon)	10 Feb	British defeat pirates.
1722	Hotaki-Safavid War	Battle of Gulnabad	(Iran)	8 March	The military forces from Hotak dynasty defeat the army of the Safavid Empire.
1722	Hotaki-Safavid War	Siege of Isfahan	(Iran)	8 March—23 Oct	Capture of Safavid capital Isfahan by the Hotaki Dynasty.
1722	Dummer's War	Battle of Winnepang	(Canada)	July	New England forces attack Miꞌkmaq.
1722	Russo-Persian War	Peter the Great's capture of Rasht	(Iran)	Dec	Russians hold Rasht for 10 years.
1723	Golden Age of Piracy	Capture of the schooner Fancy	(United States)	10 June	British capture pirates.
1724	Dummer's War	Battle of Norridgewock	(Canada) / (United States)	23 Aug	New England colonists massacre Abenaki.
1724		Battle of Shakar Kheda	(India)	11 Oct	Hyderabad State gains independence.
1725	Dummer's War	Battle of Pequawket	(United States)	9 May	Death of Chief Paugus.
1726		Battle of Ancedan	(Iran)	20–21 Nov	The Hotak dynasty defeats the Ottoman Empire.
1726	Anglo-Spanish War	Blockade of Porto Bello	(Panama)	1726—1728	Spanish evade British blockade.
1727	Anglo-Spanish War	Thirteenth siege of Gibraltar	(Gibraltar)	11 Feb—12 June	British victory over Spain.
1727	Syunik rebellion	Battle of Halidzor	(Armenia)	26 Feb—7 March	Armenian victory over the Ottomans.
1727	Anglo-Spanish War	Action of 11 March 1727	(Spain)	11 March	British push away Spanish fleet.
1727	Naderian Wars	Battle of Sangan	(Iran)	July—Oct	Sadozai defeat against Safavids.
1728	Maratha-Nizam War	Battle of Palkhed	(India)	28 Feb	Maratha Peshwa Baji Rao I defeats Mughal Nizam-ul-Mulk, Asaf Jah I.
1729	Decline of the Mughal Empire	Battle of Bundelkhand	(India)	March	Maratha-Bundelkhandi forces defeat Mughals.
1729	Naderian Wars	Herat Campaign of 1729	(Afghanistan)	4 May—1 July	Nader Shah of Iran captures Herat.
1729	Naderian Wars	Battle of Kafer Qal'eh	(Afghanistan)	4 May—1 July	Sadozai defeat against Safavids.
1729	Naderian Wars	Battle of Herat	(Afghanistan)	July	Persians capture Herat.
1729	Naderian Wars	Battle of Damghan	(Iran)	29 Sep—5 Oct	Nader Shah defeats the Afghans.
1729	Naderian Wars	Battle of Khwar Pass	(Iran)	Oct	Hotaki forces fail to ambush Safavid forces.
1729	Naderian Wars	Battle of Murche-Khort	(Iran)	12 Nov	Safavid forces capture Isfahan.
1729	Naderian Wars	Liberation of Isfahan	(Iran)	16 Nov	Tahmasp II is restored to Persian throne.
1729		Natchez revolt	(United States)	29 Nov	Natchez people revolt and massacre French townspeople.
1730	Naderian Wars	Battle of Zarghan	(Iran)	15 Jan	The Afghan Hotak dynasty is expelled from Persia.
1730		Patrona Halil Rebellion	(Turkey)	Nov	End of the Tulip Period in Ottoman Empire.
1731	Naderian Wars	Herat Campaign of 1731	(Afghanistan)	July—Aug	Last stand of the Sadozai Sultanate of Herat.
1731		Ta-Chia-hsi revolt	(Taiwan)	1731—1732	Aboriginal Taiwanese rebellion against Qing rule.
1731	Slave Revolts in North America	Samba rebellion	(United States)		Slave rebellion in modern-day Louisiana.
1731	Naderian Wars and Ottoman–Persian War	Tahmasp's campaign of 1731	(Armenia)		Tahmasp II fails to conquer Armenia.
1732		Battle of Calenzana	(France)	14 Jan	The kingdom of Corsica defeats Austria.
1732	Spanish-Barbary wars	Spanish conquest of Oran	(Algeria)	15 June—2 July	Spain reconquers Oran.
1732		Battle of Mandsaur	(India)	21 Oct	Marathas force the Jaipur State to surrender.
1732	Naderian Wars and Ottoman–Persian War	Nader's Mesopotamian Campaign	(Iraq)	10 Dec 1732 – 19 Dec 1733	Status quo ante bellum.
1733	Ottoman–Persian War	Siege of Baghdad	(Iraq)	Feb–July	Ottomans repel Nader Shah's Safavid army attempting to take Baghdad.
1733	Ottoman–Persian War	Battle of Samarra	(Iraq)	19 July	Safavids fail to conquer Ottoman Iraq.
1733	War of the Polish Succession	Siege of Kehl	(Germany)	14–28 Oct	French victory over the Holy Roman Empire.
1733	Naderian Wars and Ottoman–Persian War	Battle of Kirkuk	(Iraq)	24–26 Oct	Nader Shah defeats the Ottoman army, killing general Topal Osman Pasha.
1733	War of the Polish Succession	Siege of Pizzighettone	(Italy)	11 Nov—9 Dec	Franco-Sardinian victory over Austria.
1733	Slave Revolts in North America	1733 slave insurrection on St. John	(United States)	23 Nov	Rebellion suppressed.
1734	War of the Polish Succession	Siege of Danzig	(Poland)	22 Feb—30 June	Russians capture Gdańsk.
1734	War of the Polish Succession	Siege of Gaeta	(Italy)	8 April—6 Aug	Franco-Spanish victory over Austria.
1734	War of the Polish Succession	Siege of Trarbach	(Germany)	10 April—2 May	French victory over the Holy Roman Empire.
1734	War of the Polish Succession	Siege of Capua	(Italy)	April—30 Nov	Spanish victory over Austria.
1734	War of the Polish Succession	Battle of Bitonto	(Italy)	25 May	Spanish victory over Austria.
1734	War of the Polish Succession	Battle of Colorno	(Italy)	25 May—5 June	Franco-Sardinian victory over Austria.
1734	War of the Polish Succession	Siege of Philippsburg	(Germany)	Late May–18 July	French victory over the Holy Roman Empire.
1734	War of the Polish Succession	Battle of San Pietro	(Italy)	29 June	Franco-Sardinian victory over Austria.
1734	War of the Polish Succession	Battle of Guastalla	(Italy)	19 Sep	Franco-Sardinian victory over Austria.
1735	Ottoman–Persian War	Battle of Yeghevārd	(Armenia)	19 June	Final major engagement of the war sees Persians decisively defeat Ottomans.
1735	Ottoman–Persian War	Siege of Ganja	(Azerbaijan)	3 Nov 1734 – July 9, 1735	Safavids recapture city from Ottomans.
1735	War of the Polish Succession	Battle of Clausen	(Germany)	20 Oct	One of the final engagements of the war.
1736	Russo-Turkish War of 1735–1739	Battle of Azov	(Russia)	10 April—15 July	Russia captures Azov Fortress from the Ottoman Empire.
1736	Russo-Turkish War of 1735–1739	Siege of Perekop	(Autonomous Republic of Crimea)	19 May—12 Nov	Massive blow to Crimean independence. Russia captures Perekop, but is later ousted by the Ottoman Empire and the Crimean Khanate.
1736	Mughal-Sikh Wars	Battle of Basarke	(India) / (Pakistan)	23–24 Oct	Sikh forces under Nawab Kapur Singh defeat the Mughal Empire.
1737	Naderian Wars	Siege of Kandahar	(Afghanistan)	April	End of the Hotak dynasty. Afsharid Persia under Nader Shah captures Kandahar.
1737	Russo-Turkish War of 1735–1739	Siege of Ochakov	(Ukraine)	2 July	Russian-Cossack victory over the Ottoman Empire.
1737	Russo-Turkish War of 1735–1739	Battle of Bender	(Moldova)	Mid-July	Ottoman Empire defeats Russia.
1737	Russo-Turkish War of 1735–1739	Battle of Banja Luka	(Bosnia and Herzegovina)	4 Aug	Ottoman-Bosnian victory over Austria.
1737	Mughal–Maratha wars	Battle of Bhopal	(India)	24 Dec	Maratha victory over Hyderabad State, Oudh State, the Kingdom of Amber and Kota State. Malwa is incorporated into the Maratha Empire.
1738		Battle of the Dindar River	(Sudan)	March/April	Major Ethiopian defeat against the Kingdom of Sennar.
1738	Naderian Wars	Battle of Khyber Pass	(Afghanistan)	26 Nov	Persians defeat Mughals.
1739	Luso–Maratha War	Battle of Vasai	(India)	17 Feb—16 May	Portuguese forces pull out of Vasai after losing a battle to the Maratha Empire.
1739	Naderian Wars	Battle of Karnal	(India)	24 Feb	Nader Shah of Persia decisively defeats the Mughal Empire, capturing and sacking Delhi.
1739	Naderian Wars	Skirmish of Chenab	(India)	5 May	Sikhs under Jassa Singh Adluwalia win small confrontation with Persians under Nader Shah.
1739	Austro-Turkish War/Russo-Turkish War	Battle of Grocka	(Serbia)	22–23 July	Ottoman Empire defeats Austria.
1739	Austro-Turkish War/Russo-Turkish War	Capture of Belgrade	(Serbia)	July—18 Sep	Ottomans recapture Belgrade from Austria.
1739	Austro-Turkish War/Russo-Turkish War	Battle of Stavuchany	(Ukraine)	28 Aug	Russians defeat Ottoman Empire.
1739	Slave Revolts in North America	Stono Rebellion	(United States)	9 Sep	Largest slave revolt in the Southern Colonial era fails.
1739	War of Jenkins' Ear	Battle of Porto Bello	(Panama)	20 Nov	British capture Panamanian settlement from Spain.
1740	War of Jenkins' Ear	Action of 8 April 1740	At sea	8 April	British victory over Spain.
1740		First Battle of Giria	(India)	26 April	Alivardi Khan becomes Nawab of Bengal after the death of Sarfaraz Khan.
1740	War of Jenkins' Ear	Siege of St. Augustine	(United States)	13 June—20 July	Spanish hold St. Augustine from Great Britain.
1740	War of Jenkins' Ear	Siege of Fort Mose	(United States)	26 June	Spanish and free black troops hold off British forces.
1740	War of Jenkins' Ear	First attack on Fuerteventura in 1740	(Spain)	13 Oct	Spanish fend off British attacks.
1740	War of Jenkins' Ear	Second attack on Fuerteventura in 1740	(Spain)	24 Nov	Spanish fend off British attacks.
1740	Persian-Uzbek Wars and Nader Shah's Central Asian campaign	Battle of Pitnak	(Uzbekistan)		Afsharid Persians under Nader Shah decisively defeat and annex the Khanate of Khiva.
1740	Persian-Uzbek Wars and Nader Shah's Central Asian campaign	Capture of Bukhara	(Uzbekistan)		Afsharid Persians capture Bukhara from the Khanate of Bukhara.
1740	Persian-Uzbek Wars and Nader Shah's Central Asian campaign	Capture of Samarkand	(Uzbekistan)		Persians capture Samarkand from the Uzbeks.

== 1741–1760 ==
Year	War	Battle	Loc.	Date(s)	Description
1741	Deccan wars	First Siege of Trichinopolly	(India)	16 Jan—26 March	Maratha army kicks out Carnatic Sultanate.
1741	War of Jenkins' Ear and War of the Austrian Succession	Battle of Cartagena de Indias	(Colombia)	13 March—20 May	Spanish claim a decisive victory in one of the biggest British naval defeats.
1741	First Silesian War and War of the Austrian Succession	Battle of Mollwitz	(Poland)	10 April	Prussia under Frederick the Great fights and beats the Austrians under von Neipperg.
1741	Decline of the Mughal Empire	Battle of Gangwana	(India)	11 June	Jaipuri and Mughal victory over Marwar.
1741	War of Jenkins' Ear	Invasion of Cuba	(Cuba)	4/5 Aug—9 Dec	Spain holds Cuba from British.
1741	Travancore-Dutch War	Battle of Colachel	(India)	10 Aug	Marathanda Raja of Travancore defeats Dutch East India Company at Colachel.
1741	Russo-Swedish War	Battle of Villmanstrand	(Finland)	23 Aug	Russian victory over Sweden.
1741	War of the Austrian Succession	Battle of Prague	(Czech Republic)	25–26 Nov	France, Bavaria and Saxony capture Prague from Austria.
1742	War of the Austrian Succession	Battle of Schärding	(Austria)	17 Jan	Austria defeats Bavaria.
1742	First Silesian War and War of the Austrian Succession	Battle of Chotusitz	(Czech Republic)	17 May	Frederick the Great beats the Austrians for a second time under Prince Charles Alexander of Lorraine.
1742	First Silesian War and War of the Austrian Succession	Battle of Sahay	(Czech Republic)	24 May	French victory over Austria.
1742	War of Jenkins' Ear and War of the Austrian Succession	Action of 14 June 1742	(France)	14 June	British victory over Spain.
1742	First Silesian War and War of the Austrian Succession	Siege of Prague	(Czech Republic)	27 June—18 Dec	France successfully withdraw through the Austrian lines after a long siege, so Austria manages to retake Prague.
1742	War of Jenkins' Ear	Invasion of Georgia	(United States)	5–25 July	Spanish attempt to invade British Georgia but fail.
1742	War of Jenkins' Ear	Battle of Bloody Marsh	(United States)	7 July	British victory over Spain.
1742	War of Jenkins' Ear	Battle of Gully Hole Creek	(United States)	18 July	British victory over Spain.
1742	Decline of the Mughal Empire	First Battle of Katwa	(India)	17 Sep	Marathas are forced to leave Bengal Subah.
1742		Battle of Galudoghson	(United States)	18 Dec	Virginia militia and Iroquois warriors both withdraw from the fight.
1743	War of the Austrian Succession	Battle of Campo Santo	(Italy)	8 Feb	Indecisive as both Spanish-Neapolitans and Austro-Sardinians claim victory.
1743	War of Jenkins' Ear	Battle of La Guaira	(Venezuela)	2 March	Spanish defend Venezuela from British.
1743	Deccan wars	Second Siege of Trichinopoly	(India)	March—29 Aug	Maratha forces are pushed out by Nizam of Hyderabad.
1743	War of Jenkins' Ear	Battle of Puerto Cabello	(Venezuela)	16 April	Spain defeats Great Britain.
1743	War of the Austrian Succession	Battle of Simbach	(Germany)	9 May	Austria defeats Bavaria, the Palatinate and Hesse-Kassel.
1743	Dalecarlian Rebellions	Fourth Dalecarlian rebellion	(Sweden)	30 May	Last major rural uprising in Sweden.
1743	War of the Austrian Succession	Battle of Dettingen	(Germany)	27 June	French defeat against Great Britain, Hanover and Austria.
1743	Naderian Wars and Ottoman–Persian War	Siege of Mosul	(Iraq)	13 Sep—20 Oct	Negotiated Persian withdrawal from the Ottoman Empire.
1743	War of the Austrian Succession	Battle of Casteldelfino	(Italy)	7–10 Oct	Sardinia defeats Spain.
1744	Naderian Wars	Moḥammad Taqi Khan Shirazi's Rebellion	(Iran)	Jan—June	Shiraz and most of Fars province in Persia is sacked.
1744	War of the Austrian Succession	Battle of Toulon	(France)	22 Feb	Draw between British and Franco-Spanish fleets.
1744	War of the Austrian Succession	Siege of Villafranca	(France)	14–27 April	Franco-Spanish victory over Sardinia and Great Britain.
1744	War of the Austrian Succession	Action of 8 May 1744	(Portugal)	8 May	French victory over Great Britain.
1744	King George's War	Raid on Canso	(Canada)	23 May	French take a town in British Nova Scotia.
1744	King George's War	First Siege of Annapolis Royal	(Canada)	1 July—6 Oct	French-Mi'kmaq attempt to take British Nova Scotia and fail.
1744	War of the Austrian Succession	Second Battle of Casteldelfino	(Italy)	18 July	French troops are victorious against Sardinians at bayonet-point despite several orders to retreat.
1744	Ottoman–Persian War (1743–1746) and Campaigns of Nader Shah	Siege of Kars	(Turkey)	29 July-9 Oct	Unsuccessful Persian siege on the Ottoman Caucasus.
1744	War of the Austrian Succession	Battle of Velletri	(Italy)	12 Aug	Spanish-Neapolitan victory over Austria.
1744	Unification of Nepal	Battle of Nuwakot	(Nepal)	26 Sep	Gorkhali forces defeat Nuwakot.
1744	War of the Austrian Succession	Battle of Madonna dell'Olmo	(Italy)	30 Sep	Franco-Spanish victory over Sardinian forces. Prince of Conti is wounded twice.
1744	Unification of Nepal	Battle of Belkot	(Nepal)	Late 1744	Early in the unification, Gorkhalis defeat the Belkot Kingdom.
1745	War of the Austrian Succession	Battle of Pfaffenhofen	(Germany)	15 April	Austrians defeats France, Bavaria and the Electoral Palatinate.
1745	War of the Austrian Succession	Siege of Tournai	(Belgium)	25 April—19 June	France captures Tournai from Austria. Tournai was defended by Dutch troops.
1745	King George's War	Second Siege of Annapolis Royal	(Germany)	2–23 May	British defeat Mi'kmaq and French troops a second time.
1745	War of the Austrian Succession	Battle of Fontenoy	(Belgium)	11 May	French victory against a coalition made of Great Britain, Hanover, the Dutch Republic and Austria.
1745	War of the Austrian Succession	Siege of Louisbourg	(Canada)	11 May—28 June	British victory over France.
1745	King George's War	Capture of Vigilant	(Canada)	18–20 May	British victory over France.
1745	War of the Austrian Succession	Battle of Anguilla	(United Kingdom)	21 May	British defend Anguilla from France.
1745	Second Silesian War and War of the Austrian Succession	Battle of Hohenfriedberg	(Poland)	4 June	Frederick the Great beats an Austro-Saxon army under Prince Charles Alexander of Lorraine.
1745	King George's War	Naval battle off Tatamagouche	(Canada)	26 June	Britain defends against a French-Mi'kmaq force.
1745	War of the Austrian Succession	Battle of Melle	(Belgium)	9 July	French victory over Austria, Great Britain, Hanover and the Netherlands.
1745	War of the Austrian Succession	Fall of Ghent	(Belgium)	11–15 July	French take Ghent from Austria.
1745	Jacobite rising of 1745	Highbridge Skirmish	(Scotland)	16 Aug	Jacobite victory over the British government.
1745	Naderian Wars and Ottoman–Persian War	Battle of Kars	(Turkey)	19 Aug	Persia defeats the Ottoman Empire in the last major engagement of the war.
1745	War of the Austrian Succession	Siege of Ostend	(Belgium)	23 Aug	French victory over a British garrison. Ostend was captured from Austria.
1745	Jacobite rising of 1745	First Siege of Ruthven Barracks	(Scotland)	29 Aug	The British government holds barracks against the Jacobites.
1745	Jacobite rising of 1745	Battle of Prestonpans	(Scotland)	21 Sep	Jacobite Stuarts defeat the English.
1745	War of the Austrian Succession	Battle of Bassignano	(Italy)	27 Sep	France, Spain and Genoa defeat Sardinia and Austria.
1745	Second Silesian War and War of the Austrian Succession	Battle of Soor	(Czech Republic)	30 Sep	Frederick the Great defeats a superior Austro-Saxon force under Prince Charles Alexander of Lorraine.
1745	War of the Austrian Succession	Battle of Joseau	(France)	11 Oct	France defeats Sardinia.
1745	Jacobite rising of 1745	Siege of Culloden House	(Scotland)	15–16 Oct	British government victory over the Jacobites.
1745	Jacobite rising of 1745	First Siege of Carlisle	(England)	13–15 Nov	Jacobites capture Carlisle from the British government.
1745	Second Silesian War and War of the Austrian Succession	Battle of Hennersdorf	(Poland)	23 Nov	Prussian victory over Saxony.
1745	King George's War	Raid on Saratoga	(United States)	28 Nov	French victory over Great Britain.
1745	Second Silesian War and War of the Austrian Succession	Battle of Kesselsdorf	(Germany)	14 Dec	Prussians defeat Austro-Saxon force.
1745	Jacobite rising of 1745	Clifton Moor Skirmish	(England)	18 Dec	Inconclusive battle between the British government and the Jacobites.
1745	Jacobite rising of 1745	Second Siege of Carlisle	(England)	21–30 Dec	British government victory the Jacobites.
1745	Jacobite rising of 1745	Battle of Inverurie	(Scotland)	23 Dec	Jacobite and French victory over the British government.
1745	Decline of the Mughal Empire	Third Battle of Katwa	(India)	Dec	Marathas attack Bengal, but are forced to retreat further.
1745	Jacobite rising of 1745	First Siege of Fort Augustus	(Scotland)	Dec	British government victory over the Jacobites.
1746	Jacobite rising of 1745	Battle of Falkirk	(Scotland)	17 Jan	Jacobites defeat English dragoons.
1746	Jacobite rising of 1745	Siege of Stirling Castle	(Scotland)	18 Jan—1 Feb	British government victory over the Jacobites.
1746	War of the Austrian Succession	Siege of Brussels	(Belgium)	29 Jan—22 Feb	French capture Brussels from Austria.
1746	Jacobite rising of 1745	Second Siege of Ruthven Barracks	(Scotland)	10–11 Feb	Jacobite victory over the British government.
1746	Jacobite rising of 1745	Siege of Inverness	(Scotland)	21 Feb	Jacobite and French victory over the British government.
1746	Jacobite rising of 1745	Second Siege of Fort Augustus	(Scotland)	22 Feb—1 March	Jacobite victory over the British government.
1746	Jacobite rising of 1745	Atholl raids	(Scotland)	14–17 March	Jacobites flank British forces by surprise.
1746	Jacobite rising of 1745	Siege of Blair Castle	(Scotland)	17 March—2 April	Jacobite forces withdraw. Victory of the British government.
1746	Jacobite rising of 1745	Skirmish of Keith	(Scotland)	20 March	Jacobite and French victory over the British government.
1746	Jacobite rising of 1745	Battle of Dornoch	(Scotland)	20–21 March	Jacobite victory over the British government.
1746	Jacobite rising of 1745	Siege of Fort William	(Scotland)	20 March—3 April	British government victory over the Jacobites and France.
1746	Jacobite rising of 1745	Skirmish of Tongue	(Scotland)	25–26 March	British government victory over the Jacobites, France and Spain.
1746	Jacobite rising of 1745	Battle of Littleferry	(Scotland)	15 April	British government victory over the Jacobites.
1746	Jacobite rising of 1745	Battle of Culloden Moor	(Scotland)	16 April	Jacobites and France lose to British government forces.
1746	Jacobite rising of 1745	Skirmish of Loch nan Uamh	(Scotland)	2 May	Jacobite and French ships withdraw. British government victory.
1746	Jacobite rising of 1745	Skirmish of Loch Ailort	(Scotland)	9 May	Unknown results between the British government and the Jacobites.
1746	Jacobite rising of 1745	Skirmish of Arisaig	(Scotland)	17 May	Unknown results between the British government and the Jacobites.
1746	Jacobite rising of 1745	Raids on Lochaber and Shiramore	(Scotland)	22 May—31 Aug	British government victory, but Jacobite leader Charles Edward Stuart escapes to France.
1746	King George's War	Battle at Port-la-Joye	(Canada)	11 June	French-Mi'kmaq victory over Great Britain.
1746	War of the Austrian Succession	Battle of Piacenza	(Italy)	16 June	Austrian victory over Montcalm-led French.
1746	War of the Austrian Succession	Action of 6 July 1746	(India)	6 July	Inconclusive naval battle between Great Britain and France.
1746	War of the Austrian Succession	Battle of Rottofreddo	(Italy)	10 Aug	French defeat small Austrian force during French retreat to Genoa. Also known as the Battle of Tidone.
1746	King George's War	Siege of Fort Massachusetts	(United States)	19–20 Aug	French victory over Great Britain.
1746	First Carnatic War	Battle of Madras	(India)	7–9 Sep	French victory over Great Britain.
1746	War of the Austrian Succession	Raid on Lorient	(France)	20 Sep	French victory over Great Britain.
1746	War of the Austrian Succession	Battle of Rocoux	(Belgium)	11 Oct	French victory over an allied Austrian, British, Hanoverian and Dutch army outside Liège.
1746	First Carnatic War	Battle of Adyar	(India)	24 Oct	French forces defeat Carnatic Sultanate.
1746	War of the Austrian Succession	Siege of Antibes	(France)	5 Dec	French victory over Austria, Sardinia and Great Britain.
1746	War of the Austrian Succession	First Austro-Sardinian Siege of Genoa	(Italy)	6–9 Dec	Austro-British-Sardinian victory over France.
1747	King George's War	Battle of Grand Pré	(Canada)	10–11 Feb	French victory over Great Britain.
1747		Battle of Rajamahal	(India)	1–2 March	Jaipuri victory over Mewar, supporters of Madho Singh, Holkar, Bundi and Kota.
1747	Maratha invasions of Bengal	Battle of Burdwan	(India)	March	Bengals defeat Marathas.
1747	King George's War	Siege of Fort at Number 4	(United States)	7–9 April	
1747	War of the Austrian Succession	Second Austro-Sardinian Siege of Genoa	(Italy)	April—June	Austrians try to recapture Genoa and fail.
1747	War of the Austrian Succession	First Battle of Cape Finisterre	(Spain)	14 May	British victory over France.
1747	War of the Austrian Succession	Battle of Lauffeld	(Belgium) / (Netherlands)	2 July	French victory over British, Austrian, Dutch and Hanoverian armies.
1747	War of the Austrian Succession	Siege of Bergen op Zoom	(Netherlands)	12 July—16 Sep	French defeat the United Provinces supported by Great Britain.
1747	War of the Austrian Succession	Battle of Assietta	(Italy)	19 July	Sardinia defeats a French army.
1747	War of Jenkins' Ear	Voyage of the Glorioso	At sea	25 July—14 Oct	Four naval engagements between Spain and Great Britain involving the Glorioso.
1747	War of Jenkins' Ear	Raid on Matina	(Costa Rica)	13 Aug	Great Britain defeats Spain.
1747	War of the Austrian Succession	Second Battle of Cape Finisterre	(Spain)	14 Oct	Great Britain defeats Spain.
1748	War of the Austrian Succession	Action of 31 January 1748	(France)	31 Jan	British victory over France.
1748	Decline of the Mughal Empire	Battle of Manupur	(Pakistan)	11 March	Durrani defeat Mughals. Also known as the Battle of Lahore.
1748	War of Jenkins' Ear	Action of 18 March 1748	(Portugal)	18 March	British capture Spanish vessels.
1748	War of the Austrian Succession	Battle of Saint-Louis-du-Sud	(Haiti)	22 March	British victory over France.
1748	Mughal-Sikh Wars	Siege of Amritsar	(India)	March	Sikhs led by Nawab Kapur Singh decisively defeat Mughals and take city of Amritsar.
1748	War of Jenkins' Ear	Battle of Santiago de Cuba	(Cuba)	9 April	Spanish victory over Great Britain.
1748	War of the Austrian Succession	Siege of Maastricht	(Netherlands)	15 April—7 May	Final few months of the campaign in the Low Countries. France captures Maastricht from the Netherlands.
1748	War of the Austrian Succession	Siege of Cuddalore	(India)	17 June	British victory over France.
1748		Battle of Bagru	(India)	20–26 Aug	Jaipuri-Bharatpuri victory over supporters of Madho Singh.
1748	First Carnatic War	Siege of Pondicherry	(India)	Aug—Oct	French defeat British.
1748	War of Jenkins' Ear	Raid on Brunswick Town	(United States)	5 Sep	British victory over Spain.
1748	War of Jenkins' Ear	Battle of Havana	(Cuba)	12 Oct	British minor naval victory against Spain.
1749		1749 Muslim slave revolt in Malta	(Malta)	29 June	Failed slave revolt by Maltese Muslims.
1749	Second Carnatic War	Battle of Ambur	(India)	3 Aug	First major battle of the war. France, Chanda Sahib and Muzaffar Jang defeat the forces of Nasir Jung in a civil war in the Hyderabad State and the Carnatic Sultanate.
1749	Father Le Loutre's War	First Raid on Dartmouth	(Canada)	30 Sep	Mi'kmaqs and Acadians defeat British colonists.
1749		Battle of Penfui	(Timor-Leste)	8 Nov	Beginning of decline in Portuguese influence in Timor. The Netherlands defeats the Topasses.
1749	Father Le Loutre's War	Siege of Grand Pré	(Canada)	27 Nov—4 Dec	British defeat the Wabanaki Confederacy, the Mi'kmaq, the Maliseet, the Penobscot and France.
1750	Father Le Loutre's War	Battle at St. Croix	(Canada)	20–23 March	British defeat Mi'kmaq and Acadian militia.
1750	Durrani Campaign to Khorasan (1749–1751)	Siege of Mashhad	(Iran)	July-10 Nov	Durranis defeat Afsharids and capture large parts of Khorasan.
1750	Durrani Campaign to Khorasan (1749–1751)	Siege of Nishapur	(Iran)	1750-1751	Qara Bayat Amirdom defeat Durrani Empire.
1750	Father Le Loutre's War	Battle at Chignecto	(Canada)	3 Sep	British defeat Mi'kmaq militia.
1750		Battle of Kathio	(United States)		Chippewas defeat Sioux and gain control of Minnesota.
1750	Durrani Campaign to Khorasan (1749–51)	Battle of Turbat-i-Shaikh Jam	(Afghanistan)		Durrani victory over Afsharid Empire.
1751	Father Le Loutre's War	Second Raid on Dartmouth	(Canada)	13 May	Acadian-Mi'kmaq victory.
1751		Battle of Kirkhbulakh	(Armenia)	28 July	Kakheti victory over army of Azad Khan.
1751	Second Carnatic War	Third Siege of Trichinopoly	(India)	July 1751 – 10 April 1752	Carnatic defeat against British forces.
1751	Spanish-Barbary Wars	Action of 28 November 1751	(Portugal)	28 Nov	Spanish defeat Algerian pirates.
1751	Second Carnatic War	Battle of Arnee	(India)	3 Dec	British-Maratha forces defeat French-Carnatic ones.
1752	Decline of the Mughal Empire	Battle of Lahore	(Pakistan)	6 March—3 April	Durrani victory against Mughals.
1752	Second Carnatic War	Battle of Chingleput	(India)	March	British-Arcot victory.
1752		Naval Battle of Calicut	(India)	11 Dec	Portuguese victory.
1753	Father Le Loutre's War	Attack at Mocodome	(Canada)	21 Feb	Ratification of the Treaty of 1752 ends.
1753	Safdarjung's rebellion	Capture of Delhi	(India)	10 March	Old Delhi plundered.
1753	Second Carnatic War	Battle of Seringham	(India)	12 April—8 June	British caught off guard by French-Arcot forces but manage to rally to victory.
1753	Father Le Loutre's War	Attack at Jeddore	(Canada)	19 May	Mi'kmaq attack and massacre residents of Jeddore, Nova Scotia.
1753	Second Carnatic War	Battle of Golden Rock	(India)	26 June	Battle between British and French forces near Trichinopoli.
1754	Maratha-Jat Wars	Battle of Kumher	(India)	20 Jan—18 May	Jats defeat Marathas and negotiate peace.
1754	French and Indian War	Battle of Jumonville Glen	(United States)	28 May	British victory over France.
1754	French and Indian War	Battle of Fort Necessity	(United States)	3 July	French take the fort from the British.
1755	French and Indian War	Braddock Expedition	(United States)	May—July	French-Native victory over Great Britain.
1755	French and Indian War	Battle of Fort Beauséjour	(Canada)	3–16 June	British capture fort from France.
1755	French and Indian War	Action of 8 June 1755	(Canada)	8 June	British victory over France.
1755	French and Indian War	Battle of the Monongahela Valley	(United States)	9 July	Key battle in Braddock Expedition, Britain fails to capture Fort Duquesne from French.
1755	French and Indian War	Battle of Petitcodiac	(Canada)	4 Sep	French-Acadian-M'ikmaq victory over British.
1755	French and Indian War	Battle of Lake George	(United States)	8 Sep	British-Iroquois victory over French.
1755		Battle of Čevo	(Montenegro)	Nov—3 Dec	Ahmad Pasha and 20,000 Ottoman soldiers capture Čevo before being repulsed from Montenegro by 5,000 Montenegrin fighters.
1755		Battle of Taliwa	(United States)		Cherokee defeat Muscogee Confederacy.
1756	Guaraní War	Battle of Caiboaté	(Brazil)	10 Feb	Sepé Tiaraju leads a rebellion against Jesuit Spanish and Portuguese authorities.
1756	French and Indian War	Battle of Fort Bull	(United States)	27 March	French capture British fort.
1756	French and Indian War	Battle of the Trough	(United States)	March—April	Shawnee and Lenape forces defeat British.
1756	French and Indian War	Battle of Sideling Hill	(United States)	4 April	Lenape victory over Great Britain.
1756	French and Indian War	Battle of Great Cacapon	(United States)	18 April	British troops ambushed by Shawnee and Lenape in a battle deemed Mercer's Massacre.
1756	Seven Years' War	Siege of Fort St Philip	(Spain)	April—29 June	French victory over Great Britain.
1756	French and Indian War	Raid on Lunenburg, Nova Scotia	(Canada)	8 May	French and local troops push back a British incursion.
1756	Seven Years' War	Battle of Minorca	(Spain)	20 May	The French fleet gains a strategic victory over Great Britain.
1756	Seven Years' War and Third Carnatic War	Siege of Calcutta	(India)	20 June	Bengal Subah under Nawab Siraj ud-Daulah captures Kolkata from British.
1756	French and Indian War	Battle of Fort Oswego	(United States)	10 Aug	French and Native American allies take and raze the only British trading post on Lake Ontario, thus re-establishing French sovereignty.
1756	French and Indian War	Kittanning Expedition	(United States)	8 Sep	British expedition to retrieve prisoners of war ends in them massacring local Lenape.
1756	Third Silesian War and Seven Years' War	Siege of Pirna	(Germany)	10 Sep—14 Oct	Prussia captures Pirna from Saxon-Austrian troops.
1756	Third Silesian War and Seven Years' War	Battle of Lobositz	(Czech Republic)	1 Oct	Prussia defeats Austria in the opening battle of the Seven Years' War.
1757	Decline of the Mughal Empire	Battle of Narela	(India)	16 Jan	Maratha Empire defeats Durranis.
1757	French and Indian War	First Battle on Snowshoes	(United States)	21 Jan	Stalemate between France and Great Britain, continued the following year.
1757		Battle of Bobbili	(India)	24 Jan	Princely Estate of Vizianagaram inducts Bobbili.
1757	Decline of the Mughal Empire	Sack of Delhi	(India)	28 Jan—22 Feb	
1757	Seven Years' War	Battle of Chandannagar	(India)	23 March	British defeat French in India.
1757	Third Silesian War and Seven Years' War	Battle of Reichenberg	(Czech Republic)	21 April	Prussian victory over Austria.
1757	Third Silesian War and Seven Years' War	Battle of Prague	(Czech Republic)	6 May	Prussians beat the Austrians, though at a terrible cost.
1757	Third Silesian War and Seven Years' War	Battle of Kolín	(Czech Republic)	18 June	Frederick the Great of Prussia loses, for the first time, to Austria.
1757	Bengal War and Seven Years' War	Battle of Plassey	(India)	23 June	Robert Clive consolidates English rule over India. Great Britain defeats Bengal Subah and France.
1757	Seven Years' War	Invasion of Hanover	(Germany)	June—Sep	French capture Hanover, but then are forced to leave.
1757	French and Indian War	Battle of Sabbath Day Point	(United States)	23 July	French-Native American victory over Great Britain.
1757	Seven Years' War	Battle of Hastenbeck	(Germany)	26 July	French army defeats Hanover, Great Britain, Hesse-Kassel and Brunswick.
1757	Mysorean invasion of Malabar	Mysore's campaigns against the states of Malabar	(India)	July	Mysore takes the Malabar Coast and defeats Calicut.
1757	French and Indian War	Siege of Fort William Henry	(United States)	4–9 Aug	French-Native forces defeat the British, then Natives slaughter prisoners.
1757	Afghan–Maratha War and Decline of the Mughal Empire	Battle of Delhi	(India)	11 Aug	Durranis capture Delhi from Mughal Empire.
1757	Third Silesian War and Seven Years' War	Battle of Gross-Jägersdorf	(Russia)	30 Aug	Russians under Apraksin defeat the Prussians.
1757	Third Silesian War and Seven Years' War	Battle of Moys	(Poland)	7 Sep	Prussian-Austrian battle ends in an Austrian victory.
1757	Third Silesian War and Seven Years' War	Raid on Berlin	(Germany)	16 Oct	Prussians pay 250000 thalers to the Holy Roman Empire.
1757	Seven Years' War	Battle of Cap-Français	(Haiti)	21 Oct	Indecisive naval battle between Great Britain and France.
1757	Third Silesian War and Seven Years' War	Battle of Rossbach	(Germany)	5 Nov	Frederick the Great crushes French; Louis XV says: "After me, the flood".
1757	Afghan–Sikh Wars and Decline of the Mughal Empire	Battle of Amritsar	(India)	11 Nov	Durrani loss against the Shaheedan Misl.
1757	French and Indian War	Attack on German Flatts	(United States)	12 Nov	French-Native-Acadian victory over Great Britain.
1757	Third Silesian War and Seven Years' War	First Battle of Breslau	(Poland)	22 Nov	Austrians briefly re-conquer Silesia from Prussia.
1757	Third Silesian War and Seven Years' War	Battle of Leuthen	(Poland)	5 Dec	Frederick the Great crushes Austrians under Prince Charles Alexander of Lorraine in what is considered Frederick's greatest victory.
1757	Third Silesian War and Seven Years' War	Second Battle of Breslau	(Poland)	7–20 Dec	Prussian victory over Austria and France.
1757	French and Indian War	Battle of Bloody Creek	(Canada)	10 Dec	French-Mi'kmaq victory over Great Britain.
1757	Georgian–Ottoman Wars	Battle of Khresili	(Georgia (country))	14 Dec	Georgian kingdoms defeat Ottomans.
1757	Pomeranian War and Seven Years' War	Blockade of Stralsund	(Germany)	Dec 1757 – June 1758	Prussians blockade Stralsund from Swedes.
1758	Seven Years' War	Battle of Cartagena	(Spain)	28 Feb	The British navy defeats France.
1758	French and Indian War	Second Battle on Snowshoes	(United States)	13 March	French victory over Great Britain.
1758	Seven Years' War	Battle of Cuddalore	(India)	29 April	Indecisive naval battle between Great Britain and France.
1758	Seven Years' War	Action of 29 April 1758	(France)	29 April	British victory over France.
1758	Seven Years' War	British capture of Senegal	(Senegal)	April—May	British capture Senegal, including the fortresses of Saint-Louis and Gorée from France.
1758	Decline of the Mughal Empire	Battle of Peshawar	(Pakistan)	8 May	Durrani loss by the Maratha Empire.
1758	Seven Years' War	Raid on St Malo	(France)	5–12 June	British victory over France.
1758	French and Indian War	Battle of Louisbourg	(Canada)	8 June—26 July	British capture fort controlling the entrance to St. Lawrence River from France.
1758	Spanish-Barbary Wars	Battle of Cape Palos	At sea	9–10 June	Spanish defeat Algerian pirates.
1758	Seven Years' War	Battle of Rheinberg	(Germany)	12 June	Indecisive battle between France and a coalition of Great Britain-Hanover, Prussia and Hesse-Kassel.
1758	Seven Years' War	Battle of Krefeld	(Germany)	23 June	Prussia and Hanover under Ferdinand drive French across the Rhine.
1758	Third Silesian War and Seven Years' War	Battle of Domstadtl	(Czech Republic)	30 June	Austria under von Laudon and von Siskovits route a convoy with supplies for the Prussians besieging Olomouc, protected by forces of von Zieten.
1758	French and Indian War	Petitcodiac River campaign	(Canada)	June—Nov	British victory over France.
1758	French and Indian War	Battle of Bernetz Brook	(United States)	6 July	British victory over the French in the Carillon campaign.
1758	French and Indian War	Battle of Carillon	(United States)	6–8 July	A far superior British force is badly mauled after attacking entrenched French head-on. Also called Battle of Ticonderoga.
1758	Seven Years' War	Battle of Negapatam	(India)	3 Aug	Britain and France fight indecisive naval battle.
1758	Seven Years' War	Raid on Cherbourg	(France)	7–16 Aug	British victory over France.
1758	Third Silesian War and Seven Years' War	Battle of Zorndorf	(Poland)	25 Aug	Frederick battles Russians under Fermor in Prussia to a bloody draw.
1758	French and Indian War	Battle of Fort Frontenac	(Canada)	26–28 Aug	British victory over France.
1758	Seven Years' War	Battle of Saint Cast	(France)	11 Sep	French victory over Great Britain.
1758	French and Indian War	Battle of Fort Duquesne	(United States)	14 Sep	French repel British attack, but realize they can't hold fort. Fort Duquesne abandoned by French in November.
1758	Pomeranian War and Seven Years' War	Battle of Tornow	(Germany)	26 Sep	Prussian victory over Sweden.
1758	Pomeranian War and Seven Years' War	Battle of Fehrbellin	(Germany)	28 Sep	Swedish victory over Prussia.
1758	French and Indian War	Cape Sable campaign	(Canada)	Sep—Oct	British victory over France.
1758	Third Silesian War and Seven Years' War	First Siege of Kolberg	(Poland)	4 Oct—1 Nov	Prussians defeat Russia.
1758	Seven Years' War	First Battle of Lutterberg	(Germany)	10 Oct	French victory over Hanover.
1758	French and Indian War	Battle of Fort Ligonier	(United States)	12 Oct	French attack on British fort fails.
1758	Third Silesian War and Seven Years' War	Battle of Hochkirch	(Germany)	14 Oct	Austrians mildly defeat Prussians.
1758	Seven Years' War	Battle of Condore	(India)	9 Dec	British victory over France.
1758	Seven Years' War	Capture of Gorée	(Senegal)	Dec	British take Gorée, the slave trading post, from France.
1758	Seven Years' War	Siege of Madras	(India)	Dec 1758 – Feb 1759	Two-month siege leads to British victory over France.
1759	Seven Years' War	Invasion of Guadeloupe	(France)	22 Jan—1 May	French Guadeloupe is occupied by the British for 4 years.
1759	Arauco War	Battle of Río Bueno	(Chile)	27 Jan	Spanish victory over Mapuche.
1759	Seven Years' War	Siege of Masulipatam	(India)	6 March—7 April	British victory over France.
1759	Seven Years' War	Battle of Bergen	(Germany)	13 April	French repulse Ferdinand's drive on Frankfurt-am-Main. Ferdinand commanded a coalition army of Great Britain-Hanover, Hesse-Kassel and Brunswick.
1759	Third Silesian War and Seven Years' War	Battle of Peterswalde	(Czech Republic)	14–20 April	Austrian column is destroyed by Prussia.
1759	Seven Years' War	Raid on Le Havre	(France)	3–5 July	British victory over France.
1759	French and Indian War	Battle of Fort Niagara	(United States)	6–26 July	British take fort from France, but Brigadier General Prideaux is killed.
1759	Third Silesian War and Seven Years' War	Battle of Kay	(Poland)	23 July	Russia defeats the Prussians.
1759	French and Indian War	Battle of La Belle-Famille	(United States)	24 July	British-Iroquois victory over France. Part of the Battle of Fort Niagara.
1759	French and Indian War	Battle of Ticonderoga	(United States)	26–27 July	British capture French fort.
1759	French and Indian War	Battle of Beauport	(Canada)	31 July	French stop British attempt to land near Quebec City. This notable naval bombardment saw British ships and batteries firing 4000 rounds in 8 hours on French shoreline entrenchments.
1759	Seven Years' War	Battle of Minden	(Germany)	1 Aug	A coalition of Great Britain-Hanover, Hesse-Kassel, Brunswick-Wolffenbüttel and Schaumburg-Lippe under Ferdinand defeats French and Saxons.
1759	Third Silesian War and Seven Years' War	Battle of Kunersdorf	(Poland)	12 Aug	Russo-Austrian victory over Prussia.
1759	Seven Years' War	Battle of Lagos	(Portugal)	18–19 Aug	British naval victory over France.
1759	Decline of the Mughal Empire	Battle of Lahore	(Pakistan)	Aug	Maratha victory against Durrani Empire.
1759	Seven Years' War	Battle of Pondicherry	(India)	10 Sep	Indecisive naval battle between Great Britain and France.
1759	Pomeranian War and Seven Years' War	Battle of Frisches Haff	(Poland) / (Germany)	10 Sep	Swedish victory over Prussia.
1759	French and Indian War	Battle of the Plains of Abraham	(Canada)	13 Sep	English defeat French outside Quebec City.
1759	Third Silesian War and Seven Years' War	Battle of Hoyerswerda	(Germany)	25 Sep	Prussians defeat Austrians.
1759	French and Indian War	Gulf of St. Lawrence campaign	(Canada)	Sep	British victory over France and the Wabanaki Confederacy.
1759	French and Indian War	St. Francis Raid	(Canada)	4 Oct	British victory over France and the Abenaki.
1759	French and Indian War	Ile Saint-Jean campaign	(Canada)	Oct—Nov	British victory over France and the Wabanaki Confederacy.
1759	Seven Years' War	Battle of Chinsurah	(India)	1 Nov	British victory over the Netherlands.
1759	Pomeranian War and Seven Years' War	Battle of Güstow	(Germany)	18 Nov	Prussian victory over Sweden.
1759	Seven Years' War	Battle of Quiberon Bay	(France)	20 Nov	The British navy defeats France.
1759	Third Silesian War and Seven Years' War	Battle of Maxen	(Germany)	21 Nov	Austria defeats Prussia.
1759	Afghan–Sikh Wars	Second Battle of Lahore	(Pakistan)	Nov	Inconclusive battle between Sikhs and Durrani.
1759	Third Silesian War and Seven Years' War	Battle of Meissen	(Germany)	4 Dec	Austria defeats Prussia.
1759		Battle of Kakkor	(India)		Rajput victory over the Marathas.
1760	Seven Years' War	Battle of Wandiwash	(India)	22 Jan	British defeat French-Maratha forces.
1760	Seven Years' War	Battle of Carrickfergus	(Northern Ireland)	21–26 Feb	French defeat Irish forces.
1760	Seven Years' War	Battle of Bishops Court	(United Kingdom)	28 Feb	British victory over France.
1760	Anglo-Cherokee War and French and Indian War	Siege of Fort Loudoun	(United States)	Feb—9 Aug	Cherokee defeat British.
1760	Third Silesian War and Seven Years' War	Battle of Neustadt	(Poland)	25 March	Prussian victory over Austria and France.
1760	Seven Years' War	Tacky's War	(Jamaica)	7 April 1760 – Late 1761	Slave uprising against Great Britain.
1760	Seven Years' War and French and Indian War	Battle of Sainte-Foy	(Canada)	28 April	French defeat British but fail to re-take Quebec City; entrenched French are forced to retreat when British naval re-enforcements arrive in May.
1760	French and Indian War	Battle of Pointe-aux-Trembles	(Canada)	16 May	British victory over France.
1760	Third Silesian War and Seven Years' War	Siege of Glatz	(Poland)	7 June—26 July	Austrian victory over Prussia.
1760	French and Indian War	Sainte-Thérèse Raid	(Canada)	11–21 June	British defeat French at Lake Champlain.
1760	Third Silesian War and Seven Years' War	Battle of Landeshut	(Poland)	23 June	In Bavaria, Austria captures a Prussian army.
1760	Anglo-Cherokee War and French and Indian War	Battle of Echoee	(United States)	27 June	Cherokee defeat British.
1760	French and Indian War	Battle of Restigouche	(Canada)	28 June—8 July	British victory over France and the Mi'kmaq.
1760	Seven Years' War	Battle of Corbach	(Germany)	10 July	French defeat British allied with German kingdoms.
1760	Third Silesian War and Seven Years' War	Siege of Dresden	(Germany)	13–22 July	Austro-Saxon victory over Prussia.
1760	Seven Years' War	Battle of Emsdorf	(Germany)	16 July	Anglo-Hanoverian-Hessian victory over France.
1760	Seven Years' War	Battle of Warburg	(Germany)	31 July	Victory of Great Britain-Hanover, Brunswick-Wolfenbüttel and Hesse-Kassel over France.
1760	Third Silesian War and Seven Years' War	Battle of Liegnitz	(Poland)	15 Aug	Prussia under Frederick defeats Austrians.
1760	French and Indian War	Battle of the Thousand Islands	(Canada)	16–24 Aug	Great Britain and the Iroquois defeat France.
1760	Third Silesian War and Seven Years' War	Battle of Strehla	(Germany)	20 Aug	Prussian victory over Austria.
1760	Third Silesian War and Seven Years' War	Second Siege of Kolberg	(Poland)	27 Aug—18 Sep	Prussians defeat Russia.
1760	Third Carnatic War	Siege of Pondicherry	(India)	4 Sep	British victory over France.
1760	Pomeranian War and Seven Years' War	Battle of Pasewalk	(Germany)	3 Oct	Swedish victory over Prussia.
1760	Third Silesian War and Seven Years' War	Raid on Berlin	(Germany)	3–12 Oct	Prussian capital Berlin occupied by Russo-Austrian forces.
1760	Seven Years' War	Battle of Kloster Kampen	(Germany)	15 Oct	French victory over Great Britain-Hanover, Hesse-Kassel, Brunswick-Wolfenbüttel and Prussia.
1760	Seven Years' War	Battle of the Windward Passage	At sea	17–19 Oct	British defeat French.
1760	Third Silesian War and Seven Years' War	Battle of Torgau	(Germany)	3 Nov	Prussian pyrrhic victory over Austria.

== 1761–1780 ==
Year	War	Battle	Loc.	Date(s)	Description
1761	Afghan–Maratha War and Decline of the Mughal Empire	Third Battle of Panipat	(India)	14 Jan	Afghans defeat the Marathas.
1761	Seven Years' War	Battle of Langensalza	(Germany)	15 Feb	Prussian-Hanoverian victory over France and Saxony.
1761	Seven Years' War	First Siege of Cassel	(Germany)	Mid-March	A coalition of Great Britain-Hanover, Prussia and Hesse-Kassel under Duke Ferdinand are unable to liberate Kassel from the French.
1761	Seven Years' War	Battle of Grünberg	(Germany)	21 March	French victory over Hanover, Hesse-Kassel and Brunswick-Wolfenbüttel ends the First Siege of Cassel.
1761	Seven Years' War	Capture of Belle Île	(France)	7 April–8 June	British capture Belle Île from France.
1761	Mughal-Jat Wars	Capture of Agra	(India)	3 May–12 June	Bharatpur State bribes the Mughals into occupying Agra.
1761	Seven Years' War	Invasion of Dominica	(Dominica)	June	British capture Dominica from France.
1761	Seven Years' War	Action of 17 July 1761	(Spain)	14–17 July	British victory over France.
1761	Seven Years' War	Battle of Villinghausen	(Germany)	15–16 July	Large French force defeated by a coalition of Great Britain-Hanover, Hesse-Kassel, Brunswick-Wolfenbüttel and Prussia.
1761	Seven Years' War	Battle of Cape Finisterre	(Spain)	13–14 Aug	British victory over France.
1761	Third Silesian War and Seven Years' War	Third Siege of Kolberg	(Poland)	24 Aug–16 Dec	Russians defeat Prussia.
1761	Decline of the Mughal Empire	First Battle of Sialkot	(Pakistan)	Aug	Sikhs defeat Mughals.
1761	Pomeranian War and Seven Years' War	Battle of Neuensund	(Germany)	18 Sep	Swedes defeat Prussians.
1761	Decline of the Mughal Empire	Battle of Gujranwala	(Pakistan)	Sep	Sikh victory over the Afghans.
1761	Seven Years' War	Battle of Ölper	(Germany)	13 Oct	Duchy of Brunswick victory over France and Saxony.
1761	Afghan–Sikh Wars	Siege of Lahore	(Pakistan)	27 Oct	Sikhs besiege and capture Lahore from the Afghans.
1762	Pomeranian War and Seven Years' War	Battle of Neukalen	(Germany)	2 Jan	Swedish victory over Prussia.
1762	Seven Years' War	Invasion of Martinique	(Martinique)	5 Jan–12 Feb	British hold Martinique from France.
1762	Afghan–Sikh Wars and Decline of the Mughal Empire	Battle of Kup	(India)	5 Feb	Afghans defeat Sikhs. Part of Vadda Ghalughara.
1762	Fantastic War and Seven Years' War	Spanish invasion of Portugal	(Spain) / (Portugal)	5 May–24 Nov	Anglo-Portuguese victory; Spanish are obliterated.
1762	Anglo-Spanish War	Action of 31 May 1762	(Spain)	31 May	British defeat Spain.
1762	Decline of the Mughal Empire	Battle of Harnaulgarh	(India)	May	Durranis kicked out of Sirhind-Fategarh by the Sikhs.
1762	Anglo-Spanish War	Siege of Havana	(Cuba)	6 June–13 Aug	Spanish Havana occupied by British for a year and a half.
1762	Seven Years' War	Battle of Wilhelmsthal	(Germany)	24 June	Great Britain-Hanover, Prussia and Hesse-Kassel defeat France.
1762	Seven Years' War	Second Battle of Lutterberg	(Germany)	19 July	Brunswick and Great Britain defeat France and Saxony.
1762	Third Silesian War and Seven Years' War	Battle of Burkersdorf	(Poland)	21 July	Prussia and Russia defeat Austria.
1762	Anglo-Spanish War	Battle for the Río San Juan de Nicaragua	(Nicaragua)	26 July–3 Aug	100 Spanish soldiers defeat 2000 British soldiers.
1762	Third Silesian War and Seven Years' War	Siege of Schweidnitz	(Poland)	7 Aug–9 Oct	Prussian victory over Austria.
1762	Unification of Nepal	First Battle of Makwanpur	(Nepal)	21 Aug	Gorkhali soldiers defeat the Kingdom of Makwanpur.
1762	Fantastic War and Seven Years' War	Siege of Almeida	(Portugal)	25 Aug	Spanish victory over Portugal.
1762	Fantastic War and Seven Years' War	Battle of Valencia de Alcántara	(Spain)	27 Aug	Anglo-Portuguese victory over Spain.
1762	Seven Years' War	Battle of Nauheim	(Germany)	30 Aug	French victory over Great Britain-Hanover, Hesse-Kassel and Prussia.
1762	Anglo-Spanish War, Fantastic War and Seven Years' War	First Cevallos expedition	(Uruguay) / (Brazil)	3 Sep 1762–24 April 1763	Spanish victory over Portugal and Great Britain.
1762	French and Indian War	Battle of Signal Hill	(Canada)	15 Sep	British victory over France in the last battle of the war.
1762	Anglo-Spanish War	Battle of Manila	(Philippines)	24 Sep–6 Oct	British capture Philippines from Spanish.
1762	Fantastic War and Seven Years' War	Battle of Vila Velha	(Portugal)	5 Oct	Anglo-Portuguese victory over Spain.
1762	Third Silesian War and Seven Years' War	Battle of Freiberg	(Germany)	29 Oct	Prussian victory over Austria.
1762	Anglo-Spanish War	Action of 30 October 1762	(Philippines)	30 Oct	British defeat Spain.
1762	Seven Years' War	Second Siege of Cassel	(Germany)	Oct–Nov	Allies (Great Britain-Hanover, Brunswick and Hesse-Kassel) occupy the Hessian capital of Kassel from France.
1762	Fantastic War and Seven Years' War	Battle of Marvão	(Portugal)	9–10 Nov	Great Britain and Portugal defeat Spain.
1762		Battle of Alegaon	(India)		Nizam of Hyderabad defeats Marathas.
1763		Second Battle of Makwanpur	(Nepal)	20 Jan	Gorkhali soldiers defeat Nawabs of Bengal and Murshidabad.
1763		Berbice slave uprising	(Guyana)	23 Feb	Rebellion suppressed by the Netherlands.
1763	Pontiac's Rebellion	Siege of Fort Detroit	(United States)	9 May–31 Oct	British victory over Pontiac's confederacy.
1763	Pontiac's Rebellion	Battle of Point Pelee	(Canada)	28 May	The Wyandot people defeat Great Britain.
1763	Pontiac's Rebellion	Siege of Fort Pitt	(United States)	22 June–10 Aug	British victory against a confederate army led by Seneca leader Guyasuta.
1763	Decline of the Mughal Empire	Third Battle of Katwa	(India)	19 July	English victory over Nawabs of Bengal and Murshidabad.
1763	Pontiac's Rebellion	Battle of Bloody Run	(United States)	31 July	Pontiac's confederacy defeats Great Britain.
1763	Pontiac's Rebellion	Battle of Bushy Run	(United States)	4–5 Aug	British defeat Natives of Pontiac's confederacy, led by Seneca leader Guyasuta and Lenape leader Keekyuscung.
1763	Maratha–Nizam War	Battle of Rakshasbhuvan	(India)	10 Aug	Marathas defeat Nizam of Hyderabad.
1763	Pontiac's Rebellion	Battle of Devil's Hole	(United States)	14 Sep	Seneca victory over Great Britain.
1763		Battle of Thrissur	(India)		Travancori victory over Calicut.
1764	Decline of the Mughal Empire	Battle of Sirhind	(India)	26 Feb	Sikhs capture Sirhind-Fategarh.
1764	Seven Years' War	Battle of Buxar	(India)	22–23 Oct	With his combined forces, the Mughal emperor attacks the British to drive them out of Bengal, but ultimately fails.
1764	Decline of the Mughal Empire	Battle of Delhi	(India)	Oct–Feb	Bharatpuri victory against Mughals.
1764		Battle of Atakpamé	(Togo)		Akan forces severely defeat Ashanti Empire.
1765	Afghan–Sikh Wars	Battle of Sutlej	(Pakistan) / (India)	March	The Afghan's defeats the Sikhs.
1765		Strilekrigen	(Norway)	18 April	Norwegian farmers rebel but are defeated.
1765		Larache expedition	(Morocco)	25–28 June	French troops fail to invade Morocco.
1766	Enlightenment in Spain	Esquilache Riots	(Spain)	23–26 March	Massive riots are sparked by increases in bread, oil, and coal prices.
1766		Monghyr Mutiny	(India)	1 May–12 June	Europeans stationed in Bengal stage a mutiny against Robert Clive.
1766	Arauco War	Mapuche uprising of 1766	(Chile)	25 Dec 1766 – Feb 1767	Spanish are pushed out of Araucanía Region.
1767	First Anglo-Mysore War	Battle of Tiruvannamalai	(India)	25 Sep	Decisive British victory over Mysoreans.
1767	Unification of Nepal	Battle of Sindhuli	(Nepal)	6 Nov	Gorkhalis defeat British.
1767	First Anglo-Mysore War	Siege of Ambur	(India)	10 Nov–7 Dec	British defend town from Mysoreans.
1767		Battle of Maonda and Mandholi	(India)	14 Dec	Rajput victory over Bharatpuri.
1767	Sino–Burmese War	Battle of Goteik Gorge	(Myanmar)	Late Dec	Burmese army is forced to resort to guerrilla warfare.
1767	Unification of Nepal	Battle of Kirtipur	(Nepal)		Gorkhalis defeat Kingdom of Lalitpur.
1767	Burmese–Siamese War	Battle of Bang Rajan	(Thailand)		
1768		Battle of Kama	(India)	29 Feb	Rajput victory over Bharatpuri.
1768	Sino–Burmese War	Battle of Maymyo	(Myanmar)	March	Burmese army under Maha Thiha Thura destroys the Qing Bannerman army at modern-day Pyinoolwin.
1768		Husayn Bey attack on Egypt	(Egypt)	May	Husayn Bey launched a campaign against Ali Bey al-Kabir from Gaza and established a base in Tanta. Ali Bey's forces confronted the rebels, who surrendered after running out of ammunition.
1768	First Anglo-Mysore War	Battle of Ooscota	(India)	22–23 Aug	Hyderabad notices a British attempt to aid the Maratha Empire.
1768	Unification of Nepal	Battle of Kathmandu	(Nepal)	26 Sep	Beginning of Shah dynasty.
1768	French conquest of Corsica	Battle of Borgo	(France)	8–9 Oct	Corsicans win first battle in French incursion.
1768	Post-Seven Years' War	Louisiana Rebellion of 1768	(United States)	1768–1769	Spanish defeat a Creole rebellion.
1768	Unification of Nepal	Battle of Lalitpur	(Nepal)		Gorkhalis fully defeat Kingdom of Lalitpur.
1769	French conquest of Corsica	Battle of Ponte Novu	(France)	8–9 May	France annexes Corsica.
1769		Siege of Tanjore	(India)	22 Sep–22 Oct	Rajah of Tanjore surrenders to Carnatic-British forces.
1769		Moamoria rebellion	(India)	25 Nov	Beginning of a 35-year rebellion that killed half the population of Ahom kingdom and brought the end of the Paik system.
1769	Unification of Nepal	Battle of Bhaktapur	(Nepal)		Gorkha Kingdom takes entire Kathmandu Valley.
1770	American Revolutionary War	Battle of Golden Hill	(United States)	19 Jan	In New York, the first blood is shed between the rebels and colonists.
1770	War of the Bar Confederation	Battle of Błonie	(Poland)	12 Feb	Russian victory over Poles.
1770	Russo-Turkish War	Battle of Aspindza	(Georgia (country))	20 April	Kartli-Kakheti victory over the Ottomans.
1770	Russo-Turkish War	Battle of Nauplia	At sea	27–28 May	Indecisive battle between Russians and Turks.
1770		Capture of Port Egmont	(United Kingdom)	10 June	Spain seizes Port Egmont on the British-owned Falkland Islands.
1770	Russo-Turkish War	Battle of Chesme	(Turkey)	6 July	Russian fleet defeats Ottoman fleet.
1770	Russo-Turkish War	Battle of Larga	(Moldova)	7 July	Russian army defeats Crimean Tatars and Ottoman janissaries.
1770	Russo-Turkish War	Battle of Kagul	(Moldova)	1 Aug	Russian army under Rumyantsev attacks and puts to flight 150,000 Turks.
1770	Orlov Revolt	First invasion of Mani	(Greece)		Ottomans begin their attempts to annex Mani, all of which fail.
1770	Orlov Revolt	Battle of Vromopigada	(Greece)		Maniots defeat an Ottoman incursion.
1771		Capture of Delhi	(India)	10 Feb	Marathas kick out Afghans from Delhi.
1771	War of the Bar Confederation	Combat of Lanckorona	(Poland)	20 Feb	
1771	Regulator Movement	Battle at the Yadkin River	(United States)	9 May	Regulator victory over North Carolinans.
1771	Regulator Movement	Battle of Alamance	(United States)	16 May	Colonial government crushes Regulators.
1771	War of the Bar Confederation	Battle of Lanckorona	(Poland)	21 May	A force of 3,500 Russians under Alexander Suvorov defeat a Polish formation of 4,000 men.
1771	Battles of the Zemene Mesafint	Three battles of Sarbakusa	(Ethiopia)	May	An alliance of three of the most powerful aristocrats of Ethiopia – Goshu of Amhara, Wand Bewossen, and Fasil of Damot – defeats Ras Mikael Sehul and Emperor Tekle Haymanot I, taking control of that country.
1771	Russo-Turkish War (1768–1774)	Ali bey campaign on Syria	(Syria)	June	Backed by Russia Ali Bey al-Kabir's forces had initial victories in Syria but the leader of his troops Abu al-Dhahab changed sides turning the situation into an Ottoman victory
1771		Battle of Lake Huleh	(Israel)	2 Sep	Al-Zayadina victory over Ottomans in a rebellion.
1771	War of the Bar Confederation	Battle of Stołowicze	(Belarus)	23 Sep	
1772	Russo-Turkish War	First Russian bombardment of Beirut	(Beirut)	18–23 June	Russians occupy Beirut until the 28th.
1772		Capture of Fort Boekoe	(Suriname)	20 Sep	Dutch forces under Jurriaan de Friderici capture and destroy Fort Boekoe defended by Maroon leader Boni.
1772	Russo-Turkish War	Battle of Patras	(Greece)	6–8 Nov	Russians defeat Ottomans.
1773	Russo-Turkish War	Action of 4 July 1773	At sea	4 July	Indecisive results after a Russian-Ottoman naval battle.
1773	Russo-Turkish War	Second Russian bombardment of Beirut	(Beirut)	2 Aug—10 Oct	Russians occupy Beirut until early February 1774.
1773	Russo-Turkish War	Action of 3 September 1773	At sea	3 Sep	Russians attack Ottomans who don't fight back.
1773	Pugachev's Rebellion	Siege of Orenburg	(Russia)	16 Oct	Russians besieged by peasants successfully defend their fortress.
1774	Pugachev's Rebellion	Siege of Yaits Fortress	(Kazakhstan)	10 Jan—27 April	Russians successfully defend from peasants.
1774	Pugachev's Rebellion	Battle of Tatishcheva	(Russia)	2 April	Russians defeat rebels.
1774	First Rohilla War	Battle of Miranpur Katra	(India)	23 April	British-Awadh victory over the Rohillas.
1774	Russo-Turkish War	Battle of Kozludzha	(Bulgaria)	20 June	Russian victory over the Ottomans.
1774	Russo-Turkish War	Battle of Kerch Strait	(Russia)	20 June	Ottomans attack Russians and then retreat.
1774	Pugachev's Rebellion	Battle of Kazan	(Russia)	12–15 July	Rebel Tatars and Cossacks sack Kazan.
1774	Pugachev's Rebellion	Battle of Tsaritsyn	(Russia)	21 Aug	Russians defeat peasants.
1774	Dunmore's War	Battle of Point Pleasant	(United States)	10 Oct	Frontiersmen defeat Shawnees.
1774	Ottoman–Persian War (1775–1776)	Battle of Chamchamel	(Iraq)	Nov	The Ottoman Empire defeats Iran.
1774	Spanish-Barbary War	Siege of Melilla	(Spain)	9 Dec	Spain holds Melilla from Moroccans.
1775		Battle of Pachgaon	(India)	26 Jan	Mudhoji Bhonsle ascends to the throne of Nagpur.
1775	American Revolutionary War	Battle of Lexington and Concord	(United States)	19 April	Patriot militia repel British in confrontation at Concord and drive them back to Boston.
1775	American Revolutionary War	Thompson's War	(United States)	9–15 May	Battle between Patriots and Loyalists prompt the Burning of Falmouth later in October.
1775	American Revolutionary War	Capture of Fort Ticonderoga	(United States)	10 May	Allen and Arnold capture fort.
1775	American Revolutionary War	Battle off Fairhaven	(United States)	14 May	Patriots storm British ship.
1775	American Revolutionary War	Battle of Chelsea Creek	(United States)	27–28 May	Patriots defeat British in the second battle of the war.
1775	American Revolutionary War	Battle of Machias	(United States)	11–12 June	First naval engagement of the American Revolution; British sloop captured.
1775	American Revolutionary War	Battle of Bunker Hill	(United States)	17 June	British win but incur double the losses of the Americans.
1775		Abu Al-Dahab Palestine campaign	(Palestine) / (Israel)	21 May-10 June	Acting on Ottoman orders Abu al-Dhahab invaded Palestine, he defeated Zahir al-Umar, Abu Al-Dahab conquered Gaza, Jaffa and Acre before suddenly dying of the plague
1775		Battle of Mandan	(India)	June	Shekhawat chiefs defeat Mughals.
1775	Spanish-Algerian war	Invasion of Algiers	(Algeria)	8 July	Ottoman Algeria defeats Spanish-Tuscan forces.
1775	American Revolutionary War	Battle of Gloucester	(United States)	8–9 Aug	British commander defeats Patriot forces.
1775	American Revolutionary War	Siege of Fort St. Jean	(Canada)	21 Aug—3 Nov	Americans under Montgomery capture fort near Montreal.
1775	American Revolutionary War	Raid on St. John	(Canada)	27 Aug	American privateers defeat British.
1775	Maltese Rebellion of 1775	Rising of the Priests	(Malta)	8 Sep	Maltese people revolt against the corrupt government and Knights Hospitaller.
1775	American Revolutionary War	Battle of Longue Pointe	(Canada)	25 Sep	American attack on Montreal led by Ethan Allen fails; Allen is captured.
1775	American Revolutionary War	Burning of Falmouth	(United States)	18 Oct	British burn Falmouth, Massachusetts.
1775	American Revolutionary War	Battle of Kemp's Landing	(United States)	15 Nov	British victory over Americans.
1775	American Revolutionary War	Raid on Charlottetown	(Canada)	17–18 Nov	American pirates defeat British.
1775	American Revolutionary War	Siege of Savage's Old Fields	(United States)	19–21 Nov	Inconclusive fight between South Carolina and the British.
1775	American Revolutionary War	Raid on Yarmouth, Nova Scotia	(Canada)	5 Dec	Americans defeat British militia.
1775	American Revolutionary War	Battle of Great Bridge	(United States)	9 Dec	American victory seals the fate of the British colonial government in Virginia.
1775	American Revolutionary War	Battle of Great Cane Break	(United States)	22 Dec	South Carolina victory over the British.
1775	American Revolutionary War	Battle of Quebec	(Canada)	31 Dec	Arnold and Montgomery defeated before Quebec City; Montgomery killed.
1776	American Revolutionary War	Battle of Moore's Creek Bridge	(United States)	27 Feb	North Carolina patriots defeat Scottish Loyalists.
1776	American Revolutionary War	Battle of the Rice Boats	(United States)	2–3 March	British ships set on fire by Americans.
1776	American Revolutionary War	Raid of Nassau	(The Bahamas)	3–4 March	American-backed Bahamians defeat British.
1776	American Revolutionary War	Battle of Saint-Pierre	(Canada)	25 March	Canadian-American forces defeat British.
1776	American Revolutionary War	Battle of Block Island	(United States)	8 April	British victory over the United Colonies.
1776	American Revolutionary War	Battle of The Cedars	(Canada)	15–16 May	British capture American forces near Montreal.
1776	American Revolutionary War	Battle of Trois-Rivières	(Canada)	8 June	American counterattack against the British during retreat from Quebec fails.
1776	American Revolutionary War	Battle of Sullivan's Island	(United States)	28 June	South Carolina defeats British.
1776	American Revolutionary War	Battle of Turtle Gut Inlet	(United States)	29 June	American naval battle with British.
1776	Apache-Mexico Wars	First Battle of Terrenate	(United States)	7 July	Spanish Pyrrhic victory over the Apache.
1776	American Revolutionary War	Battle of Gwynn's Island	(United States)	8–10 July	American victory over the British.
1776	American Revolutionary War and Cherokee–American wars	Battle of Lindley's Fort	(United States)	15 July	Patriots defeat Loyalists and their Cherokee allies.
1776	American Revolutionary War	Battle of Long Island	(United States)	27 Aug	Howe crushes Washington.
1776	American Revolutionary War	Landing at Kip's Bay	(United States)	15 Sep	British-Hessian victory over Americans.
1776	American Revolutionary War	Battle of Harlem Heights	(United States)	16 Sep	Washington repels Howe.
1776	American Revolutionary War	Raid on Canso	(Canada)	22 Sep—22 Nov	American victory over British.
1776	American Revolutionary War	Battle of Valcour Island	(United States)	11 Oct	Arnold escapes the British fleet under Carleton.
1776	American Revolutionary War	Rutherford Light Horse expedition	(United States)	17 Oct—16 Nov	American massacre Appalachian Native groups for supporting British.
1776	American Revolutionary War	Battle of Pell's Point	(United States)	18 Oct	British forces defeat Colonel Glover's forces.
1776	American Revolutionary War	Battle of Mamaroneck	(United States)	22 Oct	British victory over Americans.
1776	American Revolutionary War	Battle of White Plains	(United States)	28 Oct	Howe inflicts casualties on Washington's army.
1776	American Revolutionary War	Battle of Fort Cumberland	(Canada)	10–29 Nov	British victory over Americans.
1776	American Revolutionary War	Ambush of Geary	(United States)	14 Dec	American victory over British.
1776	American Revolutionary War	Battle of Iron Works Hill	(United States)	22–23 Dec	Precursor to George Washington's crossing of the Delaware River.
1776	American Revolutionary War	Battle of Trenton	(United States)	26 Dec	Washington surprises Hessian force.
1777	American Revolutionary War	Battle of the Assunpink Creek	(United States)	2 Jan	After repulsing the British during the day, Washington marches by night to Princeton. Also known as the Second Battle of Trenton.
1777	American Revolutionary War	Battle of Princeton	(United States)	3 Jan	Washington defeats the British force.
1777	American Revolutionary War	Battle of Millstone	(United States)	20 Jan	American victory over British with few casualties.
1777	American Revolutionary War	Forage War	(United States)	Jan—March	Short campaign in New Jersey.
1777	American Revolutionary War	Battle of Punk Hill	(United States)	8 March	Philadelphian-American victory over British.
1777	American Revolutionary War	Battle off Yarmouth	(Canada)	28 March	British victory over Americans.
1777	American Revolutionary War	Battle of Bound Brook	(United States)	13 April	British victory over Americans.
1777	American Revolutionary War	Battle of Ridgefield	(United States)	27 April	British victory over Americans.
1777	American Revolutionary War	Battle of Thomas Creek	(United States)	17 May	British victory over Americans.
1777	American Revolutionary War	Meigs Raid	(United States)	24 May	American victory over British.
1777	American Revolutionary War	Battle of Short Hills	(United States)	26 June	British victory over Americans.
1777	American Revolutionary War	Siege of Fort Ticonderoga	(United States)	2–6 July	Americans abandon fort to avoid British artillery.
1777	American Revolutionary War	Battle of Hubbardton	(United States)	7 July	Pyrrhic victory for the British over Americans.
1777	American Revolutionary War	Battle of Fort Anne	(United States)	8 July	British victory over Americans.
1777	American Revolutionary War	Capture of USS Hancock	(Canada)	8–9 July	British capture American ship.
1777	American Revolutionary War	Battle of Oriskany	(United States)	6 Aug	Herkimer killed in British ambush.
1777	American Revolutionary War	Battle of Machias	(United States)	13–14 Aug	American-Native alliance versus Britain ends in stalemate.
1777	American Revolutionary War	Battle of Bennington	(United States)	16 Aug	Stark eradicates detachment sent by Burgoyne.
1777	American Revolutionary War	Battle of Staten Island	(United States)	22 Aug	Skirmish that had little effect on the war.
1777	American Revolutionary War	Battle of Setauket	(United States)	22 Aug	Failed attempt to recreate Meigs Raid.
1777	American Revolutionary War	Battle of Cooch's Bridge	(United States)	3 Sep	One of the first battles involving Hessians.
1777	American Revolutionary War	Battle of Brandywine	(United States)	11 Sep	Howe drives Washington's troops to Philadelphia.
1777	American Revolutionary War	Battle of the Clouds	(United States)	16 Sep	British victory over Americans.
1777	American Revolutionary War	Battle of 1st Saratoga	(United States)	19 Sep	Morgan defeats Burgoyne at Freeman's Farm.
1777	American Revolutionary War	Battle of Paoli	(United States)	20 Sep	British victory over Americans.
1777	American Revolutionary War	Battle of Germantown	(United States)	4 Oct	Howe kills 700 patriots while losing 534.
1777	American Revolutionary War	Battle of Forts Clinton and Montgomery	(United States)	6 Oct	British victory over Americans.
1777	American Revolutionary War	Battle of 2nd Saratoga	(United States)	7 Oct	Gates defeats Burgoyne.
1777	American Revolutionary War	Battle of Red Bank	(United States)	22 Oct	American victory over British-Hessian troops.
1777	American Revolutionary War	Battle of Gloucester	(United States)	25 Nov	American victory over British-Hessian troops.
1777	American Revolutionary War	Battle of White Marsh	(United States)	5–8 Dec	Inconclusive battle between the Americans and British-Hessian troops.
1777	American Revolutionary War	Battle of Matson's Ford	(United States)	11 Dec	British victory over Americans.
1777		Battle of Saunshi	(India)		Kingdom of Mysore defeats Marathas.
1778	American Revolutionary War	Battle off Barbados	(Barbados)	7 March	British victory over Americans.
1778	American Revolutionary War	Battle of Quinton's Bridge	(United States)	18 March	British victory over Americans.
1778	American Revolutionary War	Frederica naval action	(United States)	19 April	American naval victory over British.
1778	American Revolutionary War	Battle off Liverpool, Nova Scotia	(Canada)	24 April	British defeat French raid.
1778	American Revolutionary War	North Channel Naval Duel	At sea	24 April	Jones, while outnumbered, defeats British fleet.
1778	American Revolutionary War	Battle of Crooked Billet	(United States)	1 May	American contingent is forced to abandon their supplies.
1778	American Revolutionary War	Battle of Barren Hill	(United States)	20 May	British-Hessian victory over Americans.
1778	American Revolutionary War	Mount Hope Bay raids	(United States)	25–30 May	British successfully raid American settlements.
1778	American Revolutionary War	Battle of Cobleskill	(United States)	30 May	British-Iroquois victory over Americans.
1778	American Revolutionary War	Action of 17 June 1778	(France)	17 June	Minor British victory over France.
1778	American Revolutionary War	Battle of Monmouth	(United States)	28 June	Washington stands off Clinton, who continues retreat to New York. Lee's order of retreat leads to court-martial.
1778	American Revolutionary War	Battle of Alligator Bridge	(United States)	30 June	American attack thwarted because of terrain, including ditch dug by British.
1778	American Revolutionary War	Battle of Wyoming	(United States)	3 July	British-Iroquois victory over Americans.
1778	Anglo-French War	First Battle of Ushant	(France)	27 July	Indecisive naval battle between the British and French.
1778	American Revolutionary War	Battle of Rhode Island	(United States)	29 Aug	First mixed-race regiment in American history.
1778	American Revolutionary War	Grey's raid	(United States)	5–12 Sep	British sack New Bedford, Massachusetts.
1778	American Revolutionary War	Invasion of Dominica	(Dominica)	7 Sep	French recapture Dominica from the British.
1778	American Revolutionary War	Attack on German Flatts	(United States)	17 Sep	British raid American troop ground.
1778	American Revolutionary War	Battle of Edgar's Lane	(United States)	30 Sep	Continental victory over Hessians.
1778	American Revolutionary War	Raid on Unadilla and Onaquaga	(United States)	2–16 Oct	Americans attack Iroquois villages.
1778	American Revolutionary War	Battle of Chestnut Neck	(United States)	6 Oct	American victory over British.
1778	American Revolutionary War	Affair at Little Egg Harbor	(United States)	15 Oct	British victory over Americans.
1778	Anglo-French War	Action of 20 October 1778	(Spain)	20 Oct	Indecisive naval battle between British and French.
1778	American Revolutionary War	Carleton's Raid	(United States)	24 Oct—14 Nov	British victory over Americans.
1778	American Revolutionary War	Battle of St. Lucia	(Saint Lucia)	15 Dec	British victory over French.
1778	American Revolutionary War	Capture of St. Lucia	(Saint Lucia)	18–28 Dec	British victory over French.
1778	American Revolutionary War	Capture of Savannah	(United States)	29 Dec	Loyalists capture Savannah, Georgia.
1778	Lekianoba	Battle of Ghartiskari	(Georgia (country))		A Georgian noblewoman, Ketevan Andronikashvili, defeats a band of marauding Lezgins with her Royal guard.
1779	First Anglo-Maratha War	Battle of Wadgaon	(India)	12–13 Jan	East India Company retreats to Bombay.
1779	War of the Bavarian Succession	Battle of Zuckmantel	(Czech Republic)	14 Jan	Austrian victory over Prussia.
1779	American Revolutionary War	Battle of Beaufort	(United States)	3 Feb	American victory over British.
1779	American Revolutionary War	Battle of Van Creek	(United States)	11 Feb	Loyalists defeat Patriots.
1779	American Revolutionary War	Battle of Kettle Creek	(United States)	14 Feb	Pickens defeats Loyalist brigade.
1779		Battle of Kealakekua Bay	(United States)	14 Feb	Death of James Cook.
1779	American Revolutionary War	Battle of Vincennes	(United States)	23–25 Feb	Americans capture fort.
1779	American Revolutionary War	Battle of Brier Creek	(United States)	3 March	Ashe loses 350 men near Augusta to British.
1779	Anglo-French War and American Revolutionary War	Invasion of Jersey	(United States)	1 May	British repel a French invasion.
1779	American Revolutionary War	Chesapeake raid	(United States)	10–24 May	British naval forces attempt to raid Chesapeake Bay.
1779	Anglo-French War	Action of 13 May 1779	(France)	13 May	British victory over French.
1779	American Revolutionary War	Battle of Chillicothe	(United States)	May	Americans destroy Shawnee settlement in Chillicothe, Ohio.
1779	American Revolutionary War	Battle of Moca	(Yemen)	8 June	British attempt to seize a French ambassador escorted by Portuguese.
1779	American Revolutionary War	Capture of Saint Vincent	(Saint Vincent and the Grenadines)	16–18 June	French victory over British.
1779	American Revolutionary War	Sullivan Expedition	(United States)	18 June—3 Oct	American attempt to end Iroquois involvement.
1779	American Revolutionary War	Battle of Stono Ferry	(United States)	20 June	British victory over Americans.
1779	American Revolutionary War	Great Siege of Gibraltar	(Gibraltar)	24 June 1779 – 7 Feb 1783	4-year siege, British hold out during a four-year siege.
1779		Battle of Khatu Shyamji	(India)	June	Rajput victory over Imperial army.
1779	American Revolutionary War	Capture of Grenada	(Grenada)	2–4 July	French victory over British.
1779	American Revolutionary War	Tryon's raid	(United States)	3-mid-July	British raid on towns in Connecticut is an eventual failure, with just a few towns burned.
1779	American Revolutionary War	Battle of Grenada	(Grenada)	6 July	French naval victory over British.
1779	American Revolutionary War	Battle of Norwalk	(United States)	12 July	Destruction of all but 6 houses in Norwalk, Connecticut.
1779	American Revolutionary War	Battle of Stony Point	(United States)	16 July	Wayne takes 700 British prisoners in bayonet attack with only 15 Patriot casualties.
1779	American Revolutionary War	Battle of Minisink	(United States)	19–22 July	British Loyalist, Imperial, and Iroquois victory over Americans.
1779	American Revolutionary War	Penobscot Expedition	(United States)	24 July—16 Aug	British victory over Americans.
1779	American Revolutionary War	Battle of Paulus Hook	(United States)	19 Aug	Lee drives British from New Jersey.
1779	American Revolutionary War	Battle of Newtown	(United States)	29 Aug	Americans defeat Iroquois.
1779	American Revolutionary War	Battle of Fort Bute	(United States)	7 Sep	Spanish victory over British forces.
1779	American Revolutionary War	Battle of Lake Pontchartrain	(United States)	10 Sep	American-Spanish troops led by Pickles capture West Florida from Great Britain.
1779	American Revolutionary War	Action of 11 September 1779	(United States)	11 Sep	French victory over British.
1779	American Revolutionary War	Boyd and Parker ambush	(United States)	13 Sep	British-Seneca victory over Americans.
1779	American Revolutionary War	Action of 14 September 1779	(Portugal)	14 Sep	British victory over Spanish off the Azores.
1779	American Revolutionary War	Capture of Cayo Cocina	(Belize)	15 Sep	Spanish capture St. George's Caye from British.
1779	American Revolutionary War	Siege of Savannah	(United States)	16 Sep—18 Oct	American siege on British-occupied Savannah fails.
1779	American Revolutionary War	Battle of Baton Rouge	(United States)	20–21 Sep	Spanish capture city from British-Waldeck forces.
1779	American Revolutionary War	Capture of Fort New Richmond	(United States)	21 Sep	Spanish capture the area from the British.
1779	American Revolutionary War	Battle of Flamborough Head	(England)	23 Sep	Pyrrhic Franco-American victory over British.
1779	American Revolutionary War	Second Battle of Ushant	(France)	6 Oct	French defeat British.
1779	American Revolutionary War	Battle of San Fernando de Omoa	(Honduras)	16 Oct—29 Nov	Spain withdraws from fortress.
1779	Anglo-Spanish War	Action of 11 November 1779	(Portugal)	11 Nov	British victory off Lisbon.
1779	American Revolutionary War	Action of 20 November 1779	(Portugal)	20 Nov	Another British victory off Lisbon.
1779	Apache-Mexico Wars	First Battle of Tucson	(United States)	9 Dec	Spanish victory over Apache warriors.
1779	American Revolutionary War	Action of 12 December 1779	(Honduras)	12 Dec	British victory off Honduras against Spanish.
1779	American Revolutionary War	Battle of Martinique	(Martinique)	18 Dec	British capture Martinique from French.
1779	American Revolutionary War	Battle of Guadeloupe	(Martinique)	21–22 Dec	British take Guadeloupe from French.
1779	Afghan–Sikh Wars	Battle of Rohtas	(Pakistan)	Dec	Durrani victory against various Sikh misls.
1779	American Revolutionary War	Capture of Río Hondo	(Belize)		Spanish attack British settlements and fail, then the British abandon settlements.
1780	American Revolutionary War	Action of 8 January 1780	(Spain)	8 Jan	British victory over Spanish.
1780	American Revolutionary War	Battle of Cape St. Vincent	(Portugal)	16 Jan	British fleet under Rodney destroys a smaller Spanish fleet under Lángara.
1780	American Revolutionary War	Raid on Elizabethtown and Newark	(United States)	25 Jan	British victory over Americans is ultimately unimportant in the course of the war.
1780	Afghan–Sikh Wars	Siege of Multan	(Pakistan)	Jan—18 Feb	Durrani take back city from Sikhs.
1780	American Revolutionary War	Battle of Young's House	(United States)	3 Feb	British victory over Americans.
1780	American Revolutionary War	Action of 24 February 1780	(Portugal)	24 Feb	British victory over Spanish.
1780	American Revolutionary War	Battle of Fort Charlotte	(United States)	2–14 March	Spanish victory over British.
1780	American Revolutionary War	San Juan Expedition	(Nicaragua)	17 March—8 Nov	Spanish victory over British.
1780	American Revolutionary War	Siege of Charleston	(United States)	29 March—12 May	Charleston, South Carolina surrenders to the British.
1780	American Revolutionary War	Battle of Monck's Corner	(United States)	14 April	British victory over Americans.
1780	American Revolutionary War	Battle of Martinique	(Martinique)	17 April	Indecisive naval battle between British and French.
1780	American Revolutionary War	Battle of Lenud's Ferry	(United States)	6 May	British victory over Americans.
1780	American Revolutionary War	Bird's invasion of Kentucky	(United States)	25 May—4 Aug	British and Shawnee capture Kentucky.
1780	American Revolutionary War	Battle of Saint Louis	(United States)	26 May	British unable to take town from Spanish.
1780	American Revolutionary War	Battle of Waxhaws	(United States)	29 May	British victory over Americans.
1780	American Revolutionary War	Action of 7 June 1780	(United States)	7 June	Inconclusive naval battle between British and France.
1780	American Revolutionary War	Battle of Connecticut Farms	(United States)	7 June	One of the last battles in the Northern US during the war.
1780	American Revolutionary War	Battle of Mobley's Meeting House	(United States)	8 June	Patriots defeat Loyalists.
1780	American Revolutionary War	Action of 15 June 1780	(Belgium)	15 June	British victory over French.
1780	American Revolutionary War	Battle of Ramsour's Mill	(United States)	20 June	Patriot victory over Loyalists.
1780	American Revolutionary War	Battle of Springfield	(United States)	23 June	Greene defeats British.
1780	American Revolutionary War	First Battle off Halifax	(Canada)	10 July	American victory over British.
1780	American Revolutionary War	Huck's Defeat	(United States)	12 July	Patriot victory over Loyalists. Christian Huck is defeated.
1780	American Revolutionary War	Battle of Bull's Ferry	(United States)	20–21 July	British victory over Americans.
1780	American Revolutionary War	Battle of Colson's Mill	(United States)	21 July	Patriot victory over Loyalists.
1780	American Revolutionary War	Battle of Rocky Mount	(United States)	31 July—1 Aug	Loyalist victory over Patriots.
1780	American Revolutionary War	Battle of Hanging Rock	(United States)	6 Aug	Patriot victory over Loyalists.
1780	American Revolutionary War	Battle of Piqua	(United States)	8 Aug	Pyrrhic victory for the Americans over the Shawnee, Lenape, Wyandot and Mingo.
1780	Anglo-French War	Action of 9 August 1780	(Portugal)	9 Aug	Franco-Spanish naval victory over the British.
1780	American Revolutionary War	Third Battle of Ushant	(France)	10 Aug	British naval victory over French.
1780	American Revolutionary War	Action of 13 August 1780	(Republic of Ireland)	13 Aug	British naval victory over French.
1780	American Revolutionary War	Battle of Camden	(United States)	16 Aug	Cornwallis crushes Gates; 900 patriots are killed.
1780	American Revolutionary War	Battle of Fishing Creek	(United States)	18 Aug	Tarleton defeats Sumter.
1780	American Revolutionary War	Battle of Musgrove Mill	(United States)	18 Aug	Patriot victory over Loyalists.
1780	Second Anglo-Mysore War	Battle of Pollilur	(India)	10 Sep	Tipu Sultan routs British.
1780	American Revolutionary War	Battle of Black Mingo	(United States)	14 Sep	Patriot victory over Loyalists.
1780	American Revolutionary War	Battle of Wahab's Plantation	(United States)	21 Sep	Patriot victory over Loyalists.
1780	American Revolutionary War	Battle of Charlotte	(United States)	26 Sep	British capture American-occupied Charlotte, North Carolina.
1780	American Revolutionary War	Action of 30 September 1780	(Bermuda)	30 Sep	British naval victory over French.
1780	American Revolutionary War	Battle of King's Mountain	(United States)	7 Oct	Patriots capture Loyalists.
1780	American Revolutionary War	Battle of Shallow Ford	(United States)	14 Oct	Patriots capture Loyalists.
1780	American Revolutionary War	Royalton raid	(Vermont Republic)	16 Oct	British defeat Vermont Republic.
1780	American Revolutionary War	Battle of Klock's Field	(United States)	19 Oct	No clear winner in a fight between Americans and British.
1780	American Revolutionary War	Battle of Tearcoat Swamp	(United States)	25 Oct	American victory over British.
1780	American Revolutionary War	Battle of Fishdam Ford	(United States)	9 Nov	American victory over British.
1780	Rebellion of Túpac Amaru II	Battle of Sangarará	(Peru)	18 Nov	Túpac Amaru II leads an uprising against Viceroyalty of Peru.
1780	American Revolutionary War	Battle of Blackstock's Farm	(United States)	20 Nov	Tarleton's first loss, allowing Patriots to send in Greene.
1780	American Revolutionary War	Battle of Fort St. George	(United States)	23 Nov	American victory over British.
1780		Siege of Kastania	(Greece)		Ottomans successfully besiege Maniots and massacre all but 100 residents.

== 1781–1800 ==
Year	War	Battle	Loc.	Date(s)	Description
1781	American Revolutionary War	Raid on Richmond	(United States)	1–19 Jan	Richmond, Virginia severely damaged by the British.
1781	American Revolutionary War	Action of 4 January 1781	(France)	4 Jan	British victory over France.
1781	Anglo-French War and American Revolutionary War	Battle of Jersey	(United Kingdom)	6 Jan	British victory over France.
1781	American Revolutionary War	Battle of Mobile	(United States)	7 Jan	British unable to retake city from Spain.
1781	American Revolutionary War	Battle of Cowpens	(United States)	17 Jan	Morgan defeats Tarleton. American victory over British loyalists.
1781	Fourth Anglo-Dutch War	Shirley's Gold Coast expedition	(Ghana)	Jan—Nov	Start of the Fourth Anglo-Dutch War.
1781	American Revolutionary War	Battle of Cowan's Ford	(United States)	1 Feb	British victory over Americans.
1781	American Revolutionary War	Battle of Torrence's Tavern	(United States)	1–2 Feb	British victory over Americans.
1781	Fourth Anglo-Dutch War	Capture of Sint Eustatius	(Netherlands)	3 Feb	British forces capture Dutch Sint Eustatius.
1781	Fourth Anglo-Dutch War	Action of 4 February 1781	(United Kingdom)	4 Feb	British victory over the Netherlands.
1781	Fourth Anglo-Dutch War	Raid on Essequibo and Demerara	(Guyana)	24–27 Feb	British raid Dutch Essequibo and Demerara.
1781	American Revolutionary War	Action of 25 February 1781	(Spain)	25 Feb	British victory over Spain.
1781	American Revolutionary War	Battle of Wetzell's Mill	(United States)	6 March	Inconclusive battle between British loyalists and Americans.
1781	American Revolutionary War	Skirmish at Waters Creek	(United States)	8 March	American victory over Great Britain.
1781	American Revolutionary War	Battle of Pensacola	(United States)	9 March—8 May	Spanish and French victory over Great Britain in Florida.
1781	American Revolutionary War	Battle of Guilford Court House	(United States)	15 March	Cornwallis achieves a Pyrrhic victory over Greene and Morgan. Great Britain defeats Americans.
1781	American Revolutionary War	Battle of Cape Henry	(United States)	16 March	British victory over France.
1781		Revolt of the Comuneros	(Colombia) / (Venezuela)	16 March—late 1781	Large revolt in Viceroyalty of New Granada against Spain.
1781	American Revolutionary War	Capture of HMS St. Fermin	(Spain)	4 April	Spain capture British ship.
1781	American Revolutionary War	Brodhead's Coshocton expedition	(United States)	7–20 April	Americans loot Lenape tribes.
1781	American Revolutionary War	Battle of Porto Praya	(Cape Verde)	16 April	French admiral Suffren damages English naval squadron.
1781	American Revolutionary War	Battle of Blandford	(United States)	25 April	British victory over Americans.
1781	American Revolutionary War	Battle of Hobkirk's Hill	(United States)	25 April	Greene defeats Lord Rawdon.
1781	Anglo-French War	Battle of Fort Royal	(France)	29–30 April	France defeats Great Britain.
1781	American Revolutionary War	Action of 1 May 1781	(France)	1 May	British victory over Spain.
1781	American Revolutionary War	Battle of Pine's Bridge	(United States)	14 May	British victory over Americans.
1781	American Revolutionary War	Battle of Blomindon	(Canada)	21 May	British victory over Americans.
1781	American Revolutionary War	Siege of Augusta	(United States)	22 May—6 June	Patriots hold city against British loyalists.
1781	American Revolutionary War	Invasion of Tobago	(Trinidad and Tobago) / (Saint Lucia)	24 May—2 June	French capture Tobago from Great Britain.
1781	Fourth Anglo-Dutch War	Action of 30 May 1781	(Portugal)	30 May	British victory over the Netherlands.
1781	American Revolutionary War	Battle of Spencer's Ordinary	(United States)	26 June	Inconclusive battle between the United States and Great Britain.
1781	Second Anglo-Mysore War	Battle of Porto Novo	(India)	1 July	British East India Company victory over the Kingdom of Mysore.
1781	American Revolutionary War	Battle of Green Spring	(United States)	6 July	British victory over Americans.
1781	American Revolutionary War	Francisco's Fight	(United States)	9–24 July	American victory over Great Britain.
1781	American Revolutionary War	Action of 21 July 1781	(Canada)	21 July	French victory over Great Britain.
1781	Fourth Anglo-Dutch War	Battle of Saldanha Bay	(South Africa)	21 July	British victory over the Netherlands.
1781	American Revolutionary War	Battle of the House in the Horseshoe	(United States)	29 July—5 Aug	British loyalist victory over Patriots.
1781	Fourth Anglo-Dutch War	Battle of Dogger Bank	At sea	5 Aug	Indecisive naval battle between Britain and the Dutch Republic.
1781	American Revolutionary War	Invasion of Minorca	(Spain)	19 Aug 1781 – 5 Feb 1782	Franco-Spanish victory over Great Britain.
1781	American Revolutionary War	Lochry's Defeat	(United States)	24 Aug	British-Native victory over Americans.
1781	Second Anglo-Mysore War	Battle of Pollilur	(India)	27 Aug	Kingdom of Mysore victory over Great Britain.
1781	American Revolutionary War	Raid on Annapolis Royal	(Canada)	29 Aug	American privateer victory over Great Britain.
1781	American Revolutionary War	Action of 2 September 1781	(United States)	2 Sep	British victory over France.
1781	American Revolutionary War	Battle of the Chesapeake	(United States)	5 Sep	French fleet under de Grasse defeats British fleet under Graves, sealing Cornwallis' fate and leading to his surrender in Yorktown.
1781	American Revolutionary War	Battle of Groton Heights	(United States)	6 Sep	British seize fort from Americans. Arnold triggers a gunpowder explosion.
1781	American Revolutionary War	Capture of HMS Savage	(United States)	6 Sep	American victory over Great Britain.
1781	American Revolutionary War	Battle of Eutaw Springs	(United States)	8 Sep	Greene is defeated. British loyalists defeat Americans.
1781	American Revolutionary War	Battle of Lindley's Mill	(United States)	13 Sep	British loyalist victory over Patriots.
1781	Second Anglo-Mysore War	Battle of Sholinghur	(India)	27 Sep	Great Britain defeats Kingdom of Mysore.
1781	American Revolutionary War	Battle of Yorktown	(United States)	28 Sep—19 Oct	French and Americans begin siege of British commander Cornwallis.
1781	American Revolutionary War	Battle of Fort Slongo	(United States)	3 Oct	Americans defeats Great Britain.
1781	Fourth Anglo-Dutch War and Second Anglo-Mysore War	Siege of Negapatam	(India)	21 Oct	First British major offensive military action on the Indian subcontinent. Great Britain captures Nagapattinam from the Netherlands.
1781	American Revolutionary War	Battle of Johnstown	(United States)	25 Oct	Patriot victory over Great Britain.
1781	American Revolutionary War	Fourth Battle of Ushant	(France)	12 Dec	French convoy is destroyed by British before escort ships can react.
1781		Jahriyya revolt	(China)		Jahriyya rebels in Xinjiang break into violence with the Khufiyya, who side with the Qing dynasty and the latter two crush the former.
1782	American Revolutionary War	Battle of Videau's Bridge	(United States)	3 Jan	British victory over Americans.
1782	Fourth Anglo-Dutch War	Capture of Trincomalee	(Sri Lanka)	11 Jan	British victory over the Netherlands.
1782	American Revolutionary War	Action of 15 January 1782	(Jamaica)	15 Jan	British victory over Spain.
1782	American Revolutionary War	Siege of Brimstone Hill	(Saint Kitts and Nevis)	19 Jan—12 Feb	French occupy Saint Kitts and Nevis from Great Britain.
1782	American Revolutionary War	Capture of Demerara and Essequibo	(Guyana)	22 Jan	French capture Demerara and Essequibo from Great Britain.
1782	American Revolutionary War	Battle of St. Kitts	(Saint Kitts and Nevis)	25–26 Jan	British outmaneuver French but are unable to save island.
1782	American Revolutionary War	Battle of Sadras	(India)	17 Feb	Suffren (12 ships) meets a British squadron under Hughes (9 ships). French strategic victory.
1782	American Revolutionary War	Battle of Wambaw	(United States)	24 Feb	British victory over Americans.
1782		Battle of Wuchale	(Ethiopia)	14 March	Emperor Tekle Giyorgis of Ethiopia pacifies a group of Oromo near Wuchale.
1782	American Revolutionary War	Battle of Roatán	(Honduras)	16 March	Spain defeats Great Britain.
1782	American Revolutionary War	Action of 16 March 1782	At sea	16 March	British victory over Spain.
1782	American Revolutionary War	Battle of Little Mountain	(United States)	22 March	Wyandots defeat Kentuckian settlers.
1782	American Revolutionary War	Battle of Delaware Bay	(United States)	8 April	American victory over Great Britain.
1782	American Revolutionary War	Battle of the Saintes	(Dominica)	12 April	Rodney defeats de Grasse by breaking through the French line.
1782	Anglo-French War and American Revolutionary War	Battle of Providien	(Sri Lanka)	12 April	French and English squadrons clash in an indecisive engagement.
1782	American Revolutionary War	Battle of the Black River	(Nicaragua)	13 April—23 Aug	British take over Spanish Nicaraguan forts.
1782	American Revolutionary War	Fifth Battle of Ushant	(France)	20–21 April	British victory over France.
1782	Apache-Mexico Wars	Second Battle of Tucson	(United States)	1 May	Spanish victory over Apache warriors.
1782	American Revolutionary War	First Capture of the Bahamas	(The Bahamas)	6-late May	Spain takes the Bahamas from Great Britain.
1782	American Revolutionary War	Crawford expedition	(United States)	25 May—12 June	Natives and British defeat Americans.
1782	American Revolutionary War	Battle off Halifax	(Canada)	28–29 May	British victory over Americans.
1782	American Revolutionary War	Raid on Chester, Nova Scotia	(Canada)	30 June	British victory over Americans.
1782	American Revolutionary War	Raid on Lunenburg, Nova Scotia	(Canada)	1 July	American victory over Great Britain.
1782	American Revolutionary War	Battle of Negapatam	(India)	6 July	Indecisive engagement between British and French fleets.
1782	American Revolutionary War	Action of 29 July 1782	(United States)	29 July	Indecisive engagement between British and French fleets.
1782	Unification of the Hawaiian Islands	Battle of Mokuʻōhai	(United States)	July	Kamehameha I defeats Kīwalaʻō in a struggle to control Hawai'i, beginning Unification of the Hawaiian Islands.
1782	American Revolutionary War	Hudson Bay expedition	(Canada)	8 Aug	French victory over Great Britain.
1782	American Revolutionary War	Action of 12 August 1782	(Sri Lanka)	12 Aug	Indecisive naval battle between France and Great Britain.
1782	American Revolutionary War	Battle of Blue Licks	(United States)	19 Aug	British victory over Americans.
1782	American Revolutionary War	Battle of the Combahee River	(United States)	27 Aug	British victory over Americans.
1782	American Revolutionary War	Battle of Trincomalee	(Sri Lanka)	3 Sep	British fleet under Hughes damages French fleet under Suffren but withdraws.
1782	American Revolutionary War	Action of 4 September 1782	(France)	4 Sep	British victory over France.
1782	American Revolutionary War	Action of 5 September 1782	(United States)	5 Sep	Inconclusive naval battle between France and Great Britain.
1782	American Revolutionary War	Action of 10 September 1782	(Malaysia)	10 Sep	Inconclusive naval battle between France and Great Britain.
1782	American Revolutionary War	Second Siege of Fort Henry	(United States)	11–13 Sep	Failed British attempt to capture Ohio valley from Americans.
1782	American Revolutionary War	Action of 15 September 1782	(United States)	15 Sep	British victory over France.
1782	American Revolutionary War	Action of 18 October 1782	(Dominican Republic) / (Haiti)	17–18 Oct	British victory over France.
1782	American Revolutionary War	Battle of Cape Spartel	(Morocco)	20 Oct	Indecisive naval battle between Great Britain and a coalition of Spain and France.
1782	American Revolutionary War	Battle of James Island	(United States)	14 Nov	British victory over Americans.
1782	American Revolutionary War	Battle of Kedges Strait	(United States)	30 Nov	British victory over Americans.
1782	American Revolutionary War	Action of 6 December 1782	(France)	6 Dec	British victory over France.
1782	American Revolutionary War	Action of 12 December 1782	(Spain)	12 Dec	British victory over France and United States.
1782		Muharram Rebellion	(Bangladesh)	16 Dec	A failed independence attempt by Bengali Muslims marks the first anti-British rebellion to take place in the British Raj.
1782	American Revolutionary War	Battle of the Delaware Capes	(United States)	20–21 Dec	British victory over Americans.
1782	American Revolutionary War	Battle of Cedar Bridge	(United States)	27 Dec	One of the last skirmishes in the war.
1783	American Revolutionary War	Action of 2 January 1783	(Haiti)	2 Jan	Inconclusive French-British engagement.
1783	American Revolutionary War	Action of 22 January 1783	(United States)	22 Jan	British victory over France.
1783	American Revolutionary War	Action of 15 February 1783	(France)	15 Feb	British victory over France.
1783	American Revolutionary War	Action of 17 February 1783	At sea	17 Feb	British victory over Spain.
1783	American Revolutionary War	Battle of Grand Turk	(United Kingdom)	9 March	French victory over Great Britain.
1783	Mughal-Sikh Wars	Battle of Delhi	(India)	11 March	Sikh Empire captures Delhi from the Mughals.
1783		Kuban Nogai Uprising	(Russia)	8 April—1 Oct	Last uprising by the Nogais against Russia.
1783	American Revolutionary War	Capture of the Bahamas	(The Bahamas)	14–16 April	British recapture the Bahamas from Spain.
1783	American Revolutionary War	Colbert raid	(United States)	17 April	Spanish-Quapaw victory over British-Chickasaw forces.
1783	American Revolutionary War	Battle of Cuddalore	(India)	20 June	French fleet drives British fleet off shore of Cuddalore. Last of the five battles between Suffren and Hughes.
1783		Bani Utbah invasion of Bahrain	(Bahrain)	23 July	End of Persian rule in Bahrain.
1783	Spanish-Algerian war	Bombardment of Algiers	(Algeria)	4–8 Aug	Algerian victory over Spain.
1783		Battle of Halani	(Pakistan)		Establishment of the Talpur dynasty.
1784	Mexican Apache Wars and Mexican Navajo Wars	Fourth Battle of Tucson	(United States)	21 March	Apache/Navajo victory over Spanish forces.
1784	Mexican Apache Wars and Mexican Navajo Wars	Battle of the Catalina River	(United States)	21 March	Spanish victory over the Apache and Navajo.
1784		Bombardment of Sousse	(Tunisia)	21 June 1784—1786	Two-year bombardment along the Tunisian coast.
1784	Spanish-Algerian war	Bombardment of Algiers	(Algeria)	12 July	Algerian defeat by Spanish-Neapolitan-Maltese-Portuguese forces.
1784	Patriottentijd	Kettle War	(Netherlands)	8 Oct	Confrontation between Holy Roman Empire and Dutch troops.
1784		Revolt of Horea, Cloșca and Crișan	(Romania)	31 Oct—14 Dec	Failed peasant rebellion in Transylvania.
1784	Omani Colonization of Africa	Oman–Zanzibar war	(Tanzania)		Oman forcibly recaptures Zanzibar.
1785	Tây Sơn wars and Siamese–Vietnamese Wars	Battle of Rạch Gầm-Xoài Mút	(Vietnam)	19–20 Jan	Tây Sơn win a defensive victory, forcing Saimese-Cambodian armies back to Laos.
1785	Sheikh Mansur Movement	Battle of the Sunja	(Russia)	4 July	Pro-Mansur Chechen fighters defeat Russians.
1786	Northwest Indian War	Battle of the Embarras River	(United States)	15 April	Americans defeat Piankeshaw, Miami and Wea.
1786		Shays' Rebellion	(United States)	29 Aug 1786 – Feb 1787	Failed rebellion caused by overtaxation.
1786	Northwest Indian War	Logan's raid	(United States)	12 Oct	Kentucky militia attacks Shawnee.
1786	Indian independence movement	Revolt of Radharam	(India)		British defeat Indian insurrectionists.
1787	Patriottentijd	Battle of Jutphaas	(Netherlands)	9 May	Patriots defeat the Orangists.
1787	Patriottentijd	Bijltjesoproer	(Netherlands)	30 May	Failed rebellion of Orangists in Patriot-controlled Amsterdam.
1787	Patriottentijd	Prussian invasion of Holland	(Netherlands)	13 Sep—10 Oct	Prussia swoops in to back the Orangists in Holland.
1787	Sheikh Mansur movement and Russo-Circassian War	Battle of Jilehoy	(Russia)	22 Sep	Russians defeat Circassians.
1787	Sheikh Mansur movement	Battle of the Kuban River	(Russia)	25 Sep	Inconclusive battle between the Circassians and Russia.
1787		Battle of Lalsot	(India)		Jaipur and Marwar defeat the Marathas of the Gwalior State and the Mughals.
1787	Russo-Turkish War	Battle of Kinburn	(Ukraine)	12 Oct	Russian victory over the Ottoman Empire.
1787		Abaco Slave Revolt	(The Bahamas)	1787 or 1788	First slave revolt in British Bahamas.
1788	Russo-Turkish War and Austro-Turkish War	Naval actions at the Siege of Ochakov	(Ukraine)	21 March—9 July	Skirmishes between Russia and the Ottoman Empire.
1788	Russo-Turkish War and Austro-Turkish War	Siege of Ochakov	(Ukraine)	31 May—6 Dec	Russian victory over the Ottoman Empire.
1788	Mexican Apache Wars	Battle of the Pinal Mountains	(United States)	Mid-June	Spain defeats Apache.
1788	Battles of the Zemene Mesafint	Battle of Madab	(Ethiopia)	June	In Ethiopia, Ali, Hailu Eshte, and Tekle Giyorgis I defeat the allied forces of Haile Yosadiq, Gebre, and Wolde Gabriel. Wolde Gabriel is killed in battle and the pretender Baeda Maryam is captured.
1788	Russo-Turkish War and Austro-Turkish War	Siege of Khotin	(Ukraine)	2 July—19 Sep	Austria and Russia capture Khotyn from the Ottoman Empire.
1788	Russo-Turkish War and Austro-Turkish War	Battle of Fidonisi	(Ukraine)	14 July	Russian victory over Ottomans.
1788	Russo-Turkish War and Austro-Turkish War	Battle of Mehadia	(Romania)	17–28 Aug	Ottoman Empire defeats Austria.
1788	Russo-Turkish War and Austro-Turkish War	Battle of Karánsebes	(Romania)	21–22 Sep	Austrian forces mistakenly fire at their own men, thinking they are Ottomans. Allegedly, 10,000 Austrians are dead before the Ottomans arrive to capture Caransebeș from Austria.
1788	Russo-Swedish War	Battle of Kvistrum	(Sweden)	29 Sep	Danish-Norwegian victory over Sweden in a skirmish.
1788		Battle of Chaksana	(India)		Mughals force Marathas to retreat.
1789	Tây Sơn wars and Ten Great Campaigns	Battle of Ngọc Hồi-Đống Đa	(Vietnam)	28 Jan—3 Feb	End of Lê dynasty, the Chinese Qing dynasty retreats from Vietnam and recognizes Tây Sơn dynasty.
1789		Menashi–Kunashir rebellion	(Japan)	May	Ainu in the Kuril Islands attack Japanese Wajin traders.
1789	Russo-Swedish War	Battle of Porrassalmi	(Finland)	13 June	Sweden defeats Russia.
1789	Russo-Swedish War	Battle of Uttismalm	(Finland)	28 June	Sweden defeats Russia.
1789	French Revolution	Storming of the Bastille	(France)	14 July	French rebels storm Bastille, marking one of the most famous moments of the French Revolution.
1789	Russo-Swedish War	Battle of Kaipiais	(Finland)	15 July	Russia defeats Sweden.
1789	Russo-Swedish War	Battle of Parkumäki	(Finland)	21 July	Sweden defeats Russia.
1789	Russo-Swedish War	Battle of Öland	(Sweden)	26 July	The Russian navy defeats Sweden.
1789	Russo-Turkish War and Austro-Turkish War	Battle of Focșani	(Romania)	1 Aug	Russia and Austria defeat the Ottoman Empire.
1789	Russo-Swedish War	First Battle of Svensksund	(Finland)	24 Aug	Russian naval victory over Sweden.
1789	Russo-Turkish War and Austro-Turkish War	Siege of Belgrade	(Serbia)	15 Sep—8 Oct	Austrians take Belgrade from the Ottoman Empire.
1789	Russo-Turkish War and Austro-Turkish War	Battle of Rymnik	(Romania)	22 Sep	Austro-Russian victory over the Ottoman Empire.
1789	Russo-Swedish War	Battle of Elgsö	(Finland)	30 Sep	Swedish victory over Russia.
1789	Brabant Revolution	Battle of Turnhout	(Belgium)	27 Oct	Belgian rebels defeat Austrian army.
1789	Brabant Revolution	Four Days of Ghent	(Belgium)	13–16 Nov	Flemish and Brabantine rebels kick out Holy Roman army.
1789	Third Anglo-Mysore War	Battle of Nedumkotta	(India)	28 Dec	Travancore defeats the Kingdom of Mysore.
1790	Sheikh Mansur movement and Russo-Turkish War	Anapa Campaign	(Russia)	10 Feb—4 May	Russia retreats with heavy casualties after a failed attempt to capture Anapa fortress from the Sheikh Mansur movement and the Ottoman Empire.
1790	Sheikh Mansur movement and Russo-Turkish War	Battle of the Shibza River	(Russia)	15 March	Russia defeats the Ottoman Empire and the army of Sheikh Mansur.
1790	Russo-Swedish War	Battle of Valkeala	(Finland)	28 April—5 May	Swedish victory over Russia.
1790	Russo-Swedish War	Battle of Partakoski	(Finland)	30 April	Swedish victory over Russia.
1790	Russo-Swedish War	Battle of Reval	(Estonia)	13 May	The Russian navy defeats Sweden.
1790	Russo-Swedish War	Battle of Fredrikshamn	(Finland)	15 May	The Swedish navy defeats Russia.
1790	Russo-Turkish War	Battle of Andros	(Greece)	17–18 May	The Russian navy under Katsonis is defeated by Ottomans.
1790	Russo-Swedish War	Battle of Keltis	(Finland)	19–20 May	Swedish victory over Russia.
1790	Austro-Turkish War	Siege of Giurgiu	(Romania)	30 May—11 June	Ottomans defeat Habsburgs.
1790	Russo-Swedish War	Battle of Savitaipale	(Finland)	3 June	Russia defeats Sweden.
1790	Russo-Swedish War	Battle of Kronstadt	(Russia)	3–4 June	Indecisive naval battle between Sweden and Russia.
1790	Russo-Swedish War	Battle of Uransari	(Russia)	16 June	Swedish naval victory over Russia.
1790	Deccan wars	Battle of Patan	(India)	20 June	Maratha-Gwaliori victory over the Kingdom of Amber and the Kingdom of Marwar.
1790	Croatian–Ottoman wars and Ottoman–Habsburg wars	Relief of Cetingrad	(Croatia)	22 June—20 July	Croatia is freed from Ottoman rule after 200 years. Austria captures Cetingrad.
1790	Austro-Turkish War	Battle of Calafat	(Romania)	26 June	Habsburgs defeat Ottomans.
1790	Russo-Swedish War	Battle of Björkösund	(Russia)	2–3 July	The Swedish navy defeats Russia.
1790	Russo-Swedish War	Battle of Vyborg Bay	(Russia)	4 July	Swedish manage to escape but with heavy losses from the Russian navy.
1790	Russo-Swedish War	Second Battle of Svensksund	(Finland)	9–10 July	Swedish naval victory over Russia.
1790	Russo-Turkish War	Battle of Kerch Strait	(Russia)	19 July	Russian naval victory over the Ottoman Empire.
1790		Saxon Peasants' Revolt	(Germany)	July—Sep	Failed uprising by Saxon peasants.
1790	Russo-Turkish War	Battle of Tendra	(Ukraine)	8–9 Sep	Russian naval victory over the Ottoman Empire.
1790		Battle of Merta	(India)	10 Sep	Gwalior State defeats Marwar.
1790	Third Anglo-Mysore War	Battle of Sittimungulum	(India)	13–15 Sep	Mysoreans defeat Great Britain.
1790	Third Anglo-Mysore War	Siege of Darwar	(India)	18 Sep	British-Maratha victory over the Kingdom of Mysore.
1790	Brabant Revolution	Battle of Falmagne	(Belgium)	22 Sep	Austria defeats the United Belgian States.
1790	Hispano-Moroccan War	Siege of Ceuta	(Spain)	25 Sep 1790 – 14 Sep 1791	Year-long siege where Ceuta escapes Moroccan monument. Morocco fails to capture Ceuta from Spain.
1790	Sheikh Mansur movement and Russo-Turkish War	Battle of the Tokhtamysh River	(Russia)	30 Sep	Russia defeats the Ottoman Empire and the forces of Sheikh Mansur.
1790	Northwest Indian War	Battle of Fort Wayne	(United States)	18 Oct	Little Turtle and Miamis defeat troops under Harmar and St. Clair.
1790	Third Anglo-Mysore War	Siege of Koppal	(India)	28 Oct	British-Hyderabadi victory over the Kingdom of Mysore.
1790	Third Anglo-Mysore War	Battle of Tirurangadi	(India)	7–12 Dec	Great Britain and Travancore defeat the Kingdom of Mysore.
1790	Third Anglo-Mysore War	Battle of Calicut	(India)	7–12 Dec	Great Britain and Travancore defeat the Kingdom of Mysore.
1790	Third Anglo-Mysore War	Capture of Cannanore	(India)	17 Dec	British secure Malabar Coast from the Kingdom of Mysore.
1790	Russo-Turkish War	Siege of Izmail	(Ukraine)	22 Dec	Russian victory over the Ottoman Empire.
1790	Unification of the Hawaiian Islands	Battles of East Hawaiʻi	(United States)		Unknown results between the armies of Kamehameha I and Keawemauhili versus Keōua Kūʻahuʻula.
1790	Unification of the Hawaiian Islands	Battle of Kepaniwai	(United States)		Although a battlefield victory for Kamehameha I over Kalanikūpule's forces, it was strategically inconclusive, as it failed to secure permanent control of Maui.
1791	Third Anglo-Mysore War	Siege of Bangalore	(India)	5 Feb—21 March	British victory over the Kingdom of Mysore.
1791	Third Anglo-Mysore War	Battle of Arakere	(India)	15 May	Mysorean victory over Great Britain.
1791	Third Anglo-Mysore War	Siege of Coimbatore	(India)	May	Mysorean victory over Great Britain and Travancore.
1791	Russo-Turkish War	Battle of Măcin	(Romania)	10 July	Russia defeats the Ottoman Empire.
1791	Northwest Indian War	Battle of Kenapacomaqua	(United States)	7 Aug	American victory over Wea.
1791	Russo-Turkish War	Battle of Cape Kaliakra	(Bulgaria)	11 Aug	The Russian navy defeats the Ottoman Empire.
1791		1791 slave rebellion	(Haiti)	Aug	Failed slave rebellion in French Haiti.
1791	Unification of the Hawaiian Islands	Battle of Kawaihae	(United States)	Summer	Kamehameha I captures and kills Keōua Kūʻahuʻula and his warriors.
1791	Northwest Indian War	Battle of the Wabash	(United States)	4 Nov	St. Clair is defeated by Native Americans of the Northwestern Confederacy.
1791	Third Anglo-Mysore War	Battle of Tellicherry	(India)	18 Nov	Great Britain defeats France.
1791	Third Anglo-Mysore War	Capture of Hooly Honore	(India)	19–21 Dec	British-Maratha victory over the Kingdom of Mysore.
1791	Third Anglo-Mysore War	Capture of Shimoga	(India)	29 Dec 1791 – 3 Jan 1792	British-Maratha victory over the Kingdom of Mysore.
1792	Third Anglo-Mysore War	Siege of Seringapatam	(India)	5 Feb—18 March	Kingdom of Mysore cedes half its land to Britain.
1792	Haitian Revolution	Battle of Croix-des-Bouquets	(Haiti)	22 March	Insurgent black slaves and free coloured people defeat France.
1792	War of the First Coalition	First Battle of Quiévrain	(Belgium)	28 April	French victory over Austria.
1792	War of the First Coalition	Capture of Porrentruy	(Switzerland)	28 April	France captures Porrentruy, capital of the Bishopric of Basel. It was defended by Austria. Porrentruy is incorporated into the French occupation zone.
1792	War of the First Coalition	Battle of Marquain	(Belgium)	29 April	Austrian victory over France.
1792	War of the First Coalition	Second Battle of Quiévrain	(Belgium)	30 April	Austrian victory results in a chaotic retreat by the French.
1792	Polish–Russian War of 1792	Battle of Opsa	(Belarus)	25–26 May	Russia victory over Poland-Lithuania.
1792	Polish–Russian War of 1792	Battle of Mir	(Belarus)	11 June	Russia victory over Poland-Lithuania.
1792	Polish–Russian War of 1792	Battle of Boruszkowce	(Ukraine)	14 June	Russia victory over Poland-Lithuania.
1792	Polish–Russian War of 1792	Battle of Zieleńce	(Ukraine)	18 June	Poniatowski wins a battle against a Russian army group under command of General Markov.
1792	Polish–Russian War of 1792	Battle of Dubienka	(Poland)	18 July	Poland-Lithuania withdraws after a battle with Russia.
1792	War of the First Coalition	Siege of Thionville	(France)	24 Aug—16 Oct	French Republican troops hold the town of Thionville, repelling an attack by Austrians.
1792	War of the First Coalition	Battle of Verdun	(France)	29 Aug—2 Sep	Prussians defeat French Revolutionaries.
1792	War of the First Coalition	Battle of Valmy	(France)	20 Sep	French win against a coalition of Prussia, Austria and French Royalists, and proceed to declare war on Europe.
1792	War of the First Coalition	Siege of Lille	(France)	25 Sep—8 Oct	French Republican forces hold the town of Lille, repelling an attack by Austrians.
1792		Huilliche uprising of 1792	(Chile)	Sep 1792 – 14 Jan 1793	The Huilliche homeland Futahuillimapu comes under Spanish control.
1792	War of the First Coalition	First Siege of Mainz	(Germany)	18–21 Oct	France captures Mainz, capital of the Electorate of Mainz. French attempt to make a democratic state in Germany.
1792	War of the First Coalition	Battle of Jemappes	(Belgium)	6 Nov	French army, under Dumouriez, defeats Austrians under Saxe-Tenchen.
1792	War of the First Coalition	Battle of Limburg	(Germany)	9 Nov	French victory over Prussia.
1792	War of the First Coalition	Battle of Anderlecht	(Belgium)	13 Nov	French victory over Austria.
1792	War of the First Coalition	French expedition to Sardinia	(Italy)	21 Dec 1792 – 25 May 1793	Sardinia holds independence.
1792	Conflicts between the Regency of Algiers and Morocco	Capture of the Rif	(Morocco)		The Moroccan region of Rif is held by Algeria for 3 years.
1793	French Revolutionary Wars	Childers Incident	(France)	2 Jan	Entrance of Britain into the French Revolution. French cannon-fire damages a British warship.
1793	Haitian Revolution	Battle of La Tannerie	(Haiti)	18 Jan	French Republicans defeat French Royalists.
1793	Haitian Revolution	Battle of Morne Pelé	(Haiti)	Jan	French Republicans defeat French Royalists.
1793	War of the First Coalition	First Battle of Aldenhoven	(Germany)	1 March	Austrian victory over France.
1793	War of the First Coalition	Siege of Maastricht	(Netherlands)	2 March	Victory of a coalition of the Netherlands, French Royalists, Austria and Prussia over France.
1793	War in the Vendée	Battle of Saint-Florent-le-Vieil	(France)	12 March	French Royalists defeat French Republicans.
1793	War in the Vendée	Battle of Jallais	(France)	13 March	French Royalists defeat French Republicans.
1793	War in the Vendée	First Battle of Cholet	(France)	15 March	French Royalists defeat French Republicans.
1793	War in the Vendée	Battle of Coron	(France)	16 March	French Royalists defeat French Republicans.
1793	War in the Vendée	First Battle of Chantonnay	(France)	17 March	French Republicans defeat French Royalists.
1793	War of the First Coalition	Battle of Neerwinden	(Belgium)	18 March	Austrians defeat French army.
1793	War in the Vendée	Battle of Pont-Charrault	(France)	19 March	French Royalists defeat French Republicans.
1793	War in the Vendée	Battle of Les Sables-d'Olonne	(France)	29 March	French Republicans defeat French Royalists.
1793	War of the First Coalition	Siege of Condé	(France)	8 April—12 July	Coalition victory. Austria and French Royalists capture Condé-sur-l'Escaut from France.
1793	War in the Vendée	Battle of Chemillé	(France)	11 April	French Royalists defeat French Republicans.
1793	Haitian Revolution	Siege of Port-au-Prince	(Haiti)	12–14 April	French Republican victory over French Royalists.
1793	War in the Vendée	Battle of Aubiers	(France)	13 April	French Royalists defeat French Republicans.
1793	French Revolutionary Wars	Second Siege of Mainz	(Germany)	14 April—23 July	Prussian attempt to dissolve Republic of Mainz. Prussia, Austria, Saxony, Hesse-Kassel, Hesse-Darmstadt, the Palatinate and Saxe-Weimar capture Mainz from France.
1793	War in the Vendée	Battle of Vezins	(France)	19 April	French Royalists defeat French Republicans.
1793	War of the Pyrenees	Battle of Céret	(France)	20 April	Spain defeats France.
1793	War in the Vendée	Battle of Beaupréau	(France)	22 April	French Royalists defeat French Republicans.
1793	War in the Vendée	Battle of Thouars	(France)	5 May	French Royalists defeat French Republicans.
1793	War of the First Coalition	Battle of Raismes	(France)	8–9 May	Coalition victory. Austria, Great Britain and Prussia defeat France.
1793	War in the Vendée	Battle of La Châtaigneraie	(France)	13 May	French Royalists defeat French Republicans.
1793	War in the Vendée	Battle of Palluau	(France)	15 May	French Republicans defeat French Royalists.
1793	War in the Vendée	First Battle of Fontenay-le-Comte	(France)	17 May	French Royalists defeat French Republicans.
1793	War of the Pyrenees	Battle of Mas Deu	(France)	17–19 May	Spanish victory over France.
1793	War of the First Coalition	Battle of Famars	(France)	23 May	Coalition victory. Austria, Hanover and Great Britain defeat France.
1793	War in the Vendée	Second Battle of Fontenay-le-Comte	(France)	25 May	French Royalists defeat French Republicans.
1793	War of the First Coalition	Siege of Valenciennes	(France)	25 May—27 July	Coalition victory. Great Britain, Austria and Hanover capture Valenciennes from France.
1793	War of the First Coalition	Battle of Veurne	(Belgium)	31 May	France defeats Austria
1793	War in the Vendée	Battle of Doué	(France)	7 June	French Royalists defeat French Republicans.
1793	War in the Vendée	Battle of Montreuil-Bellay	(France)	8–9 June	French Royalists defeat French Republicans.
1793	French Revolutionary Wars	First Battle of Saorgio	(France)	8–12 June	Austro-Sardinian victory over France.
1793	War of the First Coalition	First Battle of Arlon	(Belgium)	9 June	French victory over Austria.
1793	War in the Vendée	Battle of Machecoul	(France)	10 June	French Royalists defeat French Republicans.
1793	War in the Vendée	Battle of Saumur	(France)	11 June	French Royalists defeat French Republicans.
1793	War of the First Coalition	Action of 18 June 1793	(England)	18 June	British victory over France.
1793	Haitian Revolution	Battle of Cap-Français	(Haiti)	20–22 June	French Republicans defeat French Royalists.
1793	War in the Vendée	Battle of Nantes	(France)	29 June	French Republicans defeat French Royalists.
1793	War in the Vendée	First Battle of Châtillon	(France)	5 July	French Royalist victory over French Republicans.
1793	French Revolutionary Wars	Battle of Brécourt	(France)	13–14 July	French government forces of The Mountain defeat rebel Girondins.
1793	War in the Vendée	Battle of Martigné-Briand	(France)	15 July	French Republicans defeat French Royalists.
1793	War of the Pyrenees	Battle of Perpignan	(France)	17 July	French victory over Spain.
1793	War in the Vendée	Battle of Vihiers	(France)	18 July	French Royalists defeat French Republicans.
1793	War in the Vendée	Battle of Luçon	(France)	30 July	French Republicans defeat French Royalists.
1793	War of the First Coalition	Action of 31 July 1793	(United States)	31 July	Inconclusive naval battle between Great Britain and France.
1793	French Revolutionary Wars	Siege of Pondicherry	(India)	1–23 Aug	British victory. Great Britain captures Pondicherry from France.
1793	War of the First Coalition	Battle of Caesar's Camp	(France)	7–8 Aug	Coalition victory. Austria, Great Britain and Hanover defeat France.
1793	War of the First Coalition	Siege of Lyon	(France)	8 Aug—9 Oct	French Republicans capture Lyon from French Royalists.
1793	War in the Vendée	Battle of Luçon	(France)	14 Aug	French Republicans defeat French Royalists.
1793	War of the First Coalition	Battle of Lincelles	(France)	17 Aug	Coalition victory. Great Britain and the Netherlands defeat France.
1793	War of the First Coalition	Siege of Landau	(Germany)	20 Aug—23 Dec	French victory. Prussia fails to capture Landau from France.
1793	War of the First Coalition	Siege of Dunkirk	(France)	24 Aug—8 Sep	French victory. Great Britain, Austria, Hanover and Hesse-Kassel fail to capture Dunkirk from France.
1793	War of the First Coalition	Siege of Le Quesnoy	(France)	28 Aug—13 Sep	Coalition victory. Austria and French Royalists capture Le Quesnoy from France.
1793	War of the First Coalition	Siege of Toulon	(France)	29 Aug—19 Dec	Napoleon's first battle. French Republicans defeat a combined Allied force in a crucial siege.
1793	War in the Vendée	Battle of Chantonnay	(France)	5 Sep	French Royalist victory over French Republicans.
1793	War of the First Coalition	Battle of Hondschoote	(France)	6–8 Sep	French army under Houchard defeats British, Hanoverians and Hessians under Wallmoden.
1793	War in the Vendée	Battle of Port-Saint-Père	(France)	10 Sep	French Republicans defeat French Royalists.
1793	French Revolutionary Wars	Battle of Avesnes-le-Sec	(France)	12 Sep	Austria defeats France.
1793	French Revolutionary Wars	Battle of Menin	(Belgium)	12–13 Sep	French victory over the Netherlands and Austria.
1793	War of the First Coalition	Battle of Méribel	(France)	13 Sep	Combined Savoy, Piedmont and Valdot forces fight the French occupying Savoy.
1793	War of the First Coalition	Battle of Pirmasens	(Germany)	14 Sep	Prussian victory over France.
1793	War in the Vendée	Battle of Vrines	(France)	14 Sep	French Republicans defeat French Royalists.
1793	French Revolutionary Wars	Battle of Epierre	(France)	15 Sep	France defeats Sardinia.
1793	War of the First Coalition	First Battle of Courtrai	(Belgium)	15 Sep	Coalition victory. Austria defeats France.
1793	War in the Vendée	Battle of Montaigu	(France)	16 Sep	French Republicans defeat French Royalists.
1793	War of the Pyrenees	Battle of Peyrestortes	(France)	17 Sep	French victory over Spain.
1793	War in the Vendée	Battle of Coron	(France)	18 Sep	French Royalist victory over French Republicans.
1793	War in the Vendée	Battle of Tiffauges	(France)	19 Sep	French Royalist victory over French Republicans.
1793	War in the Vendée	Battle of Pont-Barré	(France)	20 Sep	French Royalist victory over French Republicans.
1793	War in the Vendée	Battle of Montaigu	(France)	21 Sep	French Royalist victory over French Republicans.
1793	War in the Vendée	Battle of Saint-Fulgent	(France)	22 Sep	French Royalist victory over French Republicans.
1793	War in the Vendée	Battle of Pallet	(France)	22 Sep	French Republicans defeat French Royalists.
1793	War of the Pyrenees	Battle of Truillas	(France)	22 Sep	Spanish victory over France.
1793	French Revolution	Siege of Maubeuge	(France)	30 Sep—16 Oct	French victory over Austria and the Netherlands.
1793	Haitian Revolution	Battle of Marmelade	(Haiti)	Summer	Spanish and Haitians defeat French Republicans.
1793	French Revolutionary Wars	Raid on Genoa	(Italy)	5 Oct	British victory over France.
1793	War in the Vendée	Battle of Moulin-aux-Chèvres Forest	(France)	9 Oct	French Republicans defeat French Royalists.
1793	War in the Vendée	Second Battle of Châtillon	(France)	11 Oct	Inconclusive battle between French Royalists and French Republicans.
1793	War in the Vendée	First Battle of Noirmoutier	(France)	12 Oct	French Royalist victory over French Republicans.
1793	War of the First Coalition	First Battle of Wissembourg	(France)	13 Oct	Austria, Hesse-Kassel and French Royalists defeat France.
1793	War of the Pyrenees	First Battle of Boulou	(France)	14–15 Oct	Spain and Portugal defeat France.
1793	War of the First Coalition	Siege of Fort-Louis	(France)	14 Oct—14 Nov	Coalition victory. Austria, Hesse-Darmstadt and Bavaria capture Fort-Louis from France.
1793	War in the Vendée	Battle of La Tremblaye	(France)	15 Oct	French Republican victory over French Royalists.
1793	War of the First Coalition	Battle of Wattignies	(France)	15–16 Oct	French army under Jourdan and Carnot defeats Austrians under Saxe-Coburg.
1793	War in the Vendée	Second Battle of Cholet	(France)	17 Oct	French Republican victory over French Royalists.
1793	War of the First Coalition	Battle of Gilette	(France)	19 Oct	French army under Dugommier defeats Austrians, Piedmontese and Sardinian army.
1793	French Revolutionary Wars	Action of 20 October 1793	(France)	20 Oct	British victory over France.
1793	French Revolutionary Wars	Action of 22 October 1793	(Italy)	22 Oct	Inconclusive naval battle between Great Britain and France.
1793	War in the Vendée	Battle of Laval	(France)	22 Oct	French Royalists defeat French Republicans.
1793	French Revolutionary Wars	Action of 24 October 1793	At sea	24 Oct	French victory over Great Britain.
1793	War in the Vendée	Battle of Croix-Bataille	(France)	24–25 Oct	French Royalists defeat French Republicans.
1793	War in the Vendée	Battle of Entrames	(France)	27 Oct	French Royalists defeat French Republicans.
1793	French Revolutionary Wars	Battle of Veurne	(Belgium)	31 Oct	France defeats Austria.
1793	War in the Vendée	Battle of Ernée	(France)	2 Nov	French Royalists defeat French Republicans.
1793	War in the Vendée	Battle of Fougères	(France)	3 Nov	French Royalists defeat French Republicans.
1793	War in the Vendée	Battle of Granville	(France)	14 Nov	French Royalists defeat French Republicans.
1793	War of the First Coalition	Battle of Biesingen	(Germany)	17 Nov	Prussia defeats France.
1793	War in the Vendée	Battle of Pontorson	(France)	18 Nov	French Royalists defeat French Republicans.
1793	War of the First Coalition	Battle of Haguenau	(France)	18 Nov—22 Dec	French victory over Austria, French Royalists, Hesse-Kassel and Bavaria.
1793	War in the Vendée	Battle of Dol	(France)	20–22 Nov	French Royalist victory over French Republicans.
1793	War in the Vendée	Battle of Port-Saint-Père	(France)	21–26 Nov	French Republicans defeat French Royalists.
1793	French Revolution	First Battle of Kaiserslautern	(Germany)	28–30 Nov	Prussian army under Brunswick defeats French Army under Hoche.
1793	War of the First Coalition	Battle of Berstheim	(France)	2 Dec	French Republicans defeat French Royalists.
1793	War in the Vendée	Siege of Angers	(France)	3–4 Dec	French Republicans defeat French Royalists.
1793	War in the Vendée	Battle of La Flèche	(France)	8–11 Dec	French Republicans defeat French Royalists.
1793	War in the Vendée	Battle of Pontlieue	(France)	10 Dec	French Royalists defeat French Republicans.
1793	War in the Vendée	Battle of Le Mans	(France)	12–13 Dec	French Republican victory over French Royalists.
1793	War of the First Coalition	Battle of Froeschwiller	(France)	18–22 Dec	French victory over Austria.
1793	War of the Pyrenees	Battle of Collioure	(France)	20–23 Dec	Spanish push out French.
1793	French Revolutionary Wars	Battle of Wœrth	(France)	22 Dec	French army under Hoche defeats Austrians under Hotze.
1793	War in the Vendée	Battle of Savenay	(France)	23 Dec	French Republicans defeat French Royalists in the final battle of the War in the Vendée.
1793	French Revolutionary Wars	Battle of Geisberg	(France)	26 Dec	French army under Hoche, defeats Austrians under Wurmser and Prussians under Brunswick.
1793	French Revolutionary Wars	Second Battle of Wissembourg	(France)	26–29 Dec	French victory over Austria, Prussia, Bavaria and Hesse-Kassel.
1794	French Revolutionary Wars	Sunda Strait campaign of January 1794	(Indonesia)	2 Jan—9 Feb	Inconclusive naval actions between France and a coalition of Great Britain and the Netherlands.
1794	War in the Vendée	Battle of Noirmoutier	(France)	3 Jan	French Republicans defeat French Royalists.
1794	Haitian Revolution	Battle of Tiburon	(Haiti)	2–3 Feb	Great Britain defeats France.
1794	War of the Pyrenees	Battle of Sans Culottes Camp	(France)	5 Feb	French victory over Spain.
1794	War of the First Coalition	Battle of Martinique	(Martinique)	5 Feb—24 March	Great Britain defeats France. British hold Martinique until 1802.
1794	French Revolutionary Wars	Invasion of Corsica	(France)	7 Feb—10 Aug	Anglo-Corsican victory over France.
1794	French Revolutionary Wars	Siege of San Fiorenzo	(France)	7–20 Feb	Anglo-Corsican victory over France.
1794	Haitian Revolution and War of the First Coalition	Battle of the Acul	(Haiti)	19 Feb	Great Britain and French Royalists defeat France.
1794	Haitian Revolution and War of the First Coalition	Battle of Saint-Raphaël	(Haiti)	20–21 March	France defeats Spain.
1794	War of the First Coalition	Battle of La Cateau	(France)	29 March	Austria defeats France.
1794	Haitian Revolution and War of the First Coalition	Battle of La Bombarde	(Haiti)	March	German colonists in Saint-Domingue defeat Great Britain and French Royalists.
1794	Kościuszko Uprising	Battle of Racławice	(Poland)	4 April	Polish forces under Kościuszko defeat larger Russian force but are unable to give chase.
1794	French Revolutionary Wars	Siege of Bastia	(France)	4 April—22 May	Anglo-Corsican victory over France.
1794	War of the First Coalition	Invasion of Guadeloupe	(France)	11 April—10 Dec	Failed British attempt to capture Guadeloupe from France.
1794	Haitian Revolution and War of the First Coalition	Battle of Tiburon	(Haiti)	16 April	Great Britain and French Royalists defeat French Republicans.
1794	War of the First Coalition	Second Battle of Arlon	(Belgium)	17–18 April	French victory over Austria.
1794	Kościuszko Uprising	Warsaw Uprising of 1794	(Poland)	17–19 April	Polish drive Russians out of city.
1794	War of the First Coalition	Siege of Landrecies	(France)	17–30 April	Coalition victory. The Netherlands and Austria capture Landrecies from France.
1794	Kościuszko Uprising	Vilnius Uprising	(Lithuania)	22 April	Russians expelled from city by rebels.
1794	War of the First Coalition	Action of 23 April 1794	(United Kingdom)	23 April	British victory over France.
1794	War of the First Coalition	Battle of Villers-en-Cauchies	(France)	24 April	Austria and Great Britain defeat France.
1794	War of the First Coalition	Second Battle of Saorgio	(France)	24–28 April	French victory over Austria and Sardinia.
1794	War of the First Coalition	Battle of Beaumont	(France)	26 April	Austria and Great Britain defeat France.
1794	War of the First Coalition	Battle of Mouscron	(Belgium)	26–30 April	French army under Moreau and Souham defeats Austrians and Hanoverians under Saxe-Coburg.
1794	War of the Pyrenees	Second Battle of Boulou	(France)	29 April—1 May	French victory over Spain and Portugal.
1794	Haitian Revolution and War of the First Coalition	Battle of Gonaïves	(Haiti)	29 April—5 May	French victory over Spain.
1794	French Revolutionary Wars	Action of 5 May 1794	(Mauritius)	5 May	British victory over France.
1794	War of the Pyrenees	Siege of Collioure	(France)	6–29 May	French victory over Spain.
1794	French Revolutionary Wars	Action of 7 May 1794	At sea	7 May	British victory over France.
1794	War of the First Coalition	Battle of Willems	(Belgium)	10 May	French victory over Austria, Great Britain, Hanover and Hesse-Darmstadt.
1794	War of the First Coalition	Second Battle of Courtrai	(Belgium)	11 May	French victory over Austria, Great Britain, Hanover and Hesse-Darmstadt.
1794	War of the First Coalition	Battle of Grand-Reng	(Belgium)	13 May	Austro-Dutch victory over France.
1794	War of the First Coalition	Battle of Tourcoing	(France)	18 May	French army under Souham defeats Austrians, British and Hanoverians under Saxe-Coburg.
1794	War of the First Coalition	Second Battle of Tournay	(Belgium)	22 May	Coalition victory. Austria, Great Britain and Hanover defeat France.
1794	War of the First Coalition	Second Battle of Kaiserslautern	(Germany)	23 May	Prussian victory over France.
1794	War of the First Coalition	Battle of Erquelinnes	(Belgium)	24 May	Austro-Dutch victory over France.
1794	French Revolutionary Wars	Frigate action of 29 May 1794	(Spain)	29 May	British victory over France.
1794	Haitian Revolution and War of the First Coalition	Battle of Port-Républicain	(Haiti)	30 May—5 June	Great Britain and French Royalists defeat France.
1794	War of the First Coalition	Glorious First of June	At sea	1 June	Largest battle between France and Britain during the French Revolution.
1794	War of the First Coalition	Siege of Ypres	(Belgium)	1–18 June	French victory over Austria, Hesse-Kassel and Hanover.
1794	War of the Pyrenees	Battle of Aldudes	(France)	3 June	France defeats Spain.
1794	War of the First Coalition	Battle of Gosselies	(Belgium)	3 June	Austro-Dutch victory over France.
1794	War in the Vendée	Battle of Challans	(France)	6 June	French Republicans defeat French Royalists.
1794	Kościuszko Uprising	Battle of Szczekociny	(Poland)	6 June	Polish commander Kościuszko is defeated by Russo-Prussian army.
1794	Kościuszko Uprising	Battle of Chełm	(Poland)	8 June	Russian victory over Poland.
1794	War of the First Coalition	Battle of Lambusart	(Belgium)	16 June	Austro-Dutch victory over France.
1794	French Revolutionary Wars	Battle of Mykonos	(Greece)	17 June	British victory over France.
1794	French Revolutionary Wars	Siege of Calvi	(France)	17 June—10 Aug	Anglo-Corsican victory over France.
1794	War of the First Coalition	Battle of Fleurus	(Belgium)	26 June	French army under Jourdan defeats Austrian army under Saxe-Coburg.
1794	Haitian Revolution and War of the First Coalition	Battle of Dondon	(Haiti)	4 July	France defeats Spain and Haitians.
1794	Haitian Revolution and War of the First Coalition	Battle of La Tannerie	(Haiti)	8 July	Spanish and Haitians defeat France.
1794	Kościuszko Uprising	Battle of Rajgród	(Poland)	10 July	Polish rebel victory over Russia.
1794	Kościuszko Uprising	Battle of Błonie	(Poland)	10 July	Polish rebel victory over Russia.
1794	French Revolutionary Wars	Battle of Trippstadt	(Germany)	13–17 July	French victory over Prussia and Austria.
1794	Kościuszko Uprising	Siege of Warsaw	(Poland)	13 July—6 Sep	Polish victory over Russia and Prussia.
1794	War of the Pyrenees	Battle of the Baztan Valley	(Spain)	23 July—1 Aug	French victory over Spain and French Royalists.
1794	War of the Pyrenees	Battle of Sant Llorenç de la Muga	(Spain)	13 Aug	French victory over Spain and Portugal.
1794	Northwest Indian War	Battle of Fallen Timbers	(United States)	20 Aug	Americans under Wayne defeat Natives.
1794	Kościuszko Uprising	Greater Poland uprising	(Poland)	Aug—Dec	Prussians suppress rebellion.
1794	War of the First Coalition	Battle of Boxtel	(Netherlands)	14–15 Sep	French victory over Great Britain, Hesse-Kassel and Hesse-Darmstadt.
1794	War of the First Coalition	Battle of Sprimont	(Belgium)	18 Sep	French army under Jourdan defeats Austrians under Clairfayt. France fully annexes Austrian Netherlands.
1794	Kościuszko Uprising	Battle of Brest	(Belarus)	19 Sep	Russian victory over Poland.
1794	War of the First Coalition	Siege of Maastricht	(Netherlands)	19 Sep—4 Nov	France captures Maastricht from the Netherlands and the Prince-Bishopric of Liège. Austria helped defend the city.
1794	French Revolutionary War	First Battle of Dego	(Italy)	21 Sep	French victory over Austria and Sardinia.
1794		Nickajack Expedition	(United States)	Late summer—autumn	Chickamauga Cherokee forced to cede away territory to the Americans.
1794	War of the First Coalition	Second Battle of Aldenhoven	(Germany)	2 Oct	French army under Jourdan defeats Austrians under Clairfayt.
1794	Haitian Revolution and War of the First Coalition	Battle of Léogane	(Haiti)	6 Oct	French Republicans defeat Great Britain and French Royalists.
1794	Kościuszko Uprising	Battle of Maciejowice	(Poland)	10 Oct	Kościuszko is defeated, wounded and captured by two Russian forces.
1794	War of the Pyrenees	Battle of Orbaizeta	(Spain)	15–17 Oct	French victory over Spain.
1794	War of the First Coalition	Battle of Puiflijk	(Netherlands)	19 Oct	French victory over Great Britain and French Royalists.
1794	French Revolutionary Wars	Action of 21 October 1794	(France)	21 Oct	British victory over France.
1794	War of the First Coalition	Battle of Île Ronde	(Mauritius)	22 Oct	Inconclusive naval battle between France and Great Britain.
1794	War of the First Coalition	Siege of Nijmegen	(Netherlands)	27 Oct—8 Nov	French victory over the Netherlands, Great Britain, Hanover and Hesse-Kassel.
1794	Kościuszko Uprising	Battle of Praga	(Poland)	4 Nov	Russian forces retake Polish Warsaw, massacring civilians and devastating the city.
1794	French Revolutionary Wars	Action of 6 November 1794	At sea	6 Nov	French victory over Great Britain.
1794	War of the Pyrenees	Battle of the Black Mountain	(Spain)	17–20 Nov	French victory over Spain and Portugal.
1794	War of the Pyrenees	Battle of San Lorenzo de la Muga	(Spain)	20 Nov	French army under Pérignon defeats Spanish army.
1794	War of the First Coalition	Siege of Luxembourg	(Luxembourg)	22 Nov	French victory over Austria.
1794	War of the Pyrenees	Siege of Roses	(Spain)	28 Nov—4 Feb	French victory over Spain.
1794	Haitian Revolution and War of the First Coalition	Battle of Trutier	(Haiti)	5 Dec	Great Britain defeats France.
1794	French Revolutionary Wars	Battle of La Grève		13–14 Dec	French Republicans defeat French Royalists.
1794	War of the First Coalition	Croisière du Grand Hiver	At sea	24 Dec	Failed French attempt to fight British.
1794	Haitian Revolution and War of the First Coalition	Battle of Tiburon	(Haiti)	24–29 Dec	French Republicans defeat Great Britain and French Royalists.
1795	War of the First Coalition	Capture of the Dutch fleet at Den Helder	(Netherlands)	23 Jan	French victory over the Netherlands.
1795	War of the Pyrenees	Battle of the Gulf of Roses	(Spain)	14 Feb	Spanish victory over France.
1795		Fédon's rebellion	(Grenada)	2 March	Failed rebellion against Great Britain in Grenada.
1795	French Revolutionary Wars	Action of 8 March 1795	(France)	8 March	French victory over Great Britain.
1795	Maratha-Nizam War	Battle of Kharda	(India)	11 March	Major defeat for Nizam of Hyderabad against the Maratha Empire.
1795	War of the First Coalition	Battle of Genoa	(Italy)	13–14 March	Anglo-Neapolitan victory over France.
1795	French Revolutionary Wars	Action of 10 April 1795	At sea	10 April	British victory over France.
1795	Chouannerie	Battle of Liffré	(France)	7 May	French Republicans defeat French Royalists and Federalists.
1795	Unification of the Hawaiian Islands	Battle of Nuʻuanu	(United States)	May	The Oʻahuan army jumps off cliff to escape Kamehameha I.
1795	Haitian Revolution and War of the First Coalition	Battle of Mirebalais	(Haiti)	1 June	French Royalists and Great Britain defeat French Republicans.
1795	Hawkesbury and Nepean Wars	Battle of Richmond Hill	(Australia)	7 June	Great Britain defeats the Dharug.
1795	French Revolutionary Wars	Battle of Muizenberg	(South Africa)	10 June—15 Sep	British gain control of Cape Colony over the Dutch.
1795	War of the Pyrenees	Battle of Pontós	(Spain)	11 June	Spain defeats France.
1795	War of the Pyrenees	Battle of Bascara	(Spain)	14 June	Spanish-Portuguese victory over France.
1795	War of the First Coalition	Cornwallis's Retreat	(France)	16–17 June	Outnumbered British defeat French.
1795	War of the First Coalition	Battle of Groix	(France)	23 June	British victory over France.
1795	War of the First Coalition	Battle of Quiberon	(France)	23 June—21 July	British attempt to invade France.
1795	French Revolutionary Wars	Action of 24 June 1795	(France)	24 June	British victory over France.
1795	War of the First Coalition	Battle of the Hyères Islands	(France)	13 July	Anglo-Neapolitan victory over France.
1795	French Revolutionary Wars	Battle of Plouharnel	(France)	16 July	French Republicans defeat French Royalists and Great Britain.
1795	War of the First Coalition	Capture of Trincomalee	(Sri Lanka)	21 July	Great Britain defeats the Batavian Republic and takes the port of Trincomalee on Ceylon by force.
1795	Haitian Revolution and War of the First Coalition	Battle of Las Cahobas	(Haiti)	Early Aug	France defeats Spain.
1795	War of the Pyrenees	Battle of Saint-Jean-de-Monts	(France)	9–12 Aug	French Royalists defeat French Republicans.
1795	Slave revolts in North America	Curaçao Slave Revolt of 1795	(Netherlands)	17 Aug—19 Sep	Failed slave rebellion against the Netherlands, defining Curaçaoan history.
1795	French Revolutionary Wars	Action of 22 August 1795	(Norway)	22 Aug	British victory over the Batavian Republic.
1795	Haitian Revolution and War of the First Coalition	Battle of Verrettes	(Haiti)	Late Aug	French Republicans defeat French Royalists and Great Britain.
1795	Haitian Revolution and War of the First Coalition	Battle of Petite-Rivière	(Haiti)	Aug	French Republicans defeat French Royalists and Great Britain.
1795		Battle of Krtsanisi	(Georgia (country))	8–11 Sep	Persians annihilate the Georgian army of the Kingdom of Kartli-Kakheti and the Kingdom of Imereti and proceed to massacre Tbilisi.
1795	Armagh disturbances	Battle of the Diamond	(Northern Ireland)	21 Sep	Confrontation between Irish Catholics and Protestants.
1795	War of the First Coalition	Battle of Handschuhsheim	(Germany)	24 Sep	Austrian victory over France.
1795	War in the Vendée	Battle of Saint-Cyr-en-Talmondais	(France)	25 Sep	French Republicans defeat French Royalists.
1795	French Revolution and War of the First Coalition	13 Vendémiaire	(France)	5 Oct	
1795	War of the First Coalition	Battle of the Levant Convoy	(Portugal)	7 Oct	French victory over Great Britain.
1795	War of the First Coalition	Battle of Höchst	(Germany)	11–12 Oct	Austrian victory over France.
1795	Haitian Revolution and War of the First Coalition	Battle of Dondon	(Haiti)	14 Oct	French Republicans defeat French Royalists.
1795	War of the First Coalition	Action at Mannheim	(Germany)	18 Oct	Austrians defeat French after a truce.
1795	War of the First Coalition	Battle of Mainz	(Germany)	29 October	Second time balloons were used in battle. Austria defeats France.
1795	War of the First Coalition	Battle of Pfeddersheim	(Germany)	10 Nov	Habsburg Austrian victory over the French.
1795	War of the First Coalition	Battle of Loano	(Italy)	23 Nov	French army under Masséna defeats Austrians, Piedmontese and Sardinian army.
1796	War in the Vendée	Battle of La Bruffière	(France)	3–4 Jan	French Republicans defeat French Royalists.
1796	War in the Vendée	Battle of Locminé	(France)	7 April	French Royalists defeat French Republicans.
1796	War of the First Coalition	Battle of Voltri	(Italy)	10 April	Austria defeats France.
1796	War of the First Coalition	Battle of Montenotte	(Italy)	11–12 April	In Napoleon's first victory in the First Italian Campaign, French army defeat Austrians.
1796	War of the First Coalition	Battle of Millesimo	(Italy)	13–14 April	French army under Napoleon defeats Austrians and Piedmontese.
1796	War of the First Coalition	Battle of Dego	(Italy)	14–15 April	French army under Napoleon defeats Austrians under Beaulieu.
1796	War of the First Coalition	Battle of Ceva	(Italy)	16 April	France defeats Sardinia.
1796	War of the First Coalition	Battle of Mondovì	(Italy)	20–22 April	French army defeats Austrians and Piedmontese.
1796	Russo-Persian Wars	Persian expedition of 1796	(Iran) / (Russia) / (Azerbaijan) / (Armenia) / (Georgia (country))	April—Nov	Status quo ante bellum. Russian invasion of Persia.
1796	War of the First Coalition	Battle of Fombio	(Italy)	7–9 May	French victory over Austria.
1796	War of the First Coalition	Battle of Lodi	(Italy)	10 May	French army under Napoleon defeats Austrians under Beaulieu.
1796	War of the First Coalition	Action of 12 May 1796	(Netherlands)	12 May	British victory over the Batavian Republic.
1796	Russo-Persian Wars	Siege of Derbent	(Russia)	21 May	Russians storm the Persian citadel of Derbent and capture the city.
1796	War of the First Coalition	Battle of Borghetto	(Italy)	30 May	French victory over Austria.
1796	French Revolutionary Wars	Action of 31 May 1796	(Italy)	31 May	British victory over France.
1796	War of the First Coalition	Battle of Siegburg	(Germany)	1 June	French victory over Austria.
1796	War of the First Coalition	Battle of Altenkirchen	(Germany)	4 June	French victory over Austria.
1796	French Revolutionary Wars	Atlantic raid of June 1796	At sea	4–22 June	British victory over France.
1796	War of the First Coalition	Early clashes in the Rhine campaign of 1796	(Austria) / (Germany)	June 1796 – Feb 1797	
1796	War of the First Coalition	Battle of Wetzlar	(Germany)	15 June	Austria defeats France.
1796	War of the First Coalition	Battle of Maudach	(Germany)	15 June	French victory over Austria.
1796	War of the First Coalition	Battle of Kircheib	(Germany)	19 June	Austrian victory over France.
1796	War of the First Coalition	First Battle of Kehl	(Germany)	23–24 June	French victory over Austria and the Swabian Circle.
1796	Montenegrin–Ottoman wars	Battle of Martinići	(Montenegro)	2–11 July	Convincing Montenegrin victory against much larger Turkish Army of Kara Mahmud Pasha.
1796	French Revolutionary Wars	Battle of Rastatt	(Germany)	5 July	France defeats Austria.
1796	French Revolutionary Wars	Battle of Ettlingen	(Germany)	9 July	French victory over Austria and Saxony.
1796	War of the First Coalition	Battle of Lonato	(Italy)	3–4 Aug	French victory over Austria.
1796	War of the First Coalition	Battle of Castiglione	(Italy)	5 Aug	French victory over Austria.
1796	War of the First Coalition	Battle of Peschiera	(Italy)	6 Aug	French victory over Austria.
1796	Haitian Revolution and War of the First Coalition	Battle of Les Irois	(Haiti)	7 Aug	Great Britain defeats France.
1796	War of the First Coalition	Battle of Altendorf	(Germany)	9 Aug	France defeats Austria.
1796	French Revolutionary War	Battle of Neresheim	(Germany)	11 Aug	Either French victory or inconclusive battle between France and Austria.
1796	War of the First Coalition	Capitulation of Saldanha Bay	(South Africa)	17 Aug	British victory over the Batavian Republic. The Dutch fail to recapture the Dutch Cape Colony.
1796	War of the First Coalition	Battle of Sulzbach	(Germany)	19 Aug	France defeats Austria.
1796	War of the First Coalition	Battle of Theiningen	(Germany)	21–22 Aug	Austrians fail to push back French, but French don't make any gains either.
1796	War of the First Coalition	Battle of Amberg	(Germany)	24 Aug	Austria defeats France.
1796	French Revolutionary Wars	Battle of Friedberg	(Germany)	24 Aug	French victory over Austria.
1796	War of the First Coalition	Newfoundland expedition	(Canada) / (France)	28 Aug—5 Sep	France and Spain attack Great Britain. French hold onto Newfoundland.
1796	War of the First Coalition	Battle of Würzburg	(Germany)	3 Sep	Archduke Charles defeats French under Jourdan.
1796	War of the First Coalition	Battle of Rovereto	(Italy)	4 Sep	French victory over Austria.
1796	War of the First Coalition	First Battle of Bassano	(Italy)	8 Sep	French victory over Austria.
1796	French Revolutionary Wars	Action of 9 September 1796	(Indonesia)	9 Sep	Inconclusive naval battle between France and Great Britain.
1796	War of the First Coalition	Battle of Limburg	(Germany)	16–19 Sep	Austrian victory over France.
1796	War of the First Coalition	Second Battle of Kehl	(Germany)	18 Sep	Stalemate between France and Austria.
1796	Unification of the Hawaiian Islands	Battle of Kaipalaoa	(United States)	September	Only major battle of Nāmākēhā's rebellion and a decisive victory for Kamehameha I's forces, who would continue to pursue Nāmākēhā into January 1797 and eventually capture and sacrifice him
1796	War of the First Coalition	Battle of Biberach	(Germany)	2 Oct	France defeats Austria.
1796	Montenegrin–Ottoman wars	Battle of Krusi	(Montenegro)	3 Oct	Montenegrins defeated much larger Turkish Army of Kara Mahmud Pasha who was killed in the battle.
1796	French Revolutionary Wars	Action of 13 October 1796	(Spain)	13 Oct	British victory over Spain.
1796	War of the First Coalition	Battle of Emmendingen	(Germany)	19 Oct	Austrian victory over France.
1796	War of the First Coalition	Battle of Schliengen	(Germany)	24 Oct	Austrian victory over France.
1796	War of the First Coalition	Siege of Kehl	(Germany)	26 Oct 1796 – 9 Jan 1797	Austria captures French fortifications near Kehl, defending the Rhine crossings of the French army.
1796	Montenegrin–Ottoman wars	Battle of Lopate	(Montenegro)	Oct	Draw between Montenegro and the Ottoman Empire.
1796	War of the First Coalition	Second Battle of Bassano	(Italy)	6 Nov	Austrian victory over France.
1796	War of the First Coalition	Battle of Calliano	(Italy)	6–7 Nov	Austrian victory over France.
1796	War of the First Coalition	First Battle of Caldiero	(Italy)	12 Nov	Austrian victory over France.
1796	War of the First Coalition	Battle of the Bridge of Arcole	(Italy)	15–17 Nov	French army under Napoleon defeats Austrian army.
1796	French Revolutionary Wars	Action of 19 December 1796	(Spain)	19 Dec	Inconclusive naval battle between Great Britain and Spain.
1796	French Revolutionary Wars	Siege of Hüningen	(France)	27 Nov 1796 – 1 Feb 1797	Austria captures Huningue from France.
1796	War of the First Coalition	French expedition to Ireland	(Republic of Ireland)	Dec	French fleet partially destroyed by a storm, leading the expedition to fail.
1797	French Revolutionary Wars	Action of 13 January 1797	(France)	13 Jan	British victory over France.
1797	War of the First Coalition	Battle of Rivoli	(Italy)	14 Jan	Napoleon's first decisive victory. French army wins against Austrians under Alvinczi.
1797	War of the First Coalition	Battle of La Favorita	(Italy)	16 Jan	France defeats Austria.
1797	War of the First Coalition	Action of 25 January 1797	(Spain)	25 Jan	Spanish victory over Great Britain.
1797	French Revolutionary Wars	Bali Strait Incident	(Indonesia)	28 Jan	Confrontation between French and British forces. British victory.
1797	War of the First Coalition	Battle of Faenza	(Italy)	3 Feb	French victory over the Papal States.
1797	Anglo-Spanish War and War of the First Coalition	Battle of Cape St Vincent	(Portugal)	14 Feb	British admiral Jervis defeats Spanish fleet.
1797	Anglo-Spanish War and War of the First Coalition	Invasion of Trinidad	(Trinidad and Tobago)	21 Feb	British capture and hold Trinidad from Spain.
1797	War of the First Coalition	Battle of Fishguard	(Wales)	22–24 Feb	Great Britain defeats France.
1797	War of the First Coalition	Battle of Tagliamento	(Italy)	16 March	French victory over Austria. Also known as the Battle of Valvasone.
1797	Hawkesbury and Nepean Wars	Battle of Parramatta	(Australia)	21–22 March	British capture Bidjigal leader Pemulwuy.
1797	War of the First Coalition	Battle of Tarvis	(Italy)	21–23 March	France defeats Austria.
1797	Haitian Revolution and War of the First Coalition	Battle of Jean-Rabel	(Haiti)	15–21 April	Great Britain defeats France.
1797	Anglo-Spanish War and War of the First Coalition	Battle of San Juan	(Puerto Rico)	17 April—2 May	Spanish hold onto San Juan, Puerto Rico against Great Britain.
1797	French Revolutionary Wars	Battle of Neuwied	(Germany)	18 April	French army under Hoche defeats Austrians under Werneck.
1797	War of the First Coalition	Battle of Diersheim	(Germany)	20 April	French army under Moreau defeats Austrians under Kray.
1797	Haitian Revolution and War of the First Coalition	Battle of Les Irois	(Haiti)	20–24 April	Great Britain defeats France.
1797	French Revolutionary Wars	Action of 26 April 1797	(Spain)	26 April	British victory over Spain.
1797		Action of 16 May 1797	(Libya)	16 May	Danish forces attack Tripoli after Tripolitanian leaders demand more bribes to stop piracy.
1797	French Revolutionary Wars	Assault on Cádiz (1797)	(Spain)	June—July	British fail to capture Cádiz, but both Spain and UK suffer economically.
1797	War of the First Coalition	Battle of Santa Cruz de Tenerife	(Spain)	22–25 July	Spanish hold onto Santa Cruz de Tenerife against Great Britain.
1797	War of the First Coalition	Capture of the HMS Hermione	At sea	21–22 Sep	Spain captures the boat from British mutineers.
1797	War of the First Coalition	Battle of Camperdown	(Netherlands)	11 Oct	British fleet under Duncan defeats a Dutch fleet.
1798	French Revolutionary Wars	Raid on Manila	(Philippines)	13 Jan	British hit-and-run Spanish Manila.
1798	French Revolutionary Wars	Raid on Zamboanga	(Philippines)	22 Jan	British lose ships at Spanish Zamboanga.
1798	French Revolutionary Wars	French invasion of Switzerland	(Switzerland)	28 Jan—17 May	Switzerland becomes a French puppet state.
1798	French Revolutionary Wars	Battle of Grauholz	(Switzerland)	5 March	France defeats Switzerland.
1798	French Revolutionary Wars	Battle of the Raz de Sein	(France)	21 April	British victory over France.
1798	French Revolutionary Wars	Battle of the Îles Saint-Marcouf	(France)	7 May	British victory over France.
1798	French Revolutionary Wars	Expedition to Ostend	(Belgium)	18 May	British launches recon effort against France to destroy a fleet set to invade them.
1798	Irish Rebellion of 1798	Battle of Prosperous	(Republic of Ireland)	23 May—19 June	Settlement changes hands twice, ultimately controlled by Government forces in an Irish rebellion against Great Britain.
1798	Irish Rebellion of 1798	Battle of Ballymore-Eustace	(Republic of Ireland)	24 May	Rebels unable to take stronghold from British government forces.
1798	Irish Rebellion of 1798	Battle of Naas	(Republic of Ireland)	24 May	Rebel attack against Great Britain barely thwarted.
1798	Irish Rebellion of 1798	Battle of Kilcullen	(Republic of Ireland)	24 May	British Government cavalry charge defeats rebels.
1798	Irish Rebellion of 1798	Battle of Carlow	(Republic of Ireland)	25 May	Rebels defeated by the British government forces by two ambushes after believing they had won.
1798	Irish Rebellion of 1798	Battle of Tara Hill	(Republic of Ireland)	26 May	British victory halts spread of the rebellion.
1798	Irish Rebellion of 1798	Battle of Oulart Hill	(Republic of Ireland)	27 May	British Wexford militia annihilated by rebels.
1798	Irish Rebellion of 1798	Battle of Enniscorthy	(Republic of Ireland)	28 May	Irish rebels defeat British government forces.
1798	Irish Rebellion of 1798	Gibbet Rath massacre	(Republic of Ireland)	29 May	Unprovoked British attack against Irish rebels.
1798	Irish Rebellion of 1798	Battle of Three Rocks	(Republic of Ireland)	30 May	Rebel victory against Great Britain.
1798	French Revolutionary Wars	Action of 30 May 1798	(France)	30 May	British victory over France.
1798	Irish Rebellion of 1798	Battle of Bunclody	(Republic of Ireland)	1 June	British surprise counterattack after apparent Irish victory routs rebels.
1798	Irish Rebellion of 1798	Battle of Tuberneering	(Republic of Ireland)	4 June	Rebel victory in Ireland against British government forces.
1798	Irish Rebellion of 1798	Battle of New Ross	(Republic of Ireland)	5 June	British victory halts spread of rebellion into two counties.
1798	Irish Rebellion of 1798	Battle of Antrim	(Northern Ireland)	7 June	British victory against Irish rebels. Lord O'Neill mortally wounded.
1798	Irish Rebellion of 1798	Battle of Arklow	(Republic of Ireland)	9 June	British victory forces Wexford rebels onto the defensive.
1798	War of the Second Coalition	French invasion of Malta	(Malta)	10–12 June	French occupy Malta.
1798	Irish Rebellion of 1798	Battle of Foulksmills	(Republic of Ireland)	20 June	British victory over rebels.
1798	Irish Rebellion of 1798	Battle of Vinegar Hill	(Republic of Ireland)	21 June	British retake Wexford from Irish rebels.
1798	French Revolutionary Wars	Action of 27 June 1798	At sea	27 June	British victory over France.
1798	French Revolutionary Wars	Action of 30 June 1798	(France)	30 June	British victory over France.
1798	Irish Rebellion of 1798	Battle of Ballyellis	(Republic of Ireland)	30 June	British charge into a disaster, thinking they are attacking the rearguard of fleeing Irish forces.
1798	Quasi-War	Capture of La Croyable	(United States)	7 July	First ship captured by the United States Navy from France.
1798	French Revolutionary Wars	Battle of Shubra Khit	(Egypt)	13 July	French defeat Mamluks.
1798	War of the Second Coalition	Action of 15 July 1798	(Spain)	15 July	British victory over Spain.
1798	War of the Second Coalition	Battle of the Pyramids	(Egypt)	21 July	Napoleon defeats Mameluks in Egypt.
1798	War of the Second Coalition	Battle of the Nile	(Egypt)	1–3 Aug	French fleet in Abukir Bay destroyed by Nelson. Major precursor to War of the Second Coalition and Napoleon abandoning Egypt.
1798	War of the Second Coalition	Action of 18 August 1798	(Greece)	18 Aug	French victory over Great Britain.
1798	Irish Rebellion of 1798	Battle of Castlebar	(Republic of Ireland)	27 Aug	Franco-Irish army defeats British forces.
1798	War of the Second Coalition	Siege of Malta	(Malta)	2 Sep 1798 – 4 Sep 1800	Two-year siege of a French garrison by Maltese rebels, the British, Neapolitans and Portuguese.
1798	French Revolutionary Wars	Battle of St. George's Caye	(Belize)	3–10 Sep	Attempted Spanish invasion of British Belize.
1798	Irish Rebellion of 1798	Battle of Ballinamuck	(Republic of Ireland)	8 Sep	British defeat Irish rebels helped by France.
1798	Irish Rebellion of 1798	Battle of Killala	(Republic of Ireland)	23 Sep	British defeat Irish rebels helped by France.
1798	War of the Second Coalition	Battle of Sedment	(Egypt)	7 Oct	France defeats the Ottoman Mamluks.
1798	War of the First Coalition and Irish Rebellion of 1798	Battle of Tory Island	(Republic of Ireland)	12 Oct	British defeat France.
1798	French Revolutionary Wars	Peasants' War	(Netherlands)	12 Oct—5 Dec	Uprising in Southern Netherlands against French rule.
1798	War of the Second Coalition	Revolt of Cairo	(Egypt)	21–22 Oct	Failed protest against French rule in Egypt.
1798	French Revolutionary Wars	Battle of Nicopolis	(Greece)	23 Oct	Ali Pasha of Janina captures Preveza from the French.
1798	French Revolutionary Wars	Action of 24 October 1798	(Netherlands)	24 Oct	British victory over the Batavian Republic.
1798	Peasants' War	Battle of Herentals	(Belgium)	29 Oct	France defeats Dutch peasants.
1798	Peasants' War	Battle of Pollare	(Belgium)	2 Nov	France defeats Dutch peasants.
1798	War of the Second Coalition	Siege of Corfu	(Greece)	4 Nov	Russo-Ottoman victory over France.
1798	Peasants' War	Battle of Bornem	(Netherlands)	4–5 Nov	France defeats Dutch peasants.
1798	War of the Second Coalition	Capture of Minorca	(Spain)	7–15 Nov	Spanish Menorca occupied by British until 1802.
1798	Peasants' War	Battle of Meerhout	(Netherlands)	12 Nov	Dutch peasants defeat France.
1798	Quasi War	Capture of USS Retaliation	At sea	20 Nov	French victory over Americans.
1798	Peasants' War	Battle of Mol	(Belgium)	22–23 Nov	France defeats Dutch peasants.
1798	Afghan–Sikh Wars	Battle of Amritsar	(India)	24 Nov	Sikhs defeat Durrani.
1798	War of the Second Coalition	Battle of Civita Castelana	(Italy)	4 Dec	French and Polish defeat Neapolitans.
1798	Peasants' War	Battle of Hasselt	(Belgium)	5 Dec	France defeats Dutch peasants.
1798	War of the Second Coalition	Action of 14 December 1798	(France)	14 Dec	French victory over Great Britain.
1799	French Revolutionary Wars	Battle of Tahta	(Egypt)	8 Jan	French victory over local Egyptian forces at Tahta.
1799	French Revolutionary Wars	Action of 19 January 1799	(United Kingdom)	19 Jan	Spanish victory over Great Britain.
1799	French Revolutionary Wars	Battle of Samhud	(Egypt)	22 Jan	France defeats the Ottoman Mamluks.
1799	French Revolutionary Wars	Macau Incident	(China)	27 Jan	Inconclusive encounter between British, French, and Spanish warships.
1799	War of the Second Coalition	Action of 6 February 1799	(Spain)	6 Feb	British victory over Spain.
1799	Quasi-War	USS Constellation vs L'Insurgente	(Saint Kitts and Nevis)	9 Feb	American morale boost from naval victory over French.
1799	French Revolutionary Wars	South African Action of 9 February 1799	(South Africa)	9 Feb	British defeat French.
1799	French Revolutionary Wars	Siege of El Arish	(Egypt)	8–20 Feb	French victory over Ottomans.
1799	French Revolutionary Wars	Battle of Aswan	(Egypt)	9 Feb	French victory over the Mamluks near Aswan.
1799	French Revolutionary Wars	Action of 28 February 1799	(India)	28 Feb	British victory over France.
1799	French Revolutionary Wars	Battle of Qena	(Egypt)	3 March	Ottoman victory over the French, "L' Italie" flotilla sunk
1799	Fourth Anglo-Mysore War	Battle of Seedaseer	(India)	6 March	Original Mysorean victory, later British victory.
1799	War of the Second Coalition	Siege of Jaffa	(Israel)	7 March	Napoleon captures city from the Ottoman Empire.
1799	War of the Second Coalition	Battle of Abnud	(Egypt)	8 March	French victory over Ottoman-Meccan forces
1799	War of the Second Coalition	Battle of Ostrach	(Germany)	20–21 March	Austrian victory over France.
1799	War of the Second Coalition	Siege of Acre	(Israel)	20 March—21 May	Unsuccessful attempt by Napoleon to capture city from the Ottoman Empire.
1799	War of the Second Coalition	Battle of Feldkirch	(Austria)	23 March	Outnumbered Austrians defeat French.
1799	War of the Second Coalition	First Battle of Stockach	(Germany)	25 March	Austrian victory over France.
1799	French Revolutionary War	Battle of Verona	(Italy)	26 March	Draw between France and Austria.
1799	Fourth Anglo-Mysore War	Battle of Mallavelly	(India)	27 March	Great Britain defeats the Kingdom of Mysore.
1799	War of the Second Coalition	Italian and Swiss expedition	(Italy) / (Switzerland) / (Germany) / (Austria)	March—Dec	Austria and Russia against France. Russia pulls out of the war.
1799	French Revolutionary War	Battle of Magnano	(Italy)	5 April	Austria defeats France.
1799	Fourth Anglo-Mysore War	Battle of Sultanpet Tope	(India)	5–6 April	Great Britain defeats the Kingdom of Mysore.
1799	War of the Second Coalition	Battle of Mount Tabor	(Israel)	16 April	French victory over the Ottoman Empire.
1799	War of the Second Coalition	Battle of Cassano	(Italy)	27–28 April	Austro-Russian victory over France.
1799	War of the Second Coalition	Siege of Mantua	(Italy)	April—30 July	Austria captures Mantua from the French-controlled Cisalpine Republic.
1799	War of the Second Coalition	Battle of Bassignana	(Italy)	12 May	France defeats Russia.
1799	War of the Second Coalition	First Battle of Marengo	(Italy)	16 May	Austro-Russian victory over France.
1799	War of the Second Coalition	Battle of Frauenfeld	(Switzerland)	25 May	Stalemate between France and Austria.
1799	War of the Second Coalition	Battle of Winterthur	(Switzerland)	27 May	Austria defeats France.
1799	War of the Second Coalition	Capture of Kosseir	(Egypt)	29 May	French forces capture "El Qoseir" a port city on the Red Sea to halt further incoming of Meccan troops.
1799	War of the Second Coalition	First Battle of Zürich	(Switzerland)	4–7 June	Austria defeats France.
1799	War of the Second Coalition	Battle of Modena	(Italy)	12 June	France defeats Austria.
1799	War of the Second Coalition	Battle of the Trebbia	(Italy)	17–20 June	Russians and Austrians defeat French.
1799	War of the Second Coalition	Action of 18 June 1799	(France)	18 June	British victory over France.
1799	War of the Second Coalition	Second Battle of Marengo	(Italy)	20 June	French victory over Austria.
1799	Napoleonic Wars	Action of 7 July 1799	(United Kingdom)	7 July	Spanish victory over Great Britain.
1799	War of the Second Coalition	Battle of Abukir	(Egypt)	25 July	Napoleon and Murat defeat Turks.
1799	War of the Second Coalition	Battle of Oberwald	(Switzerland)	13–14 Aug	France defeats Austria.
1799	War of the Second Coalition	Battle of Schwyz	(Switzerland)	14–15 Aug	France defeats Austria.
1799	War of the Second Coalition	Battle of Amsteg	(Switzerland)	14–16 Aug	France defeats Austria.
1799	War of the Second Coalition	Battle of Novi	(Italy)	15 Aug	Austrians and Russians beat the French. Joubert is defeated and killed.
1799	French Revolutionary Wars	Action of 16 October 1799	(Spain)	16 Oct	British victory over Spain.
1799	War of the Second Coalition	Battle of Callantsoog	(Netherlands)	27 Aug	Amphibious landing by British invaders forces Dutch to retreat.
1799	War of the Second Coalition	Vlieter incident	(Netherlands)	30 Aug	Dutch surrender a ship to British.
1799	War of the Second Coalition	Battle of Krabbendam	(Netherlands)	10 Sep	Great Britain defeats France. British division establishes a bridgehead in the extreme north of Holland.
1799	War of the Second Coalition	Battle of Mannheim	(Germany)	18 Sep	Austria defeats France.
1799	War of the Second Coalition	Battle of Bergen	(Netherlands)	19 Sep	French defeat English and Russians.
1799	War of the Second Coalition	Battle of the St. Gotthard	(Switzerland)	24 Sep	Austro-Russian victory over France.
1799	War of the Second Coalition	Battle of the Devil's Bridge	(Switzerland)	25 Sep	Russian victory over France.
1799	War of the Second Coalition	Battle of Linth	(Switzerland)	25 Sep	French army under Soult defeats Austrians under Hotze.
1799	War of the Second Coalition	Second Battle of Zurich	(Switzerland)	25 Sep	French under Masséna defeat Russians under Korsakov.
1799	War of the Second Coalition	Battle in the Muota Valley	(Switzerland)	30 Sep—1 Oct	Russia defeats France.
1799	War of the Second Coalition	Battle of Alkmaar	(Netherlands)	2 Oct	Dutch-French coalition prevents a Russian-English invasion in Holland.
1799	War of the Second Coalition	Battle of Castricum	(Netherlands)	6 Oct	Franco-Dutch force defeats an Anglo-Russian force.
1799	Chouannerie	Battle of Nantes	(France)	20 Oct	French Royalists defeat French Republicans.
1799	War of the Second Coalition	Second Battle of Novi	(Italy)	24 Oct	French victory over Austria.
1799	War of the Second Coalition	Battle of Damietta	(Egypt)	1 Nov	France defeats the Ottoman Empire.
1799	War in the Vendée	Battle of Les Aubiers	(France)	2–4 Nov	French Republicans defeat French Royalists.
1799	War of the Second Coalition	Battle of Genola	(Italy)	4 Nov	Austria defeats France.
1799	War of the Second Coalition	Battle of Wiesloch	(Germany)	3 Dec	Austria defeats France.
1799	French Revolutionary Wars	Battle of Port Louis	(Mauritius)	11 Dec	British victory over France.
1800	Quasi-War and War of Knives	Action of 1 January 1800	(Haiti)	1 Jan	Indecisive naval battle between United States and France.
1800	Chouannerie	Battle of the Tombettes	(France)	25 Jan	French Republicans defeat French Royalists.
1800	Quasi-War	USS Constellation vs La Vengeance	(Saint Kitts and Nevis)	1–2 Feb	Inconclusive battle ends in French withdrawing from the United States.
1800	War of the Second Coalition	Battle of the Malta Convoy	(Malta)	18 Feb	British-Maltese fleet defeats French.
1800	War of the Second Coalition	Battle of Heliopolis	(Egypt)	20 March	France defeats Great Britain and the Ottoman Empire.
1800	War of the Second Coalition	Action of 31 March 1800	(Malta)	31 March	British victory over France.
1800		Battle of Malpura	(India)	March	Jaipur State and British-backed Gwalior State fight over a government crisis. Victory for Gwalior.
1800	War of the Second Coalition	Siege of Genoa	(Italy)	6 April—4 June	Austria captures Genoa from the French controlled Ligurian Republic.
1800	French Revolutionary Wars	Action of 7 April 1800	(Spain)	7 April	British victory over Spain.
1800	War of the Second Coalition	Battle of Sassello	(Italy)	10 April	Austrian victory over France.
1800	War of the Second Coalition	Battle of Engen	(Germany)	3 May	French army under Moreau defeats Austrians under Kray.
1800	War of the Second Coalition	Battle of Stockach	(Germany)	3 May	French army under Lecourbe defeats Austrians.
1800	French Revolutionary Wars	Battle of Biberach	(Germany)	9 May	French recapture city from Austrians.
1800	Quasi-War	Battle of Puerto Plata Harbor	(Dominican Republic)	11 May	American victory in Santo Domingo against France and Spain.
1800	War of the Second Coalition	Battle of Messkirch	(Germany)	15 May	French army under Moreau defeats Austrians under Kray.
1800	War of the Second Coalition	Battle of Erbach	(Germany)	15 May	French victory over Austria, although heavy casualties on both sides.
1800	War of the Second Coalition	Combat of Turbigo	(Italy)	31 May	French victory over Austria.
1800	War of the Second Coalition	Battle of Montebello	(Italy)	9 June	French army under Lannes defeats Austrians under Ott.
1800	War of the Second Coalition	Battle of Marengo	(Italy)	14 June	French army under Napoleon defeats Austrians under von Melas.
1800	War of the Second Coalition	Battle of Höchstädt	(Germany)	19 June	French army under Moreau defeats Austrians under Kray.
1800	War of the Second Coalition	Battle of Neuburg	(Germany)	27 June	France defeats Austria.
1800	War of the Second Coalition	Raid on Dunkirk	(France)	7 July	British victory over France.
1800	War of the Second Coalition and Quasi-War	Invasion of Curaçao	(Netherlands)	22 July—25 Sep	French invasion of Dutch Curaçao is followed by a British invasion and occupation of Curaçao.
1800	French Revolutionary Wars	Action of 4 August 1800	(Brazil)	4 Aug	British victory over France.
1800	War of the Second Coalition	Ferrol Expedition	(Spain)	25–26 Aug	British fail to capture Ferrol from Spain.
1800	Quasi-War	USS Boston vs Berceau	(France)	12 Oct	American victory over France.
1800	Quasi-War	USS Enterprise vs Flambeau	(Dominica)	25 Oct	American victory over France.
1800	French Revolutionary War	Battle of Ampfing	(Germany)	1 Dec	Austria defeats France.
1800	War of the Second Coalition	Battle of Hohenlinden	(Germany)	3 Dec	French army under Moreau defeats Austrians and Bavarians under Archduke John.
1800	Napoleonic Wars	Action of 10 December 1800	(United Kingdom)	10 Dec	Spanish victory over Great Britain.
1800	War of the Second Coalition	Battle of Pozzolo	(Italy)	25 Dec	French army under Brune defeats Austrians under Bellegarde.
