= Siege of Koppal =

Battle of the Third Anglo-Mysore War

- Part of the Third Anglo-Mysore War
Date	28 October 1790 – 7 April 1791 (23 weeks)
Location	Koppal, Mysore, India 15.35°N 76.15°E
Result	Anglo-Hyderabadi victory

Belligerents
Kingdom of Mysore	Hyderabad; British East India Company

Commanders and leaders
Tipu Sultan	Mahabat Jung; Hugh Montgomery

The Siege of Koppal (28 October 1790 – 7 April 1791) was conducted during the Third Anglo-Mysore War by forces of the Nizam of Hyderabad under the command of Mahabat Jung, assisted by a contingent of British East India Company forces. The siege was poorly conducted, and the garrison surrendered principally because Bangalore had fallen in February 1791. The Siege of Koppal (28 October 1790 – 7 April 1791) was conducted during the Third Anglo-Mysore War by forces of the Nizam of Hyderabad under the command of Mahabat Jung, assisted by a contingent of British East India Company forces. The siege was poorly conducted, and the garrison surrendered principally because Bangalore had fallen in February 1791.
