= Siege of Darwar =

Battle of the Third Anglo-Mysore War

- Part of the Third Anglo-Mysore War
Date	18 September 1790 – 3 April 1791
Location	Darwar, Mysore, India 15°27′30″N 75°00′30″E
Result	Anglo-Maratha victory

Belligerents
Maratha Empire; East India Company	Kingdom of Mysore

Commanders and leaders
(Maratha Empire) Parushram Patwardhan (East India Company) John Little (East India Company) Charles Frederick (East India Company) John Sartorius	Badr ul-Zaman Sahib

The Siege of Darwar was a 29 week siege of the fort at Dharwad in 1790 and 1791, then near the frontier, between the Kingdom of Mysore and the Maratha Empire. The Marathas, assisted by forces of the British East India Company, began the siege on 18 September 1790 and resulted with the surrender of the Mysorean garrison on 3 April 1791.
