= Capture of Hooly Honore =

1791 battle of the Third Anglo-Mysore War

- Part of the Third Anglo-Mysore War
Date	19 – 21 December 1791
Location	present-day Koodli, Karnataka, India
Result	Maratha-British victory

Belligerents
Maratha Confederacy; British East India Company	Kingdom of Mysore

Commanders and leaders
Parshuram Bhou; John Little	Unknown

The Capture of Hooly Honore, a town and fortress held by forces of the Kingdom of Mysore, occurred on 21 December 1791, after two days of siege by combined forces of the British East India Company and the Maratha Confederacy. The battle was part of a campaign during the Third Anglo-Mysore War by Maratha leader Purseram to recover Maratha territories taken by Hyder Ali in an earlier conflict between Mysore and the Marathas.
