= Third Anglo-Mysore War =

Conflict in India (1790–1792)

- Part of the Anglo-Mysore Wars
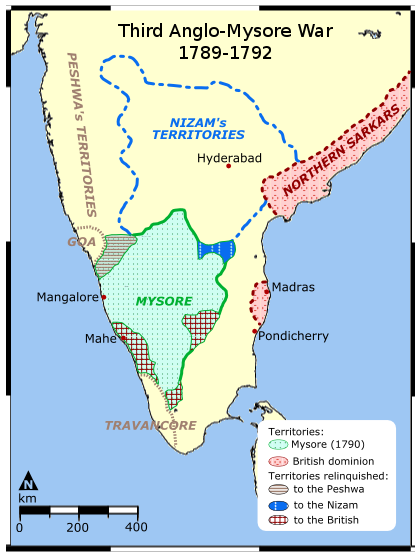
- A map of the war theatre
Date	28 December 1789 – 18 March 1792
Location	South India
Result	British victory
Territorial changes	Mysore loses about one-half of its territory to opponents.

Belligerents
Sultanate of Mysore: Arakkal Kingdom; Savanur State; France	Great Britain: East India Company; Maratha Empire; Travancore; Hyderabad

Commanders and leaders
Tipu Sultan (WIA); Purnaiah; Ghaffar Sahib; Reza Sahib (POW); Hamid Sahib; Martab Sahib; Buhadur Sahib; Badr ul-Zaman Sahib; Hussein Sahib; Jemaul Beig †; Sipahdar Sahib; Sher Sahib; Martab Khan; Hussain Ali Khan; Kamaluddin; Ali Raja; (Kingdom of France) Rustom Jung #	(United Kingdom) Robert Abercromby; (United Kingdom) Richard Strachan; (East India Company) William Medows; (East India Company) Charles Cornwallis (WIA); (East India Company) John Little; (East India Company) John Floyd; (East India Company) John Chalmers (POW); (East India Company) James Hartley; (Travancore) Dharma Raja; (Travancore) Kesava Pillai (WIA); (Travancore) Vaikom Pillai; (Maratha Empire) Parshuram Bhau; (Maratha Empire) Hari Pant; Teige Wunt; Mahabat Jung; Renuka Bhalerao

The Third Anglo-Mysore War (1789–1792) was a military conflict in Southern India between the Sultanate of Mysore and the East India Company, Maratha Empire, Kingdom of Travancore and the Nizam of Hyderabad. It was the third of four Anglo-Mysore Wars.

== Background ==
Tipu Sultan, the ruler of the Kingdom of Mysore, and his father Hyder Ali before him, had previously fought twice with the forces of the British East India Company. The First Anglo-Mysore War, fought in the 1760s, had ended inconclusively on both sides, with treaty provisions including promises of mutual assistance in future conflicts. British failure to support Mysore in conflicts with the Maratha Confederacy and other actions supportive of Mysore's enemies led Hyder to develop a dislike for the British.

After the British took the French-controlled port of Mahé in 1779, Hyder, who had been receiving military supplies through that port and had placed it under his protection, opened the Second Anglo-Mysore War. This war ended with the last British–Indian treaty with an Indian ruler on equal footing, the 1784 Treaty of Mangalore, which restored the status quo ante bellum under terms company officials such as Warren Hastings found extremely unfavourable for the British East India Company. Tipu, who gained control of Mysore after his father's death in December 1782, maintained an implacable hatred of the British, and declared not long after signing the 1784 treaty that he intended to continue battle with them given the opportunity. He refused to free British prisoners taken during the war, one of the conditions of the treaty. Tipu Sultan further strengthened his alliances with Ali Raja Bibi Junumabe II the Muslim ruler and the Mappila Muslim community of a region under the Zamorin of the Calicut empire, thus expanding the Sultanate of Mysore's sphere of influence.

British General Charles, 2nd Earl Cornwallis became the Governor-General of Bengal and Commander-in-Chief for the East India Company in 1786. While he formally abrogated agreements with the Marathas and Hyderabad that violated terms of the 1784 treaty, he sought informally to gain their support and that of the Nizam of Hyderabad, or at least their neutrality, in the event of conflict with Mysore.

Also, Pitt's "India Act" came into force in 1784, which made East India Company subordinated to the British crown, making the Company's power insignificant and marking the rise of direct British imperial control in India. Thus, unlike the earlier wars, where Tipu and his father confronted the Company, Tipu would now be fighting, in effect, against the British Empire.

== Events leading to war ==
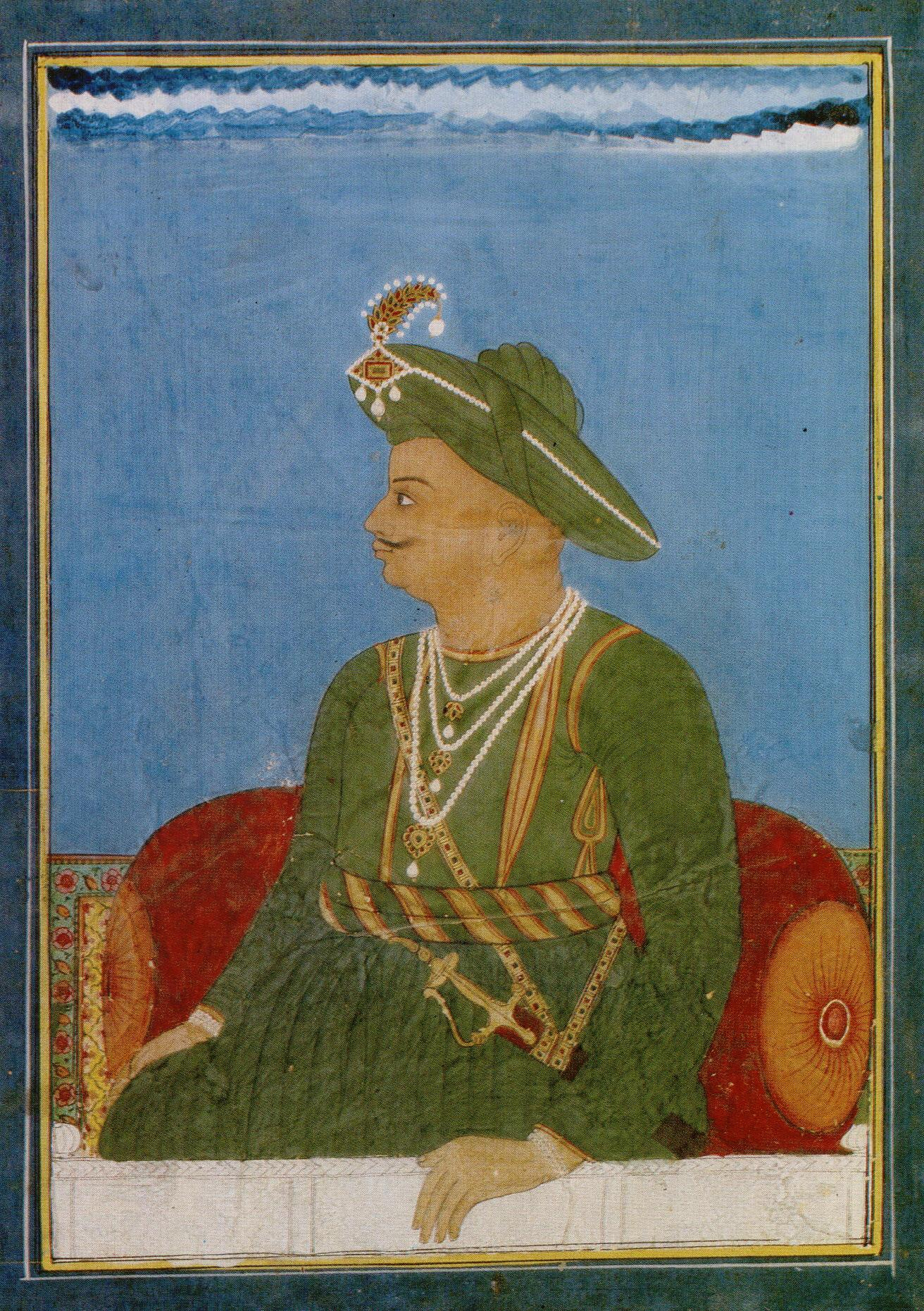
An anonymous portrait of Tipu Sultan, made during the Third Anglo-Mysore War.

In 1788, the company gained control of the Circar of Guntur, the southernmost of the Northern Circars, which the company had acquired under earlier agreements with the Nizam. In exchange, the company provided the Nizam with two battalions of company troops. Both of these acts placed British troops closer to Mysore, but also guaranteed the Nizam would support the British in the event of conflict.

Travancore had been a target of Tipu for acquisition or conquest since the end of the previous war. Indirect attempts to take over the kingdom had failed in 1788, and Archibald Campbell, the Madras president at the time, had warned Tipu that an attack on Travancore would be treated as a declaration of war on the company as per the Treaty of Mangalore. The rajah of Travancore also angered Tipu by extending fortifications along the border with Cochin into territory claimed by Mysore as belonging to its vassal state, and by purchasing from the Dutch East India Company two forts in the Kingdom of Cochin, a state paying tribute to Tipu Sultan.

In 1789 Tipu Sultan sent forces onto the Malabar Coast to put down a rebellion. Many people fled to Travancore, a state independent of Mysore and to Cochin, a state paying tribute to Tipu, in the wake of his advance. To follow them, Tipu began in the fall of 1789 to build up troops at Coimbatore in preparation for an assault on the Nedumkotta, a fortified line of defence built by Dharma Raja of Travancore to protect his domain. Cornwallis, observing this build-up, reiterated to Campbell's successor, John Holland, that an attack on Travancore should be considered a declaration of war, and met with a strong British response. Tipu, aware that Holland was not the experienced military officer that Campbell was, and that he did not have the close relationship that Campbell and Cornwallis had (both had served in North America in the American Revolutionary War), probably decided that this was an opportune time to attack.

== Early campaigns ==
On 29 December 1789, Tipu marched 14,000 troops from Coimbatore and attacked Nedumkotta. The first phase was a defeat for Tipu, when the Travancore forces under Kesava Pillai inflicted severe losses on the Tipu's forces and drove them back. While the Mysorean forces and their allies regrouped, Governor Holland, much to Cornwallis' dismay, engaged in negotiations with Tipu rather than mobilising the military. Cornwallis was on the brink of going to Madras to take command when he received word that Holland's replacement, General William Medows was about to arrive. Medows forcibly removed Holland, and set about planning operations against Tipu while building up troops at Trichinopoly.

=== Medows' campaign, 1790 ===
It was May before Medows was prepared to march. In the meantime, Tipu had renewed his attack on Travancore, and successfully breached the Nedumkotta line in late April 1790, despite the heavy losses inflicted by the Tranvancorean army. The Travancorean army made a strategic retreat to the further bank of the Periyar River and regrouped, preparing to contest the crossing of the river. The monsoon rains prevented the Mysorean army from fording the river and as Tipu received the news that the British campaign from Madras began to take shape as a significant threat, he retreated from Travancore.

The plan of attack developed by Medows called for a two-pronged attack, with the main thrust against the Coimbatore district and a diversionary thrust into Mysore from the northeast. Cornwallis was unhappy with this plan, due in part to the lateness of the season (combat being much more difficult during the monsoon season), and the lengthy supply lines from Madras that the plan entailed. However, he was willing to give Medows the opportunity for independent command.

Medows moved out of Trichinopoly in late May. Hampered by weather and equipment problems, his progress was slow. He met little resistance, as Tipu had withdrawn his main forces to the Mysore highlands. On 21 July, Medows entered Coimbatore unopposed, after having taken some of the smaller fortifications in the district by either abandonment or the immediate surrender of the garrison. His only opposition consisted of 4,000 cavalry under Sayed Sahib that Tipu had detached to observe and harass his operations; most of these were eventually driven across the Bhavani River by Medows' cavalry. Further strong points in the district fell, with Palghat and Dindigul requiring significant action to capture.

Although the campaign was successful in gaining complete control of the Coimbatore district, Medows had to divide his forces to hold it, with the largest detachments at Coimbatore, Palghat, and Sathyamangalam. The attack from Bengal, and a third from Bombay, were late in getting started when Tipu made his counterattack.

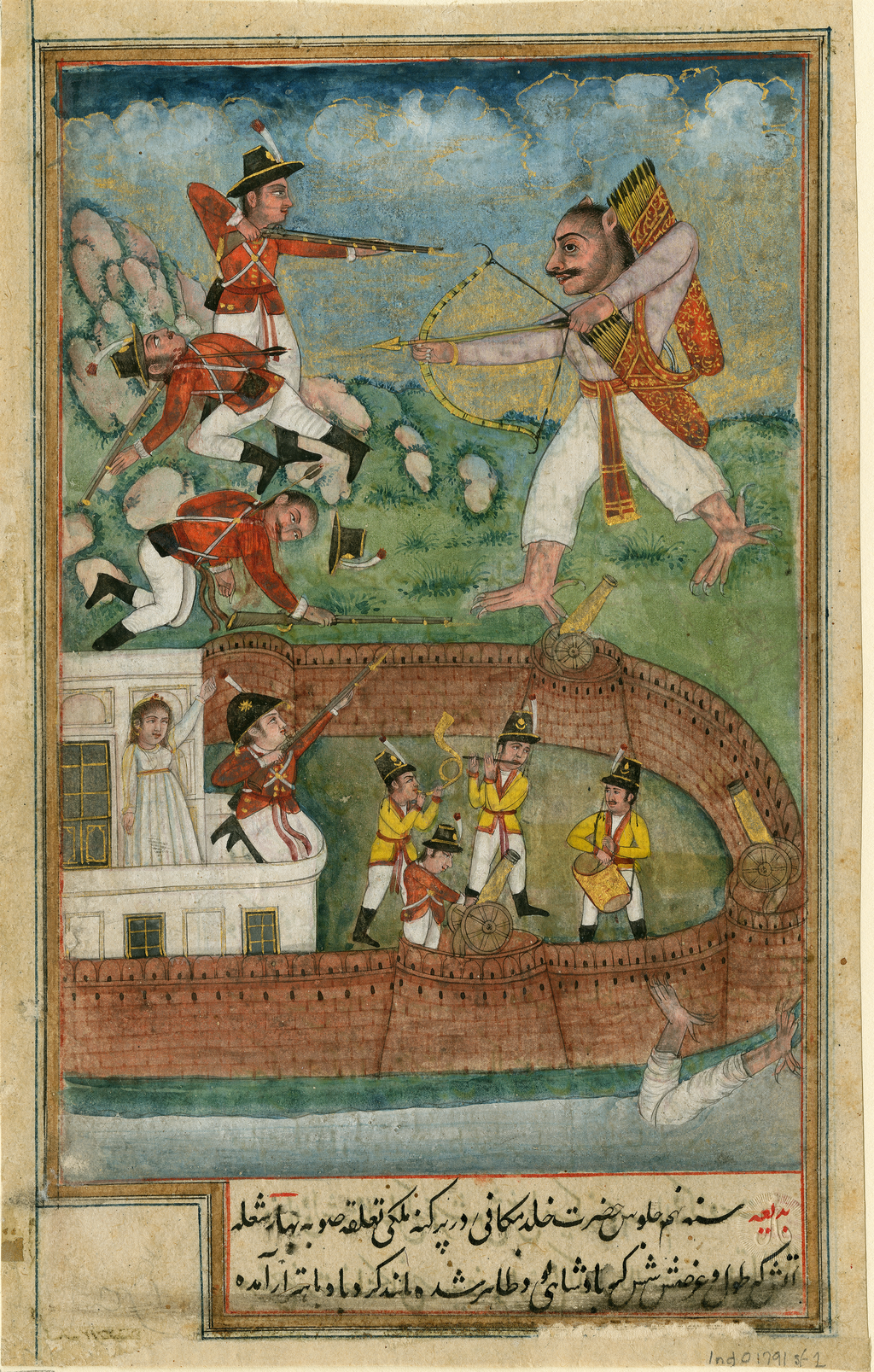
Unsigned watercolor by unknown Indian artist.

=== Tipu's counterattack ===
On 2 September, Tipu left Srirangapatnam at the head of a 40,000-man army. Descending the mountain passes beginning on 9 September, he began to move toward Sathyamangalam. While the 2,800-man garrison there withstood an initial assault from Tipu's force on 13 September, Captain John Floyd, the garrison commander, opted to withdraw. Under cover of night, they crossed the Bhavani and headed for Coimbatore. Tipu, slowed by heavy rains, sent 15,000 cavalry in pursuit. These eventually caught up and captured much of Floyd's baggage train, and continued to pursue the weary garrison. That evening, the full force of Tipu's army fell upon them as they camped at Cheyoor. A desperate stand by the infantry repulsed repeated assaults, and only the arrival of reinforcements sent by Medows rescued them.

Tipu then embarked on a campaign of harassing the British supply and communications, while screening the movements of his main force. In early November, he successfully misled Medows, moving much of his army north to attack the smaller Bengal force. This force, about 9,000 men led by Colonel Maxwell, had reached Kaveripattinam and strongly fortified his position. Unable to penetrate the defences, Tipu withdrew to the south on 14 November after learning that Medows was on his trail again. Medows and Maxwell joined forces on 17 November, and pursued Tipu, who had decided to make a move toward Trichinopoly. Unable to do more than pillage the town before Medows arrived, Tipu then moved on to rampage through the Carnatic, destroying towns and seizing supplies as he went. He ended up at the French outpost at Pondicherry, where he attempted to interest the French in supporting his efforts against the British. As France was then in the early stages of its revolution, these efforts were entirely unsuccessful. Medows at this point moved toward Madras, where he turned over command of his army to Lord Cornwallis.

=== Allied advances ===
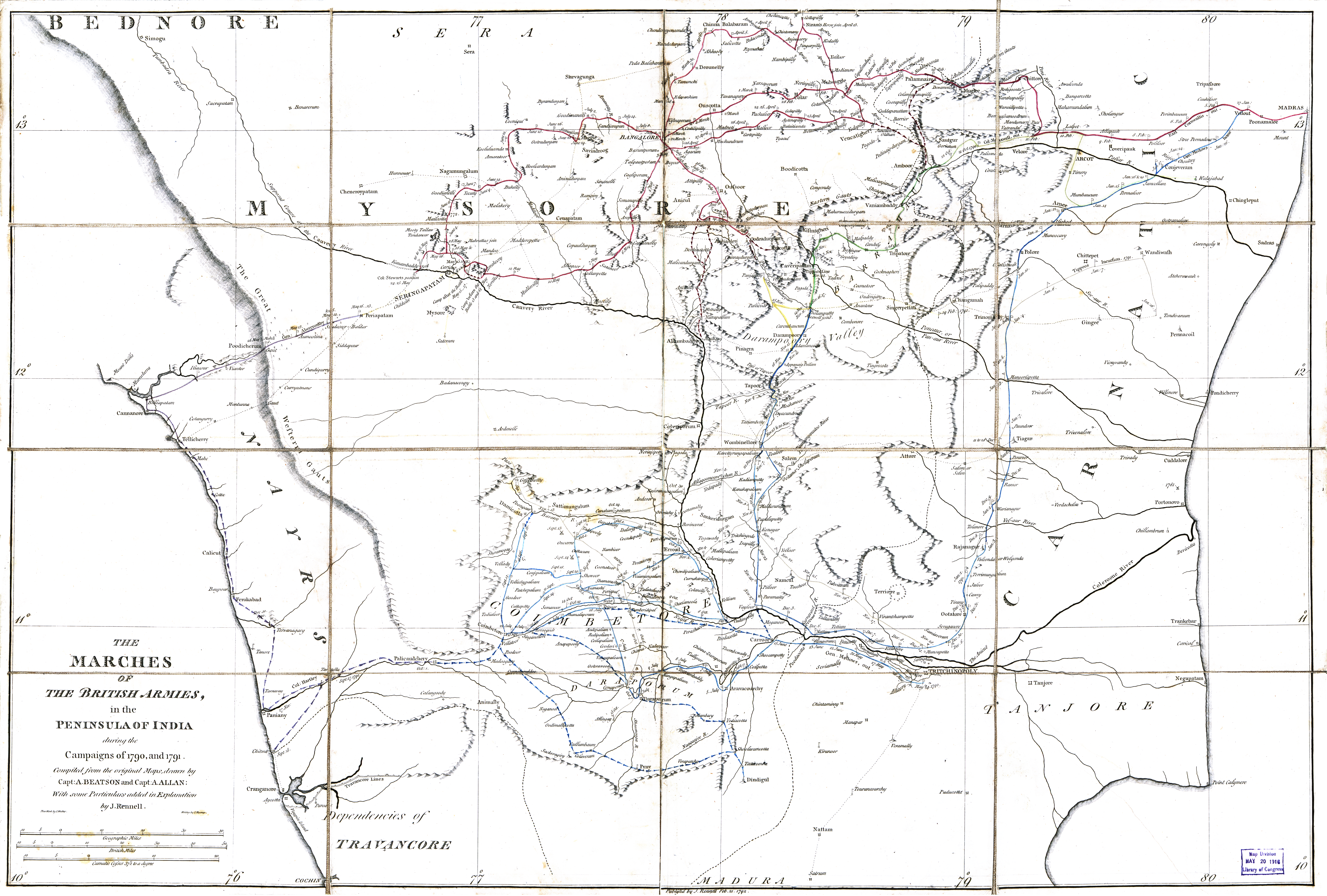
Map of movements in 1790-1791

During the summer of 1790, a Maratha army of some 30,000 under the command of Purseram Bhow, accompanied by a detachment of British troops from Bombay, began marching toward Mysore. The first several Mysorean outposts surrendered in the face of the large army, and it made steady if slow progress until it reached Darwar in September. The fort was weakly and indifferently besieged for 29 weeks, with the garrison finally surrendering on 3 April 1791. The army then continued to advance, reaching the Tungabhadra River in early May.

A second army, consisting of 25,000 cavalry and 5,000 infantry under the command of Hurry Punt assisted by a detachment of British soldiers from the Madras army, left Poona in January 1791, eventually reaching Kurnool without significant opposition. Hurry Punt went to confer with the Nizam, who had not crossed into Mysore in fear that Tipu's large army would overwhelm his before it could be joined to that of one of the other allies. On receiving word that Cornwallis had captured Bangalore and was moving toward the Mysorean capital, Srirangapatnam, Hurry Punt moved out from Kurnool, and made junction with Cornwallis on 28 May.

The Nizam's army, led by Mahabat Jung, advanced to Koppal, which they besieged in October 1790. Poor-quality cannons impeded the conduct of the siege, which was not successfully concluded until April 1791.

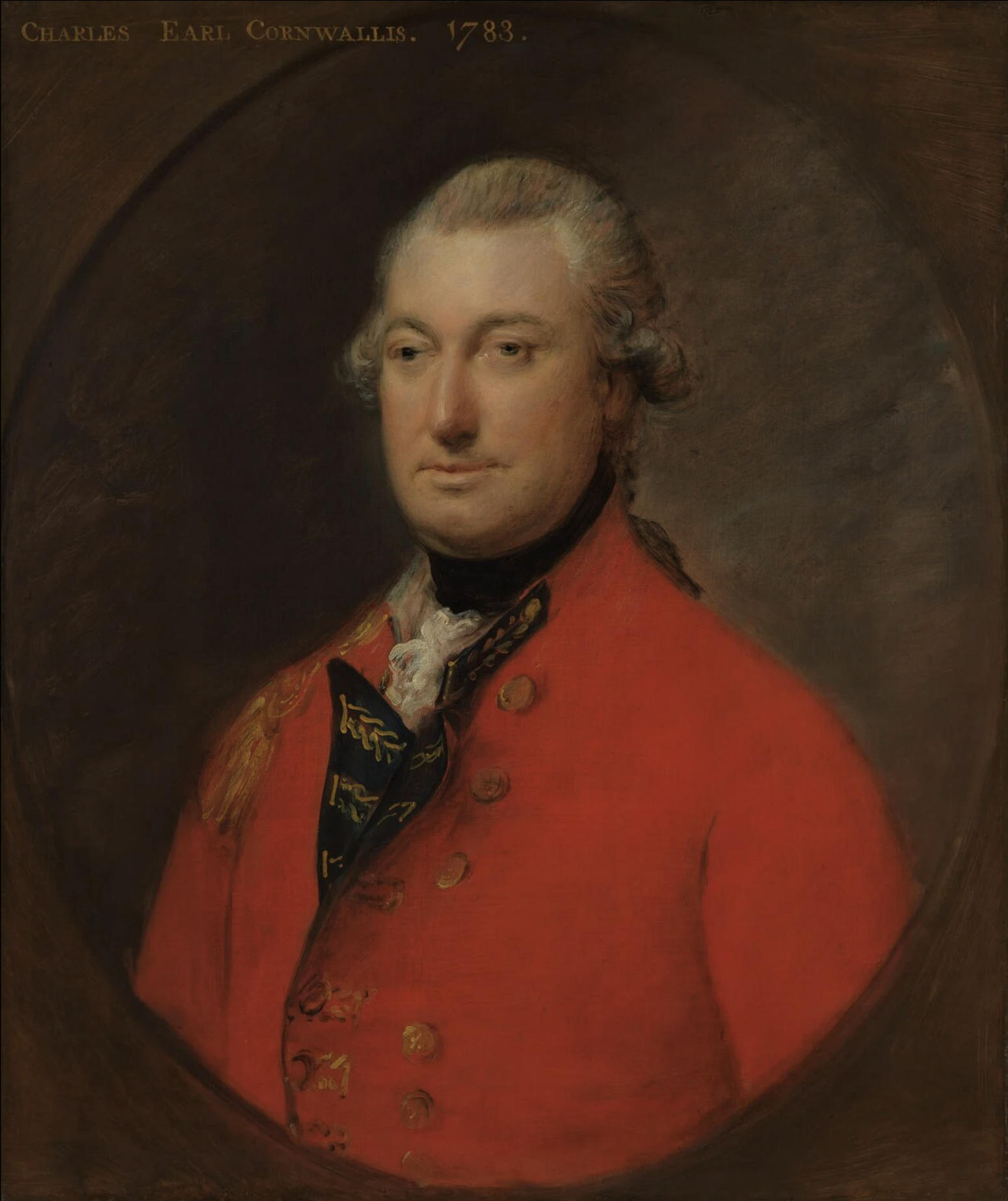
Earl Cornwallis, portrait by Thomas Gainsborough

=== British take the Malabar Coast ===
British forces succeeded in taking control of the Malabar Coast late in 1790. One force under Colonel Hartley gained a decisive victory at Calicut in December, while a second under Robert Abercromby routed the Sultan at Cannanore a few days later.

=== Nawab of Savanur ===
Territory associated with the Nawab of Savanur were lost to the Maratha Confederacy. Such events caused mistrust between the English and the agenda of the Peshwa.

== First advance on Seringapatam ==
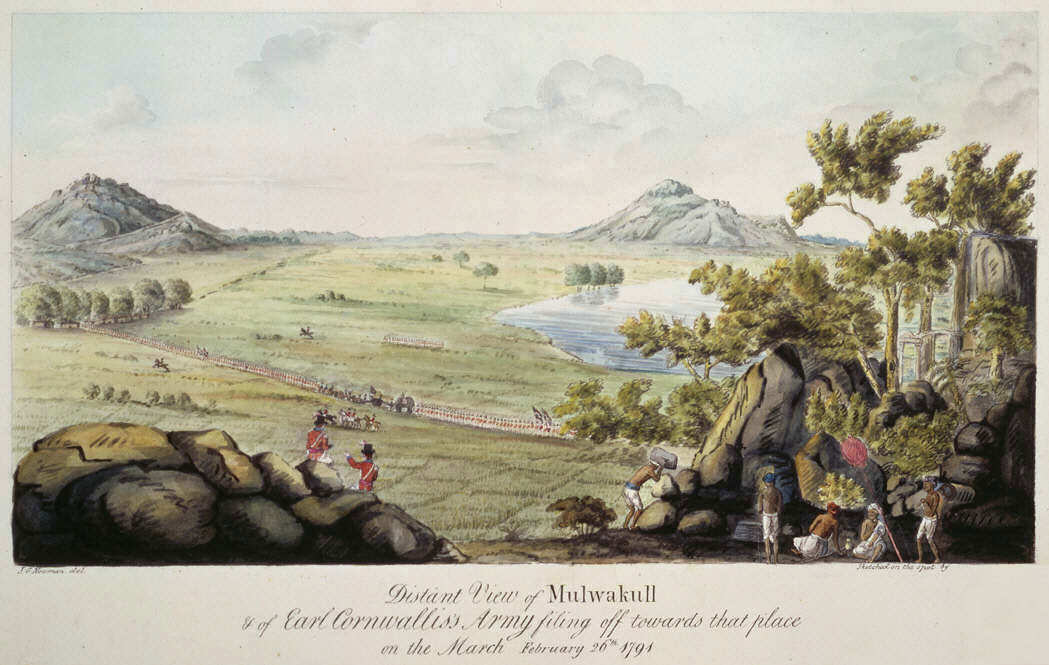
Cornwallis's army marching towards Malwakul

Cornwallis' first goal was to take the strong point of Bangalore, which would provide a base for future operations against Seringapatam. He hoped that this would stimulate the allies to step up their activity. Anticipating that Tipu would engage in a scorched-earth campaign in the highlands of Mysore, he made significant arrangements for provisions. To assist in the hauling of supplies and heavy armaments he also retained a significant number of elephants.

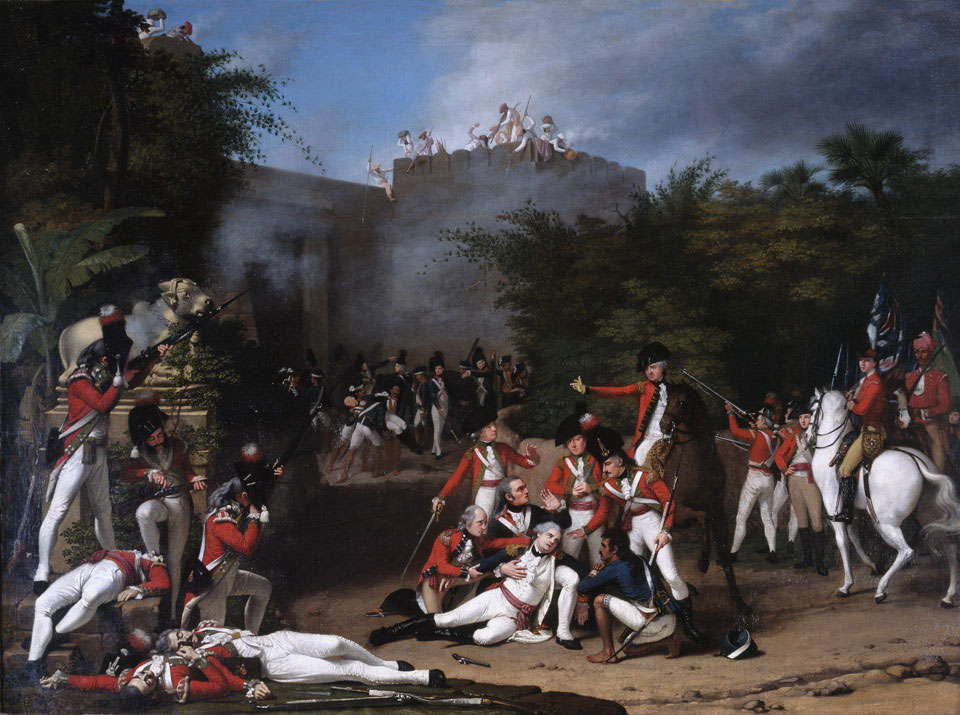
The Death of Colonel Moorehouse, Madrass Artillery, at the Storming of the Pettah Gate of Bangalore, 7 March 1791

Cornwallis took over the main Company army at Vellore on 29 January 1791. A week later he marched west, as if to pass through the Eastern Ghats at that point. This prompted Tipu to abandon Pondicherry and make haste for Bangalore, where he perceived his harem to be at some risk. Although Tipu placed defences on some of the passes, Cornwallis, after a number of feints, turned sharply north, and crossed the mountains at the Muglee Pass on 21 February against no opposition. He then continued to advance, against virtually no resistance, until he was very nearly before the gates of Bangalore on 5 March. Tipu had fortified the city and supplied the garrison, but he stayed with his main force on the outskirts of the Company positions as Cornwallis began siege operations. After six weeks of siege, in which the company had to repeatedly beat off attacks and skirmishes from Tipu, they successfully stormed the citadel.

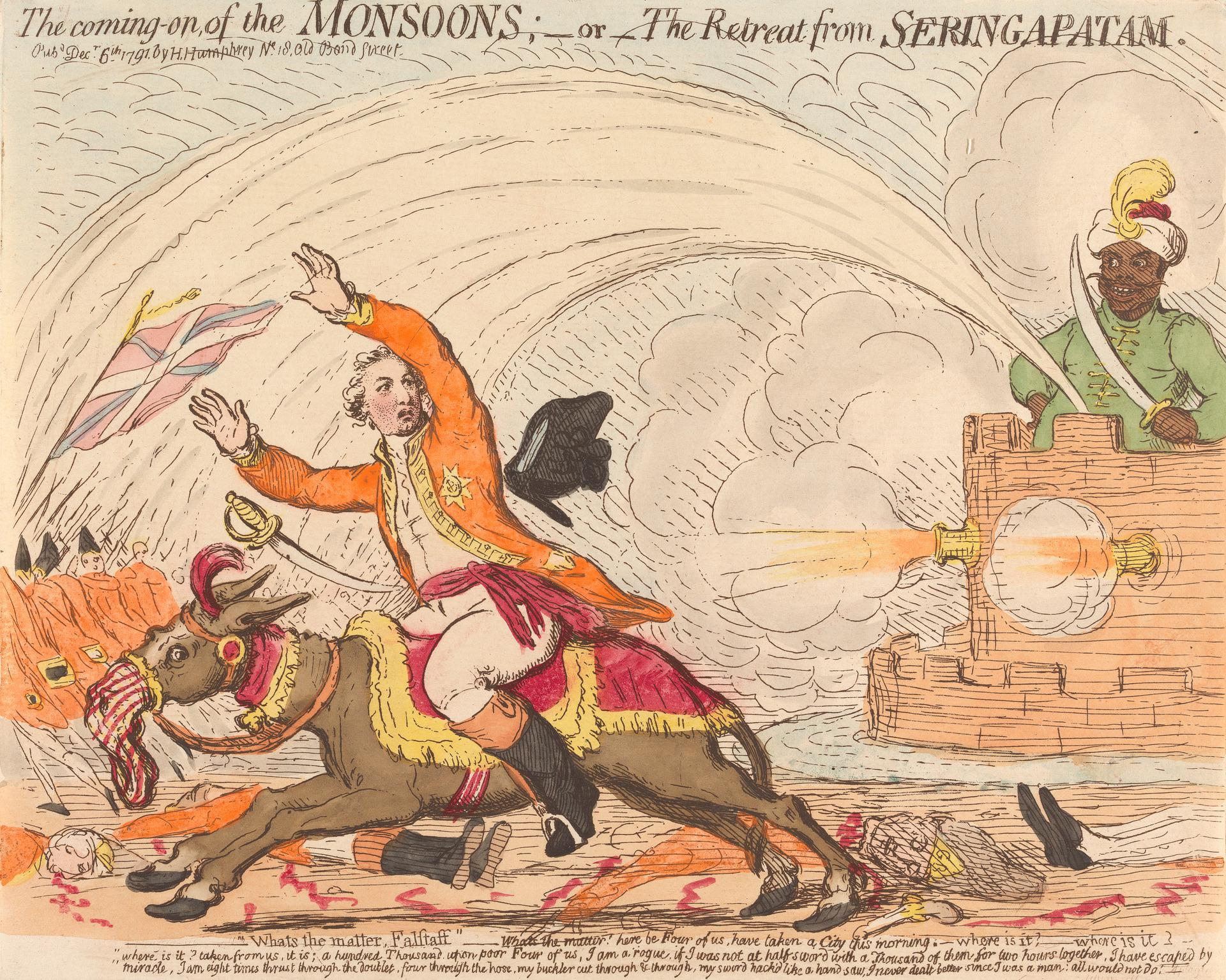
Political cartoon by James Gillray, making fun of Lord Cornwallis after his 1791 retreat from Seringapatam

After securing Bangalore, Cornwallis turned his army north to meet a supply caravan and the Nizam's army, which took place on 12 April about 80 miles (130 km) north of Bangalore. Turning back toward Bangalore, Cornwallis found the Nizam's men to be noticeably unhelpful. He had hoped that the addition of native cavalry to the army would assist in offsetting Tipu's advantage in that quarter, but the Nizam's men, commanded by Teige Wunt, were interested in plunder and in living off the army's supplies instead of foraging and scouting against Tipu.

The Company then embarked on a series of operations to secure most of the area around Bangalore before moving on to Seringapatam. When Cornwallis was seeking a ford at which to cross the Cauvery River, Tipu offered him battle at a ford near the village of Arakere. In the ensuing battle on 15 May, Cornwallis flanked Tipu's position and drove him to retreat behind Seringapatam's walls. Since the Marathan forces were apparently not nearby, and it seemed unlikely that Abercromby would arrive with the Malabar forces, and his army was on the verge of starvation, Cornwallis then made the difficult decision on 22 May to destroy his siege train and retreat. Only three days later, the Maratha army arrived, Tipu having successfully prevented most of its messengers from reaching Cornwallis before then.

Cornwallis' retreat to Bangalore exposed the Coimbatore district to Tipu's forces. On 11 June, 2,000 Mysorean forces laid siege to Coimbatore. Lieutenant Chalmers, the garrison commander, ignored orders from Cornwallis to withdraw if attacked in force, and chose to fight, in spite of having less than 300 men and inferior gunpowder. His defence was spirited, and reinforcements from Palgautcherry prompted him to sortie and successfully take the defenders' supply train in August. Eight thousand more Mysoreans then arrived, but Chalmers held out until 6 November. In violation of the agreed terms of surrender Chalmers and his men were taken prisoner.

== Second advance on Seringapatam ==
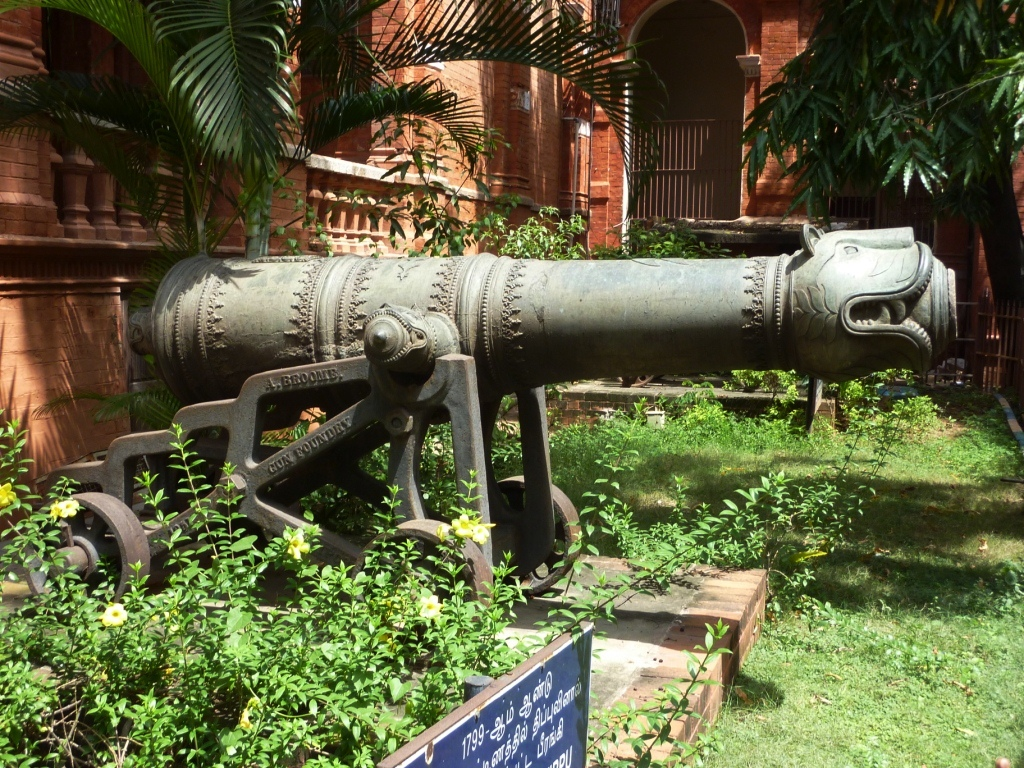
Cannon used by Tipu Sultan's forces at the battle of Seringapatam 1799

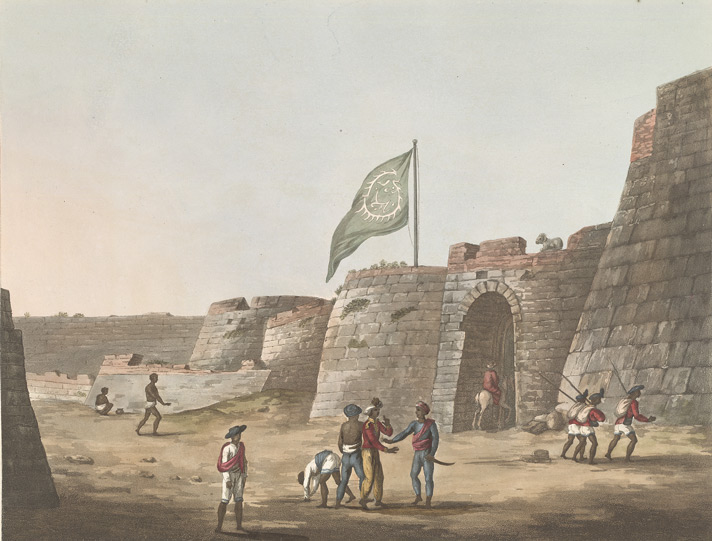
The flag of the Kingdom of Mysore at the entrance into the fort of Bangalore.

Following the allied retreat to Bangalore, the armies of Purseram Bhow and Teige Wunt left the grand army to pursue territorial gains in Mysore's northern territories. Purseram Bhow, desirous of recapturing the Bednore district that Tipu's father Hyder had taken in an earlier war, captured Hooly Honore and Shimoga, although British forces attached to his army did much of the necessary work. Only the threatened arrival of a detachment from Tipu's army prevented him from laying siege to Bednore itself. Bhow did not return to the grand army until after peace negotiations began at Seringapatam.

Whereas the earl's younger brother, Commodore William Cornwallis, was engaged in the naval Battle of Tellicherry, Charles spent the remainder of 1791 securing his supply lines to Madras. To this end he laid siege to Nundydroog in November and Savendroog in December, both of which fell after unexpectedly modest efforts. He also ordered a massive supply operation to ensure that adequate supplies and pay for his army and those of the allies would be available. Spies were sent to infiltrate Tipu's camps, and he began to receive more reliable reports of the latter's troop strengths and disposition.

The relations between Cornwallis and the allies were difficult. The Marathan military leaders, Purseram Bhow and Hurry Punt, had to be bribed to stay with the army, and Cornwallis reported the Hyderabadi forces to be more of a hindrance than a help; one British observer wrote that they were a "disorderly rabble" and "not very creditable to the state of military discipline at Hyderabad".

On 25 January, Sir Cornwallis moved from Savendroog toward Seringapatam, while Abercromby again advanced from the Malabar Coast. While Tipu's men harassed the column, they did not impede its progress. Cornwallis established a chain of outposts to protect the supply line from Bangalore. When the massive army reached the plains before Seringapatam on 5 February, Tipu's began showering the force with rockets. Cornwallis responded with a night-time attack to dislodge Tipu from his lines. After a somewhat confused battle, Tipu's forces were flanked, and he retreated into the city, and Cornwallis began siege operations. On 12 February, Abercromby arrived with the Bombay army, and the noose began to tighten around Tipu. By 23 February, Tipu began making overtures for peace talks, and hostilities were suspended the next day when he agreed to preliminary terms.

== Peace ==
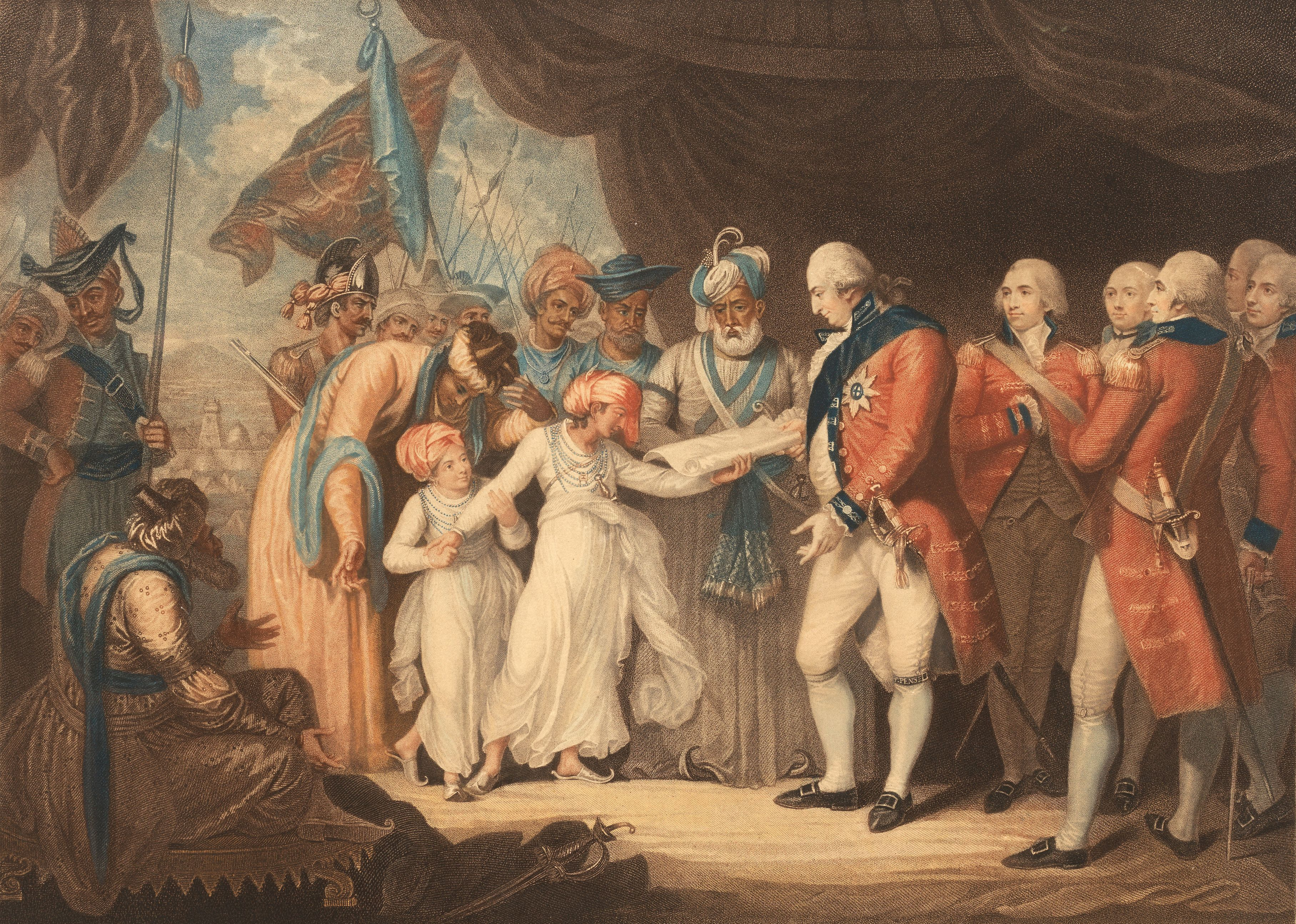
Cornwallis receiving Tipu's sons as hostages on 26 February 1792

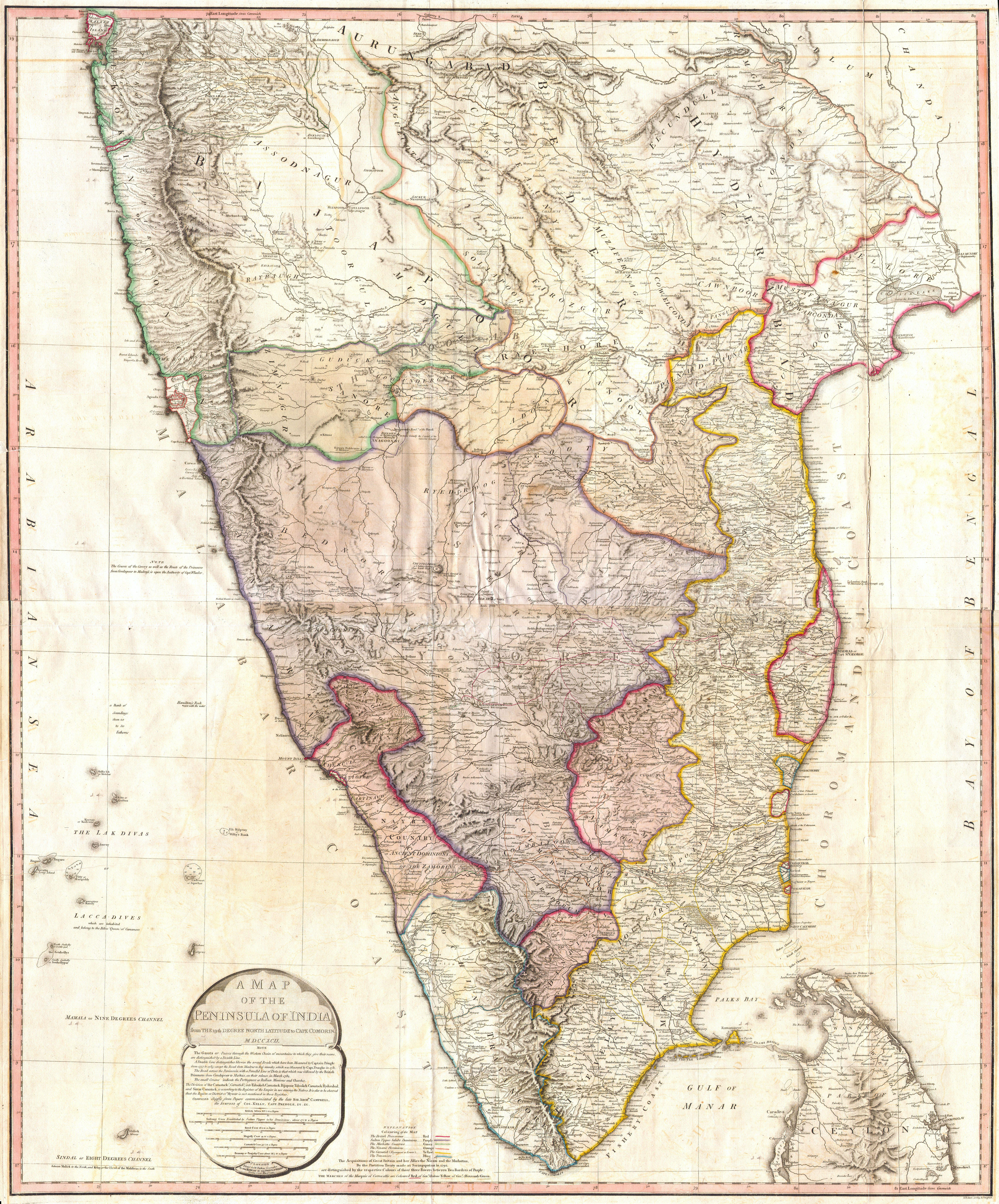
1794 map showing "The Territories ceded by Tipu Sultan to the Different Powers"

Among the preliminary terms that Cornwallis insisted on was that Tipu surrender two of his sons as hostages as a guarantee for his execution of the agreed terms. On 26 February, his two young sons were formally delivered to Cornwallis amid great ceremony and gun salutes by both sides. Cornwallis, who was not interested in significantly extending the company's territory, or in turning most of Mysore over to the Marathas and Hyderabad, negotiated a division of one half of Mysorean territory, to be divided by the allies, in which the company's acquisition would improve its defences. He later wrote, "If we had taken Seringapatam and killed Tippoo, [...] we must either have given that capital to the Marathas (a dangerous boon) or have set up some miserable pageant of our own, to be supported by the Company's troops and treasures, and to be plundered by its servants." The territories taken deprived Mysore of much of its coastline; Mysore was also obligated to pay some of the allied war costs. On 18 March 1792, Tipu agreed to the terms and signed the Treaty of Seringapatam, ending hostilities.

== Consequences ==
A fourth and final war was fought between the British and Mysore in 1799, in which Seringapatam was taken, and Tipu was killed in its defence. The victors, rather than partitioning the country, forced Tipu's family into exile and restored control of Mysore to the Wadiyars.

One notable military advance championed by Tipu Sultan was the use of mass attacks with rocket brigades, called cushoons, in the army. The weapons used by the cushoons sufficiently impressed the British during the Third and Fourth Mysore Wars to inspire William Congreve to develop Congreve rockets.

Cornwallis was raised to the title of Marquess for his actions in the war, while the native Indian soldiers under his command were awarded the Mysore Medal.

== Assessment ==
Tipu sultan had turned the wars against the British, Kerala and the Marathas into a religious war, as evidenced by his personal letters. He massacred numerous Hindus and Christians, not sparing even the women and children and destroyed numerous churches, Hindu temples and even synagogues. Tipu has been a controversial figure and criticised for his repression of Hindus and Christians. Various sources describe the massacres, imprisonment, forced conversion, and circumcision of Hindus (Kodavas of Coorg and Nairs of Malabar) and Christians (Catholics of Mangalore) and the destruction of churches and temples which are cited as evidence for his religious intolerance. He also reneged on his promises of humanely treating and releasing the prisoners of wars, e.g. in one case noted by a chronicler, he killed a local king who had submitted to him and had his body dragged through the city. Many Christian missionaries also documented his torture of local Christians and destroying their churches and temples.

However, others have pointed out that Tipu's actions against the Hindus of Coorg and Malabar, and the Nairs were in consequence were due to political motives, after they had rebelled "six times" and he had forgiven them, similar to how he punished the Christians of Kanara during the Second Anglo-Mysore War after they had committed treason, rendering invaluable help to the English. In fact, a Maratha raid had destroyed a Hindu temple at Sringeri during the war in 1791, committing sacrilege by plundering the temple and killing or wounding locals, which included locals and Brahamins, leading its Swami to plea for help from Tipu, who quickly dispatched men and funds to help restore the temple. That Tipu had appointed various Hindus to high posts at court and as officers in his army during the war stands contrary to the claims that he turned the battle into a religious war, and given that Tipu had given grants to numerous temples, and never prevented Hindus from worshipping, funded the construction of a Gopur temple in Conjeeveram during this war, and even participated in and bore some of the costs of the local Hindu festivals which occurred during his stay.

== Notes ==
Preceded by Second Anglo-Mysore War	Anglo-Mysore Wars	Succeeded by Fourth Anglo-Mysore War
Preceded by Second Anglo-Mysore War	Indo-British conflicts	Succeeded by Fourth Anglo-Mysore War
