= Battle of Shimoga =

1791–92 conflict in the Third Anglo-Mysore War

Capture of Shimoga
- Part of the Third Anglo-Mysore War
Date	29 December 1791 – 3 January 1792 (6 days)
Location	Shimoga, Mysore, India 13°56′N 75°34′E
Result	Anglo-Maratha victory

Belligerents
Maratha Empire; East India Company	Kingdom of Mysore

Commanders and leaders
(Maratha Empire) Parshuram Bhou (East India Company) John Little	Reza Sahib (POW)

The Capture of Shimoga, a town and fortress held by forces of the Kingdom of Mysore, occurred on 3 January 1792, after a preliminary battle with the attacking forces of the British East India Company and the Marathas, not far from the town on 29 December, had scattered much of its defending army. The defenders surrendered after the fort's walls were breached. The battle was part of a campaign during the Third Anglo-Mysore War by Maratha leader Purseram Bhow to recover Maratha territories taken by Hyder Ali in an earlier conflict between Mysore and the Marathas. By the end of the siege, Reza Sahib a leading Mysore commander, was among the captured.
