= Rustom Jung =

Henry François Charles Pompée (25 January 1732 – 7 October 1790) also known as Chevalier de Lalee or Rustom Jung was a French mercenary who served in southern Indian armies belonging to Indian chiefs including Haider Ali. Referred to sometimes as Monsieur Lally his name is confused with Thomas Arthur, comte de Lally and sometimes referred to as the younger Lally.

Pompée was born in Rumilly (Haute-Savoie) to Charles Pompée de Motz de la Salle and Dame Louise Marie Portier du Bellair. Coming from a family of nobility he was one of seventeen children. The oldest brother inherited the title Baron de Metz and two brothers were in the church, one becoming a professor of theology, another served as a Canon. He studied at the College of Rumilly and became a novice of the Bénédictines of Talloires but gave up the clergy to join in the Compagnie des Indes and sailed for Pondicherry on Count Lally-Tollendal's expédition. They were captured by the English and he was discharged. He then worked for Basalat Jung, brother of the Nizam in Adoni and Raichur.

In 1773, he went by the name of Rustom Jung and was involved in an attack on Bellary. He offered his services to the Mahrattas but was rejected and he then served Haider Ali in Arcot against the English in 1783.

He moved through Polur, Thiruvanamalai and moved to Conjevaram. During Third Anglo-Mysore War he saw action at Mayavaram, but died in Dharapuram from an illness. A notice in the Calcutta Gazette however claimed that he died from wounds during action at Satyamangalam on 14 September. He was buried at Dharapuram.
