= Capture of Cannanore =

Battle of the Third Anglo-Mysore War

- Part of the Third Anglo-Mysore War
Date	17 December 1790
Location	Cannanore, India 11°52′28.2″N 75°22′13.4″E
Result	British victory

Belligerents
Great Britain; East India Company; Nair militia	Kingdom of Mysore; Arakkal Kingdom

Commanders and leaders
(Kingdom of Great Britain) Robert Abercromby	Beevi Sultana II

Strength
3,000+ British soldiers 2,000 Nairs	Unknown

The Capture of Cannanore during the Third Anglo-Mysore War took place on 17 December 1790. Forces of the British East India Company, led by General Robert Abercromby, began besieging Cannanore (now known as Kannur), held by troops of Mysore and of the Sultan Ali Raja of Cannanore on 14 December. After gaining control of the high ground commanding the city's main fort, the defenders surrendered. The British victory, along with the taking of Calicut by a separate force a few days earlier, secured their control over the Malabar Coast.

== Order of battle ==
British forces

- 77th (Hindoostan) Regiment of Foot
- 1st Regiment of Bombay Native Infantry
- 2,000 Nairs

Mysorean forces

- 5,000+ Mysoreans
- Mappilas

== See also ==
- Mysore invasion of Kerala
