= Battle of Tirurangadi =

Battle of the Third Anglo-Mysore War

Battle of Calicut
- Part of the Third Anglo-Mysore War
Date	7–12 December 1790
Location	Malabar coast
Result	British victory

Belligerents
East India Company; Kingdom of Travancore	Kingdom of Mysore

Commanders and leaders
(East India Company) James Hartley	Martab Khan; Hussain Ali Khan

The Battle of Tirurangadi (also called the Battle of Calicut) was a series of engagements that took place between 7 and 12 December 1790 at Tirurangadi near the port of Calicut on the Malabar Coast of India, during the Third Anglo-Mysore War.

A British Bombay Army force landed at Tellicherry and with the aid of sepoys and horses provided by Travancore, defeated Tipu's commander, Hussain Ali Khan, at Calicut. Abercromby then went on to capture "all of Malabar."

== See also ==
- Kingdom of Mysore
