= Siege of Bangalore =

1791 siege of the Third Anglo-Mysore War

- Part of the Third Anglo-Mysore War
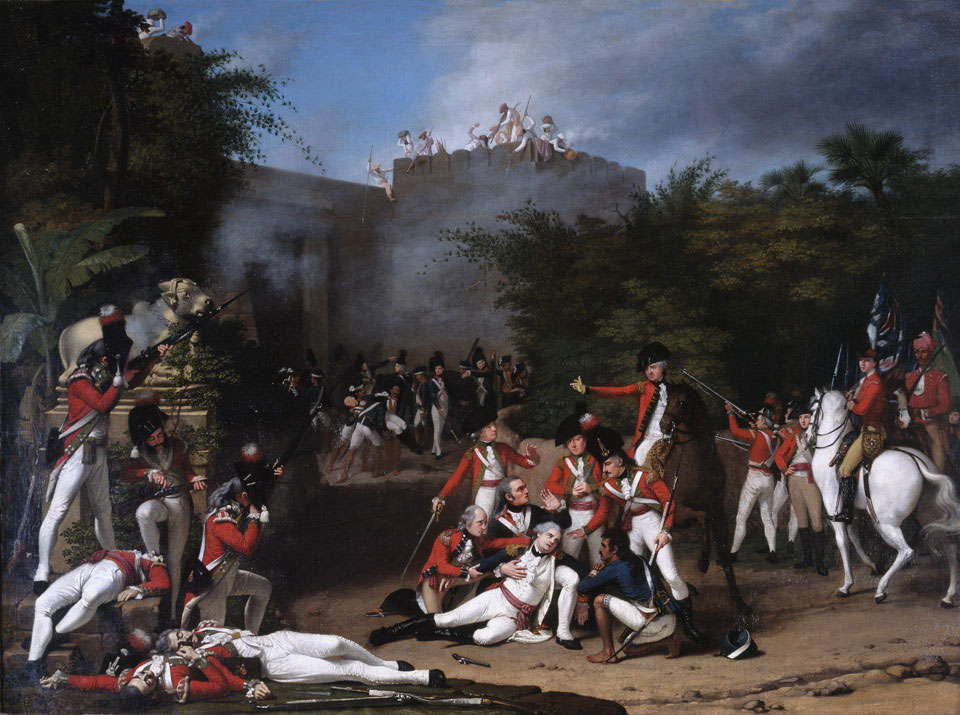
- British troops attacking Bangalore on 7 March during the siege
Date	5 February – 21 March 1791
Location	Bangalore, Mysore 12°58′44″N 77°35′30″E
Result	British victory

Belligerents
East India Company; Great Britain	Kingdom of Mysore

Commanders and leaders
(East India Company) Charles Cornwallis	Tipu Sultan (outside the lines); Sipahdar Sahib (lower fort); Buhadur Sahib (upper fort)

Strength
Unknown	Unknown

Casualties and losses
130 killed 700 wounded	1,000+ killed

The siege of Bangalore was a siege of the town and fortifications of Bangalore during the Third Anglo-Mysore War by forces of the British East India Company, led by Charles, Earl Cornwallis against a Mysorean garrison, while Tipu Sultan, Mysore's ruler, harried the camps and positions of the besiegers. Arriving before the town on 5 February 1791, Cornwallis captured the town by assault on 7 February, and after six weeks of siege, stormed the fortress on 21 March.

== Background ==
The Bangalore fort was described as follows, in about 1791:

Bangalore, like Madras, had a fort, with a pettah, or fortified town, outside it. This lay-out was a feature of almost all the cities or settlements in India, the fort providing a place of refuge for most of the inhabitants if the pettah was in danger of capture. The fort at Bangalore had a perimeter of about one mile; it was of solid masonry, surrounded by a wide ditch which was commanded from 26 towers placed at intervals along the ramparts. To its north lay the pettah, several miles in circumference and protected by an indifferent rampart, a deep belt of thorn and cactus, and a small ditch. Altogether Bangalore was not a place which invited attack.

— Sandes, Lt Col E.W.C. (1933) The Military Engineer In India, Vol 1

== Siege ==
Tipu Sultan followed Cornwallis' army, placing him in the awkward position of having an undefeated enemy army at his back while besieging the a strong fortification. Tipu kept away hoping to take assault when underway in flank. Over the next twelve days, two companies of the Madras Pioneers provided sappers for eight batteries, dug several parallels and a trench up to the fort ditch. Captain Kyd, of the Bengal Engineers then managed to breach the walls with mortars, and Cornwallis elected to attack secretly on the night of 21 March 1791. The Madras Pioneers, led by Lieutenant Colin Mackenzie, crossed the ditch with scaling ladders, mounted the breach and entered the fort, while the artillery engaged the fort with blank ammunition. With a breach made, the main stormers rushed in and the fort was captured after a hand-to hand fight in which a thousand defenders were killed. Cornwallis captured the fort and secured the force against Tipu.

The Madras Pioneers, went on to make Bangalore their permanent home.

Siege of Bangalore, 1791

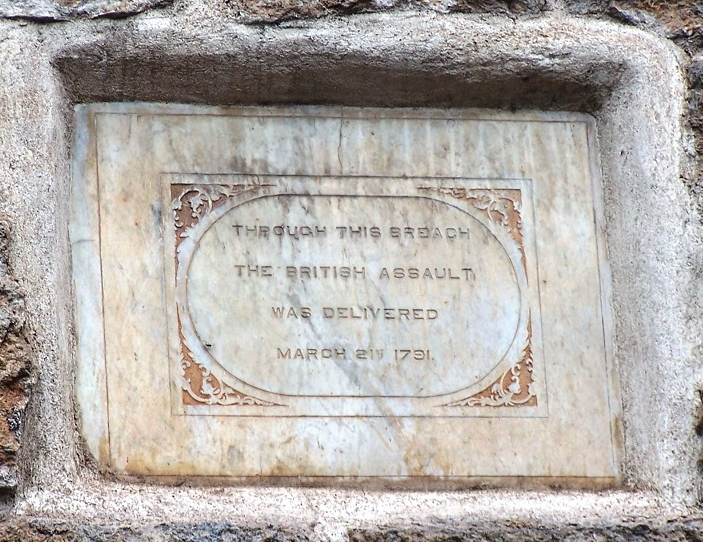
Siege of Bangalore (1791) British Plaque, Bangalore Fort

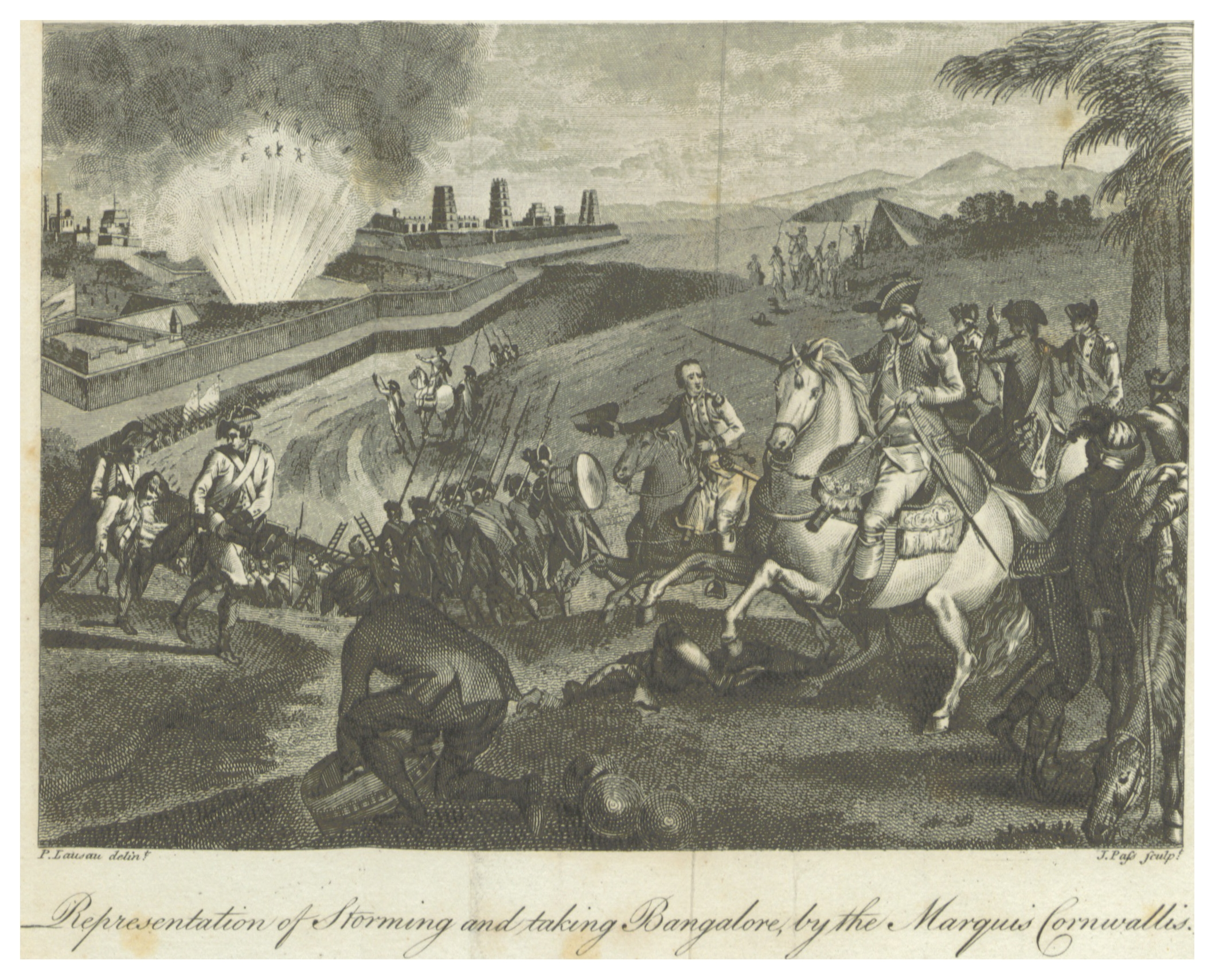
Stroming and taking Bangalore, by the Marquis Cornwallis

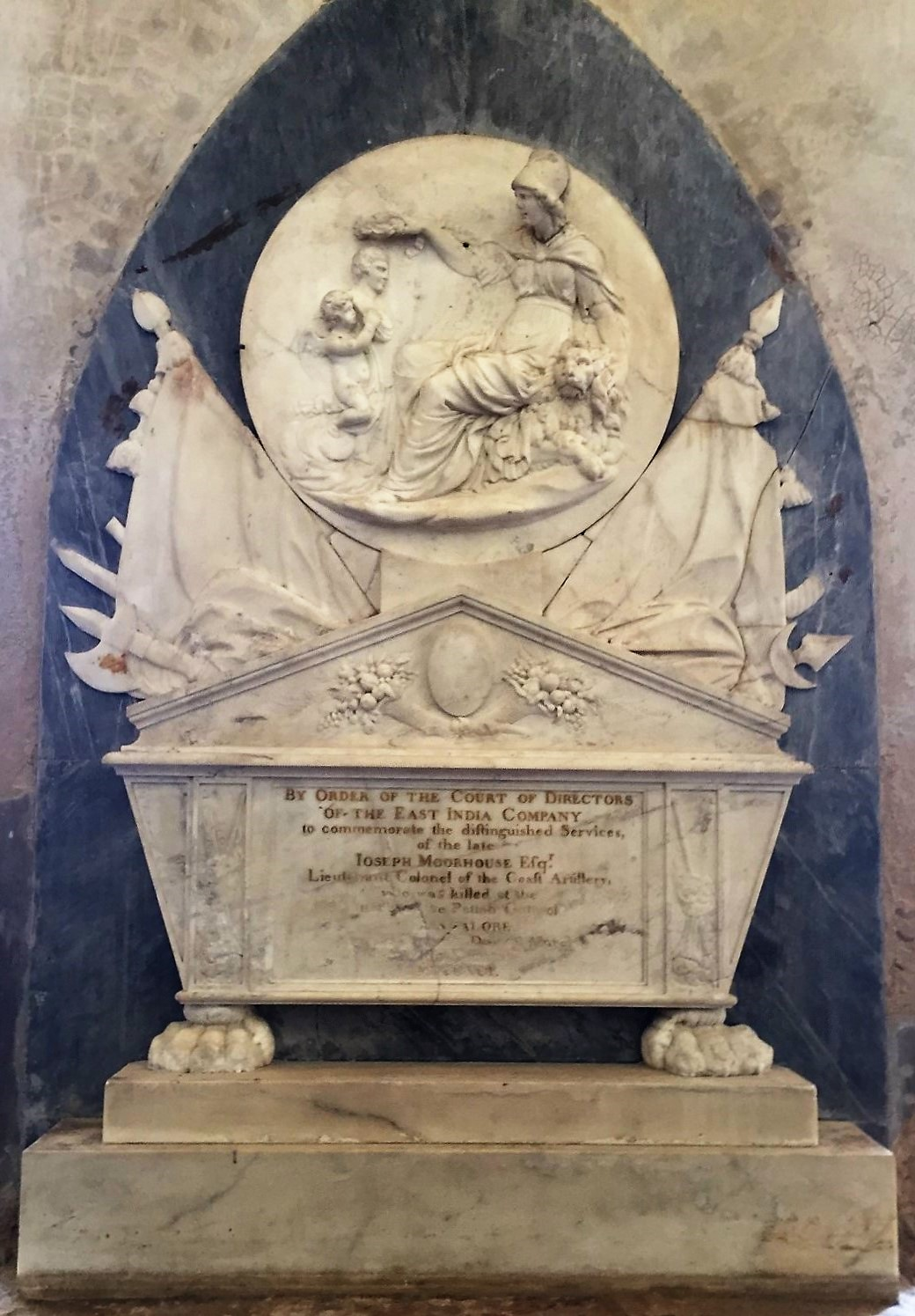
Memorial to Joseph Moorhouse, St. Mary's Church, Madras

According to the British chronicler Mark Wilks, the British faced respectable resistance. However, the resistance lasted a few hours, and the fort fell to the British. Loss of the Bangalore Fort resulted in severe loss of morale amongst Tippu's soldiers.

The British occupied the Bangalore Fort only for a year, as it was returned to Tippu Sultan, following the defeat of Tippu Sultan in 1792 and the consequent Treaty of Seringapatam. However, after the fall of Tippu Sultan in 1799, the Bangalore Fort came under British control. A British garrison was stationed at the fort till 1888, when it was handed over to the civil authorities.

Today, very little remains to remind people of the battle, except for a plaque (see picture), which reads "Through this breach the British assault was delivered. 21 March 1791."

== Fort Cemetery and the Demolished Cenotaph ==
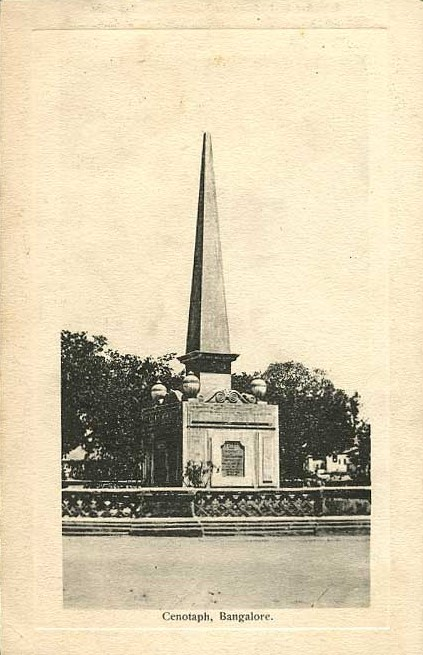
Cenotaph, Bangalore

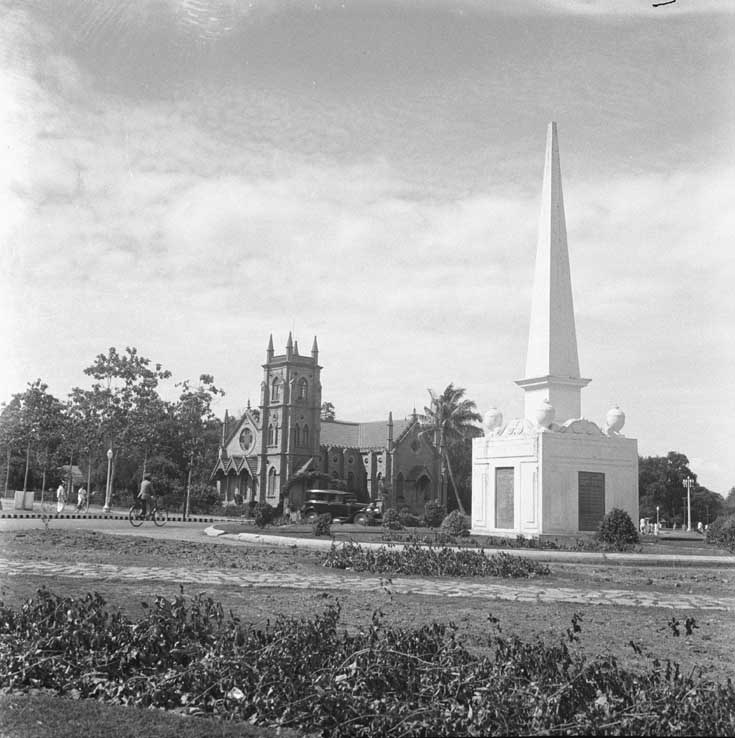
Memorial Obelisk raised for the British and Indian Officers and Men who fell in the siege of Bangalore, 1791. The Hudson Memorial Church can be seen in the background. (The memorial was demolished on 28 October 1964)

The Fort Cemetery, where the officers who fell in the siege of Bangalore were buried, is illustrated in Robert Home's book, Select Views in Mysore, the country of Tippoo Sultan, published by Robert Bowyer, London, 1794. Home's painting shows the graves of Captains James Smith, James Williamson, John Shipper, Nathaniel Daws and Jeremiah Delany, Lieutenant Conan and Lieutenant-Colonel Gratton. As recorded in 1895, The cemetery was located just outside the Fort Church, with the church being responsible for its maintenance. The cemetery had cypress trees, rose bushes and flowers. The Government of Mysore, had constructed a wall and gate for the cemetery.

However, as recorded in 1912 by Rev. Frank Penny in his book The Church in Madras: Volume II, the cemetery no longer existed. The record of the offers who fell in the battle for the Bangalore Fort in 1791, were transferred to the cenotaph, raised by the Government of Mysore. The 35 feet tall cenotaph pillar was raised in memory of the lives lost in the siege of Bangalore, opposite to the present Corporation Building, and Hudson Memorial Church. Kannada activists led by Vatal Nagaraj and others made violent demands to demolish the cenotaph. As a result of these protests, the Bangalore City Corporation demolished the memorial on 28 October 1964, and the name of the road was also changed from Cenotaph Road to Nrupathunga Road. The engraved stones were destroyed, and not even a single stone remains. A small piece of the Cenotaph has been placed as a bench in the Corporation Office. Historians, and heritage lovers of Banaglore City are however enraged with this destruction of history. Well known blogger on Bangalore, Samyuktha Harshitha, calls it as 'official vandalism', comparing it with the destruction of the Bamiyan statues.

== Sketches ==
The siege of Bangalore, resulted in a number of sketches by artists such as James Hunter, Thomas Daniell, William Daniell, Robert Home, etc. These sketches provide a detailed record of the landscape around the Bangalore Fort at that period.

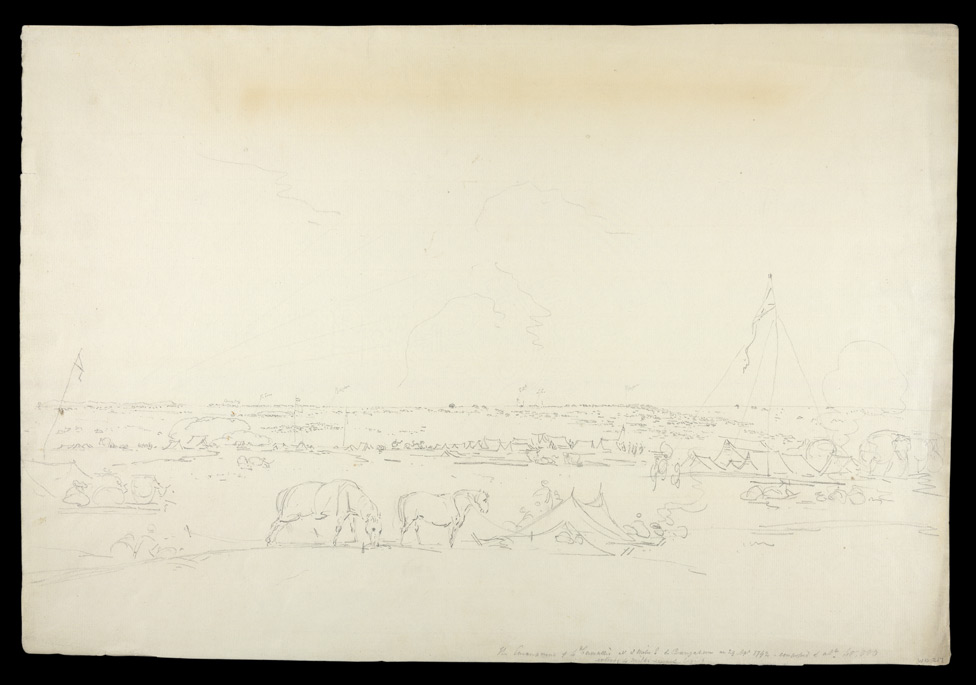
The Encampment of Ld. Cornwallis at 5 miles E of Bangalore on 29' 'Apl 1792. Composed of abt 40,000, extent 4 miles long

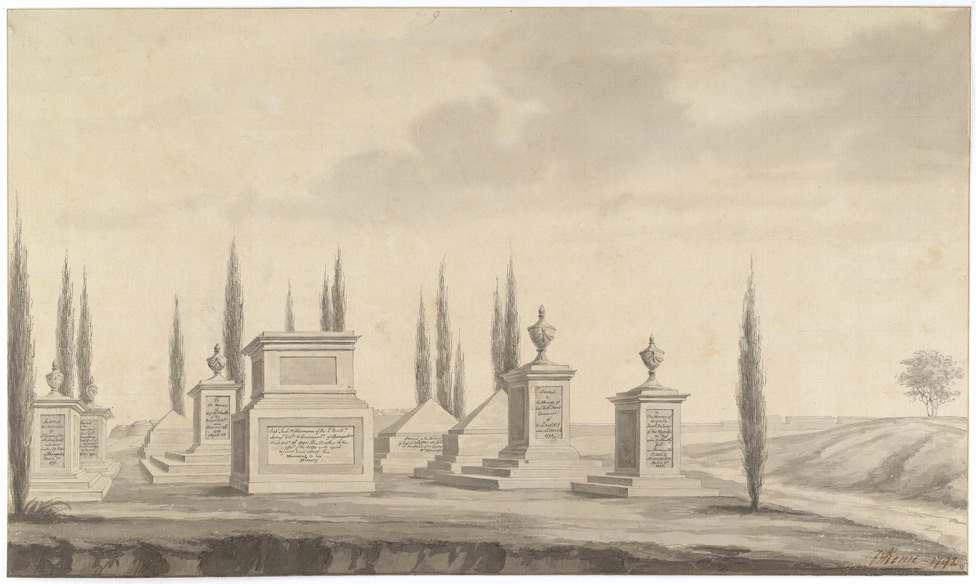
View of the burial ground at Bangalore, with Officers who fell in the Battle for Bangalore - Select Views in Mysore, the country of Tippoo Sultan by Robert Home (1752-1834)

=== Sketches of James Hunter ===
James Hunter served as a lieutenant in the Royal Artillery. He was a military painter, and his sketches portrayed aspects of military and everyday life. Hunter served the British India Army and took part in Tippu Sultan Campaigns.

Hunter has sketched different landscapes of South India, including Bangalore, Mysore, Hosur, Kancheepuram, Madras, Arcot, Sriperumbudur, etc. These paintings were published in 'A Brief history of ancient and modern India embellished with coloured engravings', published by Edward Orme, London between 1802–05, and 'Picturesque scenery in the Kingdom of Mysore' published by Edward Orme in 1804.

Hunter died in India in 1792. Some of his paintings of Bangalore Fort are below

Bangalore Fort

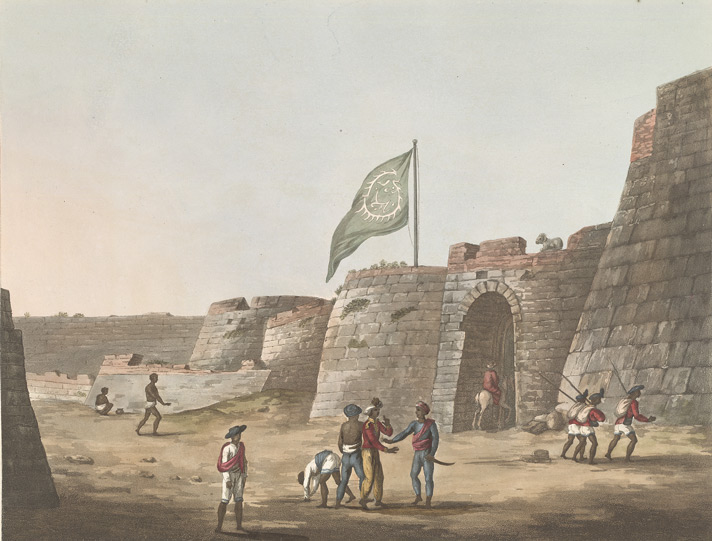
The North Entrance into The Fort of Bangalore [with Tipu's flag flying] by James Hunter (d.1792)

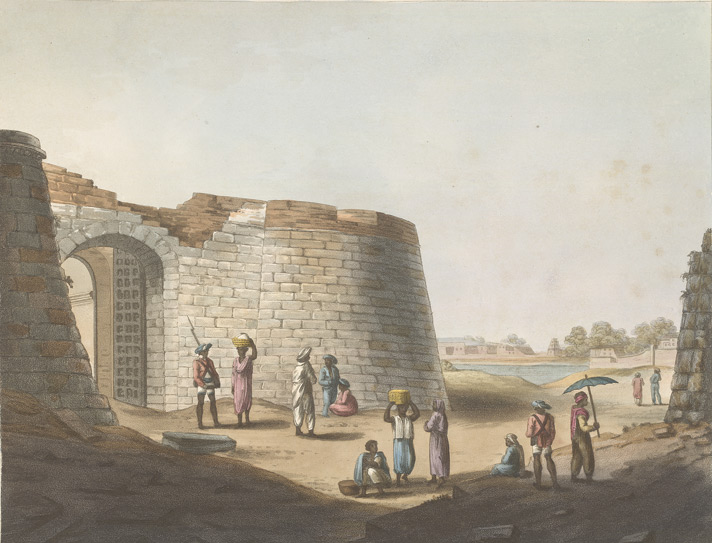
The South Entrance into The Fort of Bangalore by James Hunter (d.1792)

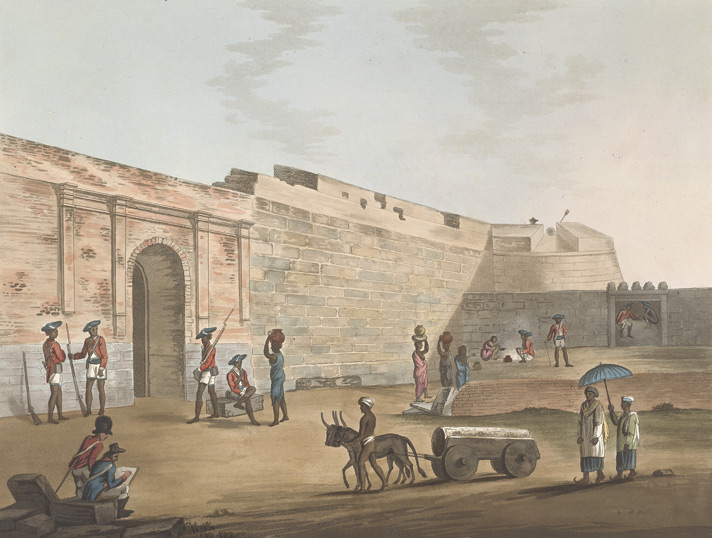
The Mysore Gate at Bangalore Fort by James Hunter (d.1792)

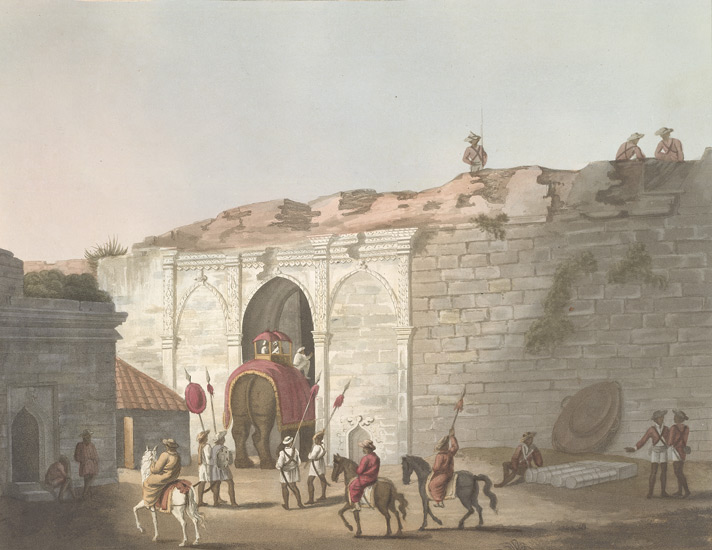
The Delhi Gate Of Bangalore by James Hunter (d.1792)

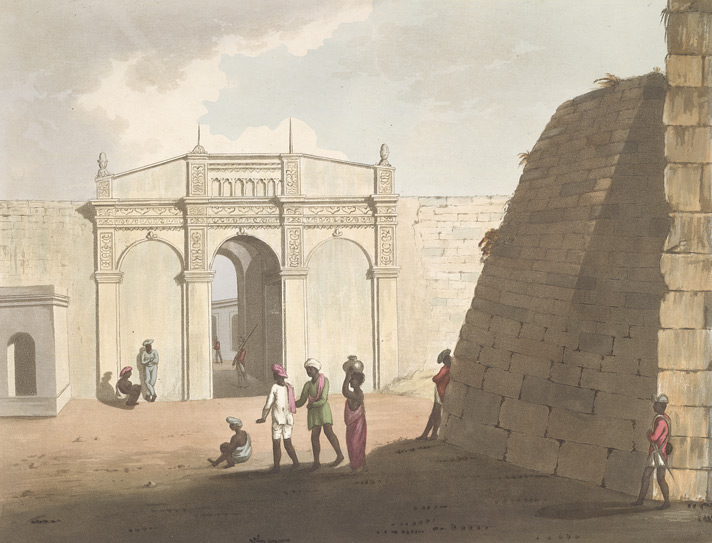
The Third Delhi Gate Of Bangalore by James Hunter (d.1792)
Tippu's Summer Palace in the Bangalore Fort

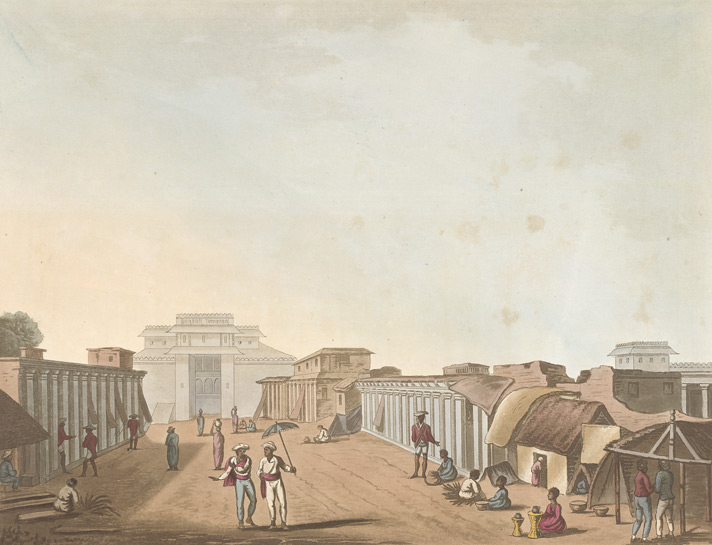
A Street Leading To The Palace Of Bangalore by James Hunter (d.1792) (the gateway in the end is on the right side of next 2 photos)

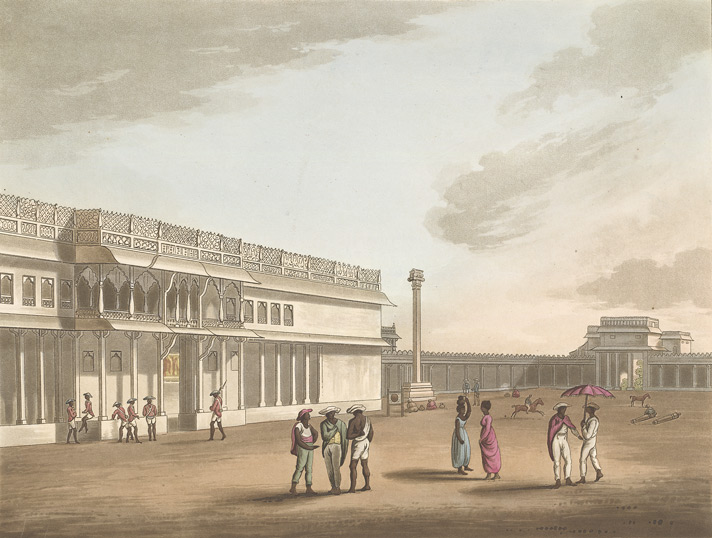
The Square And Entrance Into Tippoo's Palace, Bangalore, by James Hunter (d.1792)

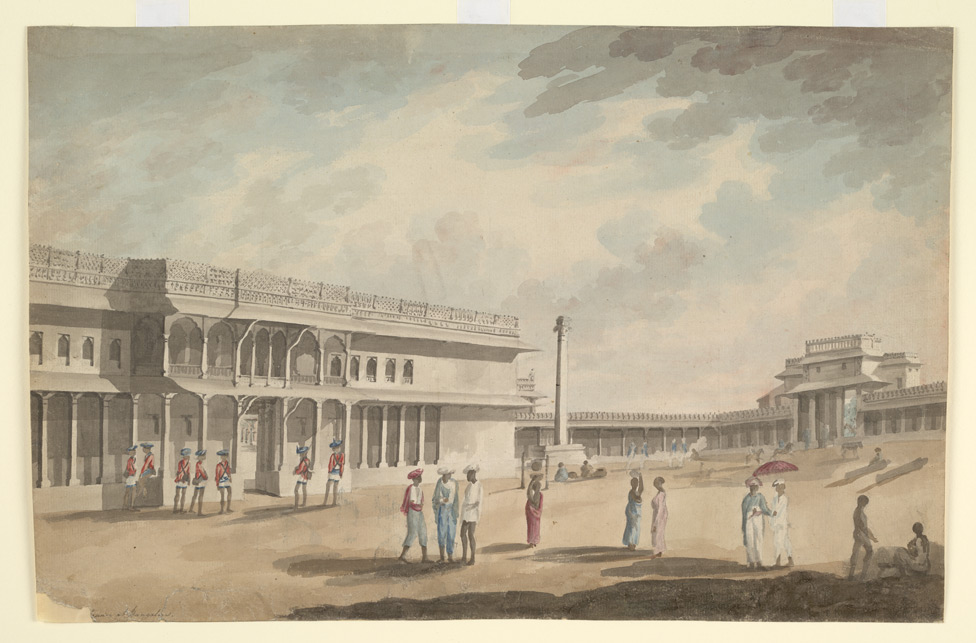
'Square at Bangalore' and 'The Entrance of Tippoo's Palace, Bangalore Feb 92, by James Hunter (d.1792)

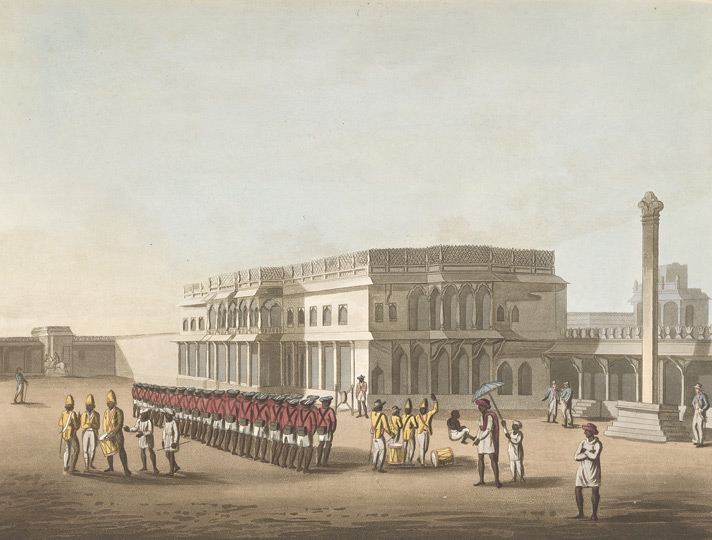
North Entrance Of Tippoo's Palace At Bangalore, by James Hunter (d.1792)

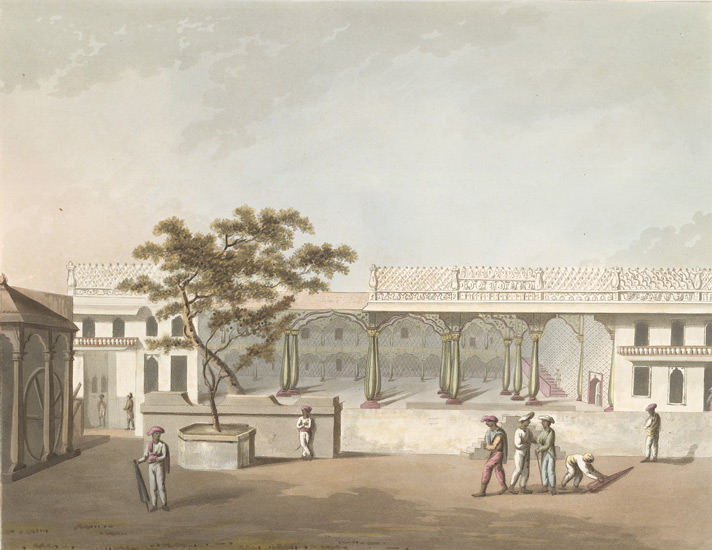
North Front Of Tippoo's Palace, Bangalore, by James Hunter (d.1792)

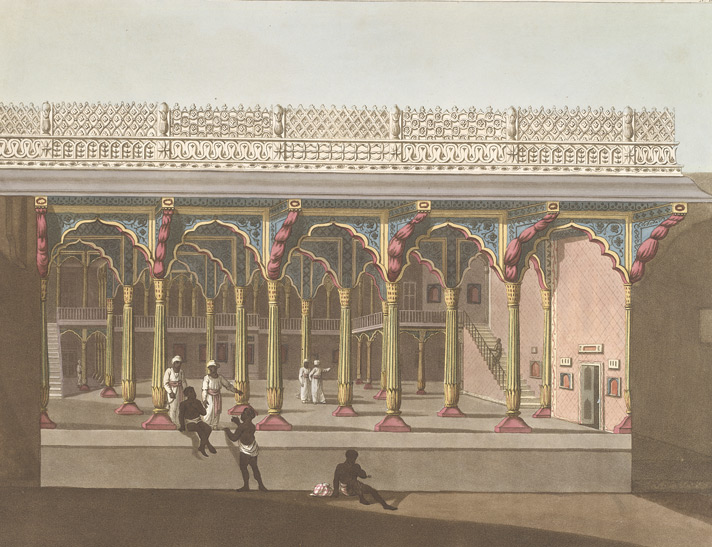
West Front Of Tippoo's Palace, Bangalore by James Hunter (d.1792)

=== Other British Sketches of Bangalore Fort ===
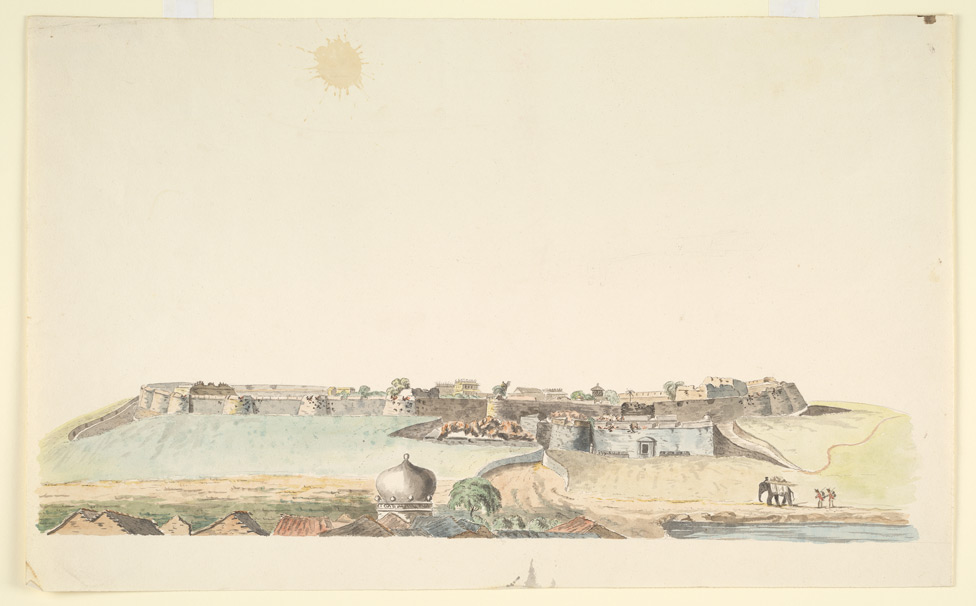
The fort of Bangalore, from a village outside the main gate, by an anonymous artist, c.1790 - 1792.

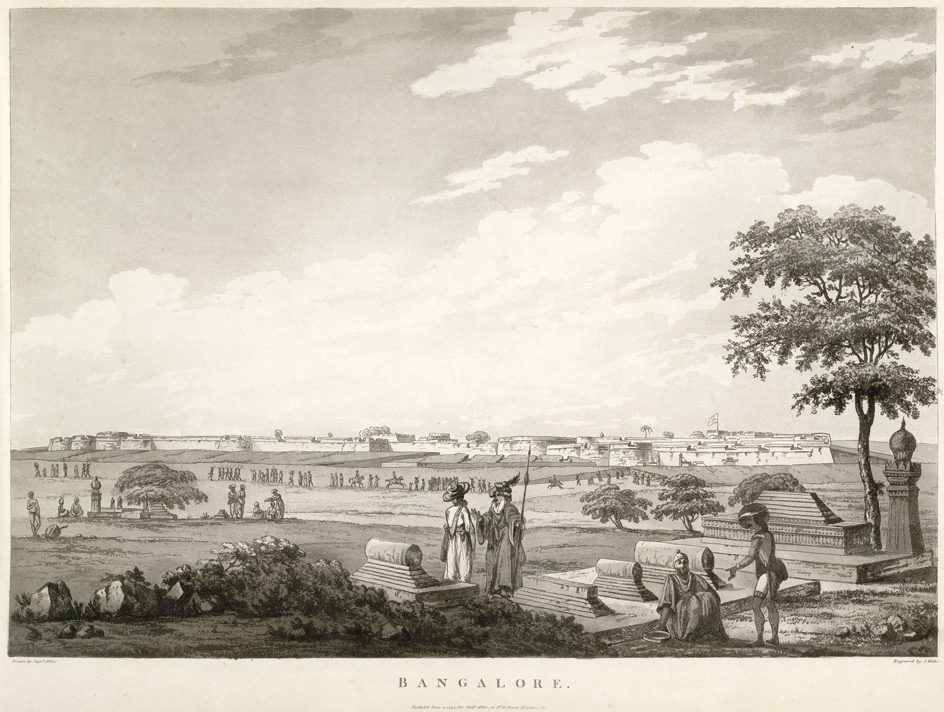
Muslim graves, around the Bangalore Fort (1974), from Alexander Allan's 'Views in the Mysore Country 1794'

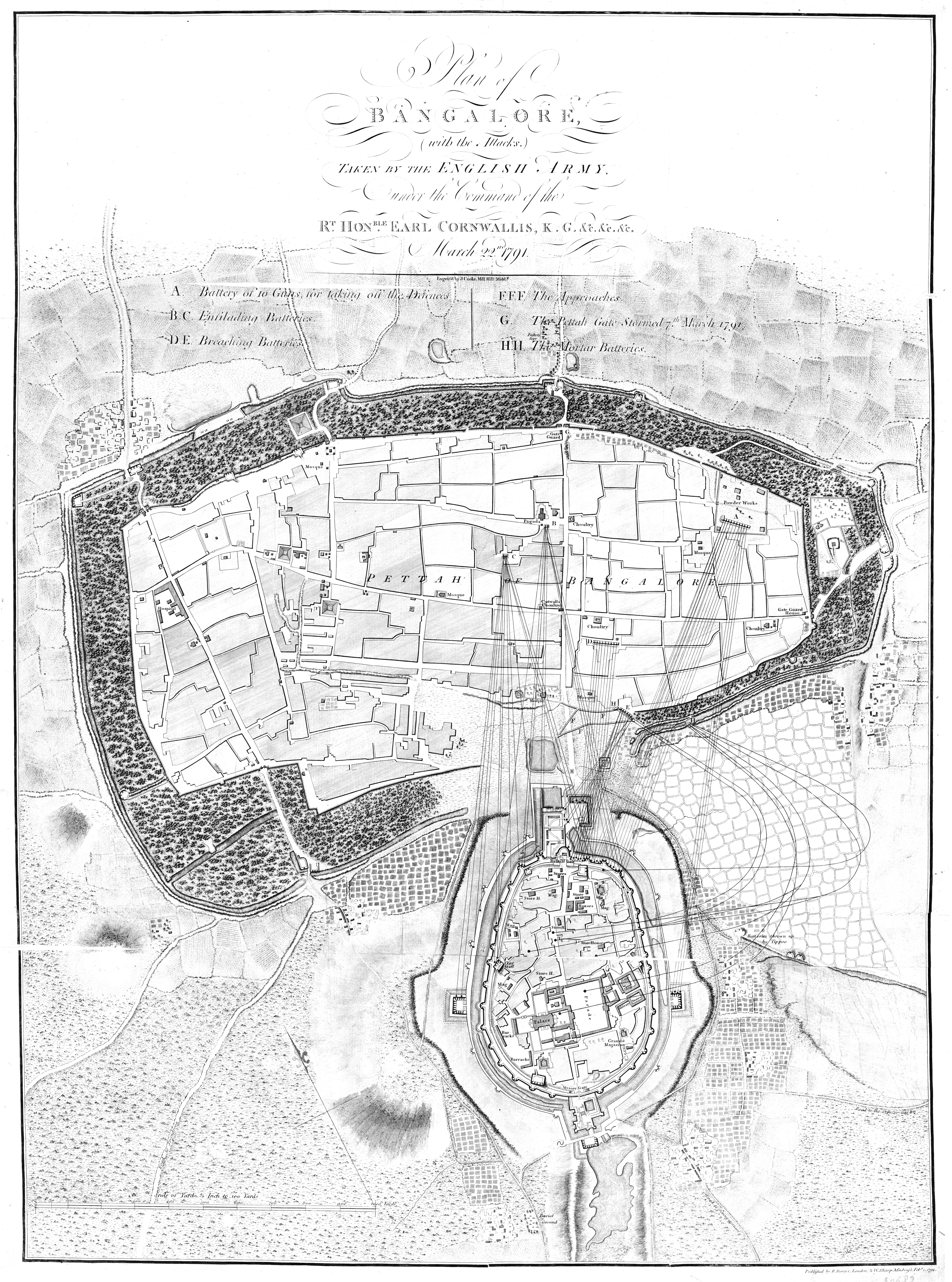
Plan of the Siege with positions of guns

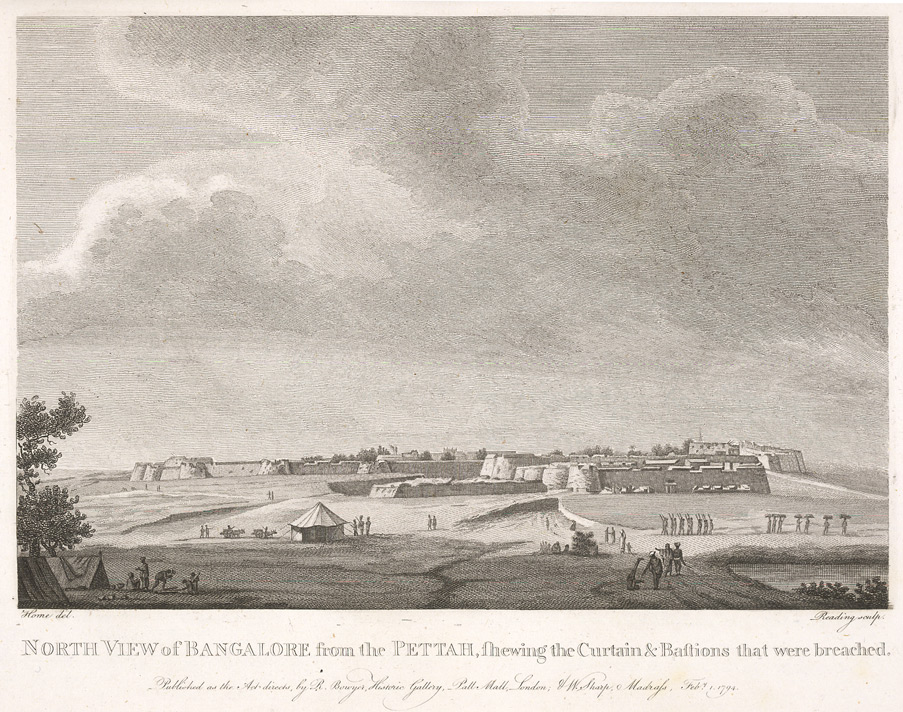
North view of Bangalore from the pettah, (View from the around the present Avenue Road, facing Fort) shewing the curtain and bastions that were breached, by Robert Home (1752-1834)

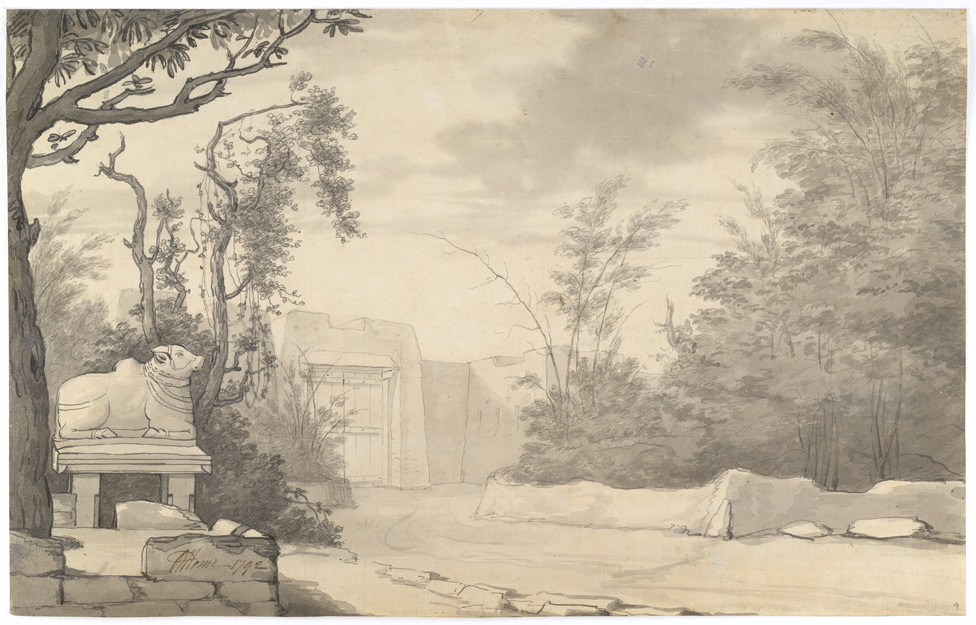
View of the Pettah Gateway where Colonel Morehouse (Moorehouse) fell (Robert Home, 1792)
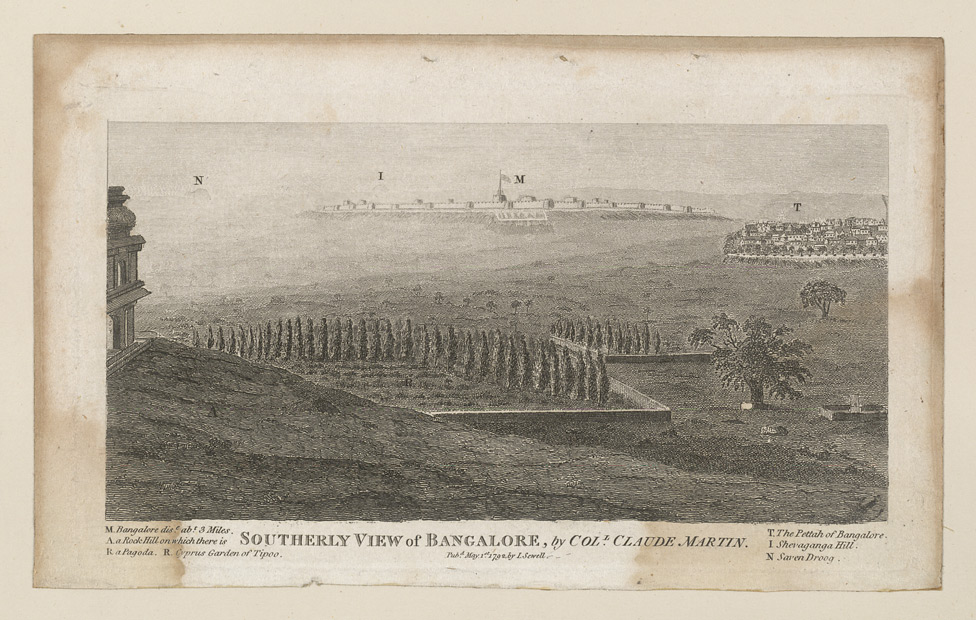
Bangalore Fort as seen from the Kempegowda Lalbagh Tower. Engraving by Claude Martin, from an earlier drawing of a southerly view of Bangalore in Karnataka, published by J. Sewell in 1792.

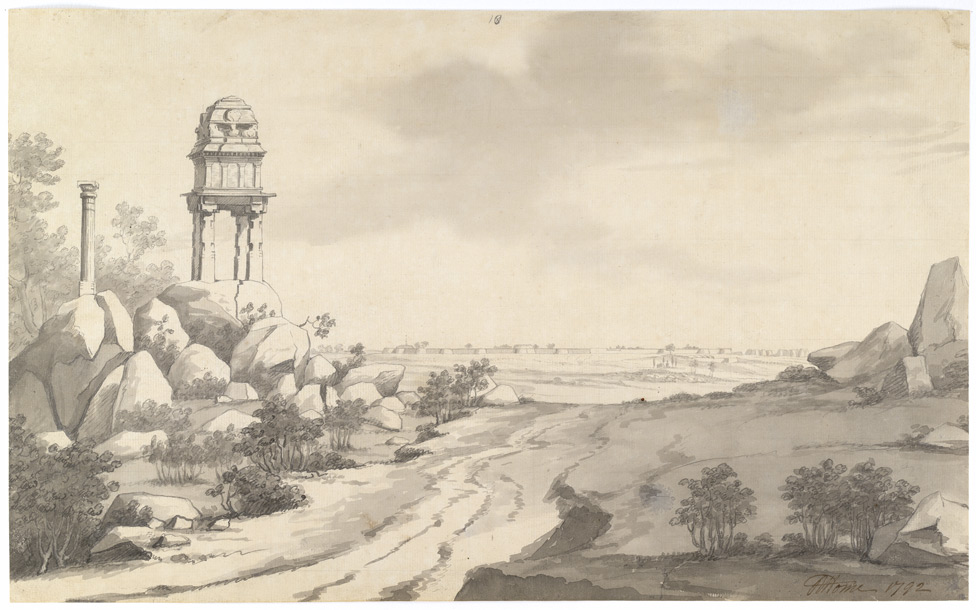
View of Bangalore Fort, from the Kempegowda South Tower. South view of Bangalore with the fortress in the distance by Robert Home (1752-1834) in 1792

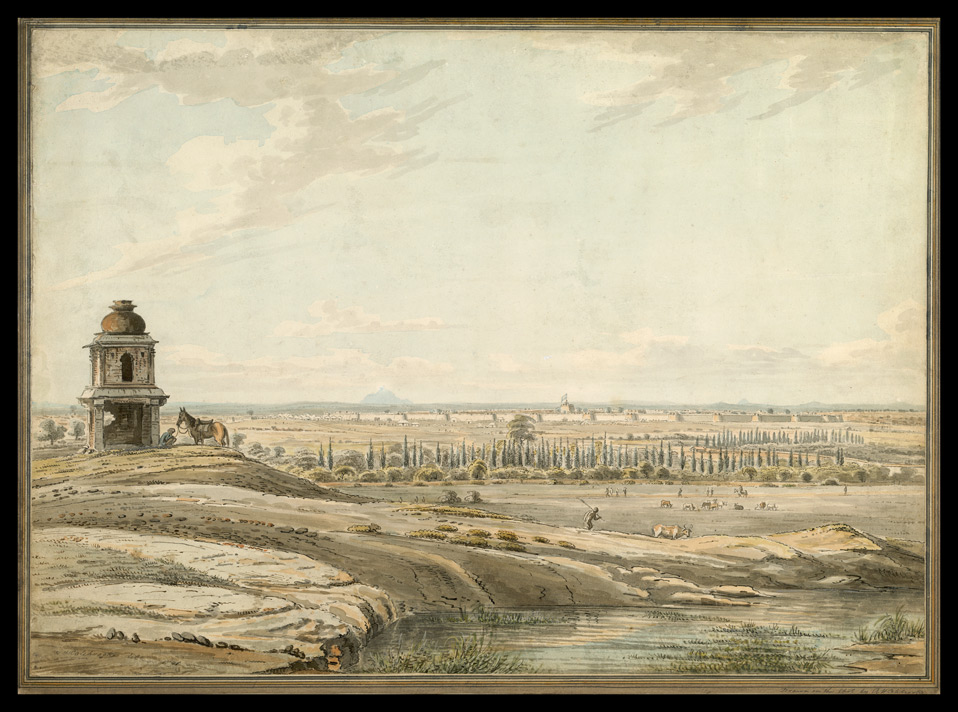
View of Bangalore Fort, from the East, with a small shrine and a dismounted horseman in the foreground, and cattle grazing beyond, by Robert Hyde Colebrooke (1762-1808) in 1791

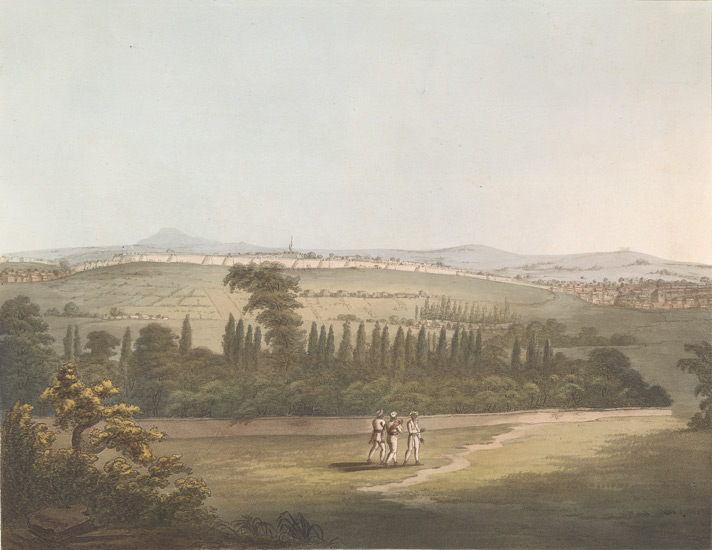
East view of Bangalore, with the cypress garden, from a pagoda, by James Hunter(d. 1792). Bangalore Fort as seen from the East (Cypress Gardens in today's Lalbagh)
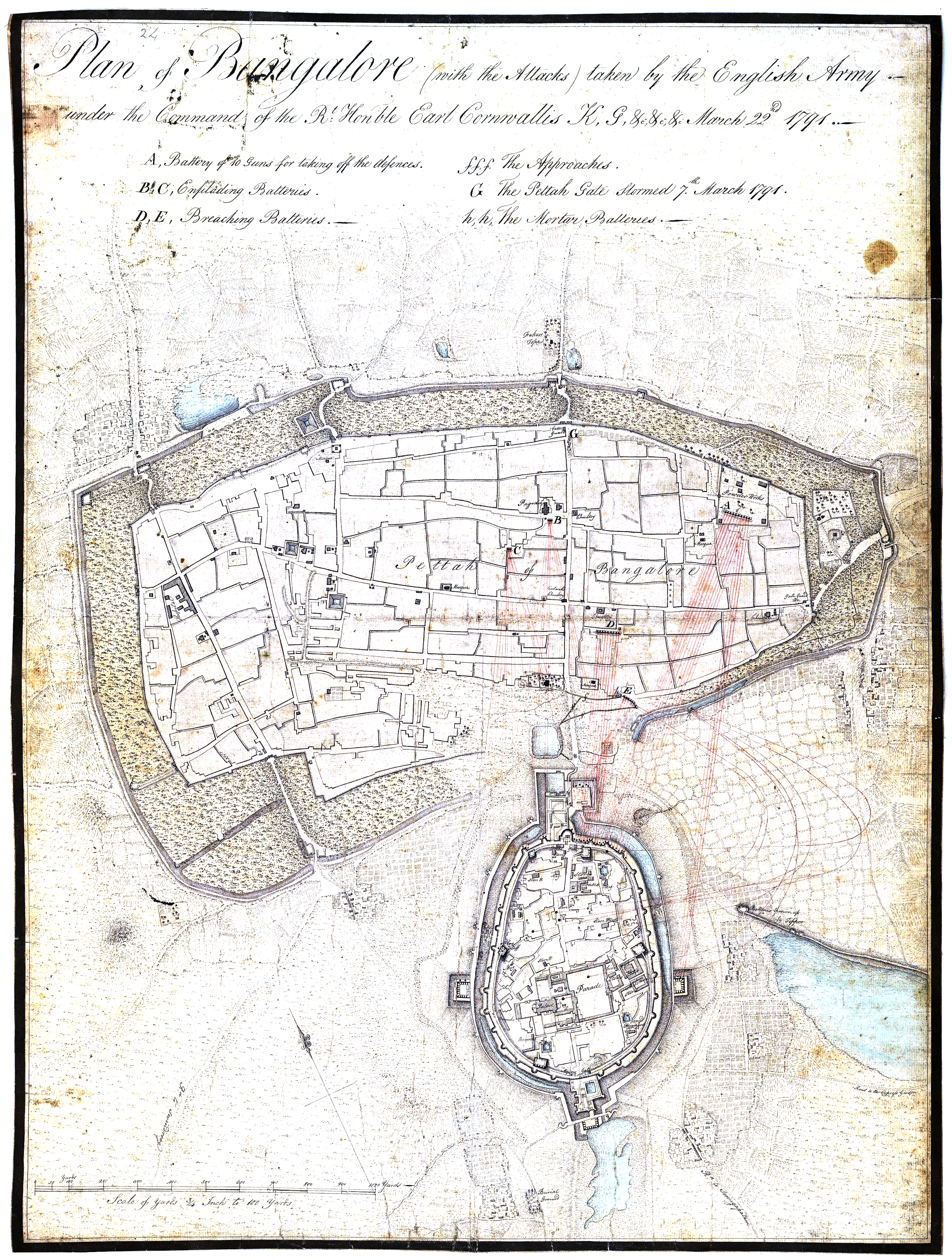
Ink wash of a plan of Bangalore by Robert Home (1752-1834) in 1791. Plan of Bangalore (with the Attacks) taken by the English Army under the Command of the Rt. Honble. Earl Cornwallis KG etc. March 22, 1791. Part of 22 drawings along with a map and three plans completed by Home, whilst accompanying the British army under Cornwallis during the 3rd Mysore War 1791-1792

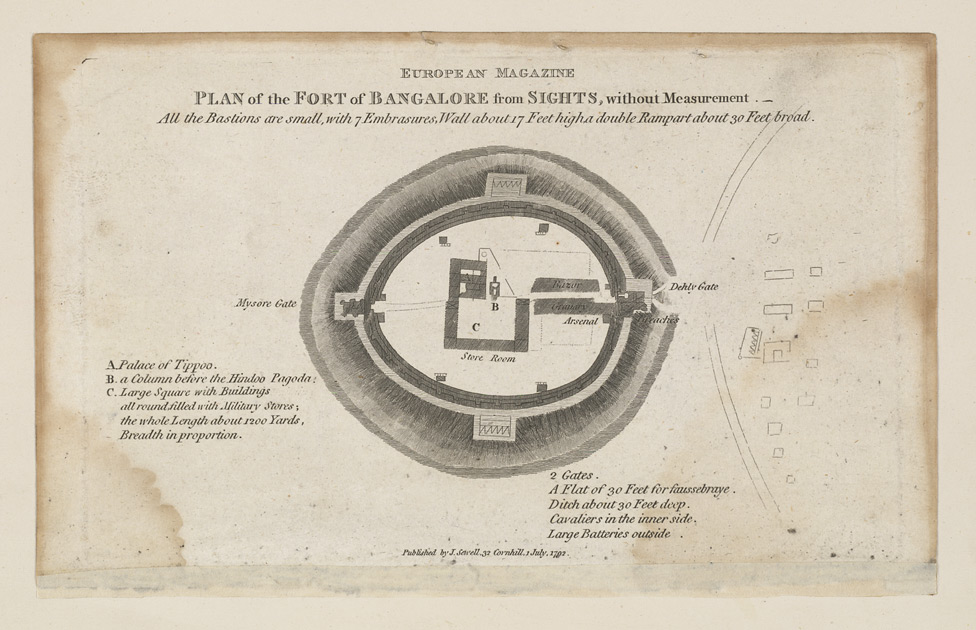
Plan of the Fort of Bangalore from sights, without measurement, by Claude Martin (1735-1800)

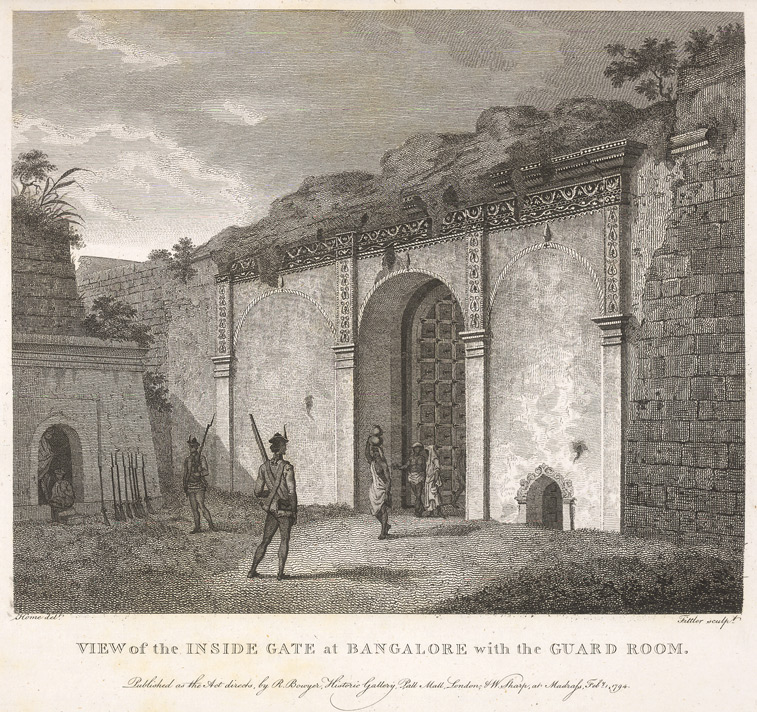
View of the inside gate at Bangalore with the guard room, by James Fittler (1758-1835) after sketches of Robert Home (1752-1834)
