= List of commanders of the British 6th Division =

6th Division 6th Infantry Division 6th (United Kingdom) Division
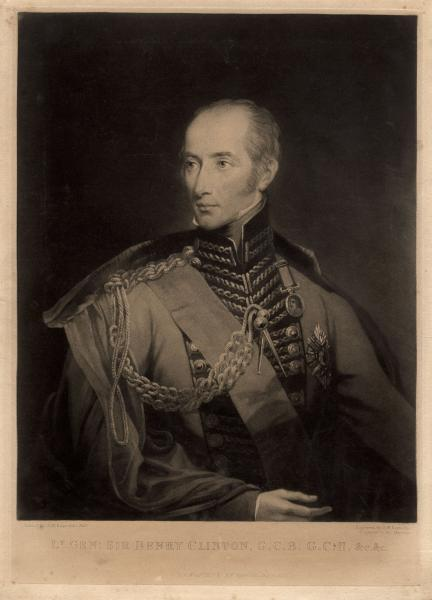
- Portrait of Henry Clinton, by Samuel William Reynolds, who led the division for the majority of the Peninsular War.
- Active: Raised and disbanded numerous times between 1810 and present
- Country: United Kingdom
- Branch: British Army
- Engagements: Napoleonic Wars; Second Boer War; First World War; Second World War

The 6th Division was an infantry division of the British Army and was first formed in 1810. The division was commanded by a general officer commanding (GOC). In this role, the GOC received orders from a level above him in the chain of command, and then used the forces within the division to undertake the mission assigned. In addition to directing the tactical battle in which the division was involved, the GOC oversaw a staff and the administrative, logistical, medical, training, and discipline of the division.

Prior to 1809, the British Army did not use divisional formations. As the British military grew in size during the Napoleonic Wars, the need arose for such an implementation in order to better organise forces for administrative, logistical, and tactical reasons. The 6th Division was formed in 1810 by Lieutenant-General Arthur Wellesley, and served in the Peninsular War (part of the Napoleonic Wars).

== General officer commanding ==
General officer commanding
No.	Appointment date	Rank	General officer commanding	Notes	Source(s)
1	6 October 1810	Major-General	Alexander Campbell	The division was formed in Portugal from locally based British and Portuguese troops	
2	9 February 1811	Lieutenant-General	Henry Clinton		
Temporary	5 November 1811	Major-General	Robert Burne	Commanded until 9 February 1812 when he was sent home as "[not] very fit to take charge of a large body".	
Temporary	26 January 1813	Major-General	Edward Pakenham		
2	25 June 1813	Lieutenant-General	Henry Clinton		
3	22 July 1813	Major-General	Denis Pack	Pack was wounded in action at the Battle of Sorauren on 28 July	
Acting	28 July 1813	Major-General	Edward Pakenham		
4	8 August 1813	Major-General	Charles Colville		
2	9 October 1813	Lieutenant-General	Henry Clinton	At the conclusion of the Peninsular War, in 1814, the division was disbanded in France. The final troops departed in June.	
5	11 April 1815	Lieutenant-General	Sir Galbraith Cole	On 11 April 1815, the division was reformed in Southern Netherlands.	
Acting	18 June 1815	Major-General	Sir John Lambert	Lambert assumed temporary command while Cole was on his honeymoon. He commanded the division at the Battle of Waterloo.	
5	7 July 1815	Lieutenant-General	Sir Galbraith Cole	Cole resumed command around 7 July. Following the conclusion of the Napoleonic Wars, the British military in France was reorganised into three divisions. The remaining forces, including the 6th Division, were stood down.	
6	14 December 1899	Lieutenant-General	Thomas Kelly-Kenny	The division was mobilized in the United Kingdom for service in the Second Boer War. Kelly-Kenny maintained command through to the end of 1900 when, while still in southern Africa, the division was broken-up.	
7	2 March 1904	Major-General	Arthur Wynne	The division was reformed in England	
8	21 November 1906	Major-General	Theodore Stephenson	On 12 May 1907, Stephenson relinquished command of the division. The division was then reorganised as the 4th Division.	
9	May 1907	Major-General	Lawrence Parsons	The 8th Division, based in Ireland, was reorganised as the 6th Division	
10	1 October 1909	Major-General	Charles Metcalfe		
11	16 July 1910	Major-General	William Pulteney		
12	27 July 1914	Major-General	John Keir	Under Keir, the division was mobilised for service in the First World War. The division moved to France in September 1914, and served on the Western Front for the entirely of the war.	
13	27 May 1915	Major-General	Walter Congreve		
14	14 November 1915	Major-General	Charles Ross		
15	21 August 1917	Major-General	Thomas Marden	The division entered Germany following the end of the war, in November 1918. The division started to demobilize and ceased to exist by March 1919.	
16	8 November 1919	Major-General	Peter Strickland	The division was reformed in Ireland, and took part in the Irish War of Independence. Following the conclusion of the war, there was no room for the division to be based in Northern Ireland and it was disbanded by 1923.	
17	3 November 1939	Major-General	Richard O'Connor	The division was reformed in Egypt, following the outbreak of the Second World War, when the 7th Infantry Division was redesignated. On 17 June 1940, the division was redesignated as headquarters Western Desert Force.	
18	17 June 1940	Major-General	John Evetts	The division was reformed in Egypt on this date.	
Acting	7 April 1941	Brigadier	Cyril Lomax		
18	19 April 1941	Major-General	John Evetts		
Acting	29 September 1941	Brigadier	Noel Martin	During this period, the division was transferred into besieged port of Tobruk and was redesignated as the 70th Infantry Division on 10 October 1941.	
19	1 February 2008	Major General	Jacko Page	The division was reformed for the War in Afghanistan	
20	23 January 2009	Major General	Nick Carter	The division was disbanded in 2011	
21	1 August 2019	Major General	James Bowder	The division was reformed by the redesignation of Force Troops Command	
22	1 September 2021	Major General	Gerald Strickland		
23	31 July 2023	Major General	Daniel Reeve		
