= List of orders of battle for the British 6th Division =

Order of battle for the British 6th Division

6th Division; 6th Infantry Division
- Active: Raised and disbanded numerous times since 1809
- Country: United Kingdom
- Branch: British Army
- Engagements: Napoleonic Wars; Second Boer War; First World War; Second World War

An order of battle is a list of the various elements of a military formation organised within a hierarchical command structure. It can provide information on the strength of that formation and the equipment used. An order of battle is not necessarily a set structure, and it can change depending on tactical or strategic developments, or the evolution of military doctrine. For example, a division could be altered radically from one campaign to another through the adding or removing of subunits but retain its identity and prior history. The size of a division can vary dramatically as a result of what forces are assigned and the doctrine employed at that time.

The 6th Division is an active division of the British Army, which was first formed in October 1810. It has since been raised and disbanded numerous times numerous times from then through to present.

== Napoleonic Wars ==
During the Napoleonic Wars (1803–1815), the British Army grew in size. On 18 June 1809, Lieutenant-General Arthur Wellesley, commander of the British forces in Spain and Portugal, ordered the creation of the army's first four divisions. This was followed by the creation of the 6th Division the following year, on 6 October 1810.

=== On formation (October 1810) ===
During this period, brigades were referred to by their commander's names. Due to changes in command, the brigade names fluctuated frequently.

6th Division

The division's first brigade:

- 1st Battalion, 11th (North Devonshire) Regiment of Foot
- 2nd Battalion, 53rd (Shropshire) Regiment of Foot
- 1st Battalion, 61st (South Gloucestershire) Regiment of Foot
- One company from the 5th Battalion, 60th (Royal American) Regiment

Portuguese brigade:

- 8th Portuguese Line Regiment
- Loyal Lusitanian Legion

=== Battle of Fuentes de Onoro (May 1811) ===
During this period, brigades were referred to by their commander's names. Due to changes in command, the brigade names fluctuated frequently.

6th Division

The division's first brigade:

- 1st Battalion, 11th (North Devonshire) Regiment of Foot
- 2nd Battalion, 53rd (Shropshire) Regiment of Foot
- 1st Battalion, 61st (South Gloucestershire) Regiment of Foot
- One company from the 5th Battalion, 60th (Royal American) Regiment

The division's second brigade:

- 2nd Regiment of Foot
- 1st Battalion, 36th (Herefordshire) Regiment of Foot

Portuguese Brigade

- 8th Portuguese Line Regiment (two battalions)
- 12th Portuguese Line Regiment (two battalions)

=== Battle of Salamanca (July 1812) ===
During this period, brigades were referred to by their commander's names. Due to changes in command, the brigade names fluctuated frequently.

6th Division

The division's first brigade:

- 1st Battalion, 11th (North Devonshire) Regiment of Foot
- 2nd Battalion, 53rd (Shropshire) Regiment of Foot
- 1st Battalion, 61st (South Gloucestershire) Regiment of Foot
- One company from the 5th Battalion, 60th (Royal American) Regiment

The division's second brigade:

- 2nd Regiment of Foot
- 1st Battalion, 32nd (Cornwall) Regiment of Foot
- 1st Battalion, 36th (Herefordshire) Regiment of Foot

Portuguese Brigade

- 8th Portuguese Line Regiment
- 12th Portuguese Line Regiment
- 9th Caçadores

=== 1813 campaign, including the Battle of Sorauren ===
During this period, brigades were referred to by their commander's names. Due to changes in command, the brigade names fluctuated frequently.

6th Division

The division's first brigade:

- 1st Battalion, 42nd (Highland) Regiment of Foot
- 1st Battalion, 79th Regiment of Foot (Cameron Highlanders)
- 1st Battalion, 91st (Argyllshire Highlanders) Regiment of Foot
- One company from the 5th Battalion, 60th (Royal American) Regiment

The division's second brigade:

- 1st Battalion, 11th (North Devonshire) Regiment of Foot
- 1st Battalion, 32nd (Cornwall) Regiment of Foot
- 1st Battalion, 36th (Herefordshire) Regiment of Foot
- 1st Battalion, 61st (South Gloucestershire) Regiment of Foot

Portuguese Brigade

- 8th Portuguese Line Regiment
- 12th Portuguese Line Regiment
- 9th Caçadores

=== 1814 campaign, including the Battle of Toulouse ===
During this period, brigades were referred to by their commander's names. Due to changes in command, the brigade names fluctuated frequently.

6th Division

The division's first brigade:

- 1st Battalion, 42nd (Highland) Regiment of Foot
- 1st Battalion, 79th Regiment of Foot (Cameron Highlanders)
- 1st Battalion, 91st (Argyllshire Highlanders) Regiment of Foot

The division's second brigade:

- 1st Battalion, 11th (North Devonshire) Regiment of Foot
- 1st Battalion, 36th (Herefordshire) Regiment of Foot
- 1st Battalion, 61st (South Gloucestershire) Regiment of Foot

Portuguese Brigade

- 8th Portuguese Line Regiment
- 12th Portuguese Line Regiment
- 9th Caçadores

=== Waterloo campaign (1815) ===
6th Division

British Tenth Brigade

- 1st Battalion, 4th (King's Own) Regiment of Foot
- 1st Battalion, 27th (Inniskilling) Regiment of Foot
- 1st Battalion, 40th (the 2nd Somersetshire) Regiment of Foot
- 2nd Battalion, 81st Regiment of Foot (Loyal Lincoln Volunteers)

Fourth Hanoverian Brigade

- Landwehr Battalion Verden
- Landwehr Battalion Lüneburg
- Landwehr Battalion Osterode
- Landwehr Battalion Münden
- Captain Rettberg's Foot Battery

Divisional troops

- Major Unett's British Foot Battery
- Captain Sinclair's British Foot Battery

== Second Boer War ==
=== On mobilisation in December 1899 ===
6th Infantry Division

12th Infantry Brigade

- 2nd Battalion, Bedfordshire Regiment
- 1st Battalion, Royal Irish Regiment
- 2nd Battalion, Worcestershire Regiment
- 2nd Battalion, Wiltshire Regiment

13th Infantry Brigade

- 2nd Battalion, Buffs (Royal East Kent Regiment)
- 2nd Battalion, Gloucestershire Regiment
- 1st battalion, Duke of Wellington's Regiment
- 1st Battalion, Oxfordshire Light Infantry

Divisional troops

- Divisional artillery, Royal Field Artillery
  - 76th Battery
  - 81st Battery
  - 82nd Battery
  - Ammunition column
- Divisional engineers, Royal Engineers
- No. 7, 10, and 23 Companies, Army Service Corps
- Royal Army Medical Corps

=== February 1900 ===
6th Infantry Division

13th Infantry Brigade

- 2nd Battalion, Buffs (Royal East Kent Regiment)
- 2nd Battalion, Gloucestershire Regiment
- 1st battalion, Duke of Wellington's Regiment
- 1st Battalion, Oxfordshire Light Infantry

18th Infantry Brigade

- 1st Battalion, The Princess of Wales's Own (Yorkshire Regiment)
- 1st Battalion, Welsh Regiment
- 1st Battalion, Essex Regiment

1st Mounted Infantry Brigade (attached)

- 1st Mounted Infantry Regiment
- 3rd Mounted Infantry Regiment
- 5th Mounted Infantry Regiment
- 7th Mounted Infantry Regiment
- New South Wales Mounted Rifles
- Roberts' Horse
- Kitchener's Horse
- Grahamstown Volunteers Mounted Infantry

Divisional troops

- Divisional artillery, Royal Field Artillery
  - 76th Battery
  - 81st Battery
  - Ammunition column
- 38th Company, Royal Engineers

== First World War ==
On 28 July 1914, the First World War began. On 4 August, Germany invaded Belgium and the United Kingdom entered the war against the German Empire.

The war establishment (on-paper strength), of an infantry division in 1914 was 18,179 men, 5,594 horses, 18 motor vehicles, 76 pieces of artillery, and 24 machine guns. While there was a small alteration to the number of men and horses were supposed to be in a division in 1915, the main change was the decrease in artillery pieces to 48 and an increase in motor vehicles to 54. The establishment in 1916 increased the division size to 19,372 men, 5,145 horses, 61 motor vehicles, 64 artillery pieces, 40 trench mortars, and 200 machine guns. The 1917 changes saw a decrease to 18,825 men, 4,342 horses, 57 motor vehicles, and 48 artillery pieces, although the number of trench mortars remained the same, and the number of machine guns increased to 264. By 1918, the number of front line infantry within the British Army in France had decreased because of casualties and a lack of eligible replacements, and this led to a manpower crisis. To consolidate manpower and to increase the ratio of machine guns and artillery support available to the infantry, the number of battalions in a division was reduced from twelve to nine. This resulted in the 1918 establishment of 16,035 men, 3,838 horses, 79 motor vehicles, 48 artillery pieces, 36 trench mortars, and 400 machine guns.

=== 9 September 1914 ===
6th Division

- 16th Infantry Brigade (Brigadier-General E. C. Ingouville-Williams)
  - 1st The Buffs (East Kent Regiment)
  - 1st The Leicestershire Regiment
  - 1st The King's (Shropshire Light Infantry)
  - 2nd The York and Lancaster Regiment
- 17th Infantry Brigade (Brigadier-General W. R. B. Doran)
  - 1st The Royal Fusiliers (City of London Regiment)
  - 1st The Prince of Wales's (North Staffordshire Regiment)
  - 2nd The Prince of Wales's Leinster Regiment (Royal Canadians)
  - 3rd The Rifle Brigade (The Prince Consort's Own)
- 18th Infantry Brigade (Brigadier-General W. N. Congreve)
  - 1st The Prince of Wales's Own (West Yorkshire Regiment)
  - 1st The East Yorkshire Regiment
  - 2nd The Sherwood Foresters (Nottinghamshire and Derbyshire Regiment)
  - 2nd The Durham Light Infantry
- Divisional Troops
  - Mounted Troops
    - C Squadron, 19th (Queen Alexandra's Own Royal) Hussars
    - 6th Cyclist Company
  - Artillery
    - II Brigade, RFA
      - 21st Battery, RFA
      - 42nd Battery, RFA
      - 53rd Battery, RFA
    - XXIV Brigade, RFA
      - 110th Battery, RFA
      - 111th Battery, RFA
      - 112th Battery, RFA
    - XXXVIII Brigade, RFA
      - 24th Battery, RFA
      - 34th Battery, RFA
      - 72nd Battery, RFA
    - XII (Howitzer) Brigade, RFA
      - 43rd (Howitzer) Battery, RFA
      - 86th (Howitzer) Battery, RFA
      - 87th (Howitzer) Battery, RFA
    - 24th Heavy Battery, RGA
  - Engineers
    - 12th Field Company, RE
    - 38th Field Company, RE

=== Later in the War ===
6th Division

16th Infantry Brigade

- 1st Battalion, Buffs (East Kent) Regiment
- 1st Battalion, King's (Shropshire Light Infantry)
- 2nd Battalion, York and Lancaster Regiment
- 8th (Service) Battalion, Bedfordshire and Hertfordshire Regiment (from 71st Bde. November 1915, disbanded February 1918)
- 1st Battalion, Leicestershire Regiment (to 71st Bde. November 1915)
- 1/5th Battalion, Loyal North Lancashire Regiment (from February 1915 to June 1915)

17th Infantry Brigade (until 14 October 1915)

- 1st Battalion, Royal Fusiliers
- 1st Battalion, Prince of Wales's (North Staffordshire Regiment)
- 2nd Battalion, Prince of Wales's Leinster Regiment (Royal Canadians)
- 3rd Battalion, Rifle Brigade (Prince Consort's Own)
- 1/2nd (City of London) Battalion, London Regiment (Royal Fusiliers) (from February 1915)

The brigade transferred to the 24th Division in October 1915, swapping with the 71st Brigade.

18th Infantry Brigade

- 1st Battalion, West Yorkshire Regiment
- 1st Battalion, East Yorkshire Regiment (until November 1915)
- 2nd Battalion, Durham Light Infantry
- 11th (Service) Battalion, Essex Regiment (from 71st Bde. October 1915)
- 2nd Battalion, Sherwood Foresters (to 71st Bde. October 1915)
- 14th (Service) Battalion, Durham Light Infantry (from November 1915, disbanded February 1918)
- 1/16th (County of London) Battalion, London Regiment (Queen's Westminsters)(until February 1916)

19th Infantry Brigade (until 31 May 1915)

- 2nd Battalion, Royal Welsh Fusiliers
- 1st Battalion, Cameronians (Scottish Rifles)
- 1/5th Battalion, Cameronians (Scottish Rifles)
- 1st Battalion, Middlesex Regiment
- 2nd Battalion, Argyll and Sutherland Highlanders

Originally an independent brigade before being attached to the division, the 19th Brigade moved to the 27th Division in May, 1915 and was not replaced, reducing the division to the standard three infantry brigades.

71st Infantry Brigade (from 11 October 1915)

- 9th (Service) Battalion, Norfolk Regiment
- 9th (Service) Battalion, Suffolk Regiment (disbanded February 1918)
- 8th (Service) Battalion, Bedfordshire Regiment (to 16th Bde. November 1915)
- 11th (Service) Battalion, Essex Regiment (to 18th Bde. October 1915)
- 1st Battalion, Leicestershire Regiment (from 16th Bde. November 1915)
- 2nd Battalion, Sherwood Foresters (from 18th Bde. October 1915)

The brigade joined from the 24th Division in October 1915, swapping with the 17th Brigade.

Royal Field Artillery

- II Brigade, RFA
- XXIV Brigade, RFA

Royal Engineers

- 12th Field Company RE
- 509th (1st London) Field Company RE
- 459th (2/2nd West Riding) Field Company RE

== Second World War ==
In 1939, following the German invasion of Poland, the United Kingdom declared war in support of the latter and entered the Second World War.

The war establishment of the infantry division in 1939 was 13,863 men, 2,993 vehicles, 72 artillery pieces, 48 anti-tank guns, 361 anti-tank rifles, 126 mortars, and 700 machine guns. In 1941, it was changed to 17,298 men, 4,166 vehicles, 72 artillery pieces, 48 anti-tanks guns, 444 anti-tank rifles, 48 anti-aircraft guns, 218 mortars, and 867 machine guns. From 1944, the establishment was updated to 18,347 men, 4,330 vehicles, 72 artillery pieces, 110 anti-tank guns, 436 other anti-tank weapons, 359 mortars, and 1,302 machine guns.

=== Second World War (1939–1941) ===
6th Infantry Division

- Royal Scots Greys (2nd Dragoons) 25 Mar – 30 May 40

Artillery

- 60th (North Midland) Field Regiment, Royal Artillery 20 Jul – 30 Sep 41

Engineers

- 2nd Field Company, Royal Engineers 19 Feb – 30 Apr 41 & 29 Jun – 9 Oct 41
- 12th Field Company, Royal Engineers 20 May – 7 Jun 40, 5 Mar – 6 Apr 41 & 15 Jun – 9 Oct 41
- 54th Field Company, Royal Engineers 6 Mar – 7 Apr 41 & 11 Aug – 9 Oct 41
- 219th Field Park Company, Royal Engineers 29 Jul – 9 Oct 41
- 6th Divisional Signals Regiment, Royal Corps of Signals 3 Nov 39 – 7 Jun 40 & 1 Mar 41 – 9 Oct 41

22nd Infantry Brigade

6 Division 3 Nov 39 – 11 Mar 40 & 10 – 17 Jun 40

- 2nd Battalion, Scots Guards
- 1st Battalion, Queen's Own Royal West Kent Regiment
- 1st Battalion, Welch Regiment
- 2nd Battalion, Highland Light Infantry

22nd Guards Brigade

6 Division 17 Feb – 6 Apr 41

- 2nd Battalion, Scots Guards
- 3rd Battalion, Coldstream Guards
- 1st Battalion, Durham Light Infantry

14th Infantry Brigade

6 Division 29 Mar – 30 May 40 & 10 Jul – 9 Oct 41

- 2nd Battalion, York and Lancaster Regiment
- 2nd Battalion, Black Watch (Royal Highland Regiment)
- 2nd Battalion, Kings Own Royal Regiment (Lancaster)
- 1st Battalion, South Staffordshire Regiment
- 14th Infantry Brigade Anti Tank Company

16th Infantry Brigade

6 Division 23 Mar – 7 Jun 40

- 2nd Battalion, Queen's Royal Regiment (West Surrey)
- 2nd Battalion, Leicestershire Regiment
- 1st Battalion, Argyll and Sutherland Highlanders
- 16th Infantry Brigade Anti Tank Company

23rd Infantry Brigade

6 Division 29 Jun – 9 Oct 41

- 2nd Battalion, Black Watch
- 4th Battalion, Border Regiment
- Czechoslovak 11th Infantry Battalion
- 23rd Infantry Brigade Anti-Tank Company

== See also ==
- Operation Telic order of battle
