= Battle of Fuentes de Oñoro order of battle =

This is the order of battle for the Battle of Fuentes de Oñoro, which took place on 3–6 May 1811.

== French Army of Portugal ==
Commander-in-Chief: Marshal André Masséna

Army total: 48,198 (42,206 infantry, 4,662 cavalry, 46 guns)

=== II Corps ===
GD Jean Reynier

Division	Brigade	Regiments and Others
1st Division GD Pierre Hugues Victoire Merle (4,891 total)	1st Brigade GB Jacques Thomas Sarrut	2e Légère (3 bns); 36e Légère (3 bns)
1st Division GD Pierre Hugues Victoire Merle (4,891 total)	Unbrigaded	4e Légère (3 bns)
2nd Division GD Étienne Heudelet de Bierre (5,491 total)	1st Brigade GB Roche Godard	17e Légère (3 bns); 70e Ligne (3 bns)
2nd Division GD Étienne Heudelet de Bierre (5,491 total)	2nd Brigade GB Jean Arnaud	31e Légère (3 bns); 47e Ligne (3 bns)
	Cavalry Brigade GB Pierre Benoît Soult (682 total)	1e Hussards; 22e Chasseurs à Cheval; 8e Dragons
Corps total: 11,064 (10,382 infantry, 682 cavalry)

=== VI Corps ===
GD Louis Henri Loison

Division	Brigade	Regiments and Others
1st Division GD Jean Gabriel Marchand (5,872 total)	1st Brigade GB Antoine de Maucune	6e Légère (3 bns); 69e Ligne (3 bns)
1st Division GD Jean Gabriel Marchand (5,872 total)	2nd Brigade GB Cheminau	39e Ligne (3 bns); 76e Ligne (3 bns)
2nd Division GD Julien Augustin Joseph Mermet (6,702 total)	1st Brigade GB Ménard	25e Légère (3 bns); 27e Ligne (3 bns)
2nd Division GD Julien Augustin Joseph Mermet (6,702 total)	2nd Brigade GB Eloi Charlemagne Taupin	50e Ligne (3 bns); 59e Ligne (3 bns)
3rd Division GD Claude François Ferey (4,232 total)	1st Brigade GB Simon	26e Ligne (3 bns); Légion du Midi (1 bn); Légion Hannoverienne (1 bn)
3rd Division GD Claude François Ferey (4,232 total)	2nd Brigade GB Labassée	66e Ligne (3 bns); 82e Ligne (2 bns)
	Cavalry Brigade GB Pierre Louis François Lamotte (334 total)	3e Hussards; 15e Chasseurs à Cheval
Corps total: 17,140 (16,806 infantry, 334 cavalry)

=== VIII Corps ===
GD Jean-Andoche Junot

Division	Brigade	Regiments and Others
2nd Division GD Jean-Baptiste Solignac (4,714 total)	1st Brigade GB Pierre Guillaume Gratien	15e Ligne (3 bns); 86e Ligne (3 bns)
2nd Division GD Jean-Baptiste Solignac (4,714 total)	2nd Brigade GB Jean Guillaume Barthélemy Thomières	65e Ligne (3 bns); Régiment Irlandais (1 bn)
Corps total: 4,714 infantry

=== IX Corps ===
GD Jean-Baptiste Drouet, Comte d'Erlon

Division	Brigade	Regiments and Others
1st Division GD Michel Marie Claparède (4,716 total)	1st Brigade	4th Battalion, 54e Ligne; 4th Battalion, 21e Légère; 4th Battalion, 28e Légère
1st Division GD Michel Marie Claparède (4,716 total)	2nd Brigade	4th Battalion, 40e Ligne; 4th Battalion, 63e Ligne; 4th Battalion, 88e Ligne
1st Division GD Michel Marie Claparède (4,716 total)	3rd Brigade	4th Battalion, 64e Ligne; 4th Battalion, 100e Ligne; 4th Battalion, 103e Ligne
2nd Division GD Nicolas François Conroux (5,588 total)	1st Brigade	4th Battalion, 9e Légère; 4th Battalion, 16e Légère; 4th Battalion, 27e Légère
2nd Division GD Nicolas François Conroux (5,588 total)	2nd Brigade	4th Battalion, 8e Ligne; 4th Battalion, 24e Ligne; 4th Battalion, 45e Ligne
2nd Division GD Nicolas François Conroux (5,588 total)	3rd Brigade	4th Battalion, 94e Ligne; 4th Battalion, 95e Ligne; 4th Battalion, 96e Ligne
	Cavalry Brigade GB François Fournier (794 total)	7e Chasseurs à Cheval (2 sqn); 13e Chasseurs à Cheval (2 sqn); 20e Chasseurs à Cheval (2 sqn)
Corps total: 11,098 (10,304 infantry, 794 cavalry)

=== Reserves ===
Division	Brigade	Regiments and Others
Reserve Cavalry Division GD Louis-Pierre Montbrun (1,187 total)	1st Brigade GB Cavrois	3e Dragons; 10e Dragons; 15e Dragons
Reserve Cavalry Division GD Louis-Pierre Montbrun (1,187 total)	2nd Brigade GB Philippe Antoine d'Ornano	6e Dragons; 11e Dragons; 25e Dragons
Army of the North (cavalry) Marshal Jean-Baptiste Bessières (1,665 total)	Imperial Guard Cavalry Brigade GB Louis Lepic (881 total)	Chevau-légers Lanciers de la Garde; Chasseurs à Cheval de la Garde; Grenadiers à Cheval de la Garde; Mameluks de la Garde (1 sqn)
Army of the North (cavalry) Marshal Jean-Baptiste Bessières (1,665 total)	Light Cavalry Brigade GB Pierre Watier (784 total)	11e Chasseurs à Cheval; 12e Chasseurs à Cheval; 24e Chasseurs à Cheval; 5e Hussards
Army of the North (cavalry) Marshal Jean-Baptiste Bessières (1,665 total)		1 Horse Battery
	Reserve Artillery GB Jean Baptiste Eblé (430 total)	4 Foot Batteries; 1 Horse Battery
Corps total: 4,182 (2,852 cavalry, 46 guns)

== Anglo-Portuguese Army ==
Commander-in-Chief: Lt Gen Viscount Wellington

Column Commander: Lt Gen Brent Spencer (1st & 3rd Divisions)

Total Strength: 36,813 (33,969 infantry, 1,857 cavalry, 48 guns)

=== 1st Division ===
Commanded by Lt Gen Brent Spencer
Brigade	Commander	Units	Strength
1st Brigade	Col Edward Stopford	1/Coldstream Guards; 1/3rd Guards; Coy, 5/60th Rifles	1,943
2nd Brigade	Maj Gen Nightingall / Lt Col Lord Blantyre	2/24th Foot; 2/42nd Foot; 1/79th Foot; Coy, 5/60th Rifles	1,774
3rd Brigade	Maj Gen Kenneth Howard	1/50th Foot; 1/71st Foot; 1/92nd Foot; Coy, 5/60th Rifles	1,934
4th Brigade	Maj Gen Sigismund von Löw	1st, 2nd, 5th, 7th KGL Line Battalions	1,914

=== 3rd Division ===
Commanded by Maj Gen Thomas Picton
Brigade	Commander	Units	Strength
1st Brigade	Col Henry MacKinnon	1/45th Foot; 1/74th Foot; 1/88th Foot; Coy, 5/60th Rifles	1,863
2nd Brigade	Maj Gen Charles Colville	2/5th Foot; 2/83rd Foot; 2/88th Foot; 94th Foot	1,967
Portuguese Brigade	Col Manley Power	9th Portuguese Line (2 bns); 21st Portuguese Line (2 bns)	1,650

=== 5th Division ===
Commanded by Maj Gen Sir William Erskine
Brigade	Commander	Units	Strength
1st Brigade	Col Andrew Hay	3/1st Foot; 1/9th Foot; 2/38th Foot; Coy, Brunswick Oels	1,740
2nd Brigade	Maj Gen James Dunlop	1/4th Foot; 2/30th Foot; 2/44th Foot; Coy, Brunswick Oels	1,624
Portuguese Brigade	Brig Gen William Spry	3rd Portuguese Line (2 bns); 15th Portuguese Line (2 bns)	1,764

=== 6th Division ===
Commanded by Maj Gen Alexander Campbell
Brigade	Commander	Units	Strength
1st Brigade	Col Richard Hulse	1/11th Foot; 2/53rd Foot; 1/61st Foot; Coy, 5/60th Rifles	2,041
2nd Brigade	Col Robert Burne	1/36th Foot	514
Portuguese Brigade	Brig Gen Baron Eben	8th Portuguese Line (2 bns); 12th Portuguese Line (2 bns)	2,137

=== 7th Division ===
Commanded by Maj Gen William Houston
Brigade	Commander	Units	Strength
1st Brigade	Maj Gen John Sontag	51st Foot; 85th Foot; Chasseurs Britanniques; Brunswick Oels Light Infantry (8 Coys)	2,409
Portuguese Brigade	Brig Gen John Milley Doyle	7th Portuguese Line (2 bns); 19th Portuguese Line (2 bns); 2nd Caçadores	2,181

=== Light Division ===
Commanded by Brig Gen Robert Craufurd
Brigade	Commander	Units	Strength
1st Brigade	Lt Col Thomas Beckwith	1/43rd Foot; 1/95th Rifles (4 Coys); 2/95th Rifles (1 Coy); 3rd Caçadores	1,631
2nd Brigade	Col George Drummond	1/52nd Foot; 2/52nd Foot; 1/95th Rifles (4 Coys); 1st Caçadores	2,184
Ashworth’s Portuguese Brigade	Col Charles Ashworth	6th Portuguese Line (2 bns); 18th Portuguese Line (2 bns); 6th Caçadores	2,539

=== Cavalry & Artillery ===
Commanded by Maj Gen Stapleton Cotton
Brigade	Commander	Units	Strength
1st Cavalry Brigade	Maj Gen John Slade	1st Dragoons; 14th Light Dragoons	766
2nd Cavalry Brigade	Lt Col Frederick von Arentschildt	16th Light Dragoons; 1st Hussars (KGL)	779
Portuguese Cavalry Brigade	Brig Gen Count Barbacena	4th Portuguese Dragoons; 10th Portuguese Dragoons	312
Reserve Artillery	Brig Gen Edward Howarth	Ross’s Troop, RHA; Bull’s Troop, RHA; Lawson’s Company, RA; Thompson’s Company, RA; da Cunha’s, Rozziere’s, de Preto’s, de Sequerra’s Portuguese Batteries	987

Army Total: 36,813 (33,969 infantry, 1,857 cavalry, 48 guns)
