= List of orders of battle for the British 3rd Division =

3rd Division 3rd Infantry Division
- The divisional insignia used since 1940
- Active: Raised and disbanded numerous times between 1809 and present
- Country: United Kingdom
- Branch: British Army
- Engagements: Napoleonic Wars; Crimean War; Second Boer War; First World War; Second World War

An order of battle is a list of the various elements of a military formation organised within a hierarchical command structure. It can also provide information on the strength of that formation and the equipment used. An order of battle is not necessarily a set structure, and it can change depending on tactical or strategic developments, or the evolution of military doctrine. For example, a division could be altered radically from one campaign to another through the adding or removing of subunits, but retain its identity and prior history. The size of a division can vary dramatically as a result of what forces are assigned and the doctrine employed at that time.

The first 3rd Division that was formed was a mere 3,747 men strong and did not include supporting weapons such as artillery. In comparison, the 3rd Infantry Division, from the Second World War period, was over 18,000 men strong and supported by 72 artillery pieces and numerous other support weapons. Each war that the division fought in, between 1809 and 1945, has a corresponding order of battle section.

== Napoleonic Wars ==
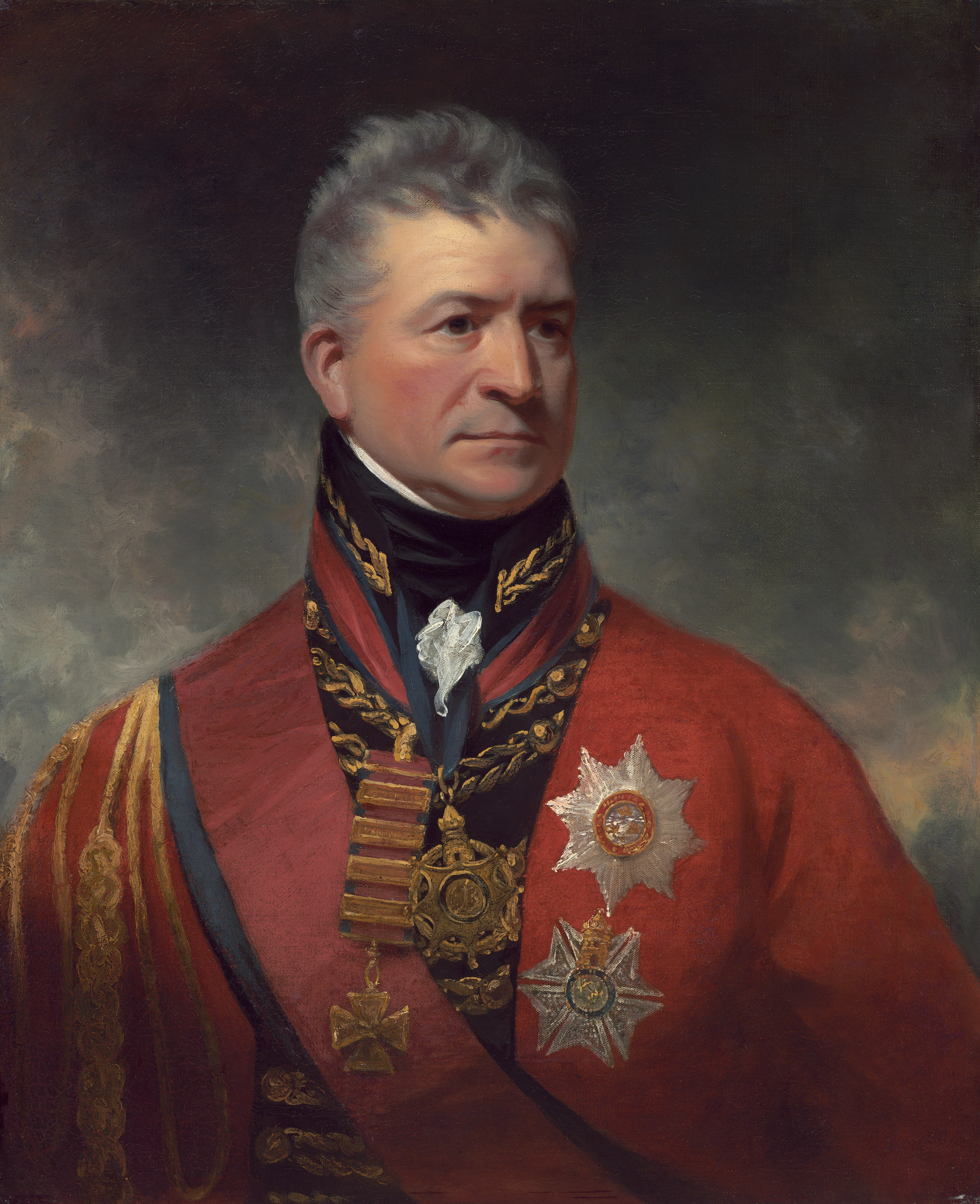
Portrait of Thomas Picton, the man who commanded the division for the majority of the Peninsular War, by William Beechey.

During the Napoleonic Wars (1803–1815), the British Army grew in size. On 18 June 1809, Lieutenant-General Arthur Wellesley, commander of the British forces in Spain and Portugal, ordered the creation of four divisions, including the 3rd Division. During the division's first action of the Peninsular War (the name given to Napoleonic Wars fought in Spain and Portugal), the Battle of Talavera (1809), it was 3,747 men strong. By the next year, it had grown to a strength of 4,743 men, including attached Portuguese troops. The strength of the division fluctuated over the following years, partially as a result of Portuguese troops being attached and detached. In 1811, the division had increased to 5,480 men. It then peaked at 7,437 men strong during 1813, before decreasing to 4,566 during the final stages of the Peninsular War. It was reformed on 11 April 1815, in the Southern Netherlands (modern-day Belgium), on the resumption of hostilities. It fought at the Battles of Quatre Bras and Waterloo, and had a strength of 6,970 men. It then marched into France. Shortly after, the Napoleonic Wars came to a conclusion. The division remained within the restored French kingdom, as part of the British Army of Occupation until it was disbanded in France during April 1817.

=== Talavera Campaign (July 1809) ===
During this period, brigades were referred to by their commander's names. Due to changes in command, the brigade names fluctuated frequently.

3rd Division

The division's 1st brigade:

- 2nd Battalion, 24th Regiment of Foot
- 2nd Battalion, 31st Regiment of Foot
- 1st Battalion, 45th Regiment of Foot

The division's 2nd brigade:

- 2nd Battalion, 87th Regiment of Foot
- 1st Battalion, 88th Regiment of Foot
- Five companies, 5th Battalion, 60th Regiment of Foot

=== Battle of Bussao (September 1810) ===
During this period, brigades were referred to by their commander's names. Due to changes in command, the brigade names fluctuated frequently.

3rd Division

The division's 1st brigade:

- 1st Battalion, 45th Regiment of Foot
- 1st Battalion, 74th Regiment of Foot
- 1st Battalion, 88th Regiment of Foot

The division's 2nd brigade:

- 2nd Battalion, 5th Regiment of Foot
- 2nd Battalion, 83rd Regiment of Foot
- 5th Battalion (three companies), 90th Regiment of Foot

Portuguese Brigade:

- 9th Line Regiment (two battalions)
- 21st Line Regiment (one battalion)

=== Battle of Fuentes de Oñoro (May 1811) ===
During this period, brigades were referred to by their commander's names. Due to changes in command, the brigade names fluctuated frequently.

3rd Division

The division's 1st brigade:

- 1st Battalion, 45th Regiment of Foot
- 1st Battalion, 74th Regiment of Foot
- 1st Battalion, 88th Regiment of Foot
- 5th Battalion, 60th Regiment of Foot (three companies)

The division's 2nd brigade:

- 2nd Battalion, 5th Regiment of Foot
- 2nd Battalion, 83rd Regiment of Foot
- 2nd Battalion, 88th Regiment of Foot
- 94th Regiment of Foot

Portuguese Brigade:

- 9th Line Regiment (two battalions)
- 21st Line Regiment (two battalions)

=== Vittoria campaign (June 1813) ===
During this period, brigades were referred to by their commander's names. Due to changes in command, the brigade names fluctuated frequently.

3rd Division

The division's 1st brigade:

- 1st Battalion, 45th Regiment of Foot
- 74th Regiment of Foot
- 1st Battalion, 88th Regiment of Foot
- 5th Battalion, 60th Regiment of Foot (three companies)

The division's 2nd brigade:

- 1st Battalion, 5th Regiment of Foot
- 2nd Battalion, 83rd Regiment of Foot
- 2nd Battalion, 87th Regiment of Foot
- 94th Regiment of Foot

Portuguese Brigade:

- 9th Line Regiment
- 21st Line Regiment
- 11th Caçadores

=== Hundred Days campaign (1814) ===
3rd Division

British Fifth Brigade

- 2nd Battalion, 30th Regiment of Foot
- 33rd Regiment of Foot
- 2nd Battalion, 69th Regiment of Foot
- 2nd Battalion, 73rd Regiment of Foot

Second King's German Legion Brigade

- 1st Light Battalion
- 2nd Light Battalion
- 5th Line Battalion
- 8th Line Battalion

First Hanoverian Brigade

- Field Battalion Bremen
- Field Battalion Verden
- Field Battalion York
- Field Battalion Lüneburg
- Field Battalion Grubenhagen
- Field Jäger Corps

Divisional Artillery

- British Foot Battery
- King's German Legion Foot Battery

== Crimean War (1854–1856) ==
During the war, each division within the expeditionary force had a 1st and a 2nd Brigade.

=== 1854–1855 ===
3rd Division

1st brigade:

- 1st Battalion, Royal Regiment of Foot
- 38th (1st Staffordshire) Regiment of Foot
- 50th (Queen's Own) Regiment of Foot
- 89th (Princess Victoria's) Regiment of Foot (had joined by January 1855)

2nd brigade:

- 4th (The King's Own) Regiment of Foot
- 28th (North Gloucestershire) Regiment of Foot
- 44th (East Essex) Regiment of Foot
- 9th (East Norfolk) Regiment of Foot (had joined by January 1855)

Divisional artillery, Royal Artillery

- F Battery
- W Battery (had left by the Battle of Balaclava, in October 1854)

=== June–December 1855 ===
3rd Division (Note: R. Ffrench Blake, a historian who has written about the Crimean War, provided an alternative order of battle for the division's 1st Brigade during July 1855. 1st Brigade: 4th (The King's Own Royal) Regiment of Foot, 14th (Buckinghamshire) Regiment of Foot, 39th (Dorsetshire) Regiment of Foot, 50th (Queen's Own) Regiment of Foot, and 89th (Princess Victoria's) Regiment of Foot.)

1st brigade:

- 1st Battalion, Royal Regiment of Foot
- 4th (The King's Own Royal) Regiment of Foot
- 39th (Dorsetshire) Regiment of Foot
- 50th (Queen's Own) Regiment of Foot
- 89th (Princess Victoria's) Regiment of Foot

2nd brigade:

- 9th (East Norfolk) Regiment of Foot (left the division by August 1855)
- 18th (The Royal Irish) Regiment of Foot
- 28th (North Gloucestershire) Regiment of Foot
- 38th (1st Staffordshire) Regiment of Foot
- 44th (East Essex) Regiment of Foot

Divisional artillery, Royal Artillery

- F Battery
- W Battery (rejoined the division by August 1855)
- #4 Ball Cartridge Brigade

=== 1856 (until April) ===
3rd Division

1st brigade:

- 4th (The King's Own Royal) Regiment of Foot
- 14th (Buckinghamshire) Regiment of Foot
- 39th (Dorsetshire) Regiment of Foot
- 50th (Queen's Own) Regiment of Foot

2nd brigade:

- 18th (The Royal Irish) Regiment of Foot
- 28th (North Gloucestershire) Regiment of Foot
- 38th (1st Staffordshire) Regiment of Foot
- 44th (East Essex) Regiment of Foot

Divisional artillery, Royal Artillery

- F Battery
- W Battery
- #4 Ball Cartridge Brigade

=== 1856 (after April) ===
3rd Division

1st brigade:

- 4th (The King's Own Royal) Regiment of Foot
- 28th (North Gloucestershire) Regiment of Foot
- 50th (Queen's Own) Regiment of Foot

2nd brigade:

- 18th (The Royal Irish) Regiment of Foot
- 38th (1st Staffordshire) Regiment of Foot
- 44th (East Essex) Regiment of Foot

Divisional artillery, Royal Artillery

- F Battery
- W Battery
- #4 Ball Cartridge Brigade

== Second Boer War ==
=== On mobilisation in 1899 ===
3rd Division

5th Brigade (Irish Brigade)

- 1st Battalion, Royal Inniskilling Fusiliers
- 2nd Battalion, Royal Irish Rifles
- 1st Battalion, Connaught Rangers
- 1st Battalion, Royal Dublin Fusiliers
- Supply Column (Train Company, No. 30)
- Litter Bearer Company, No. 16
- Field Ambulance No. 10

6th Brigade (Fusilier Brigade)

- 2nd Battalion, Royal Fusiliers
- 2nd Battalion, Royal Scots Fusiliers
- 1st Battalion, Royal Welch Fusiliers
- 2nd Battalion, Royal Irish Fusiliers
- Supply Column (Train Company, No. 36)
- Litter Bearer Company, No. 17
- Field Ambulance No. 11

Divisional Troops:

- 14th King's Hussars (1 squadron)
- Divisional artillery, Royal Artillery
  - No. 74 Field Battery
  - No. 77 Field Battery
  - No. 79 Field Battery
  - Ammunition Column
- Field Engineer Company, No. 12
- Supply Column (Train Company, No. 33)
- Field Ambulance No. 7

=== January 1900 ===
3rd Division

5th Brigade

- 1st Battalion, Royal Inniskilling Fusiliers
- 1st Battalion, Connaught Rangers
- 1st Battalion, Royal Dublin Fusiliers
- 1st Battalion, Border Regiment

6th Brigade

- 2nd Battalion, Royal Fusiliers
- 2nd Battalion, Royal Scots Fusiliers
- 1st Battalion, Royal Welch Fusiliers
- 2nd Battalion, Royal Irish Fusiliers

Divisional Troops:

- 14th King's Hussars (1 squadron)
- Divisional artillery, Royal Artillery
  - No. 63 Field Battery
  - No. 64 Field Battery
  - No. 73 Field Battery

=== February 1900, onwards ===
3rd Division

5th Brigade

- 1st Battalion, Royal Inniskilling Fusiliers
- 1st Battalion, Connaught Rangers
- 1st Battalion, Royal Dublin Fusiliers
- 1st Battalion, Border Regiment

6th Brigade

- 2nd Battalion, Royal Fusiliers
- 2nd Battalion, Royal Scots Fusiliers
- 1st Battalion, Royal Welch Fusiliers
- 2nd Battalion, Royal Irish Fusiliers

Divisional Troops:

- 13th Hussars (1 squadron)
- Divisional artillery, Royal Artillery
  - No. 63 Field Battery
  - No. 64 Field Battery
  - No. 73 Field Battery

=== April 1900, onwards ===
3rd Division

22nd Brigade

- 2nd Battalion, Royal Irish Rifles
- 2nd Battalion, Northumberland Fusiliers
- 1st Battalion, Royal Scots
- 2nd Battalion, Berkshire Regiment

23rd Brigade

- Composition not known

Divisional Troops:

- Divisional artillery, Royal Artillery
  - No. 74 Field Battery
  - No. 77 Field Battery
  - No. 79 Field Battery

== First World War ==
On 28 July 1914, the First World War began. On 4 August, Germany invaded Belgium and the United Kingdom entered the war against the German Empire. The division soon after deployed to France, as part of the British Expeditionary Force, and it then served on the Western Front between 1914 and 1918.

The war establishment, the on-paper strength, of an infantry division in 1914 was 18,179 men, 5,594 horses, 18 motor vehicles, 76 pieces of artillery, and 24 machine guns. While there was a small change to the number of men and horses in a division in 1915, the main change was the decrease in artillery pieces to 48 and an increase in motor vehicles to 54. The establishment in 1916 increased the division size to 19,372 men, 5,145 horses, 61 motor vehicles, 64 artillery pieces, 40 trench mortars, and 200 machine guns. The 1917 changes saw a decrease to 18,825 men, 4,342 horses, 57 motor vehicles, and 48 artillery pieces, although the number of trench mortars remained the same, and the number of machine guns increased to 264. By 1918, the number of front line infantry within the British Army in France had decreased because of casualties and a lack of eligible replacements, and this had led to a manpower crisis. To consolidate manpower and to increase the ratio of machine guns and artillery support available to the infantry, the number of battalions in a division was reduced from twelve to nine. This resulted in the 1918 establishment of 16,035 men, 3,838 horses, 79 motor vehicles, 48 artillery pieces, 36 trench mortars, and 400 machine guns.

=== First World War (1914–1918) ===
3rd Division (Note: Unless otherwise noted, the division's order of battle during the First World War is sourced from Archibald Becke's Order of Battle of Divisions Part 1: The Regular British Divisions.)

7th Infantry Brigade (until 18 October 1915)

- 3rd Battalion, Worcestershire Regiment
- 2nd Battalion, South Lancashire Regiment
- 1st Battalion, Wiltshire Regiment
- 2nd Battalion, Royal Irish Rifles
- 1st Battalion, Honourable Artillery Company (from 9 December 1914, until 14 October 1915)
- 1/4th Battalion, South Lancashire Regiment (until 12 October 1915)

8th Infantry Brigade

- 2nd Battalion, Royal Scots
- 2nd Battalion, Royal Irish Regiment (until 24 October 1914))
- 4th Battalion, Middlesex Regiment (until 13 November 1915)
- 1st Battalion, Gordon Highlanders (until 12 September 1914; then from 30 September 1914, until 19 October 1915)
- 1st Battalion, Devonshire Regiment (from 12 September until 30 September 1914)
- 1st Battalion, Honourable Artillery Company (from 10 November, until 9 December 1914)
- 2nd Battalion, Suffolk Regiment (from 25 October 1914, until 22 October 1915)
- 4th Battalion, Gordon Highlanders (from 27 February until 19 October 1915; then from 4 February until 23 February 1916)
- 7th (Service) Battalion, King's Shropshire Light Infantry (from on 19 October 1915)
- 13th (Service) Battalion, King's (Liverpool Regiment) (from 23 October 1915, until 4 April 1916)
- 1/5th (City of London) Battalion, London Regiment (from 25 October 1915 until February 1916) (Note: During February 1916, the battalion rotated through the division's three brigades and was then attached to the divisional troops. On 9 February, the battalion left the division.)
- 8th (Service) Battalion, East Yorkshire Regiment (from 16 November 1915)
- 1st Battalion, Royal Scots Fusiliers (from 5 April 1916)
- 8th Brigade Machine Gun Company (formed on 22 January 1916)
- 8th Trench Mortar Battery (formed 18 April 1916)

9th Infantry Brigade (Note: The 9th Brigade was detached from the division on 17 February 1915, and rejoined 2 April 1915.)

- 1st Battalion, Northumberland Fusiliers
- 4th Battalion, Royal Fusiliers
- 1st Battalion, Lincolnshire Regiment (until 13 November 1915)
- 1st Battalion, Royal Scots Fusiliers (until 5 April 1916)
- 1/10th (Scottish) Battalion, King's (Liverpool Regiment) (from 25 November 1914, until 6 January 1916) (Note: Becke stated that the battalion was attached to the 9th Brigade effective 2 March 1915. Everard Wyrall, who compiled the history of the King's Regiment (Liverpool), stated the battalion joined the brigade on 25 November and quoted the brigade headquarters' diary to verify that date.)
- 12th (Service) Battalion, West Yorkshire Regiment (from 16 November 1915, until 17 February 1918)
- 13th (Service) Battalion, King's (Liverpool Regiment) (from 4 April 1916)
- 9th Brigade Machine Gun Company (formed on 8 February 1916, until 6 March 1918)
- 9th Trench Mortar Battery (formed 1 May 1916)

85th Infantry Brigade (joined 19 February 1915, left between 2 and 6 April 1915)

- 2nd Battalion, Buffs (Royal East Kent Regiment)
- 3rd Battalion, Royal Fusiliers
- 2nd Battalion, East Surrey Regiment
- 3rd Battalion, Middlesex Regiment
- 1/10th (Scottish) Battalion, King's (Liverpool Regiment) (until 2 March 1915)
- 8th battalion, Middlesex Regiment (from 11 March 1915)

76th Infantry Brigade (from 15 October 1915)

- 8th (Service) Battalion, King's Own (Royal Lancaster Regiment)
- 13th (Service) Battalion, King's (Liverpool Regiment)
- 10th Battalion, Royal Welsh Fusiliers (until 15 February 1918)
- 7th (Service) Battalion, King's Shropshire Light Infantry
- 1st Battalion, Gordon Highlanders (from 19 October 1915)
- 2nd Battalion, Suffolk Regiment (from 22 October 1915)
- 76th Brigade Machine Gun Company (formed on 13 April 1916, until 6 March 1918)
- 76th Trench Mortar Battery (formed 1 April 1916)

Divisional Mounted Troops

- A Squadron, 15th The King's Hussars (until 14 April 1915)
- B Squadron, South Irish Horse (from 14 April 1915, until 11 May 1916)
- 3rd Cyclist Company (until 31 May 1916)
- B Squadron, Queen's Own Royal Glasgow Yeomanry (from 10 May 1916, until 1 June 1916)

Divisional Artillery

- XXIII Brigade, Royal Field Artillery (until 21 January 1917)
  - 107th Battery
  - 108th Battery
  - 109th Battery (until 10 February 1916)
  - D (Howitzer) Battery (from 11 May 1916 until 21 January 1917)
  - XXIII Brigade, Brigade Ammunition Column
- XL Brigade, Royal Field Artillery
  - 6th Battery
  - 23rd Battery
  - 49th Battery
  - 130th (Howitzer) Battery (from 14 May 1916)
  - XL Brigade, Brigade Ammunition Column
- XLII Brigade, Royal Field Artillery
  - 29th Battery
  - 41st Battery
  - 45th Battery
  - 129th (Howitzer) Battery (from 14 May 1916)
- XXX (Howitzer) Brigade, Royal Field Artillery (broken up on 14 May 1916)
  - 128th (Howitzer) Battery
  - 129th (Howitzer) Battery
  - 130th (Howitzer) Battery (until 25 June 1915)
  - XXX (Howitzer) Brigade, Brigade Ammunition Column
- 48th Heavy Battery, Royal Garrison Artillery (until 19 April 1915)
  - 48th Heavy Battery Ammunition Column
- X.3 Medium Trench Mortar Battery, Royal Field Artillery (formed February 1916)
- Y.3 Medium Trench Mortar Battery, Royal Field Artillery (formed February 1916)
- Z.3 Medium Trench Mortar Battery, Royal Field Artillery (formed February 1916, until February 1918 when distributed between X and Y batteries)
- V.3 Heavy Trench Mortar Battery, Royal Garrison Artillery (formed July 1916, until 6 March 1918)
- 2nd Divisional Ammunition Column
- No. 5 Pom-Pom Section (A.-A.) (from 20 September until December 1914)
- 5th Mountain Battery (from 14 December 1914 until 3 March 1915)

Divisional Engineers, Royal Engineers

- 56th Field Company
- 57th Field Company (until 7 April 1915)
- 56th Field Company
- 1st Cheshire Field Company (from 22 December 1914; the company was later renamed the 438th (Cheshire) Field Company, and then the 438th Field Company)
- 1st East Riding Field Company (from 20 September 1915; the company was later renamed the 529th (East Riding) Field Company, and then the 529th Field Company)
- 3rd Divisional Signal Company

Divisional Pioneers

- 20th (Service) Battalion, King's Royal Rifle Corps (British Empire League Pioneers) (joined 19 May 1916)

Divisional Machine Guns

- 233rd Machine Gun Company (formed 18 July 1917)
- No. 2 Battalion, Machine Gun Corps (formed 6 March 1918)
  - 3rd Machine Gun Company
  - 9th Machine Gun Company
  - 76th Machine Gun Company
  - 233rd Machine Gun Company

Divisional Medical Services, Royal Army Medical Corps

- 7th Field Ambulance
- 8th Field Ambulance
- 9th Field Ambulance (until 26 August 1915)
- 142nd Field Ambulance (from 26 August 1915)
- No. 4 A Sanitary Section (from 9 January 1915; renamed No. 5 Sanitary Section, April 1916; left 3 April 1917)
- 3rd Division, Ambulance Workshop (from 18 April 1915, until 9 April 1916 when merged with divisional supply column)

Divisional Veterinary Services, Army Veterinary Corps

- 11th Mobile Veterinary Section

Divisional Services, Army Service Corps

- 3rd Divisional Train
  - 15th Company
  - 21st Company
  - 22nd Company
  - 29th Company
- 8th Divisional Employment Company (from 31 May 1917, renumbered 206th in June 1917)

== Second World War ==
In 1939, following the German invasion of Poland, the United Kingdom declared war in support of the latter and entered the Second World War.

The war establishment of an infantry division in 1939 was 13,863 men, 2,993 vehicles, 72 artillery pieces, 48 anti-tank guns, 361 anti-tank rifles, 126 mortars, and 700 machine guns. In 1941, the war establishment was changed to 17,298 men, 4,166 vehicles, 72 artillery pieces, 48 anti-tanks guns, 444 anti-tank rifles, 48 anti-aircraft guns, 218 mortars, and 867 machine guns. From 1944, the establishment was updated to 18,347 men, 4,330 vehicles, 72 artillery pieces, 110 anti-tank guns, 436 other anti-tank weapons, 359 mortars, and 1,302 machine guns.

=== Second World War (1939) ===
7th Guards Brigade

- 1st Battalion, Grenadier Guards
- 2nd Battalion, Grenadier Guards
- 1st Battalion, Coldstream Guards
- 7th Guards Brigade Anti-Tank Company

8th Infantry Brigade

- 1st Battalion, Suffolk Regiment
- 2nd Battalion, East Yorkshire Regiment
- 2nd Battalion, Gloucestershire Regiment (until 5 February 1940)
- 4th Battalion, Royal Berkshire Regiment (Territorial Army) (from 5 February 1940)
- 8th Infantry Brigade Anti-Tank Company

9th Infantry Brigade

- 2nd Battalion, Lincolnshire Regiment
- 1st Battalion, King's Own Scottish Borderers
- 2nd Battalion, Royal Ulster Rifles
- 9th Infantry Brigade Anti-Tank Company

Divisional Troops

- 15th/19th The King's Royal Hussars (until 31 March 1940)
- 7th Field Regiment, Royal Artillery
- 23rd Field Regiment, Royal Artillery (until 5 March 1940)
- 33rd Field Regiment, Royal Artillery
- 76th (Highland) Field Regiment, Royal Artillery (Territorial Army) (from 5 March 1940)
- 20th Anti-Tank Regiment, Royal Artillery
- 246th Field Company, Royal Engineers
- 248th Field Company, Royal Engineers (until 2 November 1939)
- 253rd Field Company, Royal Engineers
- 17th Field Company, Royal Engineers (from 2 November 1939)
- 15th Field Park Company, Royal Engineers
- 3rd Division Signals, Royal Corps of Signals
- 8th Battalion, Royal Northumberland Fusiliers (Territorial Army) – (Motorcycle Battalion)
- 2nd Battalion, Middlesex Regiment – (Machine Gun Battalion) (CO: Lieutenant Colonel Brian Horrocks)

=== Second World War (1940–1945) ===
7th Infantry Brigade (Until June 1942)

- 2nd Battalion, South Wales Borderers
- 2/6th Battalion, East Surrey Regiment
- 6th Battalion, Royal Sussex Regiment
- 7th Infantry Brigade Anti-Tank Company

8th Infantry Brigade

- 1st Battalion, Suffolk Regiment
- 2nd Battalion, East Yorkshire Regiment
- 1st Battalion, South Lancashire Regiment

9th Infantry Brigade

- 2nd Battalion, Lincolnshire Regiment
- 1st Battalion, King's Own Scottish Borderers
- 2nd Battalion, Royal Ulster Rifles

185th Infantry Brigade (1943 onwards)

- 2nd Battalion, Royal Warwickshire Regiment
- 1st Battalion, Royal Norfolk Regiment
- 2nd Battalion, King's Shropshire Light Infantry

33rd Tank Brigade (June 1942 - 1943)

- 43rd Royal Tank Regiment
- 144th Regiment Royal Armoured Corps
- 148th Regiment Royal Armoured Corps

Divisional Troops

- 2nd Battalion, Middlesex Regiment (Machine Gun Battalion)
- 3rd Reconnaissance Regiment, Reconnaissance Corps
- 7th Field Regiment, Royal Artillery
- 33rd Field Regiment, Royal Artillery
- 76th (Highland) Field Regiment, Royal Artillery
- 20th Anti-Tank Regiment, Royal Artillery
- 92nd (Loyals) Light Anti-Aircraft Regiment, Royal Artillery
- 17th Field Company, Royal Engineers
- 246th Field Company, Royal Engineers
- 253rd Field Company, Royal Engineers
- 15th Field Park Company, Royal Engineers
- 3rd Division Signals Regiment, Royal Corps of Signals
