= John Doveton =

Sir John Doveton
- Born: 1768; St. Helena
- Died: 7 November 1847 (aged 78–79); Madras, British India
- Burial place: St. Mary's Church
- Military career
- Allegiance: East India Company
- Branch: Madras Army
- Service years: 1783-1820
- Rank: Lieutenant-general
- Conflicts: Third Anglo-Mysore War; Fourth Anglo-Mysore War; Third Anglo-Maratha War
- Awards: Knight Grand Cross of the Order of the Bath; Companion of the Bath

Lieutenant-general Sir John Doveton GCB (1768 – 7 November 1847) was a British military officer in the East India Company's Madras Army.

== Early life ==
He was born in St. Helena, the son of Jonathan Doveton, a planter and factor and his wife Mary Harper.

== Rising status ==
Doveton entered the service of the East India Company as an ensign of infantry on 30 April 1783 and joined the Madras European Regiment serving in the southern army under William Fullarton. He was transferred to the cavalry as a cornet on 5 December 1785. He was made lieutenant in 1787.

He served with James Stephenson's regiment of cavalry and in Third Anglo-Mysore War was present at the Battle of Sittimungulum, Siege of Bangalore and Siege of Seringapatam (1792). He was thanked by authorities in India and Parliament. In the Fourth Anglo-Mysore War he was present at the Battle of Mallavelly and the Siege of Seringapatam (1799). He served under Colonel Arthur Wellesley in the pursuit of Dhondia Wagh and was present at the battle and his death. He was later thanked in general orders by Wellesley for his role in the campaign. He also served in the Poligar campaign under Patrick Agnew, and was present at the capture of Pandalamworehy, for which he was again thanked by authorities in India and parliament in Britain.

He was promoted to captain on 8 May 1800 and to major on 2 September 1801. On 15 October 1804 he was made lieutenant-colonel and given command of the cavalry brigade. In 1807 he commanded a force stationed in Berar and made resident to the Raja Govina Bucksh. Thereafter he was appointed to the command at Arcot. In 1808 he served under Colonels Wallace and Halliburton in a campaign against the Pindaris. He led a forced march for 120 miles from Jaulna, defeating the Pathan chiefs, dispersing their entire army and capturing 17 guns.

== Madras Revolt ==
In 1808, Sir George Barlow, the Governor-General of the Madras Presidency abolished the tent contract system to reduce expenditure. The peacetime allowance for regimental tentage provided a supplemental income for commanding officers in the Madras Army and its abolishment drew heavy criticism from officers who were to be denied of this income and who felt they were now being accused of embezzlement. In July 1809 Barlow demanded officers sign a declaration of loyalty yet only around 150 officers did so out of approximately 3,000. In turn a number of detachments at locations including Hyderabad, Seringapatnam, Jaulna, Masulipatam and Ellore passed into open revolt.

Doveton, then Commandant of a field force at Jaulna, revolted and along with the Commandants at Seringapatnam and Masulipatam, Lieutenant-Colonel John Bell and Major Joseph Storey, he was tried at a Court Martial which began in November 1809. Following deliberation Doveton was initially acquitted but later suspended on pay and allowances, whilst Bell and Storey were dismissed from the army.

== Redemption ==
On 14 June 1813 he was promoted colonel and the following year commanded a contingent at Hyderabad with the rank of brigadier-General. The contingent, paid for by the Nizam of Hyderabad, consisted of around ten thousand men led by British officers, and was intended to provide a greater garrison in the Nizam's vast territory.

During the Pindari War, Doveton achieved distinction for his rapid relief against of Nagpur. For his actions, he was made a Companion of the Bath in 1818, and a Knight Commander of the Order of the Bath in November 1819. In August 1819 he was promoted to major-general and the following year resigned from the army.

== Later life and death ==
On retirement, Doveton remained in Madras. He was promoted to lieutenant-general and made a Knight Grand Cross of the Order of the Bath in 1837.

He died at his house in Nungambakkam on 7 November 1847 aged 77 years. His funeral was attended by large numbers and he was buried at St. Mary's Church.
