= William Knox (British Army officer) =

Lieutenant-General Sir William Knox KCB
- Born: 20 October 1847
- Died: 14 December 1916 (aged 69)
- Burial place: Temple, Midlothian
- Military career
- Allegiance: United Kingdom
- Branch: British Army
- Service years: 1867–1910
- Rank: Lieutenant-General
- Commands: 8th Division
- Conflicts: Expedition to Abyssinia; Third Anglo-Ashanti War; Russo-Turkish War; Second Anglo-Afghan War; Anglo-Zulu War; Second Boer War
- Awards: Knight Commander of the Order of the Bath

Lieutenant-General Sir William George Knox, KCB (20 October 1847 – 14 December 1916) was a British Army officer who became General Officer Commanding 8th Division.

== Military career ==
Born the son of General Thomas Edmond Knox, William Knox was commissioned into the Royal Artillery in 1867. He took part in Expedition to Abyssinia in 1868, in the Third Anglo-Ashanti War in 1874 and in the Russo-Turkish War in 1877. He also fought in the Second Anglo-Afghan War in 1878, was promoted to captain on 23 January 1879, and fought in the Anglo-Zulu War later the same year. Promoted to major on 21 April 1880, he was appointed Commander of the Royal Horse Artillery at Curragh Camp that year, and promoted to lieutenant-colonel on 2 October 1891. After promotion to colonel on 27 August 1898, he then took part in the Second Boer War (1899–1902), being present at the defence of Ladysmith in 1900. In April 1900 he was appointed in command of the 23rd Brigade, serving as part of the 10th Division.

Knox stayed in South Africa until after the war ended in May 1902, and two months later left by the SS Briton for Southampton. For his service in the war, he was mentioned in despatches (including by Lord Kitchener dated 23 June 1902), received the Queen's South Africa Medal, and was appointed a Knight Commander of the Order of the Bath (KCB) in the April 1901 South Africa Honours list (the order was dated to 29 November 1900, and he was only invested as such after his return home, by King Edward VII at Buckingham Palace on 24 October 1902).

Following his return to the United Kingdom, Knox was on 9 September 1902 appointed a Major-General on the Staff Commanding Royal Artillery of the 3rd Army Corps, stationed in Ireland. He was appointed General Officer Commanding 8th Division in Southern Ireland in 1905 before retiring in 1910.

== Family ==
In 1889 he married Alice Dundas, daughter of Sir Robert Dundas, 1st Baronet.

Military offices
Preceded by Reginald Pole-Carew	General Officer Commanding the 8th Division; 1905–1906	Succeeded by Lawrence Parsons
