= F. I. Ricarde-Seaver =

19th-century Spanish soldier and scientist

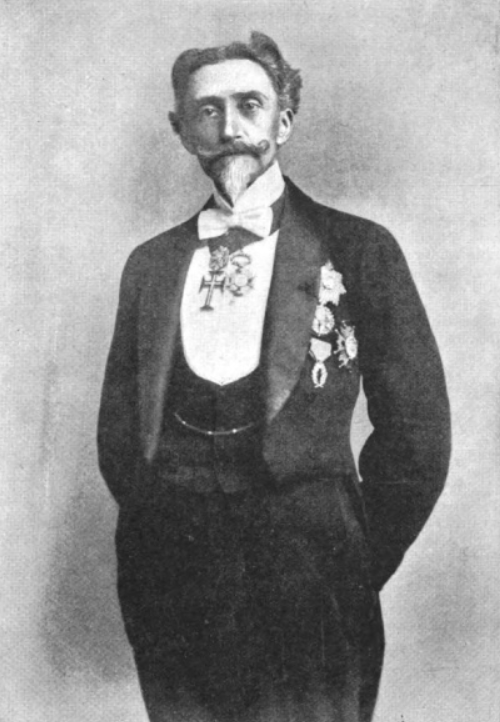
- Born: Francisco Ignacio Ricarde-Seaver c. 1850
- Died: 15 July 1906; Ventnor, England
- Spouses: Dona Marie Louise Christine do Godoy de Bassano y Crowe; Lucretia Charras

Major Francisco Ignacio Ricarde-Seaver (occasionally Ricarde-Lever) FRSE FGS (c. 1850 – 1906) was a 19th-century Spanish soldier and amateur geologist and botanist. He corresponded with Joseph Dalton Hooker on various issues. He had strong associations to several gold mines, mainly in South Africa.

== Life ==
His background and place of birth is unclear. He is termed "Major" in most references and is presumed to have been in the Royal Engineers (due to his mining interests) or possibly (due to his connections to Sir Charles Metcalfe) in the Rifle Brigade.

In 1872 he was elected a Fellow of the Royal Society of Edinburgh, his proposer being Robert William Thomson.

In 1881 he translated William Crookes' "Radiant Material" into Spanish for a lecture to the Britannic Association.

In 1895 he donated a seal impression to the British Museum. In the same year he is listed as Chairman of Rhodesian Claims Ltd and Director of the Bechuanaland Exploration Company. In one of the few places to list his address he is shown as living at 16 Grafton Street in central London an elegant five storey Regency townhouse.

In 1900 he stood (unsuccessfully) for election as the Conservative candidate in West Newington.

In 1902 he appears as Chairman of Norseman Gold Mines Ltd (offices based in London) at the point of its liquidation. This appears to be a mine in South Africa rather than the later Australian company of the same name.

== Publications ==
- In 1889 he wrote articles regarding propaganda in Rhodesia in the Fortnightly Review with Sir Charles Metcalfe.
- British Sphere of Influence in South Africa (1889) again with Sir Charles Metcalfe
- Diamonds and Gold - Anglo-Saxon Supremacy in South Africa (1894)
- Boer, Afrikander and Briton in the Transvaal (1896)

== Family ==
He married Dona Marie Louise Christine do Godoy de Bassano y Crowe (1839-1880), widow of Prince Ernest de Looz-Corswarem (1834-1868), a member of the Belgian aristocracy.

Through this marriage he became stepfather of Princess Manuela de Looz-Corswarem.

He appears to have remarried. His second wife Lucretia Charras died in London in October 1901.

F. I. Ricarde-Seaver died in Ventnor on 15 July 1906. He was cremated at Golders Green Crematorium in London.
