= Robert Burne (British Army officer) =

Lieutenant-General Robert Burne
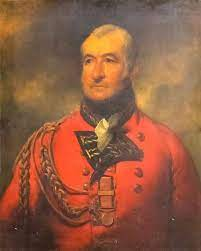
- Lieutenant-General Robert Burne
- Born: c. 1753
- Died: 16 June 1825; Stanmore, Middlesex
- Military career
- Allegiance: United Kingdom
- Branch: British Army
- Service years: 1773–1814
- Rank: Lieutenant-General
- Unit: 36th Regiment of Foot
- Commands: 6th Division
- Conflicts: Third Anglo-Mysore War; Battle of Sittimungulum; Siege of Bangalore; Siege of Seringapatam; French Revolutionary Wars; Siege of Pondicherry; Napoleonic Wars; Hanover Expedition; British invasions of the River Plate; Peninsular War; Battle of Rolica; Battle of Vimeiro; Battle of Corunna; Battle of Fuentes de Oñoro; Walcheren Campaign

Lieutenant-General Robert Burne (c. 1753 – 16 June 1825) was a senior British Army officer who saw action in the Napoleonic Wars.

== Military career ==
Burne was commissioned as an ensign in the 36th Regiment of Foot in 1773. He was deployed to India in 1783 and saw action at the Battle of Sittimungulum in September 1790 during the Third Anglo-Mysore War and then at the Siege of Pondicherry in August 1793 during the French Revolutionary Wars. After being sent to Minorca in 1800, he was dispatched to Hanover under the command of General William Cathcart in 1805. He then saw action during the British invasion of the River Plate in 1806.

Deployed to Spain for service in the Peninsular War, he saw action at the Battle of Vimeiro in August 1808 and the retreat to Corunna in January 1809. After taking part in the Walcheren Campaign in autumn 1809, he returned to Spain where he served as temporary General Officer Commanding the 6th Division in its formative months from November 1810 to February 1811. He then commanded the 2nd Brigade in the 6th Division from March to November 1811 and from February to April 1812. In that role he saw action at the Battle of Fuentes de Oñoro in May 1811. He was promoted to lieutenant-general on 19 July 1821.
