= Charles Metcalfe (British Army officer) =

British Army general (1856–1912)

Major-General Charles Metcalfe CB
- Born: 7 February 1856; Edinburgh, Scotland
- Died: 1912 (aged 55–56)
- Military career
- Allegiance: United Kingdom
- Branch: British Army
- Service years: 1874–1910
- Rank: Major-General
- Commands: 2nd Bn the Rifle Brigade; 6th Division
- Conflicts: Second Boer War
- Awards: Companion of the Order of the Bath

Major-General Charles Theophilus Evelyn Metcalfe, CB (7 February 1856 – 1912) was a British Army officer who became general officer commanding 6th Division.

== Military career ==
Educated at Malvern Wells, Eton College and the Royal Military College, Sandhurst, Metcalfe was commissioned into the Rifle Brigade as a lieutenant in September 1874. Promoted to captain on 1 January 1884, he took part in the Burma expedition in 1886. After promotion to major on 17 May 1893, he then joined the Tochi Field Force on the North West Frontier of India in 1897, following which he was promoted to lieutenant-colonel on 5 December 1898.

He served as commanding officer of 2nd Battalion of the Rifle Brigade during the Second Boer War, taking part in the Relief of Ladysmith, and was promoted to colonel on 29 November 1900. For his service in the war, he was appointed a Companion of the Order of the Bath (CB) in the October 1902 South African honours list. He stayed in South Africa until after the war had ended in June 1902, and received the substantive rank of colonel on 7 November 1902, when he was appointed colonel on the Staff commanding the Troops in British Mauritius with the local rank of brigadier-general. The Mauritius command had been vacant since the start of the war in late 1899. Leaving Port Natal on the SS Ortona in early November, he arrived at Port Louis to take up the command on 12 November 1902.

He was placed on half-pay in December 1906, and, promoted to major general in February 1907, he was appointed general officer commanding 6th Division in Southern Ireland in 1909. Metcalfe retired in 1910.

== Publications ==
- Metcalfe, C.; Ricarde-Seaver, Major F. I. (1889). British Sphere of Influence in South Africa. Fourtnightly Review.

Military offices
Preceded by John Talbot Coke	Commanding British troops in Mauritius; 1902–1909?	Succeeded by
Preceded by Lawrence Parsons	GOC 6th Division; 1909–1910	Succeeded by William Pulteney
