= Lawrence Parsons (British Army officer) =

British Army officer

Lieutenant-General Sir Lawrence Parsons KCB
- Born: Lawrence Worthington Parsons; 23 March 1850; Parsonstown, King's County, Ireland
- Died: 20 August 1923 (aged 73); Hatherton, Reigate, Surrey
- Military career
- Allegiance: United Kingdom
- Branch: British Army
- Service years: 1870–1909; 1914–1916
- Rank: Lieutenant-General
- Commands: 8th Division; 6th Division; 16th (Irish) Division
- Conflicts: Second Boer War; First World War
- Awards: Knight Commander of the Order of the Bath

Lieutenant-General Sir Lawrence Worthington Parsons KCB (23 March 1850 – 20 August 1923) was a British Army officer who became General Officer Commanding 6th Division.

== Military career ==
Parsons was brought up in Parsonstown in King's County, the only son of Lawrence Parsons. He was commissioned into the Royal Artillery as a lieutenant on 23 July 1870, then promoted to captain on 16 September 1880, to major on 1 July 1886, and to lieutenant-colonel on 1 October 1896.

He served in the Second Boer War and took part in the Battle of Colenso, the Battle of Spion Kop and the Relief of Ladysmith, following which he was promoted to substantive colonel on 23 April 1900.

After returning to the United Kingdom, he was in January 1901 appointed Colonel on the Staff Commanding Royal Artillery in the 2nd Army Corps on Salisbury Plain. In early 1903, he was appointed Inspector General of Artillery in India. He was then appointed General Officer Commanding 8th Division in Ireland in November 1906 and General Officer Commanding 6th Division also in Ireland in 1907. He was appointed a Knight Commander of the Order of the Bath in June 1912. On 8 August 1912 he retired from the army.

He was recalled as General Officer Commanding 16th (Irish) Division in September 1914 at the start of the First World War and retired again in 1916.

== Family ==
In 1880, he married Florence Anna Graves, daughter of Dr. Robert Graves of Cloghan Castle, and had one daughter.

Military offices
Preceded by William Knox	GOC 8th Division; 1906–1907	Succeeded by Post disbanded
Preceded by Theodore Stephenson	GOC 6th Division; 1907–1909	Succeeded by Charles Metcalfe
New title	GOC 16th (Irish) Division; 1914−1915	Succeeded by William Hickie
