= 18th Infantry Brigade (United Kingdom) =

Infantry Brigade of the British Army during World War 1 and World War 2

18th Brigade 18th Infantry Brigade
- Active: 1914–1918; 1939–1945
- Country: United Kingdom
- Branch: British Army
- Type: Infantry
- Size: Brigade
- Part of: 6th Division; 1st Armoured Division; 1st Infantry Division
- Engagements: First World War; Second World War

Commanders
- Notable commanders: Sir Walter Congreve

The 18th Infantry Brigade was an infantry brigade of the British Army that saw active service during the First and the Second World Wars.

== History ==
=== First World War ===
The 18th Brigade was formed from a mixture of regular and New Army battalions, and was part of the 6th Division. It saw action on the Western Front.

==== Order of battle ====
Components included:

- 1st Battalion, West Yorkshire Regiment
- 1st Battalion, East Yorkshire Regiment (until November 1915)
- 2nd Battalion, Durham Light Infantry
- 11th (Service) Battalion, Essex Regiment (from 71st Bde. October 1915)
- 2nd Battalion, Sherwood Foresters (to 71st Bde. October 1915)
- 14th (Service) Battalion, Durham Light Infantry (from November 1915, disbanded February 1918)
- 1/16th (County of London) Battalion, London Regiment (until February 1916)
- 18th Machine Gun Company, Machine Gun Corps (formed February 1916, moved to 6th Battalion, Machine Gun Corps 1 March 1918)
- 18th Trench Mortar Battery (formed 16 April 1916)

==== Commanders ====
The following commanded the 18th Infantry Brigade during the First World War:

- Brigadier-General W. N. Congreve (at mobilization)
- Brigadier-General H. S. Ainslie (29 May 1915)
- Lieutenant-Colonel F. W. Towsey (5 August 1915 - acting)
- Brigadier-General R. J. Bridgford (14 August 1915)
- Lieutenant-Colonel C. J. Hobkirk (19 April 1916 - acting)
- Brigadier-General W. K. McClintock (29 April 1916)
- Brigadier-General H. S. Tew (12 June 1916)
- Lieutenant-Colonel A. E. Irvine (16 August 1916 - acting)
- Brigadier-General R. J. Bridgford (19 August 1916)
- Brigadier-General G. S. G. Craufurd (14 September 1917)

=== Second World War ===
The brigade was originally designated as Cairo Area and 18th Infantry Brigade but ceased to exist when in May 1940 it was absorbed by HQ Cairo Sub-Area. On 20 July 1943 the 18th Brigade was reformed again from the redesignation of the 7th Motor Brigade as the 18th Lorried Infantry Brigade. It was part of the 1st Armoured Division and fought in the Italian Campaign with many other different formations, such as the 1st Infantry Division, who they served with in the Battle of Anzio. It was disbanded in Italy on 1 January 1945 due to an acute manpower shortage throughout the British Army at the time with all available replacements being sent to the 21st Army Group in the North West Europe Campaign.

==== Order of battle ====
The original 18th Infantry Brigade was constituted as follows:

- 1st Battalion, Bedfordshire and Hertfordshire Regiment
- 2nd Battalion, Highland Light Infantry
- 1st Battalion, Buffs (Royal East Kent Regiment)
- 2nd Battalion, Scots Guards

From 20 July 1943 the 18th Lorried Infantry Brigade was constituted as follows:

- 1st Battalion, Buffs (Royal East Kent Regiment)
- 2nd Battalion, Rifle Brigade (Prince Consort's Own)
- 9th Battalion, King's Own Yorkshire Light Infantry - formerly the Queen's Own Yorkshire Dragoons
- 14th Battalion, Sherwood Foresters
- 53rd (King's Own Yorkshire Light Infantry) Light Anti-Aircraft Regiment, Royal Artillery – (organised as Infantry)

==== Commanders ====
Commanders included:

- Brigadier O.H. Tidbury
- Brigadier M.D. Erskine
- Brigadier A.D. McKechnie

== Bibliography ==
- Joslen, H. F. (2003) [1960]. Orders of Battle: Second World War, 1939–1945. Uckfield, East Sussex: Naval and Military Press. ISBN 978-1-84342-474-1.
