= Teebus =

- Location within Eastern Cape Location within South Africa
- Coordinates: 31.368°S 25.682°E
- Country: South Africa
- Province: Eastern Cape
- District: Joe Gqabi
- Municipality: Walter Sisulu
- Time zone: UTC+2 (SAST)

Teebus is a village some 18 km south-west of Steynsburg and 35 km north-north-west of Hofmeyr. Afrikaans for 'tea-caddy', this name is taken from that of a pointed hill; to the north of this hill is Koffiebus, 'coffee-caddy'.
