= 6th (UK) Division =

Infantry division of the British Army

6th Division 6th Infantry Division 6th (United Kingdom) Division
- The most recent iteration of the divisional insignia
- Active: 1810–1815; 1899–1900; 1904–1922; 1939–1941; 2008–2011; 2019–2023
- Country: United Kingdom
- Branch: British Army
- Part of: Field Army
- Garrison/HQ: Trenchard Lines, Upavon
- Engagements: Napoleonic War; Peninsula War; Battle of Fuentes de Onoro; Battle of Salamanca; Battle of the Pyrenees; Battle of Orthez; Second Boer War; First World War; First Battle of Ypres; Battle of the Somme; Battle of Cambrai; Battle of Épehy; Irish War of Independence; Second World War; War in Afghanistan
- Website: Official website

Insignia
- c. Second World War

- c. First World War

The 6th (United Kingdom) Division was a division of the British Army, which had been raised and disbanded numerous times as needed over the last 200 years. It was first established by Lieutenant-General Arthur Wellesley in 1810, for service in the Peninsular War (part of the Coalition Wars of the Napoleonic Wars) as part of the Anglo-Portuguese Army. Over the following four years, the division took part in numerous battles and sieges. Notably, on 22 July 1812, the division was heavily engaged during the Battle of Salamanca and suffered the most casualties of any allied formation in that battle. Following the invasion of France, the formation played a prominent role in the 1814 Battle of Toulouse where it assaulted and seized numerous French redoubts protecting the city. While successful, the formation suffered heavy losses from the fighting. This battle marked the end of the Peninsular War and the War of the Sixth Coalition, and the division was broken-up. It was reformed and active for most of the following year, during the War of the Seventh Coalition; held in reserve at the beginning of the Battle of Waterloo, it was committed in the evening to bolster the centre-left of the British line and suffered heavy casualties in the process.

The division also took part in the Second Boer War and the First World War. It was active in the early stages of the Second World War, with its component brigades engaged in various parts of the Mediterranean and Middle East theatre. In the twenty-first century, the division was reformed on 1 February 2008, for Operation Herrick service in the War in Afghanistan. It was disbanded following deployment to Afghanistan as a combined joint task force, in 2011. The division was again reformed, by the renaming of Force Troops Command, in August 2019.

It was disbanded again in 2024, with its units moved to Field Army Troops.

== Napoleonic Wars ==
=== Initial service in the Peninsular War ===
Following the Battle of Bussaco, on 27 September 1810 during the Peninsular War, Arthur Wellesley (later, the duke of Wellington) ordered the Anglo-Portuguese Army to retreat towards the Portuguese capital of Lisbon and the nearby prepared fortifications, the Lines of Torres Vedras. There, they were met by reinforcements that had arrived from other theaters of the Napoleonic Wars (which the Peninsular War formed part of). These troops were used to bring the 5th Division up to strength, and then, on 6 October 1810, Wellesley ordered the formation of the 6th Division with the remainder. Under the command of Major-General Alexander Campbell, the division comprised one brigade of British infantry and one brigade of Portuguese troops that included the Loyal Lusitanian Legion. Minus the Portuguese, the division was 1,948 strong. After serving in the Lines of Torres Vedras, the division took up winter quarters at Alenquer.

During March 1811, the French started to withdraw from Portugal and were followed by the majority of the Anglo-Portuguese Army. After the Battle of Redinha, the division (alongside the 3rd and the Light Divisions) was used as the spearhead of the pursuit after the French. The presence of these three divisions, at the end of the month, intimidated the French into a further withdrawal from Guarda. It then moved to join the Blockade of Almeida and was present at the connected Battle of Fuentes de Oñoro. Now 5,250 strong, it was posted on the flank of the main British force with a deep ravine to its front that hindered any prospect of a French assault. While some ineffective skirmishing took place, the division suffered the loss of just four Portuguese troops. It remained in the vicinity of Almeida until its capture. By September, having moved into Spain, the Anglo-Portuguese Army fought the Battle of El Bodón on 25 September. The same day, to the north of that battleground, the 6th Division engaged in a skirmish with French forces and inflicted 11 dead and captured 37 more, for the loss of 12 of their own. Later in the month, the formation was withdrawn to Beira, Portugal, for winter.

In January 1812, the division (alongside the rest of the army) left winter quarters and marched through heavy snow back into Spain. The division acted as a covering force for the initial part of the campaign, while other parts of the army undertook engagements such as the Siege of Ciudad Rodrigo. In June, the division escorted Wellington as he entered Salamanca. This was followed by an active role in the Siege of the Salamanca forts and criticism of their engineering work, due to a lack of experience in digging siege works. During the siege, the division launched an unsuccessful attack on one fort and lost 126 men, including one brigadier. Following the successful end to the siege, the Anglo-Portuguese Army prepared for an engagement with the main French force in the theater that eventually occurred at the Battle of Salamanca on 22 July. The division formed part of the army's second line behind the 4th Division. When the latter came under heavy attack, the 6th Division moved forward to assist. They fended off French cavalry attacks, halted the main infantry assault, and forced the French to withdraw. The formation advanced after the French but ran into reformed troops, and then engaged in a ferocious prolonged duel until dark descended. The division's final assault was led by the Portuguese brigade, which was unsuccessful and lost 487 men in 15-minutes (including the wounded brigade commander). However, the overall pressure and supporting attacks by other elements of the Anglo-Portuguese Army resulted in a French retreat. The British losses within the division amounted to 1,193, with the formation's overall losses being the highest of any of the Anglo-Portuguese in the battle. While the army then marched towards Madrid, the Spanish capital, the division moved to Cuéllar to be in a position to intercept any French forces that might have moved to interfere. The division was chosen for this task due to its losses, and to also allow for recently arrived sick troops to be assigned to a formation in a secondary area so that they could acclimatize to Spain and not hinder combat operations. The Anglo-Portuguese Army left Madrid in August and linked up with the 6th Division on 3 September. Over the course of the month, the division unsuccessfully attempted to outflank French forces to bring them to battle, before joining the Siege of Burgos. A failed assault soon followed, and the division was allocated a larger role in October although this attack did not materialize. On 21 October, the siege was abandoned, and the army withdrew. By the end of the year, the division was back in winter quarters in Portugal.

=== Invasion of France ===
During 1813, the division was used to guard the army's lines of communication and was based around Medina de Pomar for a time. In June, the formation arrived in the vicinity of Vitoria (but did not take part in the battle) and then took part in the sieges of Pamplona and the siege of San Sebastián (retreating towards Pamplona following the unsuccessful siege of the latter). This was followed by the Battle of Sorauren (part of the larger Battle of the Pyrenees) in July, where it suffered 820 casualties over the two days it was engaged in combat. The division then moved to Navarre, where it and several other formations aimed to deter a French attack while the main body undertook the second siege of San Sebastián. It then took part in the October Battle of the Bidassoa and skirmished with French troops. Success here resulted in the invasion of France and the division spearheaded the advance towards the bridge at Amotz during the Battle of Nivelle. The division forded the Nivelle, then climbed a steep hill to assault the entrenched French positions that protected the bridge. By the time they had made the climb, the 3rd Division had already forced their way across the bridge and the presence of the two formations prompted the French to retreat without much further fighting. During the battle, the division suffered 272 casualties, largely from exposure to artillery fire. The following month, the Nive was crossed at Ustaritz, during the Battle of the Nive. While the main body of the army moved forward to fight the Battle of St. Pierre on 13 December, the division was initially ordered to remain at Ustaritz. After a long march to catch up, it arrived in the rear of the British positions towards the end of the battle and played a minor role in the final stages of the fighting and suffered a mere 33 casualties. This marked the end of fighting for the year.

In February 1814, the army broke winter quarters and the division moved towards Hasparren to be in a position to interdict any French attempts to lift the siege of Bayonne. It then moved to Orthez, and took part in the Battle of Orthez where it suffered 89 losses. On 20 March, near Tarbes, the division outflanked French troops who were engaged by other British forces. However, Wellington ordered an end to the battle before the division could launch an assault. It then marched on Toulouse, skirmished with French forces at various locations en route, and then took part in the April Battle of Toulouse and stormed several redoubts at Mont Rave. While successful, the division suffered 1,515 casualties. This was roughly one third of the formation's strength, which included one battalion that suffered over 50 per cent losses. Meanwhile, Napoleon, Emperor of the French, had abdicated following the capture of Paris on 31 March, which ended the War of the Sixth Coalition. With the war over, the formation was broken up along with the remainder of the army's divisions. The troops marched to Bordeaux, from where they either returned to the UK or were transported to North America to take part in the ongoing War of 1812.

=== Waterloo campaign ===
At the end of the War of the Sixth Coalition, British and Hanoverian troops moved into the Southern Netherlands—previously Austrian Netherlands—as part of an Anglo-Dutch effort to secure the territory while awaiting a political outcome to the war at the Congress of Vienna. On 11 April 1815, after the outbreak of the War of the Seventh Coalition upon Napoleon's return to power and the arrival of allied reinforcements, the force in the Southern Netherlands was reorganised into divisions of the Anglo-Allied Army. The 6th Division was reformed, under the command of Lieutenant-General Galbraith Lowry Cole, and consisted of the British Tenth Brigade and the Hanoverian Fourth Brigade. The latter, while remaining an official part of the division, was attached to the 5th Division and dispatched to take part in the Battle of Quatre Bras and stayed with them during the fighting at Waterloo. The Tenth Brigade remained at Brussels during the initial part of the Waterloo campaign and Cole went on his honeymoon. Around 16/17 June, Major-General John Lambert, commanding the Tenth Brigade and the temporary divisional commander, was ordered to move his formation up to Waterloo. While the brigade consisted of four battalions, the 81st Regiment of Foot (Loyal Lincoln Volunteers) was left behind as a reserve.

The brigade arrived just prior to the battle commencing and became the final reserve of the Anglo-Allied Army. It was initially based behind the Mont-Saint-Jean farm, which was located behind the centre of the army's line, but moved progressively forward as reserves were committed into the battle. During the evening, the French succeeded in capturing La Haye Sainte, an occupied farm complex to the front of the Anglo-Allied centre-left, and then immediately pushed forward skirmishers to attack the British frontline. Under increasing pressure, as French line infantry arrived, additional British reserves were committed including two of the Tenth Brigade's battalions who quickly became heavily engaged. Fearing the French could collapse this part of the line, the brigade's final battalion, the 1st Battalion, 27th (Inniskilling) Regiment of Foot, was ordered forward. They took up a position on the Wavre–Charleroi crossroad, which bisected the Anglo-Allied Army's position, and formed square with the intent that they could engage a French breakthrough on either of their flanks while also supporting the frontline. The 27th came under such heavy fire that they suffered 50 per cent losses within a few minutes, and by the end of the battle had suffered 68 per cent casualties (478 men). Both sides remained heavily engaged, while a key moment of the battle unfolded on the centre-right of the line: the French Imperial Guard assaulted and were repulsed. As the Guard fell back, panic spread among the French infantry, facing the Anglo-Allied centre-left who joined the retreat with the battle ending soon after. The Tenth Brigade's three battalions had a strength of 2,198 at the start of the battle, and suffered 834 casualties including 170 killed over the course of the day.

Following Waterloo, the entire army marched into France and arrived on the outskirts of Paris on 1 July. The war ended a short while later, following the French capitulation. Cole rejoined the division on 7 July. On 30 November, following the signing of the Treaty of Paris, the British force in France was reorganised into the Army of Occupation that consisted of four divisions and did not count the 6th among them.

== Second Boer War ==
The Second Boer War broke out on 11 October 1899, after tensions arose between the British Empire, the South African Republic, and the Orange Free State. In response, the British Government mobilised the three-division strong Natal Field Force in the UK and then dispatched it to reinforce the British military presence in southern Africa. By November, it had been decided that additional troops were needed. The order to form a new 6th Division was given on 2 December 1899, although actual mobilisation did not start until two days later and was completed by the 11th. On formation, the division consisted of the 12th and the 13th Brigades, and had a strength of 8,811 men, 1,287 horses, and 26 artillery pieces. The first elements embarked ships on 16 December and started to arrive at Port Elizabeth on 12 January 1900, while the final dispatch (the division's medical unit) did not leave the UK until 5 January and arrived in Africa on the final day of the month. The division (minus the 12th Brigade, which had been reassigned to other duties after landing) assembled at Teebus during late January, to guard the lines of communication. By 8 February (and having been reinforced with the newly formed 18th Brigade), the division had moved to the "Modder River Camp" (also known as the "Modder Position"), south of Magersfontein and the conflux of the Riet and Modder Rivers, to join the effort to lift the siege of Kimberley.

In mid-February, the 6th Division supported the Cavalry Division during its advance on Kimberley, by occupying captured terrain and keeping the supply lines secure. This included some small-scale clashes with Boer forces. Between 14–15 February, the division's infantry covered 23 mi (37 km) in 24-hours to cross the Modder River at Klip Drift in support of the general advance (in total, the division had covered around 56 mi (90 km) in five days). This move threatened a large body of Boers who were positioned near Magersfontein, which faced the Modder Position and was now outflanked, and facilitated the Cavalry Division's seizure of Kimberley on 15 February. That evening, the Boers (under the command of Piet Cronjé) abandoned Magersfontein and marched east across the frontline and skirted around the 6th Division's positions and linked up with other Boer troops. Louis Creswicke, who wrote about the conflict, described the scene: "One may imagine the midnight picture. The dark immensity of veldt—the dust-driven, sweltering veldt—and Cronje, miles ahead with his horde, the remnant of his convoy, his women and children, fleeing along the north bank of the Modder, harassed by the Sixth Division...". While the majority of the 18th Brigade was left to guard the ford across the Modder, one battalion was dispatched towards Magersfontein to determine if any Boers remained and to capture leftover supplies. The remainder of the division chased the Boer force and skirmished with their retreating rearguard over the course of the 16th and suffered 101 casualties in the process. The pursuit continued the following day, which included an isolated supply convoy from the 13th Brigade being overrun. As additional infantry divisions and the cavalry division joined the pursuit, the Boers ultimately entrenching themselves in a position on the Modder River and the Battle of Paardeberg followed.

By the middle of the year, conventional warfare had ended and the Boers adopted guerrilla warfare tactics. Resultingly, the field divisions were broken up by the end of the year, and the troops were dispersed to garrison towns or to create more mobile forces to counter the new Boer tactics.

== First World War ==
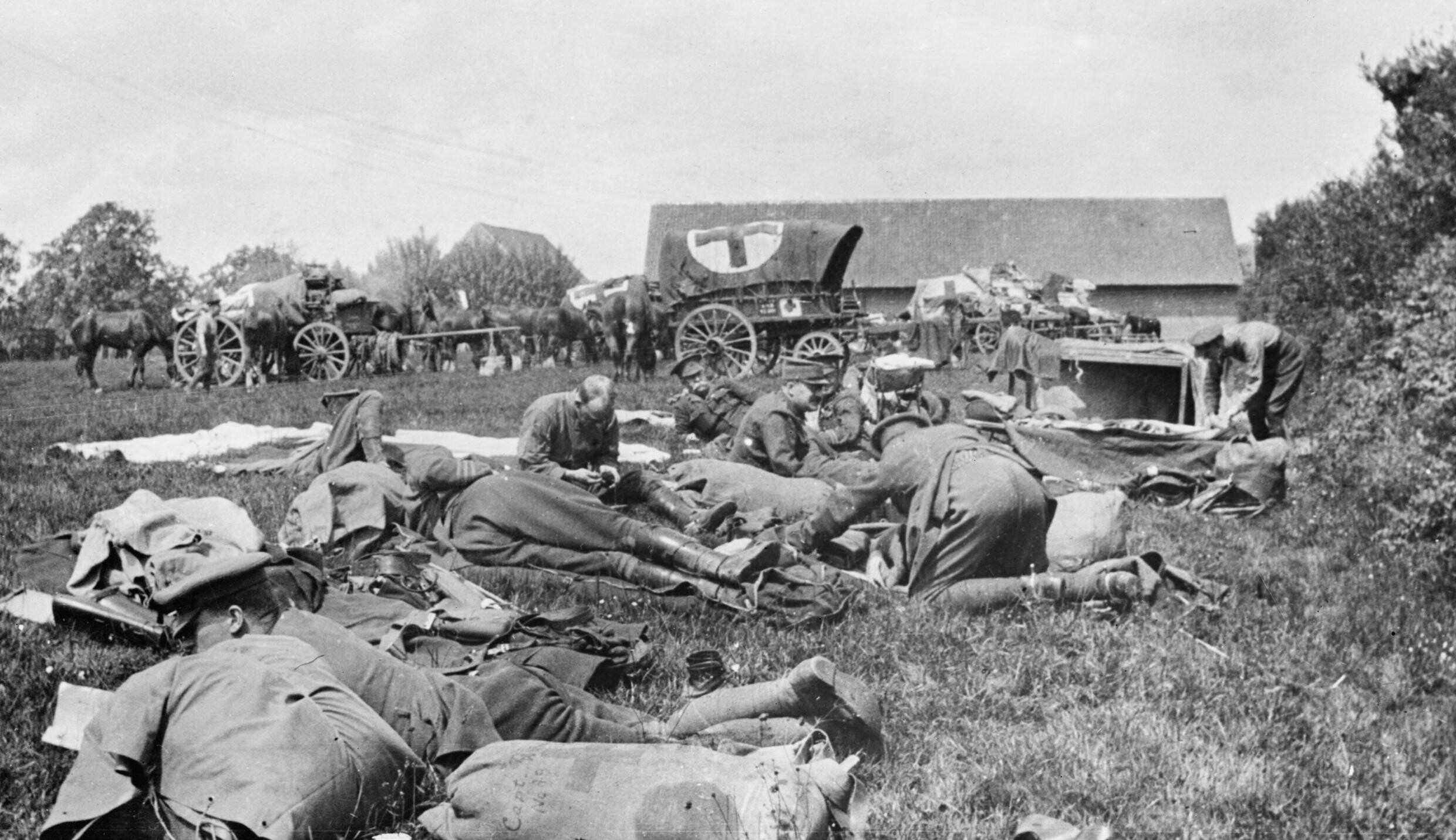
Bivouac of the 18th Field Ambulance near Bailleul during their march from Armentieres to Ypres in May 1915.

The 6th Division was a Regular Army division that was sent to France on 9 September 1914. It served on the Western Front for the duration of the First World War, first seeing action in the First Battle of Ypres as part of III Corps.

In 1915 the division moved into the Ypres Salient to relieve troops that had fought in the Second Battle of Ypres. The Salient was relatively quiet for the rest of the year, except for an attack on the chateau at Hooge on 9 August.

At the end of July 1916 the division was withdrawn, having suffered 11,000 casualties, and in September it was attached to XIV Corps where it joined in the Battle of the Somme by attacking the German fortification known as the Quadrilateral. It captured this area on 18 September. They then participated in the attacks on Morval and Le Transloy before being withdrawn on 20 October and moved into Corps Reserve. Total casualties on the Somme were 277 officers and 6,640 other ranks. In November the division moved to the relatively quiet La Bassée sector, and in March 1917 it went to the Loos sector where it conducted operations and trench raids around Hill 70.

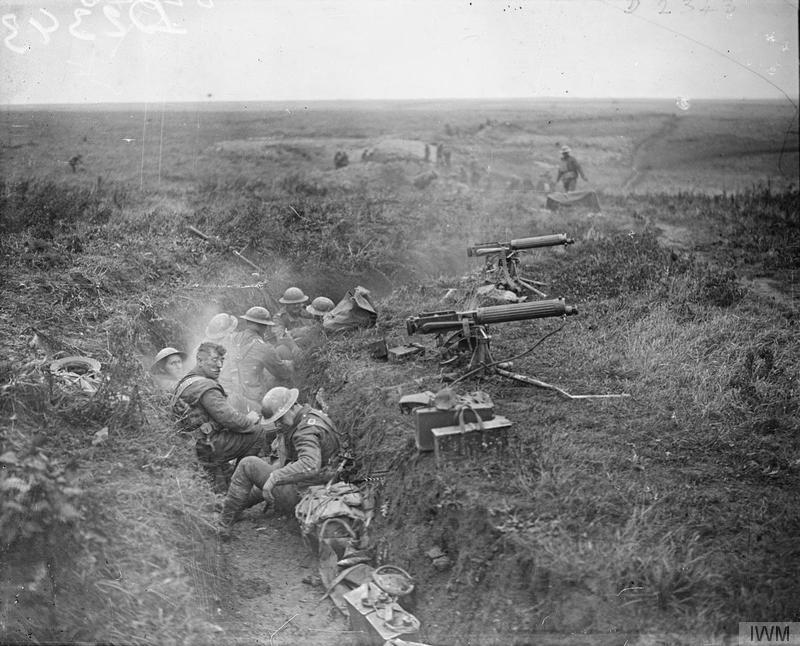
Men of the 11th (Service) Battalion, Leicestershire Regiment, the divisional pioneers, with Vickers machine guns in a captured second line trench at Ribecourt, 20 November 1917.

It was withdrawn on 25 July, shortly before the final assault on the hill. From reserve, it then went to take part in the Battle of Cambrai as part of III Corps. Four days after the battle ended, the division was withdrawn to rest at Basseux. By February 1918 the division was manning the Lagnicourt Sector and was there on 22 March when the Germans launched their Spring Offensive which drove the division back and caused 3,900 casualties out of its 5,000 infantry. On 25 March the division was withdrawn to the Ypres Salient again as part of the Second Army.

By September the division was part of IX Corps and took part in the Battle of Épehy, participating in the general attack on St Quentin and The Quadrilateral (not the same as the position of the same name attacked at the Somme (see above)) that began on 18 September and ended with the Quadrilateral's capture on the 25th.

The division's last two major assaults of the war were in October. On the 8th they captured Bohain and on the 18th they took the high ground overlooking the Sambre–Oise Canal that prepared the way for the Battle of the Sambre.

== Second World War ==
During the Second World War the division did not fight as a complete formation. On 3 November 1939 it was formed in Egypt by the redesignation of the British 7th Infantry Division, under the command of Major-General R.N.O'Connor. On 17 June 1940 Divisional H.Q. became H.Q. Western Desert Force. The Division effectively ceased to exist. The Division reformed in Egypt on 17 February 1941, under the command of Major-General John Evetts. From 7 to 19 April it was temporarily under command of Brigadier C.E.N. Lomax.

On 18 June, when command of the allied forces fighting in the Syria-Lebanon Campaign on the southern front were reorganised, the divisional HQ was placed under Australian I Corps to command the remnants of Gentforce (5th Indian Infantry Brigade and 1st Free French Light Division). Two days later the division was joined from Egypt by 16th Infantry Brigade and on 29 June by 23rd Infantry Brigade. Gentforce force captured Damascus on 21 June. For the rest of the campaign, which ended with the Vichy French surrender on 11 July, the division was engaged with the support of Australian units in attempts to force the Damascus to Beirut road through the Anti-Lebanon Mountains the entrance to which was dominated by the 5,000 feet (1,500 m) high Jebel Mazar. Despite intense efforts Vichy forces maintained control of the position and the main allied effort was switched to the advance on the coast.

On 29 September 1941 Major-General Evetts left and Brigadier G.N.C. Martin took acting command. Eleven days later on 10 October that year it was redesignated the 70th Infantry Division, and Major-General Ronald Scobie assumed command.

== Operation Herrick ==
On 26 July 2007 the Secretary of State for Defence announced that a new 'HQ 6 Division' would reform to direct the International Security Assistance Force's Regional Command South in Afghanistan. Des Browne said 'To meet these temporary demands we have decided to augment the forces' command structure, and will temporarily establish an additional 2-Star deployable HQ. It will be based in York and will be known as HQ 6 Division, with a core of 55 Service personnel, drawn from existing structures. We will keep our planning assumption under review but currently we assess this HQ will be established until 2011.' Major General Jacko Page OBE took command of the new HQ with effect from 1 February 2008.

Headquarters 6th (United Kingdom) Division marked its formation with a parade and flag presentation in York on 5 August 2008. It focused on preparing brigades for Afghanistan and was based at Imphal Barracks, Fulford, York. During summer 2009, the divisional headquarters was significantly reinforced and transformed into Combined Joint Task Force 6 before deploying to Afghanistan as Regional Command South in November 2009. The division headquarters closed in April 2011.

=== Afghanistan War Formation ===
(November 2009)

Regional Command South – Kandahar Airfield

- 3rd Battalion, Royal Regiment of Scotland – regional reserve

Task Force Helmand – British 11th Light Brigade

- The Light Dragoons
- 1st Battalion, Coldstream Guards
- 1st Battalion, Grenadier Guards
- 2nd Battalion, Yorkshire Regiment
- 3rd Battalion, The Rifles
- 3rd Battalion, Guard Hussar Regiment (Danish)

Task Force Kandahar – Canadian 1st Mechanized Brigade Group

- 1st Battalion, Princess Patricia's Canadian Light Infantry
- 1st Battalion, 12th Infantry Regiment (US)

Task Force Leatherneck – US 2nd Marine Expeditionary Brigade

- Regimental Combat Team 7
  - 2nd Light Armored Reconnaissance Battalion
  - 3rd Battalion, 4th Marine Regiment
  - 1st Battalion, 5th Marine Regiment
  - 2nd Battalion, 8th Marine Regiment

Task Force Uruzgan – Dutch 11th Airmobile Brigade

- 17th Battalion, Princess Irene Fusiliers Guards Regiment
- 1st Battalion, Royal Australian Regiment
- Australian Special Operations Task Group

Task Force Zabul – Romanian 2nd Mountain Brigade

- 280th Infantry Battalion

Task Force Stryker – US 5th Brigade Combat Team, 2nd Infantry Division

- 8th Battalion, 1st Cavalry Regiment
- 2nd Battalion, 1st Infantry Regiment
- 1st Battalion, 17th Infantry Regiment
- 4th Battalion, 23rd Infantry Regiment

== Reformation (2019) ==
Force Troops Command was renamed as 6th (United Kingdom) Division on 1 August 2019, and formed up then consisting of 1st Signal Brigade, 11th Signal Brigade, 1st Intelligence Surveillance and Reconnaissance Brigade, 77th Brigade and the Specialised Infantry Group, under the Field Army. In August 2021, the Specialised Infantry Group was redesignated as the Army Special Operations Brigade.

== Structure at disbandment ==
Headquarters, 6th (United Kingdom) Division, at Trenchard Lines, Upavon Station, Wiltshire

=== Army Special Operations Brigade ===
- Army Special Operations Brigade, at St Omer Barracks, Aldershot Garrison
  - 255 Signal Squadron, Royal Corps of Signals, at Swinton Barracks, Perham Down
  - 1st Battalion, Ranger Regiment, at Palace Barracks, Holywood
  - 2nd Battalion, Ranger Regiment, at Keogh Barracks, Mytchett
  - 3rd Battalion, Ranger Regiment, at Elizabeth Barracks, Pirbright Camp
  - 4th Battalion, Ranger Regiment, at New Normandy Barracks, Aldershot Garrison
  - 1 Squadron, Honourable Artillery Company (surveillance and reconnaissance patrols), at Armoury House, Finsbury

=== 77th Brigade ===
- 77th Brigade, at Denison Barracks, Hermitage (moving to Pirbright Camp)
  - Engineer and Logistic Staff Corps
  - Defence Cultural Specialist Unit
  - Task Group
  - Digital Operations Group
  - Operational Media and Communications Group
  - Honourable Artillery Company, at Armoury House, Finsbury

== Disbandment ==
By November 2024, the division was no longer active, having been disbanded and the Army Special Operations Brigade and 77 Brigade moved to Field Army Troops.

== See also ==
- List of commanders of the British 6th Division
- List of wartime orders of battle for the British 6th Division (1810–1941)
- List of British divisions in World War I
- List of British divisions in World War II
