= Battle of Sittimungulum =

Battle of the Third Anglo-Mysore War

- Part of the Third Anglo-Mysore War
Date	13–15 September 1790 (2 days)
Location	Sathyamangalam, India 11.5167°N 77.2500°E
Result	Mysorean victory

Belligerents
Kingdom of Mysore	East India Company

Commanders and leaders
Tipu Sultan	(East India Company) John Floyd

Strength
Unknown	+500

Casualties and losses
Unknown	500

The Battle of Sittimungulum (variant spellings include Sattiamungulum, Sathinungulum, Satyamanagalam) was a series of battles and skirmishes fought between 13 and 15 September 1790, during the Third Anglo-Mysore War, in and near the town now known as Sathyamangalam in the southern part of the Sultanate of Mysore. Forces of Mysore's ruler Tipu Sultan very nearly overwhelmed a British East India Company force under the command of Captain John Floyd.

Tipu "descended the Gajalhatti Pass on 9th September", attacked Floyd and forcing Floyd to retreat to Coimbatore after suffering 500 casualties. However, Tipu lost Burhan-ud-din, "one of his able commanders." Tipu left this front under the command of Kamar-ud Khan, while he dealt with British attacks elsewhere.
