= List of Portuguese Army units of the Napoleonic Wars =

This list shows the regiments the Portuguese Army had during the Napoleonic Wars.

== Infantry Regiments ==
Number	Name	Date of raising or coming onto establishment	Modern Successor
1	Infantry Regiment of Lippe 1763-1806; 1st Infantry Regiment	Raised in 1663	1st Infantry Regiment
2	Infantry Regiment of Lagos 1763-1806; 2nd Infantry Regiment	Raised in 1693	
3	1st Infantry Regiment of Olivença 1763-1806; 3rd Infantry Regiment	Raised in 1641	
4	Infantry Regiment of Freire 1763-1806; 4th Infantry Regiment	Raised in 1659	
5	1st Infantry Regiment of Elvas 1763-1806; 5th Infantry Regiment	Raised in 1641	
6	1st Infantry Regiment Porto 1763-1806; 6th Infantry Regiment	Raised in 1659	
7	Infantry Regiment of Setúbal 1763-1806; 7th Infantry Regiment	Raised in 1668	
8	Infantry Regiment of Castelo de Vide 1763-1806; 8th Infantry Regiment	Raised in 1641	
9	Infantry Regiment of Viana 1763-1806; 9th Infantry Regiment	Raised in 1641	
10	Infantry Regiment of Lisbon 1801-1806; 10th Infantry Regiment	Raised in 1801	
11	Infantry Regiment of Penamacor 1763-1806; 11th Infantry Regiment	Raised in 1643	
12	Infantry Regiment of Chaves 1763-1806; 12th Infantry Regiment	Raised in 1643	19th Infantry Regiment
13	1st Infantry Regiment of Peniche 1763-1806; 13th Infantry Regiment	Raised in 1659	13th Infantry Regiment
14	Infantry Regiment of Tavira 1763-1806; 14th Infantry Regiment	Raised in 1657	
15	2nd Infantry Regiment of Olivença 1763-1806; 15th Infantry Regiment	Raised in 1641	15th Infantry Regiment
16	1st Infantry Regiment of Vieira Teles 1763-1806; 16th Infantry Regiment	Raised in 1668	
17	2nd Infantry Regiment of Setúbal 1763-1806; 17th Infantry Regiment	Raised in 1641	
18	2nd Infantry Regiment of Porto 1763-1806; 18th Infantry Regiment	Raised in 1659	
19	Infantry Regiment of Cascais 1763-1806; 19th Infantry Regiment	Raised in 1641	
20	Infantry Regiment of Campo Maior 1801-1806; 20th Infantry Regiment	Raised in 1841	
21	Infantry Regiment of Valença 1763-1806; 21st Infantry Regiment	Raised in 1657	
22	Infantry Regiment of Serpa 1763-1806; 22nd Infantry Regiment	Raised in 1641	
23	1st Infantry Regiment of Almeida 1763-1806; 23rd Infantry Regiment	Raised in 1641	
24	Infantry Regiment of Bragança 1763-1806; 24th Infantry Regiment	Raised in 1664	19th Infantry Regiment

== Cavalry Regiments ==
Number	Name	Date of raising or coming onto establishment	Successor 2014
1	Cavalry Regiment of Alcântara 1707-1806; 1st Cavalry Regiment	Raised in 1707	
2	Cavalry Regiment of Moura 1715-1806; 2nd Cavalry Regiment	Raised in 1715	
3	Cavalry Regiment of Olivença 1715-1806; 3rd Cavalry Regiment	Raised in 1715	3rd Cavalry Regiment
4	Cavalry Regiment of Meclemburgo 1762-1806; 4th Cavalry Regiment	Raised in 1762	4th Cavalry Regiment
5	Cavalry Regiment of Évora 1715-1806; 5th Cavalry Regiment	Raised in 1715	
6	Cavalry Regiment Bragança 1715-1806; 6th Cavalry Regiment	Raised in 1715	6th Cavalry Regiment
7	Cavalry Regiment of Cais 1707-1806; 7th Cavalry Regiment	Raised in 1707	
8	Cavalry Regiment of Elvas 1715-1806; 8th Cavalry Regiment	Raised in 1715	
9	Cavalry Regiment of Chaves 1715-1806; 9th Cavalry Regiment	Raised in 1715	
10	Cavalry Regiment of Santarém 1707-1806; 10th Cavalry Regiment	Raised in 1707	
11	Cavalry Regiment of Almeida 1707-1806; 11th Cavalry Regiment	Raised in 1707	
12	Cavalry Regiment of Miranda 1763-1806; 12th Cavalry Regiment	Raised in 1743	

== Artillery Regiments ==
Number	Name	Date of raising or coming onto establishment	Successor 2014
1	Artillery Regiment of the Court 1763-1806; 1st Artillery Regiment	Raised in 1677	
2	Artillery Regiment of Algarve 1774-1806; 2nd Artillery Regiment	Raised in 1718	
3	Artillery Regiment of Alentejo 1708-1806; 3rd Artillery Regiment	Raised in 1708	
4	Artillery Regiment of Porto 1763-1806; 4th Artillery Regiment	Raised in 1763	5th Artillery Regiment
5	Artillery Regiment of the Army 1791-1797; Artillery Regiment of the Navy	Raised in 1791	

== Caçador Battalions ==
Number	Name	Date of raising or coming onto establishment	Successor 2014
1	Regiment of Volunteers of Portalegre 1808; 1st Caçador Battalion	Raised in 1808	
2	Transtagana Legion 1808; 2nd Caçador Battalion	Raised in 1808	
3	Caçador Company of Vila Real 1808; 3rd Caçador Battalion	Raised in 1801	
4	Caçador Battalion of Beira 1808; 4th Caçador Battalion	Raised in 1808	
5	Transtagana Legion 1808; 5th Caçador Battalion	Raised in 1808	
6	Caçador Battalion of Porto 1808; 6th Caçador Battalion	Raised in 1808	
7	1st Battalion of Loyal Lusitanian Legion 1809-1811; 7th Caçador Battalion	Raised in 1809	
8	2nd Battalion of Loyal Lusitanian Legion 1809-1811; 8th Caçador Battalion	Raised in 1809	
9	Remnants of the Loyal Lusitanian Legion 1809-1811; 9th Caçador Battalion	Raised in 1809	
10	Caçador Battalion of Aveiro 1811; 10th Caçador Battalion	Raised in 1811	
11	Caçador Battalion of Feira 1811; 11th Caçador Battalion	Raised in 1811	
12	Caçador Battalion of Ponte de Lima 1811; 12th Caçador Battalion	Raised in 1811	

== Sources ==
- "Regimento de Infantaria n.ª 1". Arqnet.pt.
- "Regimento de Infantaria n.ª 2". Arqnet.pt.
- "Regimento de Infantaria n.ª 3". Arqnet.pt.
- "Regimento de Infantaria n.ª 4". Arqnet.pt.
- "Regimento de Infantaria n.ª 5". Arqnet.pt.
- "Regimento de Infantaria n.ª 6". Arqnet.pt.
- "Regimento de Infantaria n.ª 7". Arqnet.pt.
- "Regimento de Infantaria n.ª 8". Arqnet.pt.
- "Regimento de Infantaria n.ª 9". Arqnet.pt.
- "Regimento de Infantaria n.ª 10". Arqnet.pt.
- "Regimento de Infantaria n.ª 11". Arqnet.pt.
- "Regimento de Infantaria n.ª 12". Arqnet.pt.
- "Regimento de Infantaria n.ª 13". Arqnet.pt.
- "Regimento de Infantaria n.ª 14". Arqnet.pt.
- "Regimento de Infantaria n.ª 15". Arqnet.pt.
- "Regimento de Infantaria n.ª 16". Arqnet.pt.
- "Regimento de Infantaria n.ª 17". Arqnet.pt.
- "Regimento de Infantaria n.ª 18". Arqnet.pt.
- "Regimento de Infantaria n.ª 19". Arqnet.pt.
- "Regimento de Infantaria n.ª 21". Arqnet.pt.
- "Regimento de Infantaria n.ª 22". Arqnet.pt.
- "Regimento de Infantaria n.ª 23". Arqnet.pt.
- "Regimento de Infantaria n.ª 24". Arqnet.pt.
- "Regimento de Cavalaria n.ª 1". Arqnet.pt.
- "Regimento de Cavalaria n.ª 2". Arqnet.pt.
- "Regimento de Cavalaria n.ª 3". Arqnet.pt.
- "Regimento de Cavalaria n.ª 4". Arqnet.pt.
- "Regimento de Cavalaria n.ª 5". Arqnet.pt.
- "Regimento de Cavalaria n.ª 6". Arqnet.pt.
- "Regimento de Cavalaria n.ª 7". Arqnet.pt.
- "Regimento de Cavalaria n.ª 8". Arqnet.pt.
- "Regimento de Cavalaria n.ª 9". Arqnet.pt.
- "Regimento de Cavalaria n.ª 10". Arqnet.pt.
- "Regimento de Cavalaria n.ª 11". Arqnet.pt.
- "Regimento de Cavalaria n.ª 12". Arqnet.pt.
- "Regimento de Artilharia n.ª 1". Arqnet.pt.
- "Regimento de Artilharia n.ª 2". Arqnet.pt.
- "Regimento de Artilharia n.ª 3". Arqnet.pt.
- "Regimento de Artilharia n.ª 4". Arqnet.pt.
- "Regimento de Artilharia da Marinha". Arqnet.pt.
- "Batalhão de Caçadores n.ª 1". Arqnet.pt.
- "Regimento de Caçadores n.ª 2". Arqnet.pt.
- "Regimento de Caçadores n.ª 3". Arqnet.pt.
- "Regimento de Caçadores n.ª 4". Arqnet.pt.
- "Regimento de Caçadores n.ª 5". Arqnet.pt.
- "Regimento de Caçadores n.ª 6". Arqnet.pt.
- "Regimento de Caçadores n.ª 7". Arqnet.pt.
- "Regimento de Caçadores n.ª 8". Arqnet.pt.
- "Regimento de Caçadores n.ª 9". Arqnet.pt.
- "Regimento de Caçadores n.ª 10". Arqnet.pt.
- "Regimento de Caçadores n.ª 11". Arqnet.pt.
- "Regimento de Caçadores n.ª 12". Arqnet.pt.
