= Battle of Łabiszyn =

- Part of Kościuszko Uprising
Date	28–29 September 1794
Location	Łabiszyn, South Prussia, Kingdom of Prussia (now part of Poland) 52°57′11″N 17°55′10″E
Result	Polish–Lithuanian victory

Belligerents
Poland–Lithuania	Kingdom of Prussia

Commanders and leaders
Jan Henryk Dąbrowski	(Kingdom of Prussia) Johann Friedrich Székely

Strength
~7,000 soldiers (Note: About 4,000 (3,100 men and Madaliński's cavalry brigade) line troops, 16 cannons, about 3,000 insurgents.)	~1,000 soldiers (Note: Value estimated taking into account incomplete personnel numbers.)

Casualties and losses
~250	~350

The Battle of Łabiszyn took place during the Kościuszko Uprising, on the night of 28 and 29 September 1794, between Polish–Lithuanian insurgents commanded by General Jan Henryk Dąbrowski and Prussian troops commanded by Colonel Johann Friedrich Székely, ending in victory for the Poles. It was fought on a hill near Łabiszyn, in South Prussia, Kingdom of Prussia (now part of Poland).

== History ==
During his expedition to Greater Poland, General Dąbrowski decided to concentrate his troops in Gniezno, where he arrived on 27 September 1794. His force of about 7,000 men consisted of Dąbrowski's division and the Greater Poland insurgents, an army composed mainly of recruits and inexperienced soldiers. With his forces too weak to take Poznań, he decided to feign a march in that direction, and in the meantime destroy Colonel Székely's pacification unit, consisting of a battalion of fusiliers and 3 hussar squadrons, which was standing in Inowrocław and threatening the communication lines of the Polish troops in Greater Poland with Warsaw.

In order to reassure the Prussian command of the purpose of the attack, Dąbrowski sent two cavalry squadrons under the command of Major Stanisław Bielamowski to the vicinity of Poznań. Fearing this attack, the Prussians, with the exception of Székely, halted all offensive actions by preparing a defence, but the withdrawal of Prince Józef Poniatowski's corps from other side of the Bzura river, broke Dąbrowski's communication with the rest of the insurgent army.

To carry out his plan, Dąbrowski divided the corps into three columns: the right, consisting of Antoni Madaliński's brigade, 100 riflemen and 2 guns, was to move through Trzemeszno, Mogilno and Inowrocław to Łabiszyn. The middle one, made up of the rest of the regular troops, under Dąbrowski's command was to move from Gniezno to Rogów, Żnin and on to Łabiszyn, while the left one, made up of insurgent troops under Józef Lipski's command, was also to reach Łabiszyn via Kłecko and Żnin. The first to appear at the rallying point was Madaliński, who disarmed the local unit, but Székely's main forces were then marching from Inowrocław to Nowa Wieś. On the night of 28-29 September, Dąbrowski's and Madaliński's combined columns in Łabiszyn came under fire from Prussian artillery, but once the confusion was under control, a counterattack was led which ended in a bayonet clash at a hill near the monastery, and a cavalry charge led by Dąbrowski himself. After this clash, Székely withdrew behind the Brda river, setting up his headquarters in Bydgoszcz.

== Commemoration ==
A hill where the battle took place is now known as Székely Mountain (Polish: Góra Szekelego), commemorating the events.
