= Greater Poland Uprising (1794) =

Armed uprising of the Polish population

Greater Poland Uprising of 1794
- Part of Kościuszko Uprising
Date	August–December 1794
Location	Greater Poland
Result	Prussian victory

Belligerents
Kingdom of Prussia	Poland–Lithuania

Commanders and leaders
(Kingdom of Prussia) Frederick William II (Kingdom of Prussia) Johann Friedrich Székely †	Jan Dąbrowski; Antoni Madaliński

The 1794 Greater Poland Uprising (Polish: Powstanie wielkopolskie 1794 roku) was a military insurrection by Poles in Wielkopolska (Greater Poland) against Kingdom of Prussia which had taken possession of this territory after the 1793 Second Partition of the Polish–Lithuanian Commonwealth.

== Origins ==
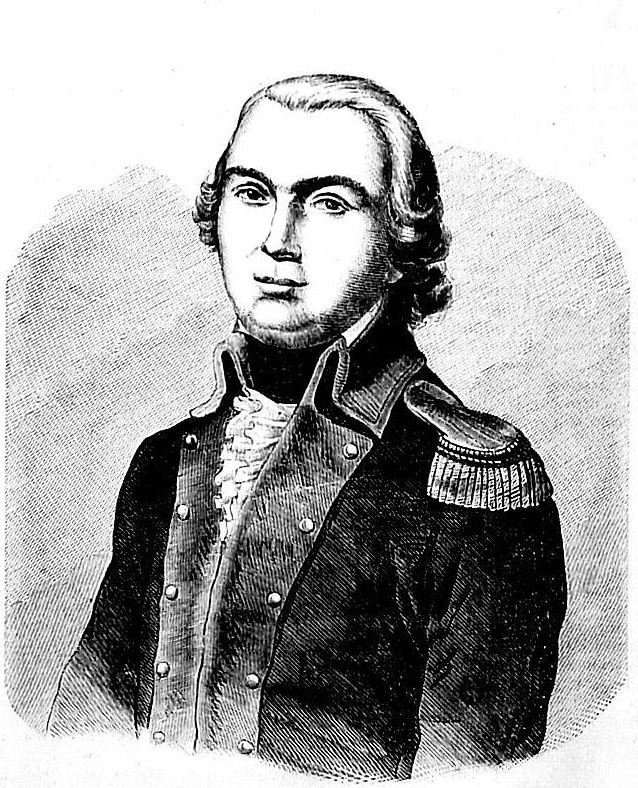
Józef Niemojewski, leader of the uprising

The outbreak of Kościuszko Uprising in central Poland in March 1794 served as the spark for the formation of Polish military units in the Prussian partition, as Poles in Wielkopolska hoped to liberate their region. Initially, Tadeusz Kościuszko, who had initiated the fight against Russians in central Poland did not want to support the Greater Poland Uprising in the hope of avoiding a two front war (at the time, Kingdom of Prussia was nominally in an alliance with Poland against Russia). As a result, the planned insurrection in Wielkopolska almost ended before it could start. However, the situation changed in June 1794 when the Prussians declared their support for Tsarist Russia and offered them military support in suppressing Kościuszko (after his victory at the Battle of Racławice). As a result, the Supreme National Council issued a proclamation To the Citizens of Greater Poland calling them to arms.

== Rebellion ==
The initial center of the uprising was the Kujawy region. The command was given to Józef Niemojewski, although many of the units in the field operated independently. Initial clashes took place on 20 August. On 22 August the insurrectionists took Gniezno and General Paweł Skórzewski took Konin and other towns in the area soon after. As a result, the King of Prussia, Frederick William II was forced to withdraw some of his forces from central Poland which were besieging Warsaw.

A Polish corps under Jan Henryk Dąbrowski captured Bydgoszcz on 2 October and entered Pomerania almost unopposed. Dąbrowski planned to winter in Bydgoszcz and then move through Toruń, but because of Kościuszko's defeat at the Battle of Maciejowice he decided instead to evacuate Wielkopolska and make his way into central Poland. Although thanks to the mobility of his forces he evaded being encircled by a much less mobile Prussian army, the Prussians recaptured most of the gains made by the insurrectionists in the previous few months.

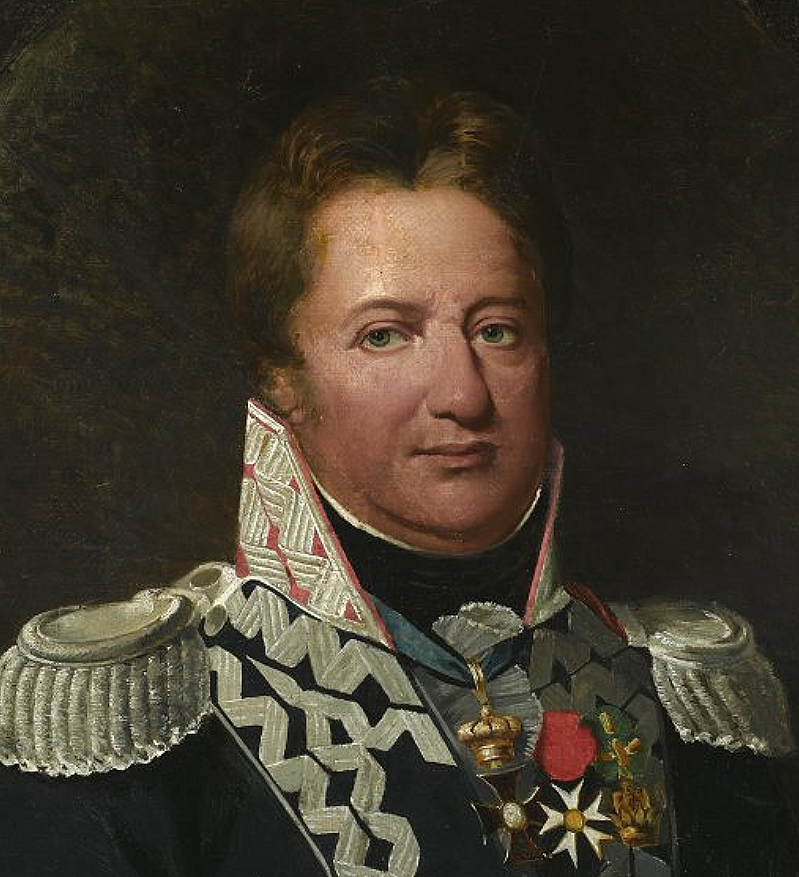
General Jan Henryk Dąbrowski, one of the leaders of the uprising

Dąbrowski unsuccessfully tried to convince Kościuszko's successor, Tomasz Wawrzecki to move the insurrection from central Poland to the Prussian partition. On 17 November 1794, the last Polish units in central Poland capitulated to the Russians at Radoszyce. In Wielkopolska sporadic guerrilla fighting continued until mid-December. The uprising almost got a second life when a hero of the fighting in Warsaw and one of Kościuszko's colonels, the shoemaker Jan Kiliński (who had been born in Trzemeszno), arrived in Wielkopolska to try to reorganize the Polish forces. However, he was soon captured by the Prussians and handed over to the Russians.

With the end of the uprising, Dąbrowski was offered commissions in the Russian and Prussian armies but turned these down and emigrated abroad. He went on to organize the Polish Legions in Italy which fought alongside Napoleon in subsequent wars. Niemojewski also emigrated to France and served in Napoleon's army where he eventually attained the rank of Brigadier General.
