= Kościuszko Uprising =

1794 Polish–Lithuanian uprising against Russia and Prussia

- Part of the Polish–Russian Wars
- Map of the Kościuszko Uprising, 1794
Date	12 March – December 1794
Location	Polish–Lithuanian Commonwealth; Prussian Partition (Greater Poland and Kuyavia (Note: see Greater Poland Uprising (1794))); Russian Partition
Result	Russo-Prussian victory
Territorial changes	Dissolution of the Polish–Lithuanian Commonwealth (Third Partition of Poland)

Belligerents
Poland–Lithuania; • Kościuszko Insurgents	Russian Empire; Kingdom of Prussia; Holy Roman Empire (Habsburg Monarchy) (Note: They did not participate in active hostilities.); Duchy of Courland and Semigallia

Commanders and leaders
Tadeusz Kościuszko (POW) (Note: He served as the Supreme Head of the National Armed Forces (dictator of the uprising) from the outbreak of the uprising until 12 October 1794, 'de facto' until 10 October 1794, when he was captured during the battle of Maciejowice); Antoni Madaliński; Jakub Jasiński †; Tomasz Wawrzecki (Note: He assumed the position of Supreme Chief National Armed Forces (dictator of the uprising) on October 12th 1794 after the capture of Tadeusz Kościuszko after the battle of Maciejowice, when the Supreme National Council proclaimed him the head of the uprising); Stanisław Mokronowski; Józef Zajączek; Józef Bielak; Antoni Chlewiński; Jan Dąbrowski; Michał Wielhorski; Józef Poniatowski; Stefan Grabowski (surrendered); Eustachy Sanguszko; Romuald Giedroyć	Alexander Suvorov; Nikolai Repnin (Note: General en chef of Russian troops on Lithuania, head of the entire action against the uprising from May 3, 1794); Ivan Saltykov (Note: General en chef of Russian troops in Ukraine); Osip Igelström (Note: General en chef of Russian troops in Crown); Wilhelm Derfelden; Pavel Tsitsianov; Alexander Tormasov; Pyotr Bagration; Valerian Zubov; Levin Bennigsen; Friedrich Buxhöwden; Ivan Fersen; Friedrich Wilhelm; Johann Yorck; Johann Székely †

Units involved
Military of the Polish–Lithuanian Commonwealth	(Russian Empire) Russian Army (Kingdom of Prussia) Prussian Army

Strength
Unknown	(Russian Empire) 60,000 (in Sept.) (Kingdom of Prussia) 53,000

Casualties and losses
Total: 32,877; 15,431 killed 9,846 wounded 7,500 captured 100 missing	Total: 17,971; 9,812 killed 5,761 wounded 2,399 captured

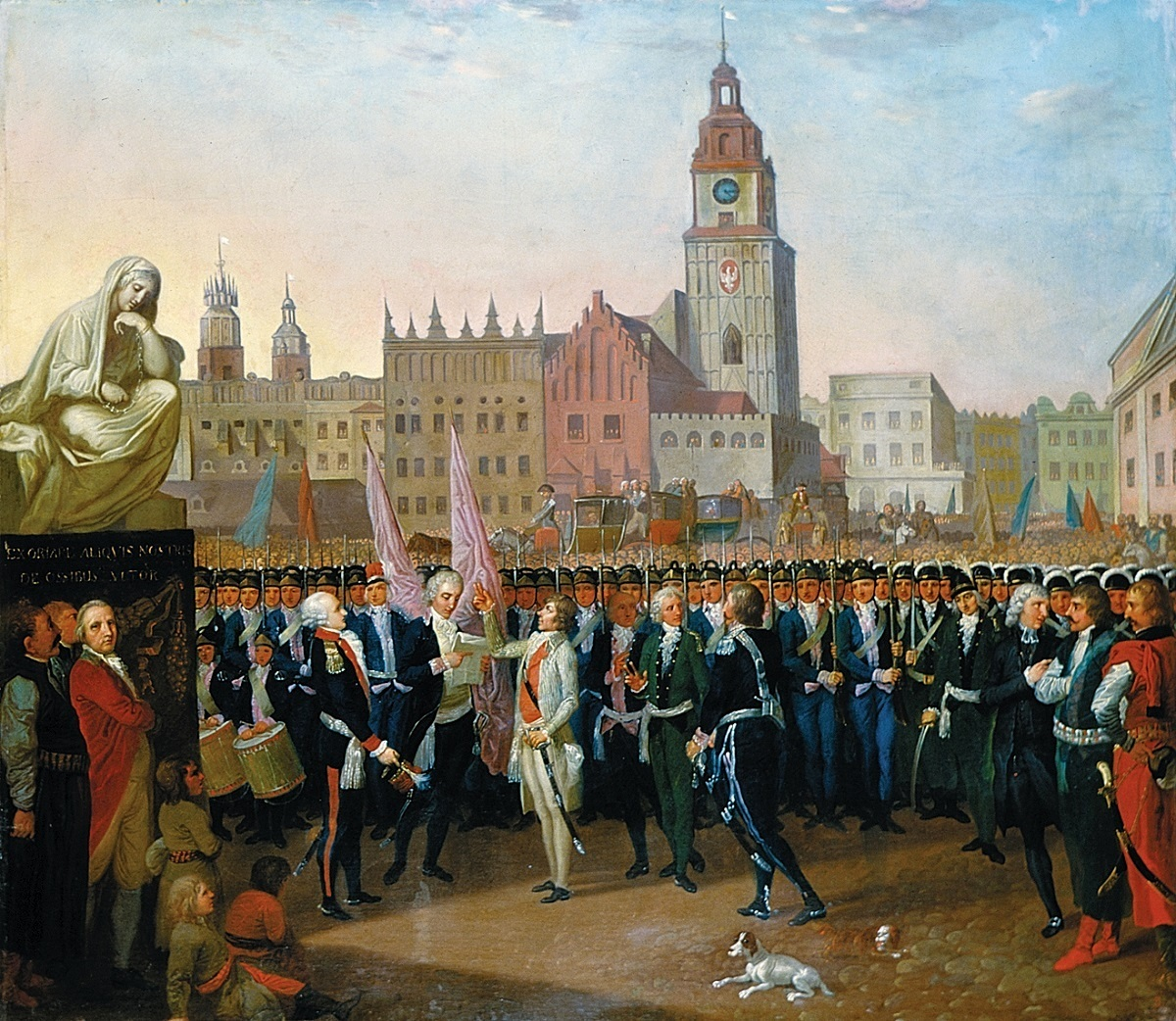
Tadeusz Kościuszko taking the oath, 24th March 1794

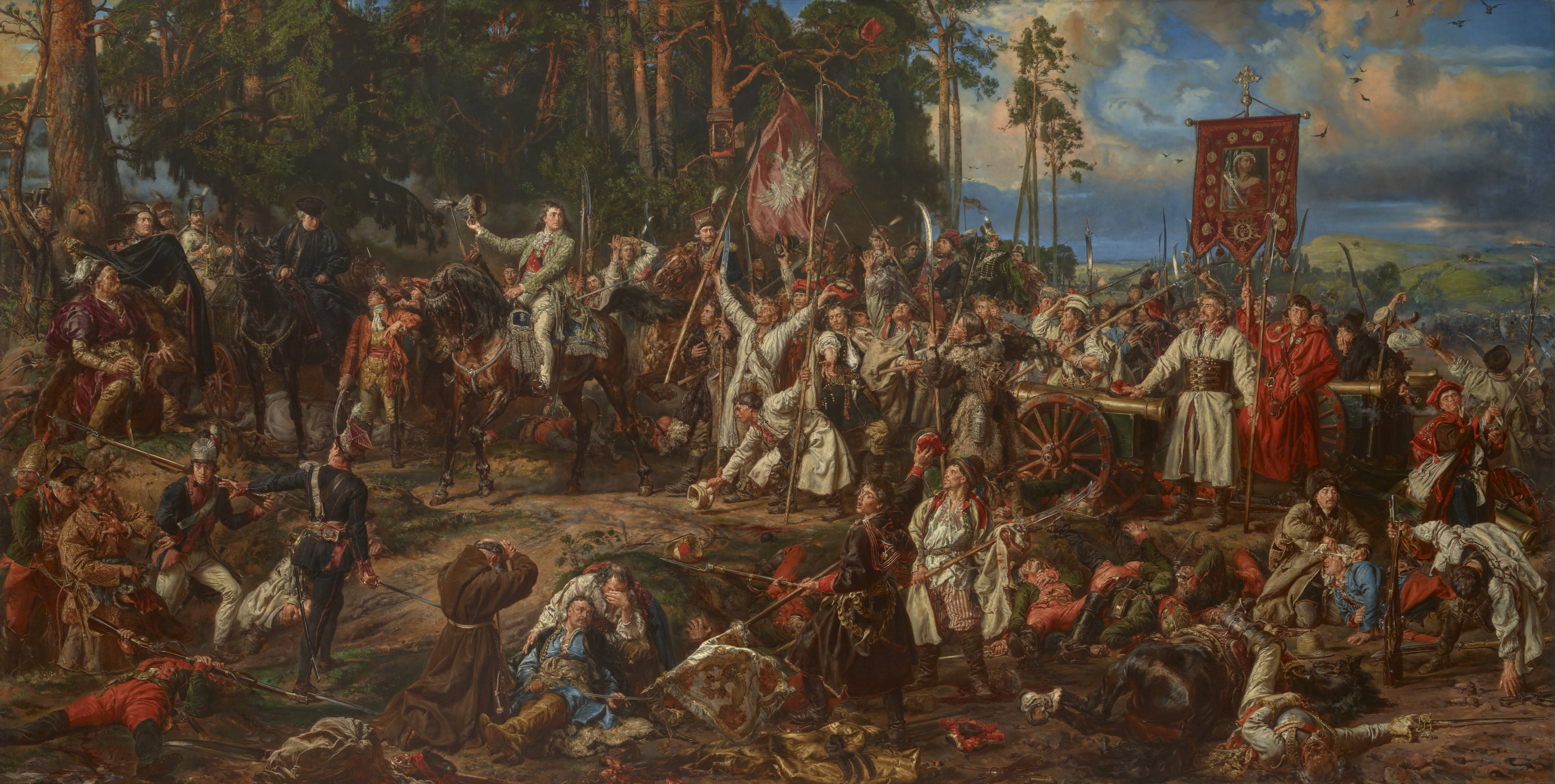
Battle of Racławice, Jan Matejko, oil on canvas, 1888, National Museum in Kraków. 4 April 1794

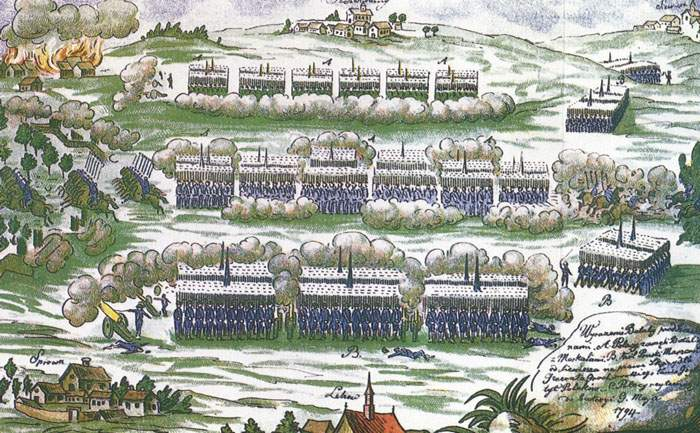
Battle of Szczekociny, 1794 by Michał Stachowicz

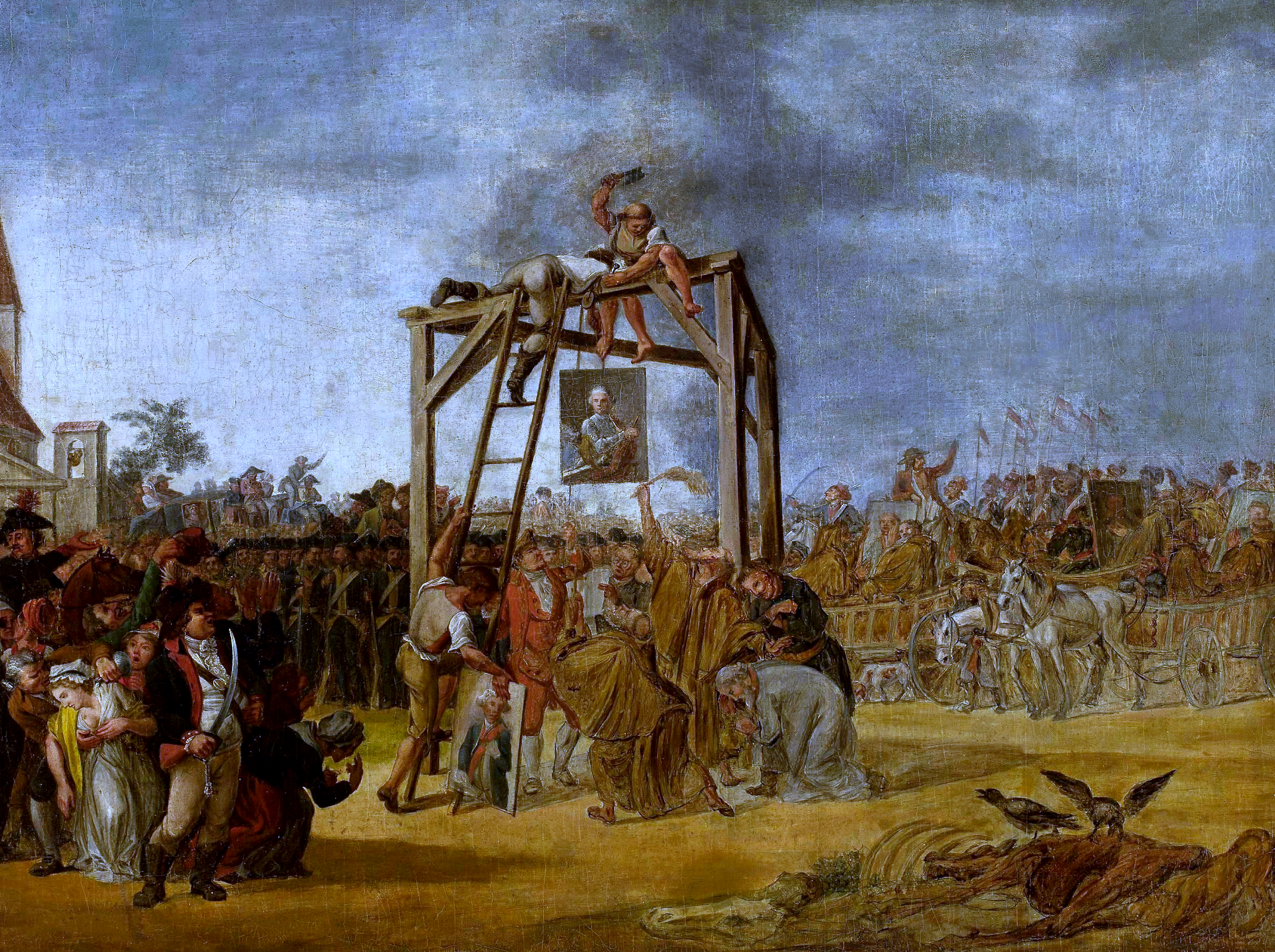
Hanging traitors in effigy, painting by Jean Pierre Norblin de la Gourdaine

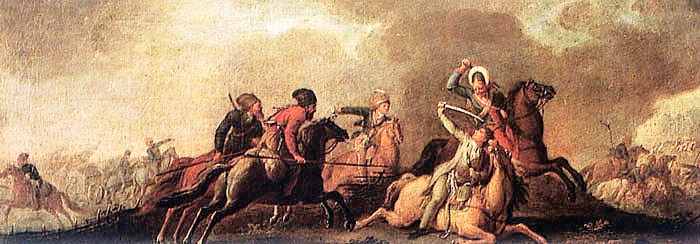
Kościuszko at Maciejowice 1794, by Jan Bogumił Plersch. Kościuszko was wounded and taken captive.

The Kościuszko Uprising, (Note: Polish: insurekcja kościuszkowska, powstanie kościuszkowskie; Russian: Восстание Костюшко; German: Kościuszko-Aufstand) also known as the Polish Uprising of 1794, (Note: Polish: rewolucja polska 1794 roku; Russian: Польское восстание 1794) Second Polish War, (Note: Russian: Вторая польская война) Polish Campaign of 1794, (Note: Russian: Польская кампания 1794 года) and the Polish Revolution of 1794, (Note: Russian: Польская революция 1794 года) was an uprising against the Russian and Prussian influence on the Polish–Lithuanian Commonwealth, led by Tadeusz Kościuszko in Poland–Lithuania and the Prussian partition in 1794. It was an attempt to liberate the Polish–Lithuanian Commonwealth from external influence after the Second Partition of Poland (1793) and the creation of the Targowica Confederation. Despite some local successes of the insurgency, it was ultimately suppressed by Russian general Alexander Suvorov, who was promoted to field marshal in the aftermath of the decisive Battle of Praga; the massacre that followed the battle was evidence of the ruthlessness of war.

== Background ==
=== Decline of the Commonwealth ===
By the early 18th century, the magnates of Poland and Lithuania controlled the state – or rather, they managed to ensure that no reforms would be carried out that might weaken their privileged status (the "Golden Freedoms"). Through the abuse of the liberum veto rule which enabled any deputy to paralyze the Sejm (Commonwealth's parliament) proceedings, deputies bribed by magnates or foreign powers or those simply content to believe they were living in an unprecedented "Golden Age", paralysed the Commonwealth's government for over a century.

The idea of reforming the Commonwealth gained traction starting from the mid-17th century. It was, however, viewed with suspicion not only by its magnates but also by neighboring countries, which were content with the deterioration of the Commonwealth and abhorred the thought of a resurgent and democratic power on their borders. With the Commonwealth Army reduced to around 16,000, it was easy for its neighbors to intervene directly (The Imperial Russian Army numbered 300,000; The Prussian Army and Imperial Austrian Army, 200,000 each).

=== Attempts at reform ===
A major opportunity for reform presented itself during the "Great Sejm" of 1788–1792. Poland's neighbors were preoccupied with wars and unable to intervene forcibly in Polish affairs. Russia and Austria were engaged in hostilities with the Ottoman Empire (the Russo-Turkish War, 1787–1792 and the Austro-Turkish War, 1787–1791); the Russians also found themselves simultaneously fighting in the Russo-Swedish War, 1788–1790. A new alliance between the Polish–Lithuanian Commonwealth and Prussia seemed to provide security against Russian intervention, and on 3 May 1791 the new constitution was read and adopted to overwhelming popular support.

With the wars between Turkey and Russia and Sweden and Russia having ended, Empress Catherine was furious over the adoption of the new constitution, which she believed threatened Russian influence in Poland. Russia had viewed Poland as a de facto protectorate. "The worst possible news has arrived from Warsaw: the Polish king has become almost sovereign" was the reaction of one of Russia's chief foreign policy authors, Alexander Bezborodko, when he learned of the new constitution. Prussia was also strongly opposed to the new constitution, and Polish diplomats received a note that the new constitution changed the Polish state so much that Prussia did not consider its obligations binding. Just like Russia, Prussia was concerned that the newly strengthened Polish state could become a threat and the Prussian foreign minister, Friedrich Wilhelm von Schulenburg-Kehnert, clearly and with rare candor told the Poles that Prussia did not support the constitution and refused to help the Commonwealth in any form, even as a mediator, as it was not in Prussia's state interest to see the Commonwealth strengthened as it could threaten Prussia in the future. The Prussian statesman Ewald von Hertzberg expressed the fears of European conservatives: "The Poles have given the coup de grâce to the Prussian monarchy by voting a constitution", elaborating that a strong Commonwealth would likely demand the return of the lands Prussia acquired in the First Partition.

=== Second Partition of Poland ===
The Constitution was not adopted without dissent in the Commonwealth itself, either. Magnates who had opposed the constitution draft from the start, namely Franciszek Ksawery Branicki, Stanisław Szczęsny Potocki, Seweryn Rzewuski, and Szymon and Józef Kossakowski, asked Tsaritsa Catherine to intervene and restore their privileges such as the Russian-guaranteed Cardinal Laws abolished under the new statute. To that end these magnates formed the Targowica Confederation. The Confederation's proclamation, prepared in St. Petersburg in January 1792, criticized the constitution for contributing to, in their own words, "contagion of democratic ideas" following "the fatal examples set in Paris". It asserted that "The parliament ... has broken all fundamental laws, swept away all liberties of the gentry and on the third of May 1791 turned into a revolution and a conspiracy." The Confederates declared an intention to overcome this revolution. We "can do nothing but turn trustingly to Tsarina Catherine, a distinguished and fair empress, our neighboring friend and ally", who "respects the nation's need for well-being and always offers it a helping hand", they wrote. The Confederates aligned with Catherine and asked her for military intervention. On 18 May 1792 the Russian ambassador to Poland, Yakov Bulgakov, delivered a declaration of war to Polish Foreign Minister Joachim Chreptowicz. Russian armies entered Poland and Lithuania on the same day, starting the Polish–Russian War of 1792. The war ended without any decisive battles, with a capitulation signed by Polish King Stanisław August Poniatowski, who hoped that a diplomatic compromise could be worked out.

King Poniatowski's hopes that the capitulation would allow an acceptable diplomatic solution to be worked out were soon dashed. With new deputies bribed or intimidated by the Russian troops, a new session of parliament, known as the Grodno Sejm, took place, in fall 1793. On 23 November 1793, it concluded its deliberations under duress, annulling the constitution and acceding to the Second Partition. Russia took 250,000 square kilometres (97,000 sq mi), while Prussia took 58,000 square kilometres (22,000 sq mi) of the Commonwealth's territory. This event reduced Poland's population to only one-third of what it was before the partitions began in 1772, and its independence was also strongly curtailed. Russian Empire was granted the right to have bases in Poland and the right to move forces through Polish territory at will. Poland was not to sign any alliances without Russian approval and to have sent diplomatic missions to foreign countries only together with Russians ones Such an outcome was a giant blow for the members of the Targowica Confederation, who saw their actions as a defense of the centuries-old privileges of the magnates, but now were regarded by the majority of the Polish population as traitors.

=== Growing unrest ===
The Polish military was widely dissatisfied with the capitulation, most commanders considering it premature; Tadeusz Kościuszko, Prince Józef Poniatowski and many others would criticize the king's decision and many, including Kościuszko, resigned their commission shortly afterward. After the Commonwealth defeat in the war and the rescinding of the Constitution, the Army was reduced to about 36,000. In 1794 Russians demanded a further downsizing of the army to 15,000. The dissent in the Polish Army was one of the sparks that would lead to the coming conflict.

The King's capitulation was a hard blow for Kościuszko, who had not lost a single battle in the campaign. By mid-September he was resigned to leave the country, and he departed Warsaw in early October. Kościuszko settled in Leipzig, where many other notable Polish commanders and politicians formed an émigrée community. Soon he and some others began preparing an uprising against Russian rule in Poland. The politicians, grouped around Ignacy Potocki and Hugo Kołłątaj, sought contacts with similar opposition groups formed in Poland and by spring 1793 had been joined by other politicians and revolutionaries, including Ignacy Działyński. While Kołłątaj and others had begun planning for the uprising before meeting Kościuszko, his support was a major boon for them, as he was, at that time, among the most popular individuals in the entire Poland.

In August 1793 Kościuszko returned to Leipzig where he was met with demands to start planning for the uprising; however, he was worried that an uprising would have little chance against the three partitioners. In September he would clandestinely cross the Polish border to conduct personal observations, and to meet some sympathetic high-ranking officers in the remaining Polish Army, including general Józef Wodzicki. The preparations in Poland were slow and he decided to postpone the outbreak, and left for Italy, planning to return in February. However, the situation in Poland was changing rapidly. The Russian and Prussian governments forced Poland to again disband the majority of her armed forces and the reduced units were to be drafted into the Russian army. Also, in March the tsarist agents discovered the group of revolutionaries in Warsaw and started arresting notable Polish politicians and military commanders. Kościuszko was forced to execute his plan earlier than expected, and on 15 March 1794 he set off for Kraków.

On 12 March 1794, General Antoni Madaliński, the commander of 1st Greater Polish National Cavalry Brigade (1,500 men) decided to disobey the order to demobilise, advancing his troops from Ostrołęka to Kraków. This sparked an outbreak of riots against Russian forces throughout the country. The Russian garrison of Kraków was ordered to leave the city and confront Madalinski, which left Kraków completely undefended, but also foiled Kosciuszko's plan to seize their weapons.

== Uprising ==
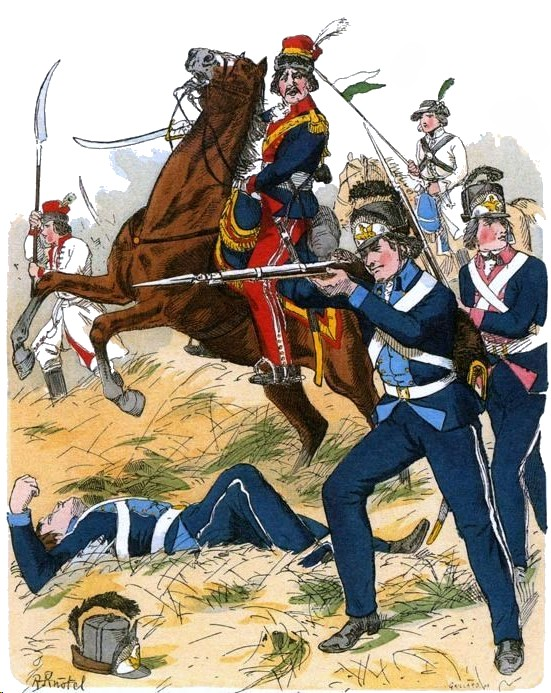
Polish soldiers of the Uprising

On 24 March 1794, Tadeusz Kościuszko, a veteran of the Continental Army in the American Revolutionary War, announced the general uprising in a speech in the Kraków town square and assumed the powers of the Commander-in-Chief of all the Polish forces.

At the outbreak of the Kościuszko Uprising on March 24, 1794, Tadeusz Kościuszko had at his disposal approximately 800 men—comprising one battalion each from the 2nd (Wodzicki’s) and 3rd (Czapski’s) Infantry Regiments—and Manget’s cavalry brigade of ten squadrons. Brigadier Antoni Madaliński, whose brigade had already mutinied, was advancing toward Kraków with up to 1,000 cavalry troopers. Three additional battalions from the 3rd and 6th Infantry Regiments were also marching on the city. Combined, these forces—totalling up to 4,000 men—constituted the insurrection’s only active military force at its inception.

Following Russian territorial annexations and a partially executed troop reduction, the Polish–Lithuanian Commonwealth’s army numbered roughly 26,000 men. An additional 4,000 soldiers who had been forcibly drafted into Russian service later escaped to rejoin the Polish forces. This army was dispersed in small garrisons across the remaining Polish territory and was closely monitored everywhere by superior Russian forces. According to Marian Kukiel, even if the army had successfully concentrated, it would have been far too weak to withstand both Russia and Prussia, while Austria maintained a hostile neutrality.

Drawing on his experience in the American Revolutionary War and inspired by the French concept of the levée en masse (a nationwide draft), Kościuszko aimed to expand the regular army to a maximum of 100,000 soldiers. In liberated territories, conscription mandates required every five households to supply one infantryman and every fifty households to provide one cavalryman. Recruits were required to arrive fully clothed, equipped, and armed. These draftees, along with volunteers, reinforced artillery units, engineering battalions, and foot infantry.

Kościuszko also created a civic militia, raised primarily in urban centers and organized into battalions. It absorbed recruits that the regular army could not accommodate, alongside all men aged 18 to 28 summoned under special call-up orders. The militia fought alongside regular forces, and entire infantry regiments were occasionally formed from its ranks. All other men aged 18 to 40 were subject to the pospolite ruszenie—a general levy encompassing all social estates. Kukiel characterizes these measures as an attempt to introduce universal military service, assessing that while the urban militia possessed genuine military value, the general levy remained an uncoordinated formation due to a severe shortage of experienced commanders.

Severe shortages of firearms and ammunition fundamentally reshaped the insurgent infantry. War scythes, fitted with blades set vertically inline with the shaft, replaced the pikes used by the French National Guard. Scythemen (kosynierzy) attacked in charging columns, adapting the French tactical model of combining skirmisher and artillery fire with rapid assault. Kościuszko also streamlined regular infantry tactics: he eliminated platoon volleys, instructing battalions to fire a few rapid volleys before charging with bayonets. Because muskets were in short supply, troops in the third rank typically carried scythes. In militia units, only the front rank was equipped with firearms, while the second and third ranks bore scythes and pikes. Grenadier battalions were established as regular units, dressed in traditional peasant attire and armed exclusively with scythes.

The cavalry underwent a similar reorganization. Elite towarzysze officers were grouped into dedicated squadrons, leaving most remaining squadrons composed entirely of rank-and-file troopers. Cavalry carbines were reassigned to equip the infantry, and the entire cavalry corps was issued lances. Over the course of the eight-month insurrection, approximately 150,000 men took up arms, including nearly 100,000 who served in the regular army. Despite frequent setbacks and defeats, a force of around 70,000 men maintained active resistance for months.

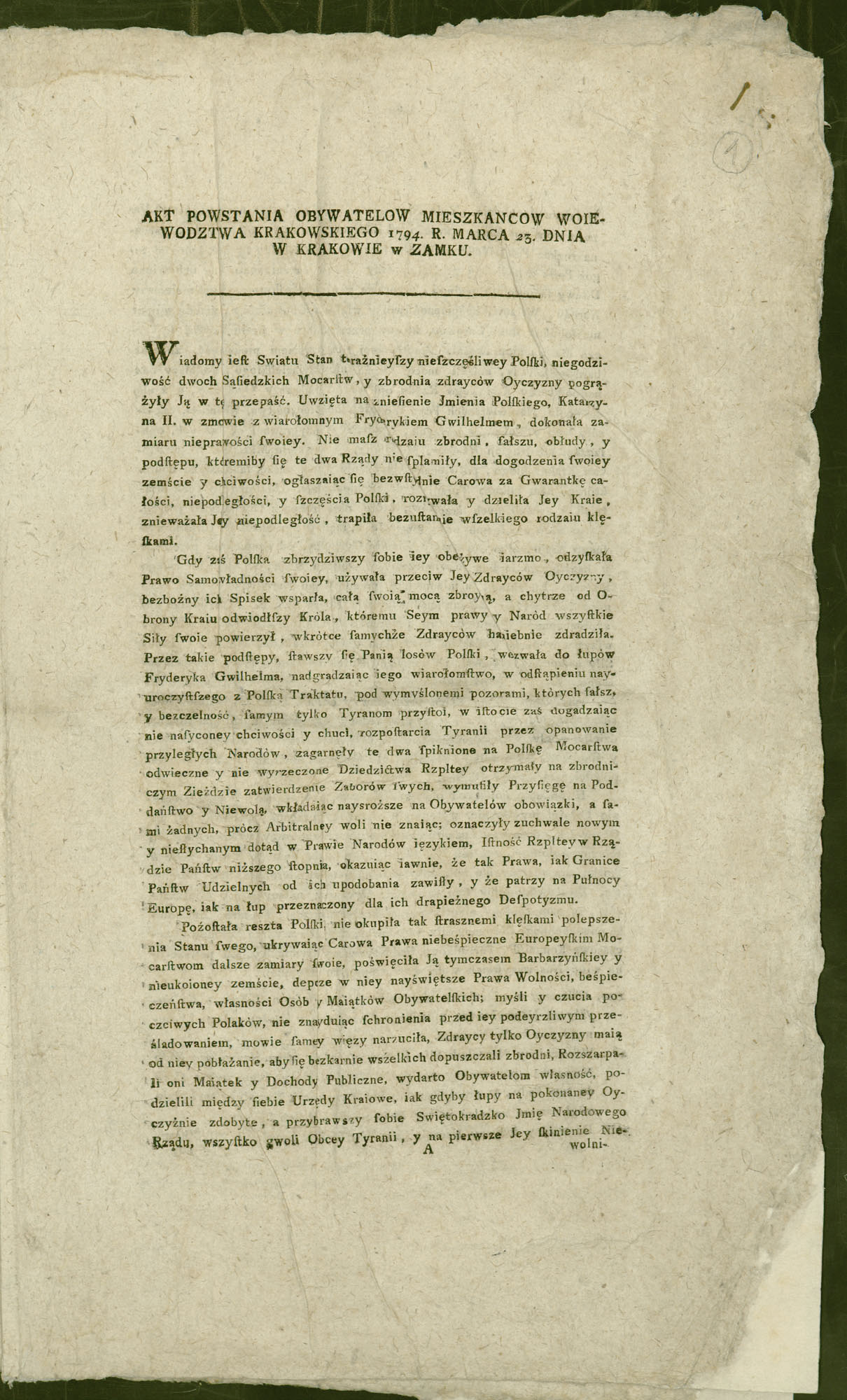
Act of Kościuszko Uprising, 24 March 1794

To destroy the still weak opposition, Russian Empress Catherine the Great ordered the corps of Major General Fiodor Denisov to attack Kraków. On 4 April both armies met near the village of Racławice. In what became known as the Battle of Racławice Kościuszko's forces defeated the technically superior opponent. After the bloody battle the Russian forces withdrew from the battlefield. Kościuszko's forces were too weak to start a successful pursuit and wipe the Russian forces out of Lesser Poland. Although the strategic importance of the victory was close to none, the news of the victory spread fast and soon other parts of Poland joined the ranks of the revolutionaries. By early April the Polish forces concentrated in the lands of Lublin and Volhynia, ready to be sent to Russia, joined the ranks of Kościuszko's forces.

On 17 April in Warsaw, the Russian attempt to arrest those suspected of supporting the insurrection and to disarm the weak Polish garrison of Warsaw under Gen. Stanisław Mokronowski by seizing the arsenal at Miodowa Street resulted in an uprising against the Russian garrison of Warsaw, led by Jan Kiliński, in the face of indecisiveness of the King of Poland, Stanisław II Augustus. The insurgents were aided by the incompetence of Russian ambassador and commander, Iosif Igelström, and the chosen day being the Thursday of Holy Week when many soldiers of the Russian garrison went to the churches for the Eucharist not carrying their arms. Finally, from the onset of the insurrection, the Polish forces were aided by the civilian population and had surprise on their side as they attacked many separate groups of soldiers at the same time and the resistance to Russian forces quickly spread over the city. After two days of heavy fighting the Russians, who suffered between 2,000 and 4,000 casualties out of an initial 5,000 strong garrison, were forced to leave the city. A similar uprising was started by Jakub Jasiński in Vilnius on 23 April and soon other cities and towns followed.

On 7 May 1794, Kościuszko issued an act that became known as the "Proclamation of Połaniec", in which he partially abolished serfdom in Poland, granted civil liberty to all peasants and provided them with state help against abuses by the nobility. Although the new law never fully came into being and was boycotted by much of the nobility, it also attracted many peasants to the ranks of the revolutionaries. It was the first time in Polish history that the peasants were officially regarded as part of the nation, the word being previously equivalent to nobility.

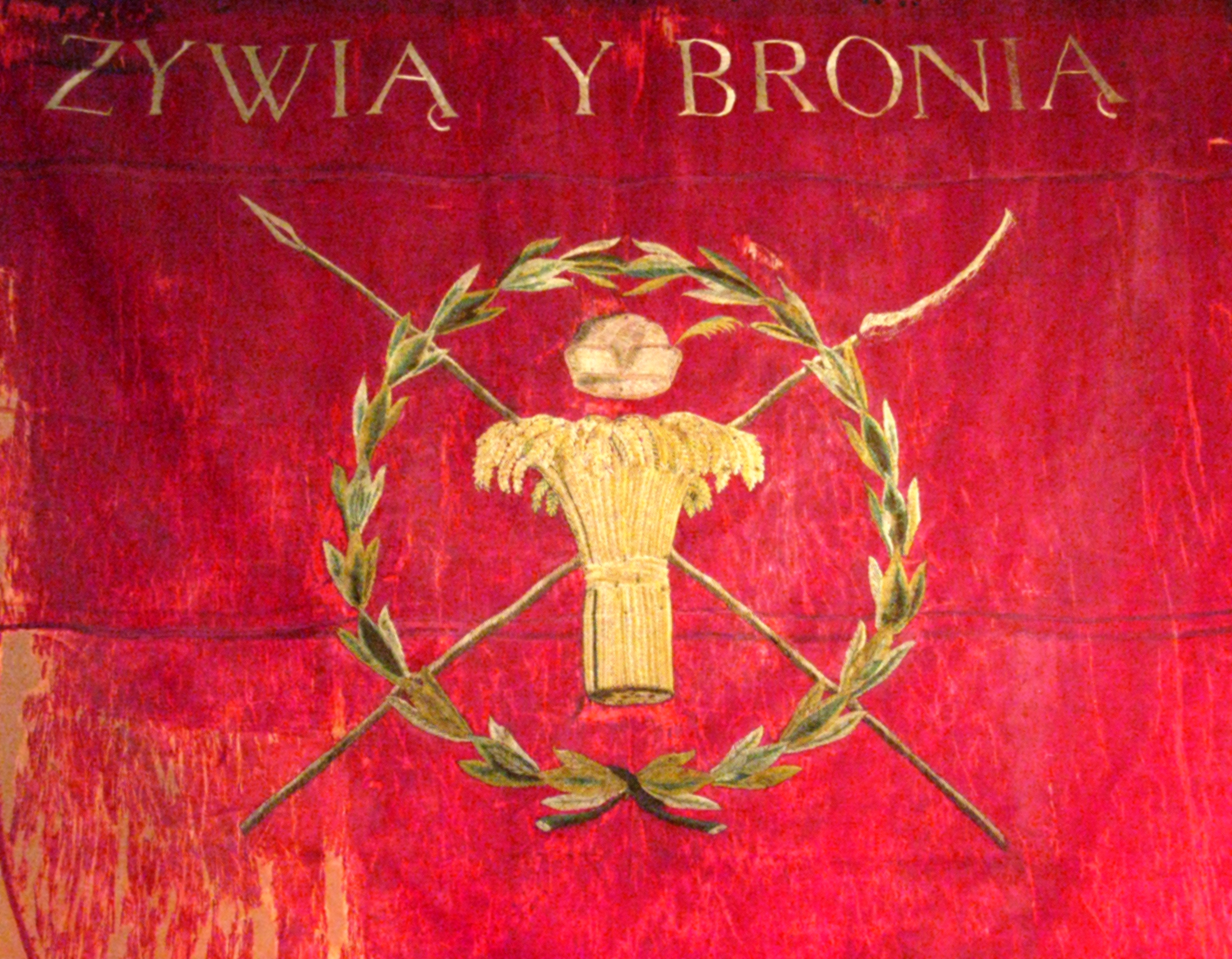
Flag of Polish peasant grenadier soldiers in Kraków with the words "They Feed and Defend"

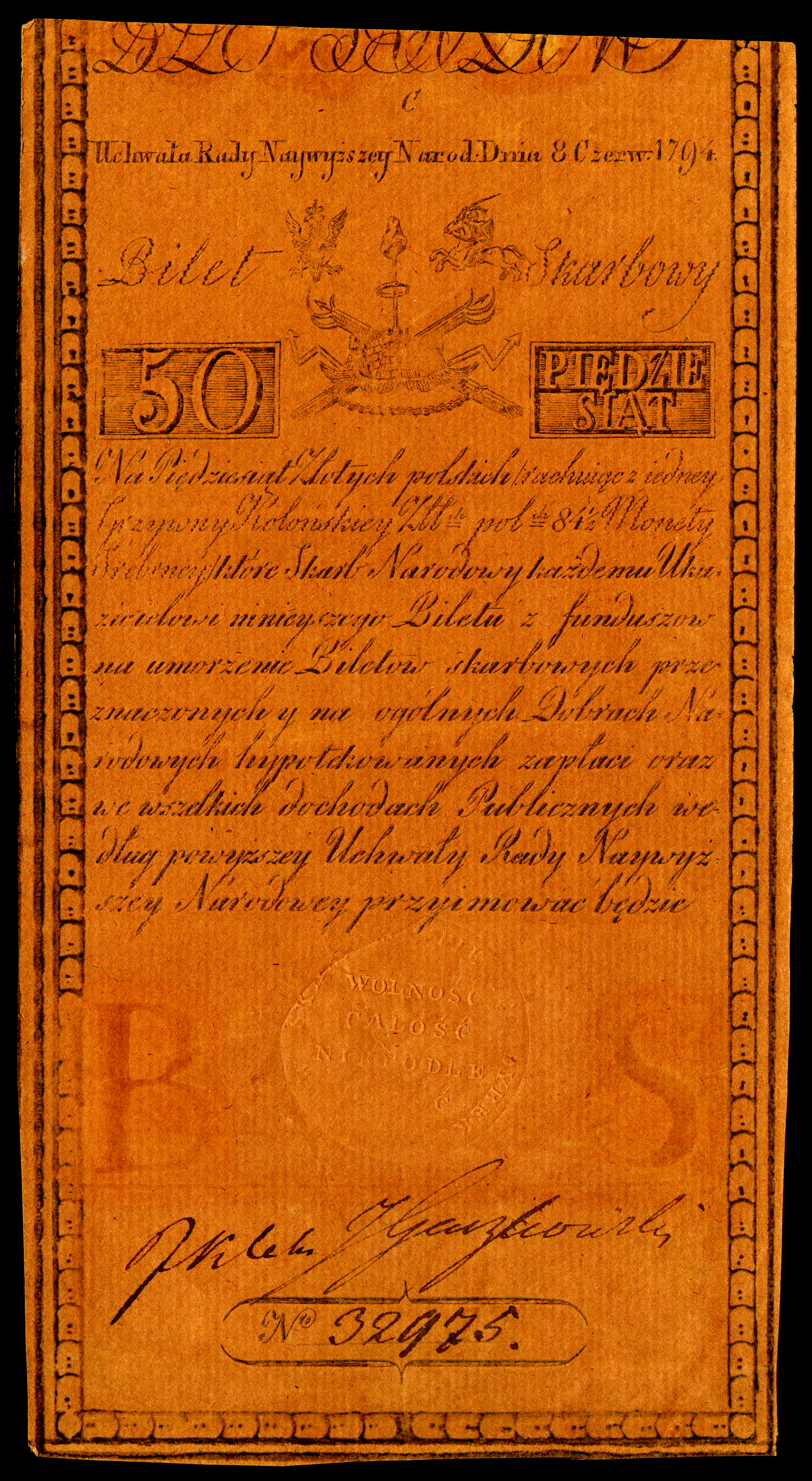
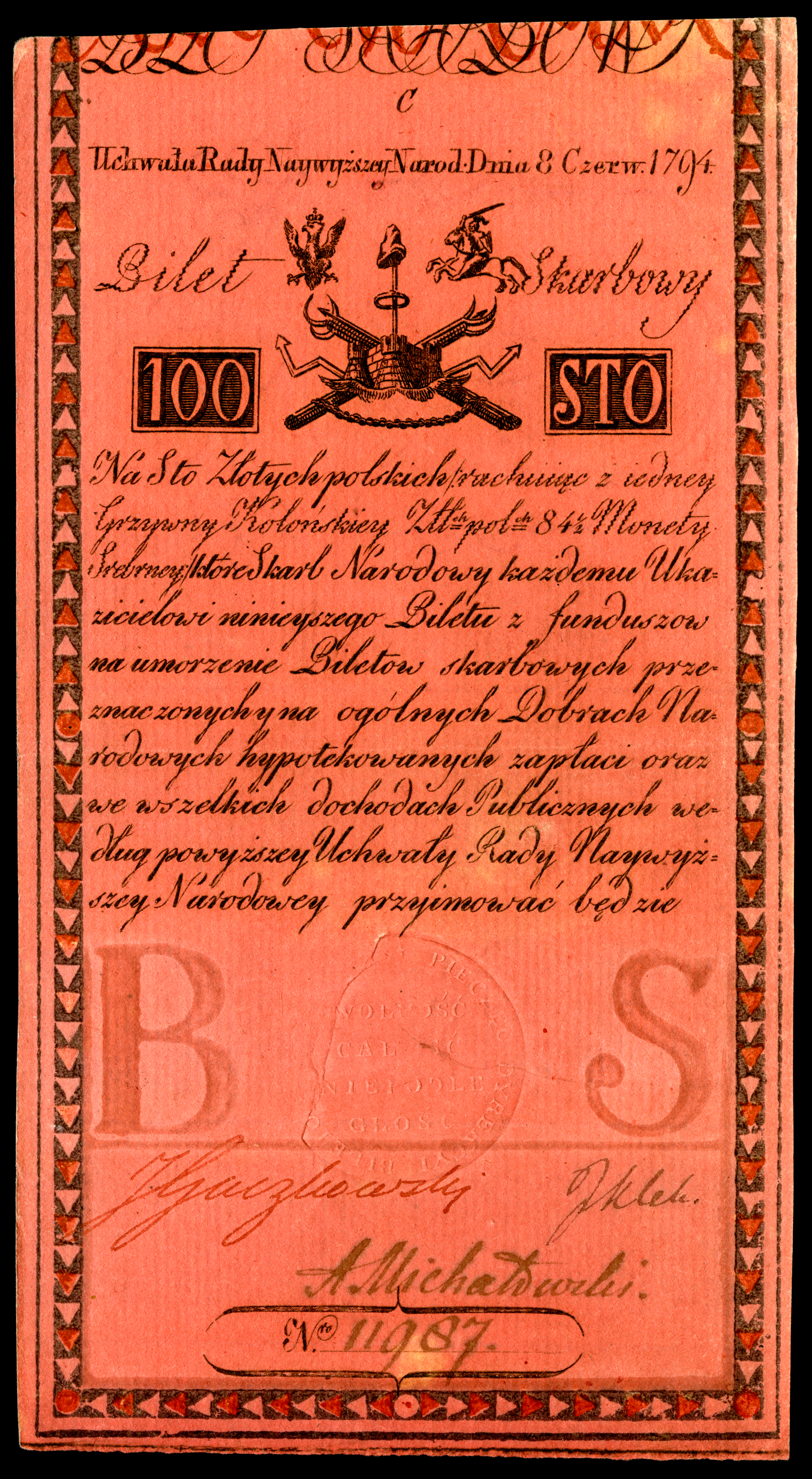
The Polish–Lithuanian Commonwealth first issued złotych banknotes on 8 June 1794 under the authority of Tadeusz Kościuszko. The 50 and 100 złotych are depicted above.

Despite the promise of reforms and quick recruitment of new forces, the strategic situation of the Polish forces, which consisted of 6,000 peasants, cavalry, and 9,000 soldiers, was still critical. On 10 May the forces of Prussia (17,500 soldiers under General Francis Favrat), crossed the Polish borders and joined the 9,000 Russian soldiers operating in northern Poland. On 6 June Kościuszko was defeated in the Battle of Szczekociny by a joint Russo-Prussian force and on 8 June General Józef Zajączek was defeated in the Battle of Chełm. Polish forces withdrew towards Warsaw and started to fortify the city under directions from Kosciuszko and his 16,000 soldiers, 18,000 peasants and 15,000 burghers. On 15 June the Prussian army captured Kraków unopposed. Warsaw was besieged by 41,000 Russians under General Ivan Fersen and 25,000 Prussians under King Frederick William II of Prussia on 13 July. On 20 August, an uprising in Greater Poland started and the Prussians were forced to withdraw their forces from Warsaw. The siege was lifted by 6 September when the Prussians and Russians had both withdrawn their troops.

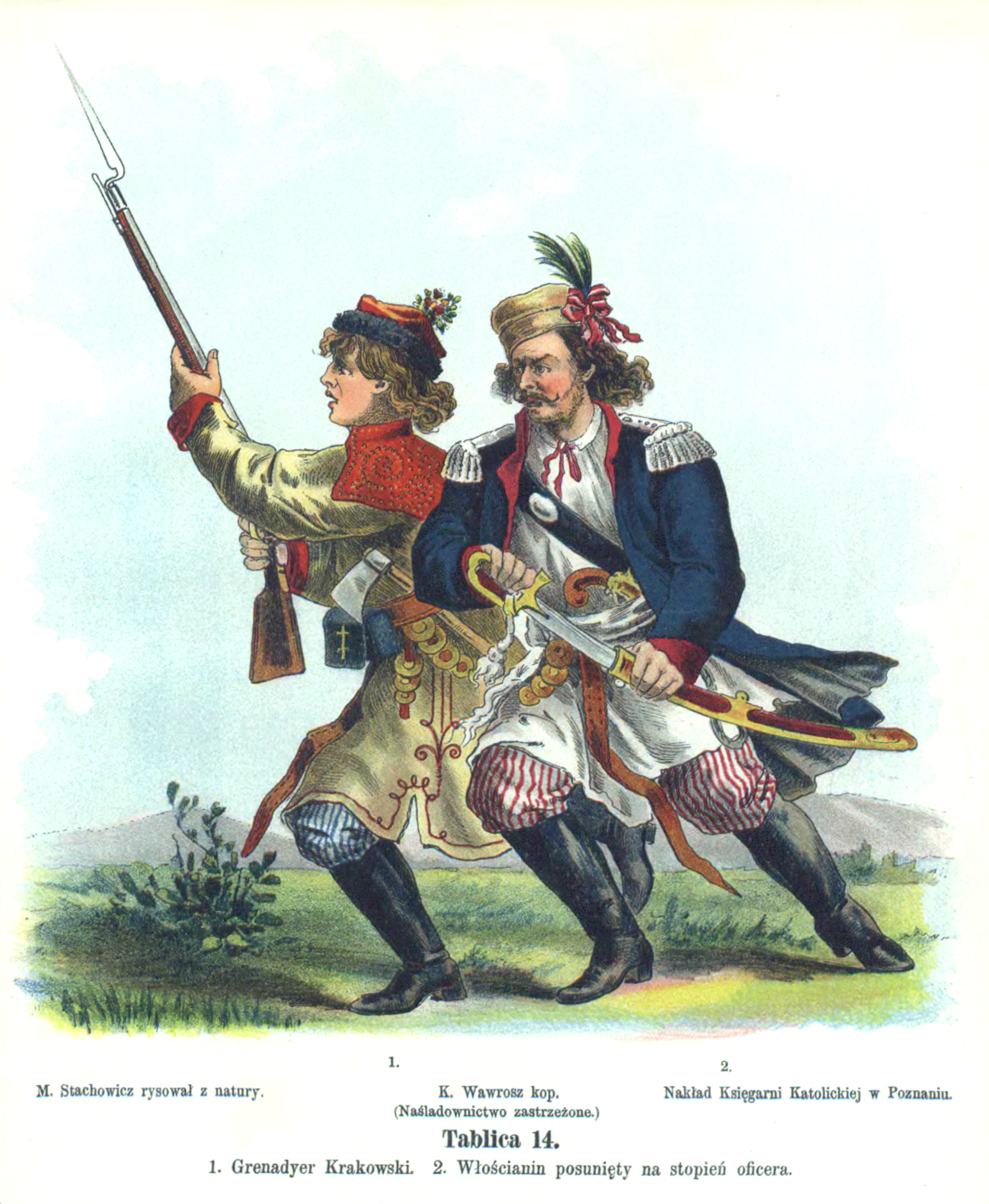
Polish Grenadiers in peasant costumes, Kraków 1794

Although the opposition in Lithuania was crushed by Russian forces (Vilnius was besieged and capitulated on 12 August), the uprising in Greater Poland achieved some success. A Polish corps under Jan Henryk Dąbrowski captured Bydgoszcz (2 October) and entered Pomerania almost unopposed. Thanks to the mobility of his forces, General Dąbrowski evaded being encircled by a much less mobile Prussian army and disrupted the Prussian lines, forcing the Prussians to withdraw most of their forces from central Poland. However, the Poles did not stay long in Prussian territories, and soon retreated to Central Poland.

Meanwhile, the Russians equipped a new corps commanded by General Aleksandr Suvorov and ordered it to join up with the corps under Ivan Fersen near Warsaw. After the Battle of Krupczyce (17 September) and the Battle of Terespol (19 September), the new army started its march towards Warsaw. Trying to prevent both Russian armies from joining up, Kościuszko mobilised two regiments from Warsaw and with General Sierakowski's 5,000 soldiers, engaged Fersen's force of 14,000 on 10 October in the Battle of Maciejowice. Kościuszko was wounded in the battle and was captured by the Russians, who sent him to Saint Petersburg.

The new commander of the uprising, Tomasz Wawrzecki, could not control the spreading internal struggles for power and ultimately became only the commander of weakened military forces, while the political power was held by General Józef Zajączek, who in turn had to struggle with both the leftist liberal Polish Jacobins and the rightist and monarchical nobility.

Suvorov's troops grew angry due to resistance and also due to tales of atrocities committed against Russian troops in the spring, leading to Suvorov's army to commit to an assault. On 4 November, the joint Russian forces started the Battle of Praga, named after the right-bank suburb of Warsaw where it took place. After four hours of brutal hand-to-hand fighting, the 22,000-strong Russian forces broke through the Polish defences and Suvorov allowed his Cossacks to loot and burn Warsaw. By one Russian estimate, approximately 20,000 were murdered in the Praga massacre, including both military personnel and civilians. Zajaczek fled wounded, abandoning the Polish army.

On 16 November, near Radoszyce, Wawrzecki surrendered. This marked the end of the uprising. The power of Poland was broken and the following year the third partition of Poland took place, after which Austria, Russia and Prussia annexed the remainder of the country.

== Aftermath ==
The uprising was bloodily suppressed, the Polish rebels lost 27,000 men and the Russians 4,080. After the failure of the Kościuszko Uprising, Poland ceased to exist for 123 years, and all of its institutions were gradually banned by the partitioning powers. However, the uprising also marked the start of modern political thought in Poland and Central Europe. Kościuszko's Proclamation of Połaniec and the radical leftist Jacobins started the Polish leftist movement. Many prominent Polish politicians who were active during the uprising became the backbone of Polish politics, both at home and abroad, in the 19th century. Also, Prussia had much of its forces tied up in Poland and could not field enough forces to suppress the French Revolution, which contributed to the success of the revolution and briefly restored a Polish state.

In the lands of partitioned Poland, the failure of the uprising meant economic catastrophe, as centuries-old economic markets became divided and separated from each other, resulting in the collapse of trade. Several banks fell and some of the few manufacturing centres established in the Commonwealth were closed. Reforms made by the reformers and Kościuszko, aimed at easing serfdom, were revoked. All the partitioning powers heavily taxed their newly acquired lands, filling their treasuries at the expense of the local population.

The schooling system was also degraded as the schools in the partitioned territories were given low priority. The Commission of National Education, the world's first Ministry of Education, was abolished, because the absolutist governments of the partitioning powers saw no gain in investing in education in the territories inhabited by restless Polish minorities. The creation of educational institutions in the partitions became very difficult. For example, an attempt to create a university in Warsaw was opposed by the Prussian authorities. Further, in the German and Russian partitions, all remaining centers of learning were subject to Germanisation and Russification; only in territories acquired by Austria was there relatively little governmental intervention in the curriculum. According to S. I. Nikołajew, from the cultural point of view the partitions may have given a step forward towards the development of national Polish literature and arts, since the inhabitants of partitioned lands could acquire the cultural developments of German and Russian Enlightenment.

The conditions for the former Polish elite were particularly harsh in Russian partition. Thousands of Polish szlachta families who supported Kościuszko's uprising were stripped of their possessions and estates, which were awarded to Russian generals and favourites of the St. Petersburg court. It is estimated that 650,000 former Polish serfs were transferred to Russian officials in this manner. Some among the nobility, especially in Lithuanian and Ruthenian regions of the former Commonwealth, were expelled to southern Russia, where they were subject to Russification. Other nobles were denied their nobility status by Russian authorities, which meant loss of legal privileges and social status, significantly limiting any possibility of a career in administration or the military – the traditional career paths of Polish nobles. It also meant that they could not own any land, another blow to their former noble status. But for Orthodox Christian peasants of Western Ukraine and Belarus, the partition may have brought the decline of religious oppression by their formal lords, followers of Roman Catholicism.

However, Orthodox Christians were only a small minority in Eastern Belarus at that time; the prevailing majority of the country's population was Eastern rite Catholics. Peasants were flogged just for mentioning the name of Kościuszko and his idea of abolishing serfdom. Platon Zubov, who was awarded estates in Lithuania, was especially infamous, as he personally tortured to death many peasants who complained about worsening conditions. Besides this, the Russian authorities conducted heavy recruiting for the Russian army among the population, which meant a practically lifelong service. Since the conditions of serfdom in former Poland due to the exploitation by nobility and arendators were already severe, discussion exists on how partitions influenced the life of common people.

== List of battles ==
- Battle of Racławice
- Warsaw Uprising
- Vilnius Uprising
- Battle of Niemenczyn
- Battle of Polany
- Battle of Lipniszki
- Battle of Szczekociny
- Battle of Chełm
- Battle of Soły
- Courland Uprising
- Battle of Gołków
- Battle of Raszyn
- Battle of Kolno
- Battle of Błonie
- Battle of Rajgród
- Siege of Warsaw
- Battle of Saločiai
- Battle of Słonim
- Battle of Lubań
- Battle of Krupczyce
- Battle of Brest
- Greater Poland Uprising
- Battle of Łabiszyn
- Battle of Bydgoszcz
- Battle of Maciejowice
- Battle of Kobyłka
- Battle of Praga

== See also ==
- Supreme National Council
- Polish Uprisings
- Battle of Praga
- the painting Racławice Panorama

== Sources ==
=== In English ===
- Bideleux, Robert; Jeffries, Ian (28 January 1998). A History of Eastern Europe: Crisis and Change. Psychology Press. ISBN 978-0-415-16111-4.
- Carsten, Francis Ludwig, ed. (1975) [1961]. The New Cambridge Modern History. Vol. 5: The Ascendancy of France, 1648–88. Cambridge University Press. ISBN 978-0-521-04544-5.
- Davies, Norman (30 March 2005). God's Playground: A History of Poland. Vol. I: The origins to 1795. Columbia University Press. ISBN 978-0-231-12817-9.
- Górny, Maciej (2006). "The Targowica Confederation". In Kopeček, Michal (ed.). Late Enlightenment: Emergence of the Modern 'National Idea' (PDF). Discourses of Collective Identity in Central and Southeast Europe (1770–1945). Vol. 1. Central European University Press. ISBN 978-963-7326-52-3.
- Jędruch, Jacek (1982). Constitutions, Elections, and Legislatures of Poland, 1493–1977: A Guide to Their History. University Press of America. ISBN 978-0-7818-0637-4.
- LeDonne, John P. (1997). The Russian empire and the world, 1700–1917: the geopolitics of expansion and containment. Oxford University Press. ISBN 978-0-19-510927-6.
- Lord, Robert Howard (1915). The Second Partition of Poland: A Study in Diplomatic History. Harvard University Press. OCLC 579571081.
- Lukowski, Jerzy (3 August 2010). Disorderly liberty: the political culture of the Polish-Lithuanian Commonwealth in the eighteenth century. Continuum International Publishing Group. ISBN 978-1-4411-4812-4.
- Lukowski, Jerzy; Zawadzki, Hubert (2001). A Concise History of Poland. Cambridge University Press. ISBN 978-0-521-55917-1.
- Pickus, David (2001). Dying With an Enlightening Fall: Poland in the Eyes of German Intellectuals, 1764–1800. Lexington Books. ISBN 978-0-7391-0153-7.
- Rambaud, Alfred; Saltus, Edgar (1902). Russia. Nations of the World. Leonora B. Lang (transl.). New York: P. F. Collier & son. p. 122. OCLC 3099256. "IGELSTRoM."
- Sanford, George (2002). Democratic government in Poland: constitutional politics since 1989. Palgrave Macmillan. ISBN 978-0-333-77475-5.
- Stone, Daniel (2001). The Polish–Lithuanian State: 1386–1795. University of Washington Press. ISBN 978-0-295-98093-5.
- Storozynski, Alex (28 April 2009). The Peasant Prince: Thaddeus Kosciuszko and the Age of Revolution. St. Martin's Press. ISBN 978-0-312-62594-8.
- Wandycz, Piotr Stefan (2001). The price of freedom: a history of East Central Europe from the Middle Ages to the present. Psychology Press. ISBN 978-0-415-25491-5.

=== In Polish ===
- Bauer, Krzysztof (1991). Uchwalenie i obrona Konstytucji 3 Maja [Passing and Fall of the 3 May Constitution] (in Polish). Wydawnictwa Szkolne i Pedagogiczne. ISBN 978-83-02-04615-5.
- Gierowski, Józef Andrzej (1986). Historia Polski, 1764–1864 [History of Poland, 1764–1864] (in Polish). Warszawa: Państwowe Wydawnictwo Naukowe. ISBN 978-83-01-03732-1.
- Herbst, Stanisław (1969). "Tadeusz Kościuszko". Polski Słownik Biograficzny (in Polish). Vol. 14. Wrocław: Zakład narodowy im. Ossolińskich.
- Łojek, Jerzy (1986). Geneza i obalenie Konstytucji 3 maja [Genesis and Fall of the 3 May Constitution] (in Polish). Wydawn. Lubelskie. ISBN 978-83-222-0313-2.
- Mikuła, Wojciech (1991). Maciejowice 1794 (in Polish). Warsaw: Bellona. ISBN 83-11-07867-X.
- Nadzieja, Jadwiga (1988). Od Jakobina do księcia namiestnika [From Jacobin to Prince Namestnik] (in Polish). Wydawnictwo "Śląsk". ISBN 978-83-216-0682-8.
- Storozynski, Alex (January 2011). Kościuszko: Książe chłopów [Kościuszko: Prince of Peasants] (in Polish). W.A.B. ISBN 978-83-7414-930-3.
- "Igelström Iosif A.". PWN Encyclopaedia (in Polish). Warsaw: Polish Scientific Publishers PWN.

=== In Russian ===
- Orlov, Nikolay Aleksandrovich (1894). Штурм Праги Суворовым в 1794 году [The storming of Praga by Suvorov in 1794] (in Russian). St. Petersburg: Типография Штаба войск Гвардии и Петербургского военного округа.
- Velichko, Konstantin I.; Novitsky, Vasily F.; Schwarz, Alexey V. von; Apushkin, Vladimir A.; Schoultz, Gustav K. von (1913). Военная энциклопедия Сытина [Sytin Military Encyclopedia] (in Russian). Vol. 13. Кобленц – Круз. Moscow: Типография Т-ва И. Д. Сытина. p. 4.
