= Battle of Rajgród (1794) =

Battle of the Kościuszko Uprising

- Part of the Kościuszko Uprising
| Date | 10 July 1794 |
| Location | Rajgród |
| Result | Polish victory |

Belligerents
| Kingdom of Prussia | Poland-Lithuania |

The Battle of Rajgród (Polish: Bitwa pod Rajgrodem) was a battle of the Kościuszko Uprising between the Polish–Lithuanian Commonwealth's insurrectionist army and the Kingdom of Prussia which took place in Rajgród on 1794 July 10. Polish insurrectionists using the melee weapons and without heavy artillery were able to temporarily push out the Prussian army from the city.
