= Dąbrowski coat of arms =

Polish coat of arms

Dąbrowski
- Battle cry: Jelita, Nagody
- Alternative names: Panna, Virgo Violata
- Earliest mention: 15th century
- Families: 5 names Czepelin, Dąbrowski, Kremski, Sczupliński, Szczupliński

Dąbrowski (Panna, Virgo Violata) is a Polish coat of arms. It was used by several szlachta families.

== Blazon ==
Gules a woman habited argent shod, crined and crowned or, holding in each hand and fessewise to her mouth an ancient horn also or. Crest: issuant out of a crest coronet or a woman as in the arms holding in each hand an ancient horn palewise or the bell ends in base. Mantled gules doubled argent.

== Notable bearers ==
Notable bearers of this coat of arms include:

- Jan Henryk Dąbrowski

== Gallery ==
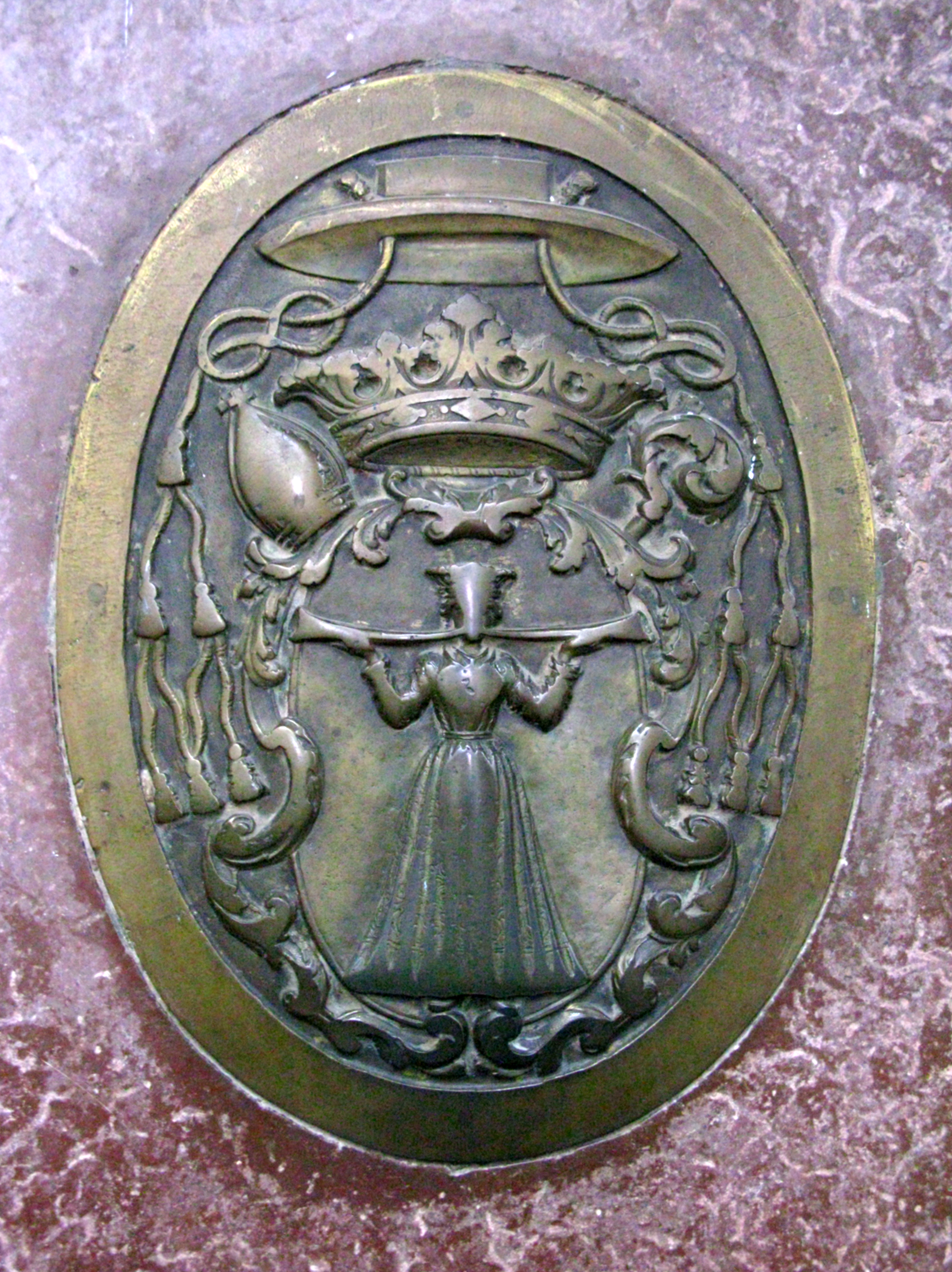
Dąbrowski Coat of Arms of abbot Kazimierz Dąbrowski

== See also ==
- Polish heraldry
- Heraldic family
- List of Polish nobility coats of arms

== Bibliography ==
- Adam Boniecki, "Herbarz Polski" (Warszawa, POLSKA: Gebethner i Wolff w Warszawie, 1901), Volume IV, page 124.
