= Antoni Madaliński =

Polish general and insurrectionist (1739–1805)

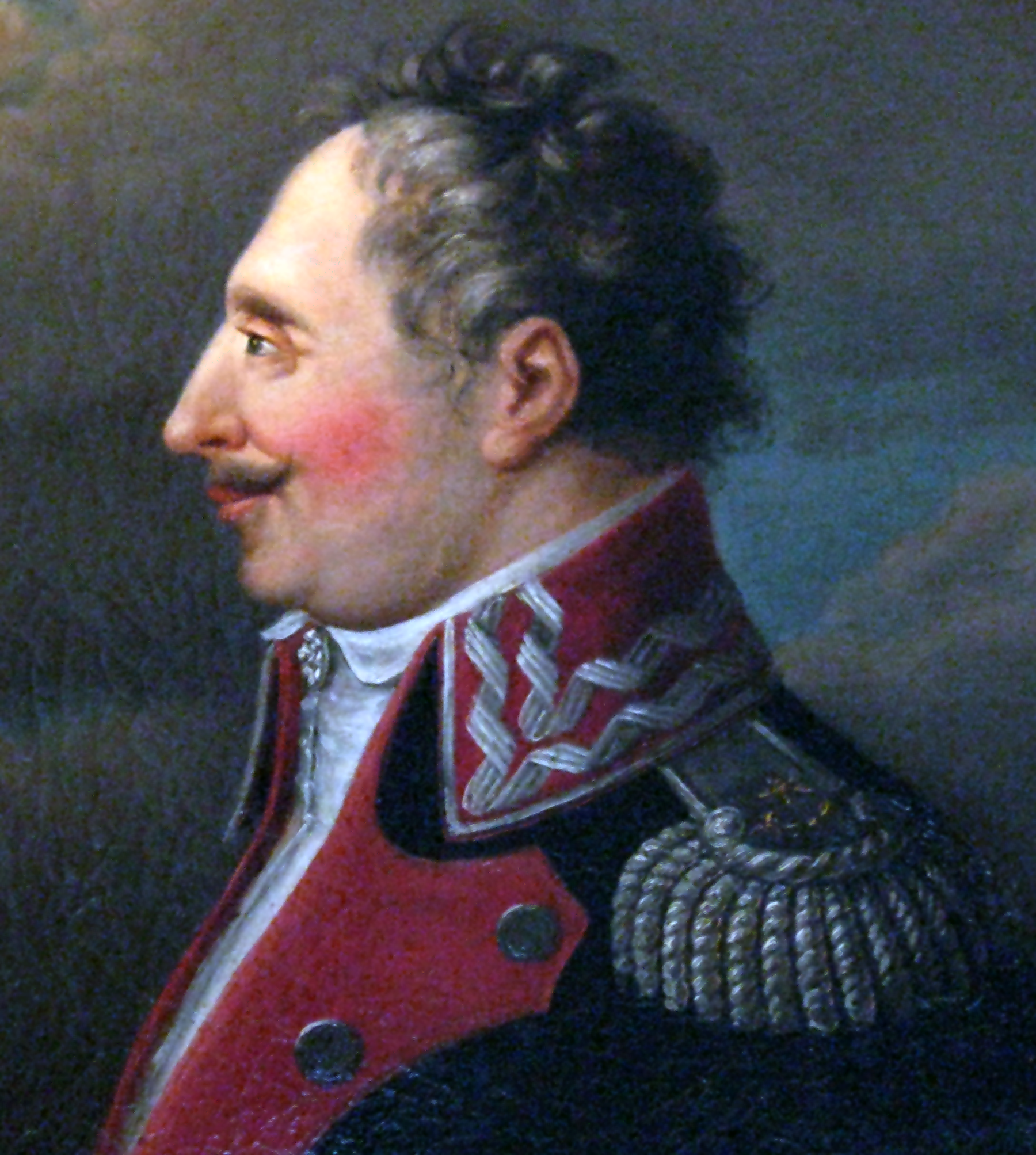
- Born: 1739
- Died: 1805
- Allegiance: Polish–Lithuanian Commonwealth
- Service / branch: National Cavalry
- Rank: Lieutenant General
- Commands: 1st Greater Polish National Cavalry Brigade
- Battles / wars: Polish–Russian War of 1792, Kościuszko Uprising, Battle of Racławice, Battle of Szczekociny

Antoni Madaliński (1739–1805) was a Polish Lieutenant General and commander of the 1st Greater Polish National Cavalry Brigade during the Kościuszko Uprising.

== Military career ==
Madaliński actively participated in the Bar Confederation and later, in 1786, was elected as a deputy to the Great Sejm. His military career also saw engagement in the Polish–Russian War of 1792. Notably, on March 12, 1794, Madaliński openly disobeyed orders to demobilize his unit, instead advancing his troops from Ostrołęka to Kraków and subsequently attacking Prussian army posts along the Polish border. This bold move ignited widespread riots against Russian forces throughout Poland and left the Russian garrison in Kraków unguarded as they were ordered to confront Polish forces. Madaliński also took part in the battles of Racławice and Szczekociny, and his formation notably facilitated the expedition of Polish forces, led by General Jan Henryk Dąbrowski, to Wielkopolska. Following the capitulation, Madaliński was imprisoned by the Prussians from 1795 to 1797.

== Legacy ==
Madaliński is commemorated for his courageous actions during tumultuous times in Polish history, particularly his insubordinate march from Ostrołęka to Kraków, which became a symbol of resistance and tenacity against oppressive regimes.

== Bibliography ==
- Marian Lech. Generał Antoni Madaliński.
- Wacław Tokarz. Marsz Madalińskiego, in: Rozprawy i szkice. Militaria, vol. II, Warszawa, 1959.
