= Jan Henryk Dąbrowski =

Polish general (1755–1818)

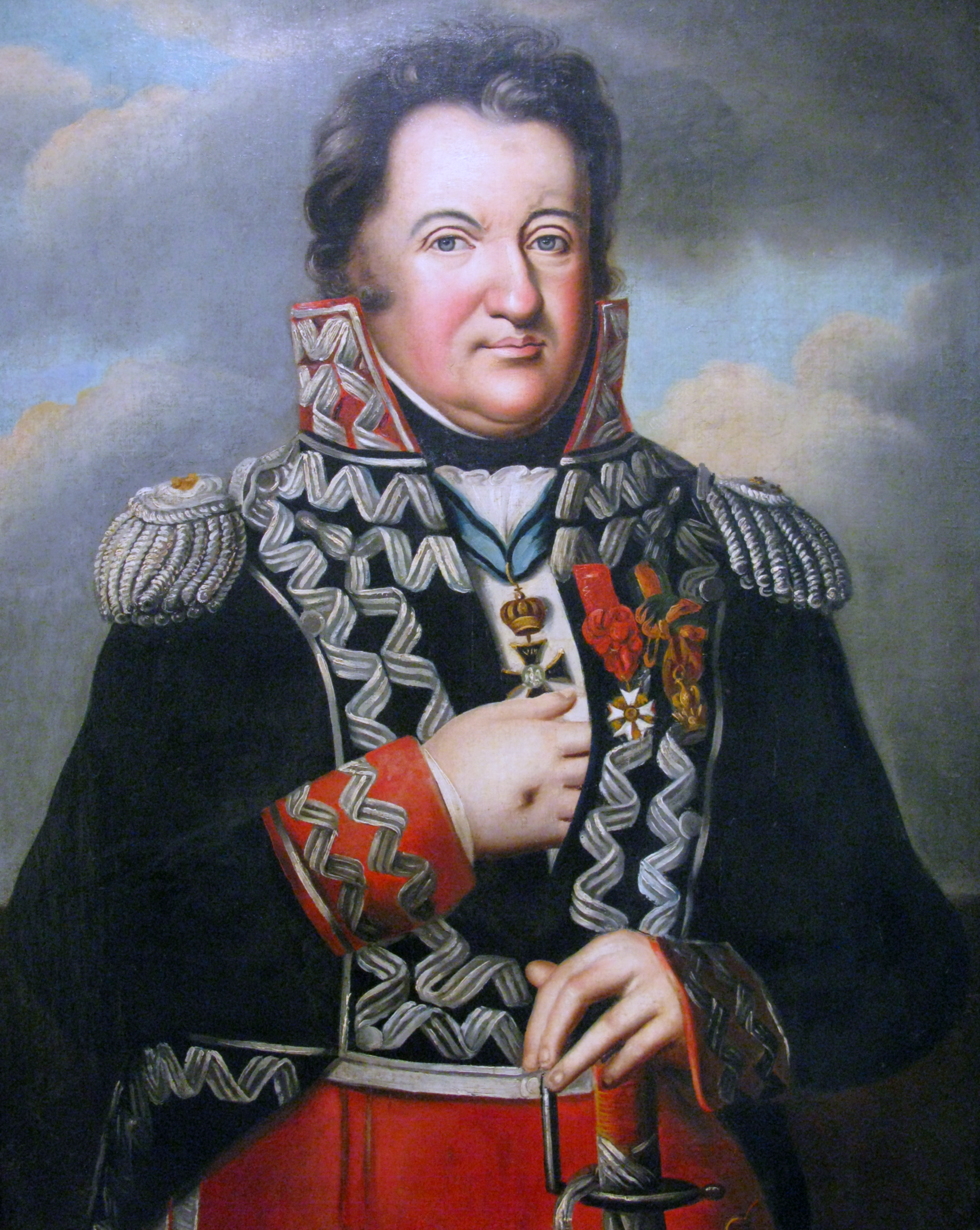
- Portrait in the Polish Army Museum Coat of arms: Dąbrowski
- Born: 2 August 1755 (Note: His date of birth is usually reported as 29 August 1755, following his own autobiographical account, through some sources give the date of 2 August, as reported in church documents.); Pierzchów, Poland
- Died: 6 June 1818 (aged 62); Winna Góra, Posen, Prussia
- Other names: German: Johann Heinrich Dombrowsky(-i); French: Jean Henri Dombrowski
- Military career
- Allegiance: Electorate of Saxony (1770–1791); Polish–Lithuanian Commonwealth (1791–1794); Cisalpine Republic (1796–1803); Italian Republic; Kingdom of Italy; Duchy of Warsaw (1807–1815)
- Branch: Cavalry
- Service years: 1770–1816
- Rank: General of Cavalry
- Conflicts: See list: War of the Bavarian Succession; Kościuszko Uprising; Greater Poland Uprising; Battle of Łabiszyn; Battle of Bydgoszcz; War of the Second Coalition; Battle of Trebbia; Battle of Novi; 2nd battle of Novi; War of the Third Coalition; War of the Fourth Coalition; Greater Poland Uprising; Austro-Polish War; French invasion of Russia; Battle of Grodno; Battle of Borisov; War of the Sixth Coalition
- Awards: Order of Virtuti Militari; Order of the White Eagle; Officer of the Legion of Honour; Order of the Iron Crown; Order of St. Vladimir; Order of St. Anna
- Other work: Senator of Congress Poland

Signature
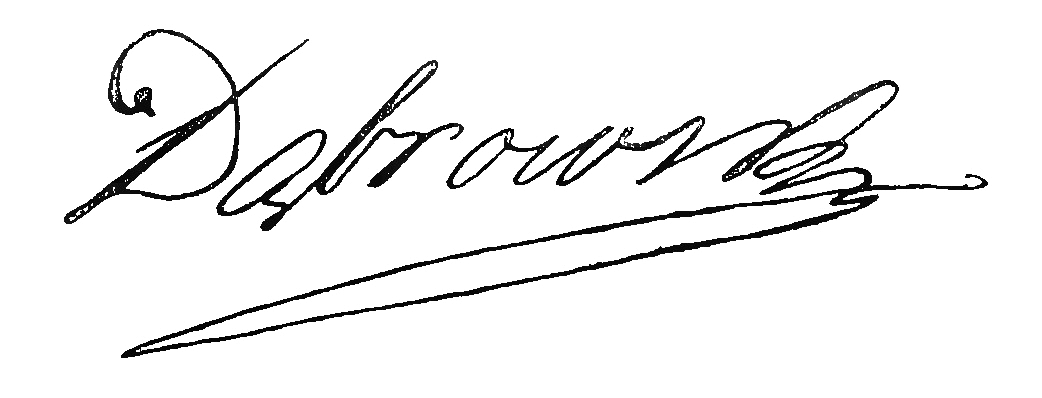

Jan Henryk Dąbrowski (Note: Polish pronunciation: [ˈjan ˈxɛnrɨɡ dɔmˈbrɔfskʲi]; he is also known as Johann Heinrich Dąbrowski (Dombrowski, Dombrowsky) in German and Jean Henri Dombrowski in French.) (2 August 1755 – 6 June 1818) was a Polish general and statesman, widely respected after his death for his patriotic attitude, and described as a national hero who spent his whole life fighting to restore the legacy and self-determination of Poland.

Dąbrowski initially served in the Saxon Army and joined the Polish–Lithuanian Commonwealth Army in 1792, shortly before the Second Partition of Poland. He was promoted to the rank of general in the Kościuszko Uprising of 1794. After the final Third Partition of Poland, which ended the existence of Poland as an independent country, he became actively involved in promoting the cause of Polish independence abroad. He was the founder of the Polish Legions in Italy serving under Napoleon Bonaparte from 1795, and as a general in Italian and French service he contributed to the brief restoration of the Polish state during the Greater Poland Uprising of 1806. He participated in the Napoleonic Wars, taking part in the Polish-Austrian war and the French invasion of Russia until 1813. After Napoleon's defeat, he accepted a senatorial position in the Russian-backed Congress Poland, and was one of the organizers of the Army of Congress Poland.

== Early life and education ==
Dąbrowski was born to Jan Michał Dąbrowski and Zofia Maria Dąbrowska (née Sophie von Lettow), in Pierzchów, Crown of the Kingdom of Poland, on 29 August 1755. He grew up in Hoyerswerda, Electorate of Saxony, where his father served as a colonel in the Saxon Army. He joined the Royal Saxon Horse Guards in 1770 or 1771. His family was of Polish origin. Nonetheless, in his childhood and youth he grew up surrounded by German culture in Saxony, and signed his name as Johann Heinrich Dąbrowski. He fought in the War of the Bavarian Succession (1778–1779), during which time his father died. Shortly afterwards in 1780 he married Gustawa Rackel. He lived in Dresden, and steadily progressed through the ranks, becoming a Rittmeister in 1789. He served as Adjutant general of King Frederick Augustus I of Saxony, from 1788 to 1791.

== Early career ==
Following the appeal of the Polish Four-Year Sejm to all Poles serving abroad to join the Polish army, and not seeing much opportunity to advance in his military career in the now-peaceful Saxony, on 28 June 1792, Dąbrowski joined the Army of the Polish–Lithuanian Commonwealth with a rank of podpułkownik and on 14 July he was promoted to the rank of vice-brigadier. Joining in the final weeks of the Polish–Russian War of 1792, he did not see combat in it. Unfamiliar with the intricacies of Polish politics, like many of Poniatowski's supporters, he joined the Targowica Confederation in late 1792.

Dąbrowski was seen as a cavalry expert, and King Stanisław August Poniatowski was personally interested in obtaining Dąbrowski's services. As a cavalryman educated in a Dresden military school under Count Maurice Bellegarde, a reformer of the Saxon army's cavalry, Dąbrowski was asked to help modernize the Polish cavalry, serving in the ranks of the 1st Greater Poland Cavalry Brigade (1 Wielkpolska Brygada Kawalerii Narodowej). In January 1793, stationed around Gniezno with two units of cavalry, about 200 strong, he briefly engaged the Prussian forces entering Poland in the aftermath of the Second Partition of Poland, and afterwards became a known activist, advocating the continuation of military struggle against the occupiers.

The Grodno Sejm, held in the fall of 1793, nominated him for a membership in a military commission; this caused him to be viewed with suspicion by the majority of the dissatisfied military, and he was not included in the preparations for the upcoming uprising. Thus he was taken by surprise when the Kościuszko Insurrection erupted, and his own brigade mutinied. He declared his support for the insurgents after the liberation of Warsaw, and from then on took an active part in the uprising, defending Warsaw and leading an army corps in support of an uprising in Greater Poland. His courage was commended by Tadeusz Kościuszko himself, the Supreme Commander of the National Armed Forces, who promoted him to the rank of general.

== In Napoleonic service ==
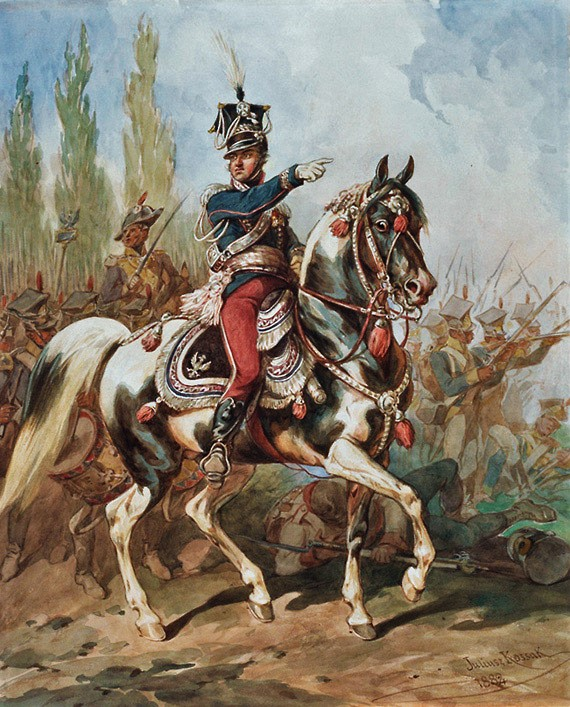
General Jan Henryk Dąbrowski at the head of the Legions, painting by Juliusz Kossak (1882)

After the failure of the uprising he remained in partitioned Poland for a while, attempting to convince the Prussian authorities that they needed Poland as an ally against Austria and Russia. He was unsuccessful, and with the Third Partition of Poland between Russia, Prussia and Austria, Poland disappeared from the map of Europe. Dąbrowski's next solution was to convince the French Republic that it should support a Polish cause, and create a Polish military formation. This proved to be more successful, and indeed Dąbrowski is remembered in the history of Poland as the organiser of Polish Legions in Italy during the Napoleonic Wars. (These Legions are also often known as the "Dąbrowski's Legions".) This event gave hope to contemporary Poles, and is still remembered in the Polish national anthem, named after Dąbrowski.

Dąbrowski began his work in 1796, when he came to Paris and soon afterwards met Napoleon Bonaparte in Milan. On 7 January 1797 he was authorized by the Cisalpine Republic to create Polish legions, which would be part of the army of the newly created Republic of Lombardy. In April, Dąbrowski lobbied for a plan to push through to the Polish territories in Galicia, but that was blocked by Napoleon who instead decided to use those troops on the Italian front. Dąbrowski's Polish soldiers fought at Napoleon's side from May 1797 until the beginning of 1803. As a commander of his legion he played an important part in the war in Italy, entered Rome in May 1798, and distinguished himself greatly at the Battle of Trebia on 19 June 1799, where he was wounded, as well as in other battles and combats of 1799–1801.

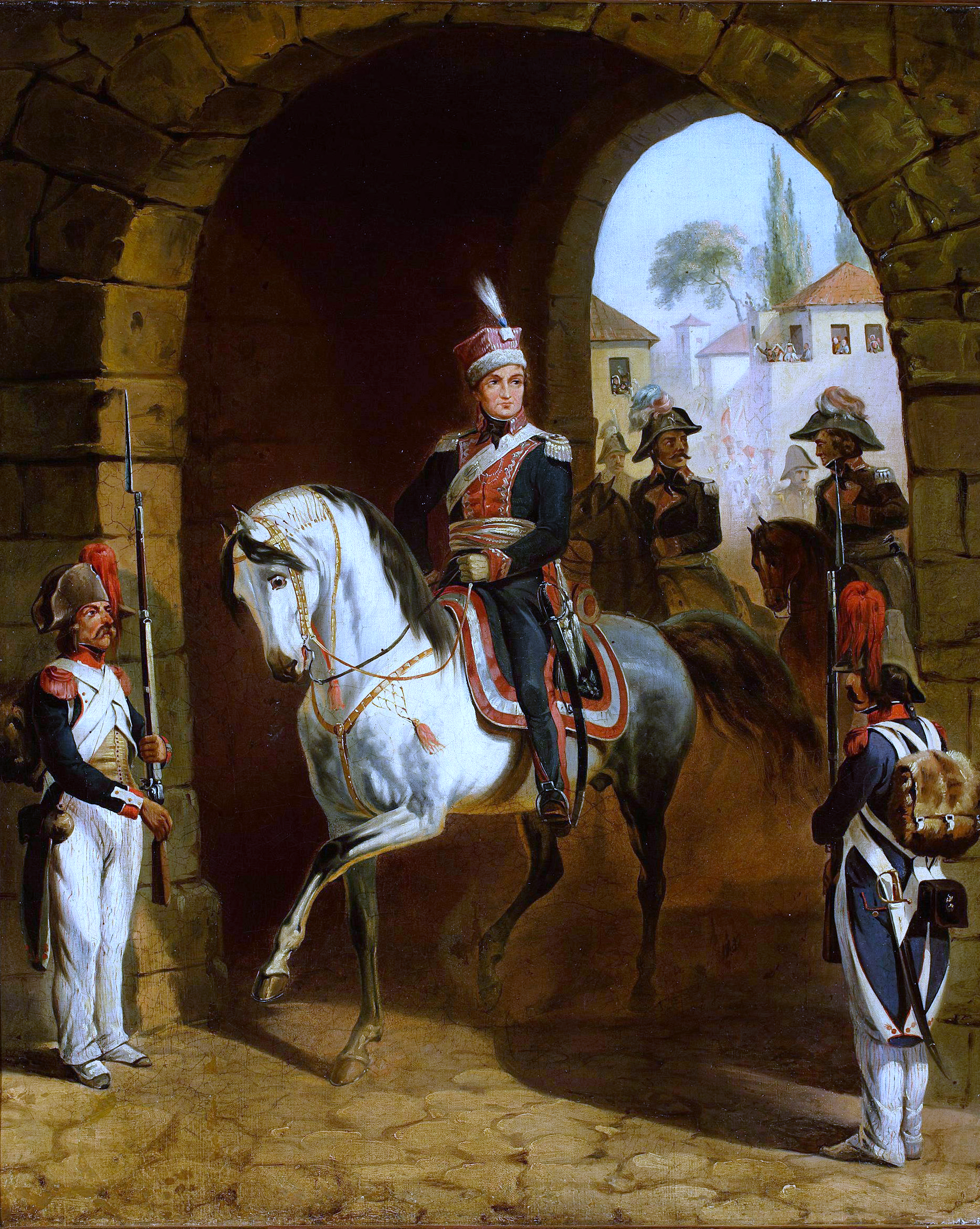
Dąbrowski's entry into Rome through the Porta del Popolo, 3 May 1798. Painting by January Suchodolski in the National Museum in Warsaw

From the time the Legions garrisoned Rome, Dąbrowski obtained a number of trophies from a Roman representative, namely the ones that the Polish king, Jan III Sobieski, had sent there after his victory over the Ottoman Empire at the siege of Vienna in 1683; amongst these was an Ottoman standard which subsequently became part of the Legions' colors, accompanying them from then on. However, the legions were never able to reach Poland and did not liberate the country, as Dąbrowski had dreamed. Napoleon did, however, notice the growing dissatisfaction of his soldiers and their commanders. They were particularly disappointed by a peace treaty between France and Russia signed in Lunéville on 9 February 1801, which dashed Polish hopes of Bonaparte freeing Poland. Shortly afterwards, in March, Dąbrowski reorganized both Legions at Milan into two 6,000-strong units. Disillusioned with Napoleon after the Lunéville treaty, many legionnaires resigned afterwards; of the others, thousands perished when the Legions were sent in the Saint-Domingue expedition in 1803; by that time Dąbrowski was no longer in command of the Legions.

Dąbrowski, meanwhile, spent the first few years of the new century as a general in the service of the Italian Republic and its successor, the Kingdom of Italy. In 1804 he received the Officer cross of Legion of Honour, and the next year, the Italian Order of the Iron Crown. In December 1805, during the War of the Third Coalition, Dąbrowski participated in the Italian blockade of Venice, and was briefly commander of the province of Pescara in the Napoleonic Kingdom of Naples the following year. Together with Józef Wybicki he was summoned again by Napoleon in the fall of 1806 and tasked with recreating the Polish formation, which Napoleon wanted to use to recapture Greater Poland from Prussia, which had joined the Fourth Coalition against France. The ensuing conflict was known as the Greater Poland Uprising, and Dabrowski was the chief leader of Polish insurgent forces. In February 1807, the remaining infantry and cavalry regiments who had continued in French service in Italy were reorganized in Silesia, in the cities of Wrocław, Prudnik, Nysa, Korfantów and Brzeg, into a Polish-Italian Legion (PolaccoItalienne). Dąbrowski distinguished himself at the Siege of Tczew, the Siege of Gdańsk and at the Battle of Friedland.

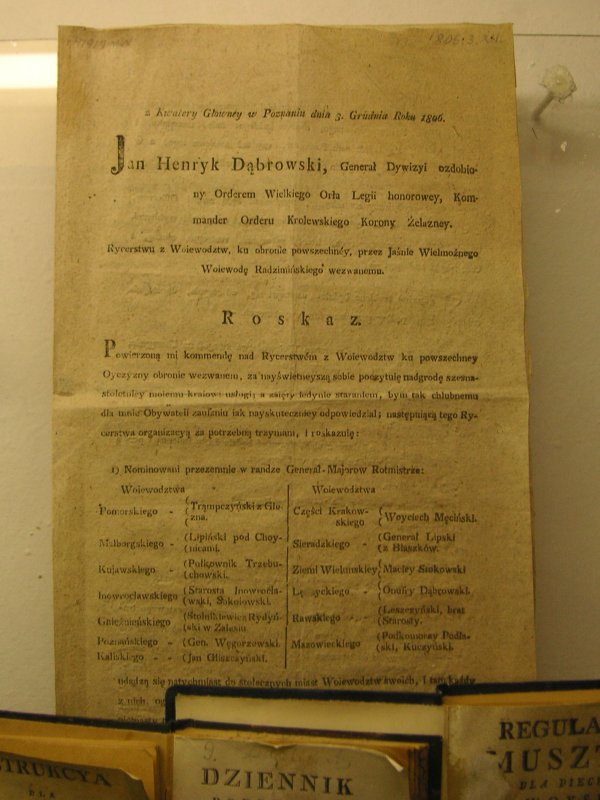
Dąbrowski's order of 1806, introducing a new Order of Battle for the Polish voivodeships

In 1807, the Duchy of Warsaw was established in the recaptured territories, essentially as a satellite of Bonaparte's France. Dąbrowski became disappointed with Napoleon, who offered him monetary rewards, but no serious military or government position. He was also awarded the Virtuti Militari medal that year. In 1809, he set out to defend Poland against an Austrian invasion under the command of Prince Józef Poniatowski. Joining the Army of the Duchy of Warsaw shortly after the Battle of Raszyn, he took part in the first stages of the offensive on Galicia, and then organized the defense of Greater Poland. In June 1812, Dąbrowski commanded the 17th (Polish) Infantry Division in the V Corps of the Grande Armée, during Napoleon's invasion of Russia. He was ordered to besiege Babruysk fortress and to cover the right flank of the French army near Minsk and Mogilev. However, by October the Franco-Russian war was over and the French forces, decimated by a severe winter, had to retreat. At the disastrous Battle of the Berezina in late November that year, Dąbrowski was wounded, and his leadership and tactics in it were criticized.

After the March 1813 reorganization of the Grande Armée, Dąbrowski commanded the 27th (Polish) Infantry Division in the VIII Corps under Poniatowski. During the German campaign of 1813, he led his division at the Battle of Leipzig, where he took command of the VIII Corps on 19 October following Poniatowski's death. On 28 October he became the commander-in-chief of the all remaining Polish troops in French service, succeeding Antoni Paweł Sułkowski. He defended Compiègne in February 1814 during the invasion of France, then led his soldiers back to Poland in May after Napoleon's abdication.

== Final years ==
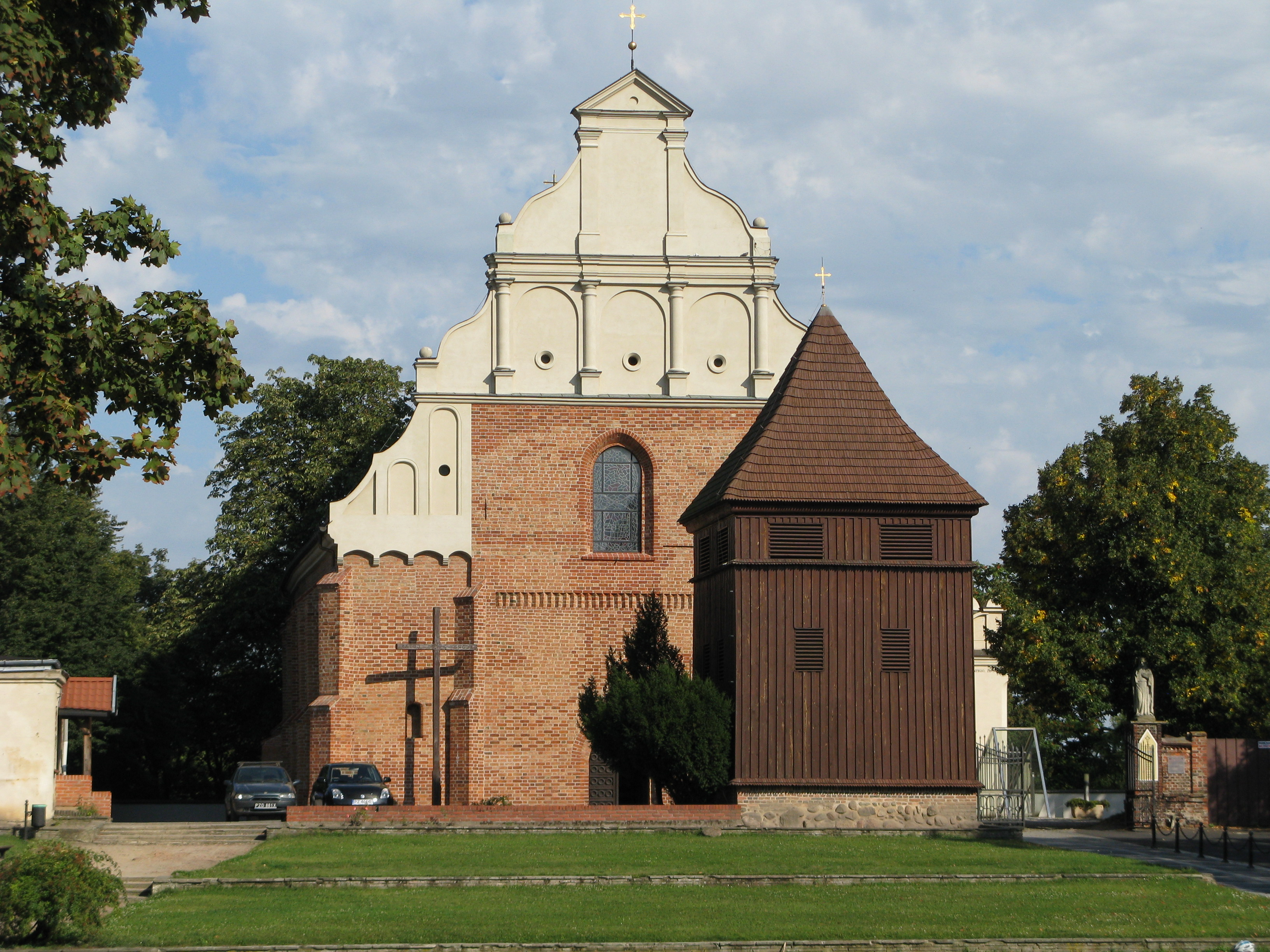
Church of St. Adalbert in Poznań, where Dąbrowski's heart is buried.

Dąbrowski always associated independent Poland with a Polish Army, and offered his services to the new power, which promised to organize such a formation: Russia. He was one of the generals entrusted by the Tsar Alexander of Russia with the reorganization of the Duchy's army into the Army of Congress Poland. In 1815 he received the titles of general of cavalry and senator-voivode of the new Congress Kingdom. He was also awarded the Order of the White Eagle on 9 December that year. Soon afterward he withdrew from active politics. He retired in the following year to his estates in Winna Góra in the Grand Duchy of Posen, Kingdom of Prussia, where he died on 6 June 1818, from a combination of pneumonia and gangrene. His body was laid to rest in the local chapel at Winna Góra, but his heart is buried at the Church of St. Adalbert in Poznań.

Over the years, Dąbrowski wrote several military treatises, primarily about the Legions, in German, French and Polish.

== Legacy ==
Dąbrowski was often criticized by his contemporaries, and by the early Polish historiography, but his image improved with time. He has been often compared to the two other military heroes of the time of Partitions and the Legions, Tadeusz Kościuszko and Józef Poniatowski, and to the father of the Second Polish Republic, Józef Piłsudski. In particular, his mention in the Polish national anthem, also known as "Dąbrowski's Mazurka", contributed to his fame in Poland. It is not uncommon for modern works of Polish history to describe him as a "(national) hero".

Dąbrowski is also remembered outside of Poland for his historical contributions. His name, in the French version "Dombrowsky", is inscribed on the Arc de Triomphe in Paris.

The Polish national anthem, "Poland Is Not Yet Lost", written and first sung by the Polish legionnaires, mentions Dąbrowski by name, and is also known as "Dąbrowski's Mazurka".

== Awards and decorations ==

Order of the White Eagle
Commander's Cross of the Military Medal of the Duchy of Warsaw	Officer of the Legion of Honour (First French Empire)	Saint Helena Medal (posthumous) (Second French Empire)
Knight of the Order of the Iron Crown (Kingdom of Italy)	Order of Saint Vladimir (Russian Empire)	Order of Saint Anna (Russian Empire)

== See also ==
- History of the Polish–Lithuanian Commonwealth (1764–95)
- History of Poland (1795–1918)

== Bibliography ==
- Adam Skałkowski (1939–1946). "Jan Henryk Dąbrowski". Polski Słownik Biograficzny (in Polish). Vol. V.
- Generał Jan Henryk Dąbrowski (1755–1818): Materiały z międzyuczelnianej sesji naukowej UAM iWAP odbytej w Poznaniu 28 III 1969. Uniwersytet im. Adama Mickiewicza. 1970.
- Zych, Gabriel (1964). Jan Henryk Dąbrowski, 1755–1818 (in Polish). Wydawn. Ministerstwa Obrony Narodowej.
- Chisholm, Hugh, ed. (1911). "Dombrowski, Jan Henryk" . Encyclopædia Britannica. Vol. 8 (11th ed.). Cambridge University Press. pp. 395–396.
- Bodart, Gaston (1908). Militär-historisches Kriegs-Lexikon (1618–1905). C. W. Stern. p. 444.
