= 1st Kraków Grenadier Regiment =

Regiment of the insurgent forces in the Kościuszko Uprising in 1794

- 1 Regiment Grenadierów Krakowskich
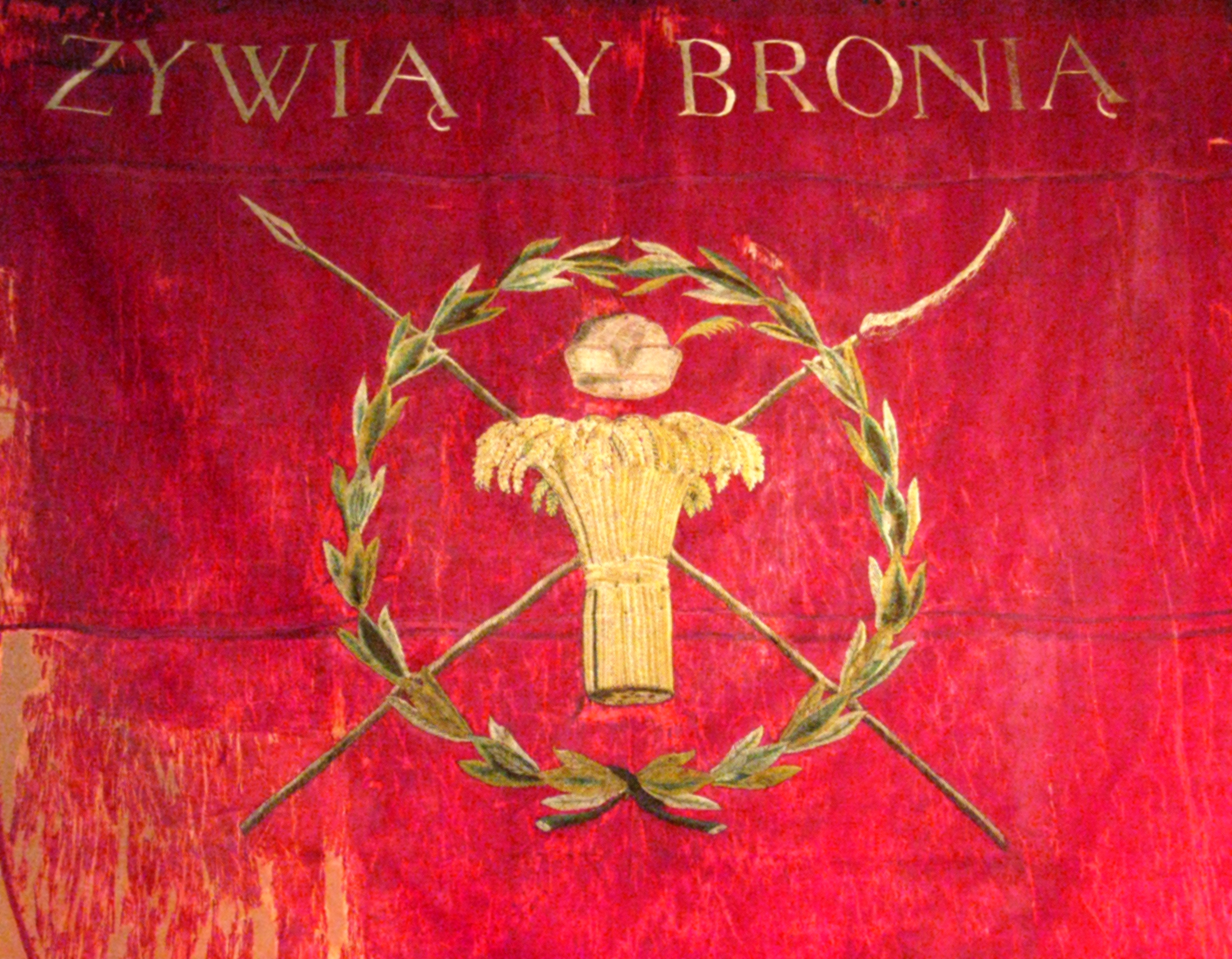
- The banner of the 1st Kraków Grenadier Regiment
- Active: April 1794–10 October 1794
- Allegiance: Polish–Lithuanian Commonwealth (Kościuszko insurgents)
- Branch: Tadeusz Kościuszko's Armed Forces
- Type: Infantry, scythemen
- Size: Regiment
- Motto: They Feed and Defend
- Equipment: War scythes, pikes, rifles
- Engagements: Kościuszko Uprising: Battle of Szczekociny; Siege of Warsaw; Battle of Maciejowice

Commanders
- Commander: Jan Krzycki (until June 1794); Euzebiusz Siemianowski (from June 1794)

The 1st Kraków Grenadier Regiment (Note: Named after the city of Kraków, Poland; English pronunciation: /ˈkrækaʊ, ˈkrækoʊ/ KRAK-ow, KRAK-oh, US also /ˈkreɪkaʊ, ˈkrɑːkaʊ/ KRAY-kow, KRAH-kow, UK also /ˈkrækɒf/ KRAK-of; Polish pronunciation: [ˈkrakuf]; also spelled in English as Cracow, or without Polish diacritics as Krakow.) (Polish: 1 Regiment Grenadierów Krakowskich) was an infantry regiment of the insurgent forces during the Kościuszko Uprising in 1794. Formed from peasants, it was armed with War scythes, pikes, rifles. Founded in April 1794, following the battle of Racławice, and effectively destroyed on 10 October 1794 during the battle of battle of Maciejowice. Its motto, They Feed and Defend, present on its military banner, later has become wildly associated with the uprising, and a patriotic motto of Polish people, being used in the 19th century by pro-independence and peasant movements in Poland.

== History ==
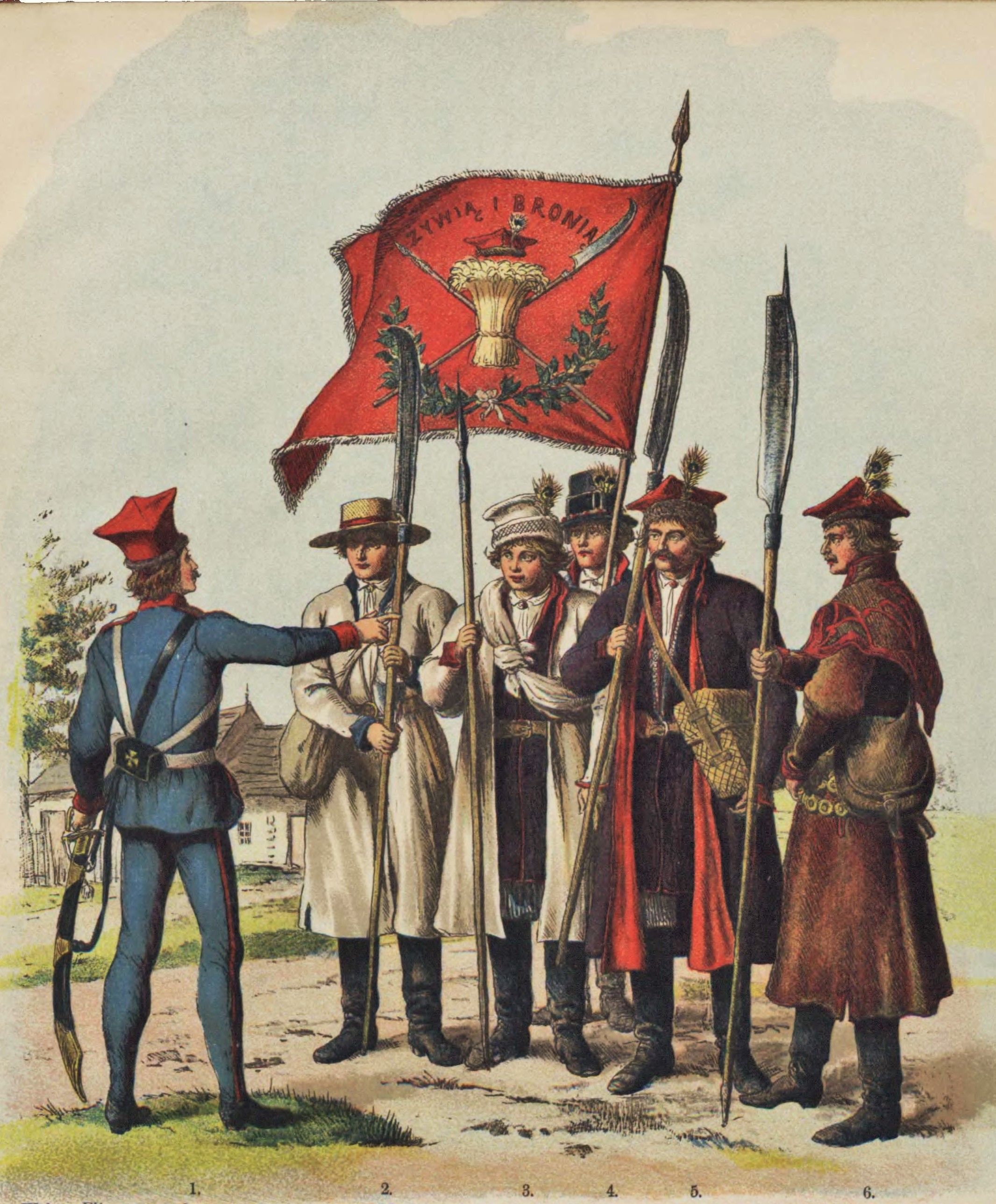
The 1894 painting by Walery Eljasz-Radzikowski, depicting the soldiers of the 1st Kraków Grenadier Regiment in 1794.

On 3 April 1774, a militia formation was created as part of the insurgent forces commanded by Tadeusz Kościuszko during the Kościuszko Uprising. It consisted of peasants drafted to the army from the Kraków Voivodeship, and was commanded by Jan Śląski. The formation was armed with war scythes and pikes. The following day, on 4 April, the unit counting 300 soldiers, participated in the battle of Racławice, which ended with the insurgent victory. Following the battle, a sizable portion of its soldiers deserted. The 1st Grenadier Regiment was established following the battle, from the remaining soldiers of the militia. The 1st Kraków Grenadier Regiment was commanded by colonel Jan Krzycki. Together with war scythes and pikes, the unit was also armed with 120 rifles captured in the battle of Racławice. Its uniform consisted of dark blue jackets with green revers, and traditional or czechczery-type white pants made from broadcloth, and rogatywka-type hats. The unit was divided into two battalions, the second being commanded by lieutenant colonel Euzebiusz Siemianowski.

The regiment never achieved its planned size. By the end of April, the unit counted 926 soldiers, and by 27 May, it decreased to 876. In May, the 2nd Kraków Grenadier Regiment was also founded. The first regiment suffered heavy casualties in the battle of battle of Szczekociny, fought on 6 June, with its numbers decreasing to 663 soldiers, later further falling to 540 in July, and to 537 in August. Following the battle, Siemianowski was granted the command over the entire regiment, after Krzycki was moved to the 9th Infantry Regiment. In July, the unit supported Karol Sierakowski's Division, and by the end of the month, it had 413 soldiers. On 16 August, the commander-in-chief of armed forces, Tadeusz Kościuszko, honored the regiment in Warsaw, by granting it a red military banner, featuring the motto They Feed and Defend (Polish: Żywią i Bronią, original spelling: Żywią y Bronią) on it. In August, the regiment fought in the siege of Warsaw in August. It took part in successful skirmishes in Szczęśliwice between 17 and 18 August, and in Wola on 25 August, during which it captured cannons from the Prussian Army. The regiment lost almost all of its soldiers in the Battle of Maciejowice fought on 10 October. The surviving soldiers retreated from the battlefield under the command of major Józef Szumański to Praga. They carried with them their military banner.

== Symbols ==
The unit possessed a red military banner and a motto, both granted to it on 16 August 1794 by the commander-in-chief of armed forces, Tadeusz Kościuszko. In its centre, it included a golden a bundle of hay with a rogatywka-type hat placed above it, and with a pike and war scythe crossed behind it. The symbols are surrounded by a laurel wreath. An inscription in Polish is placed above the graphic. It features the motto of the unit, spelled with golden capital letters, which reads Żywią y Bronią. It corresponds to Żywią i Bronią in the modern orthography and translates to They Feed and Defend. The motto came from the origin of the unit's soldiers as farmers.

Currently, the banner is displayed in the Polish Army Museum in Warsaw. The unit's motto, They Feed and Defend, later became wildly associated with the uprising, and later a patriotic motto of Polish people, being used in the 19th century by pro-independence and peasant movements in Poland.

== Gallery ==
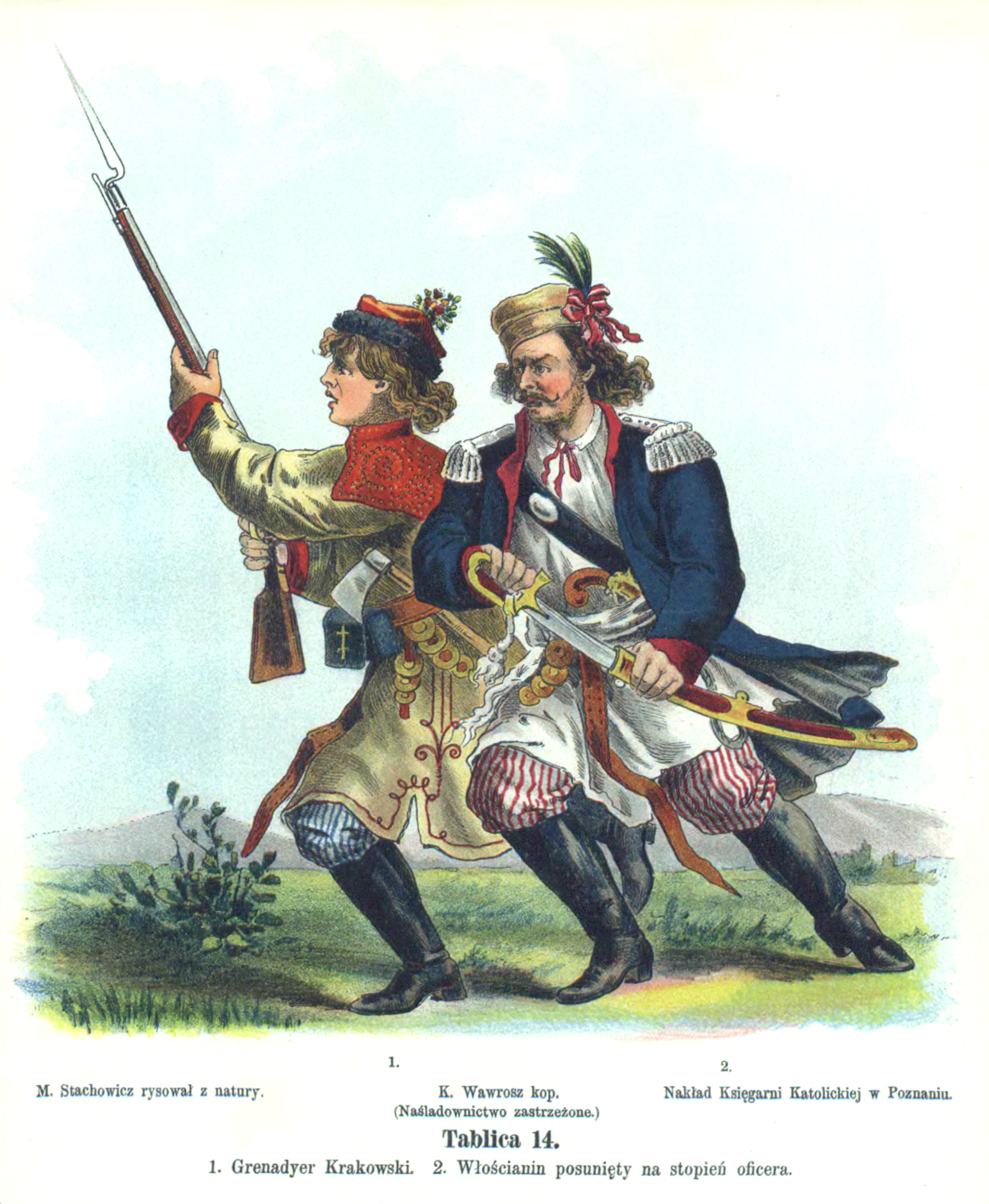
The 1909 illustration by Walery Eljasz-Radzikowski, depicting the Kraków Grenadiers.

== See also ==
- 2nd Kraków Grenadier Regiment
