= 2nd Kraków Grenadier Regiment =

- 2 Regiment Grenadierów Krakowskich
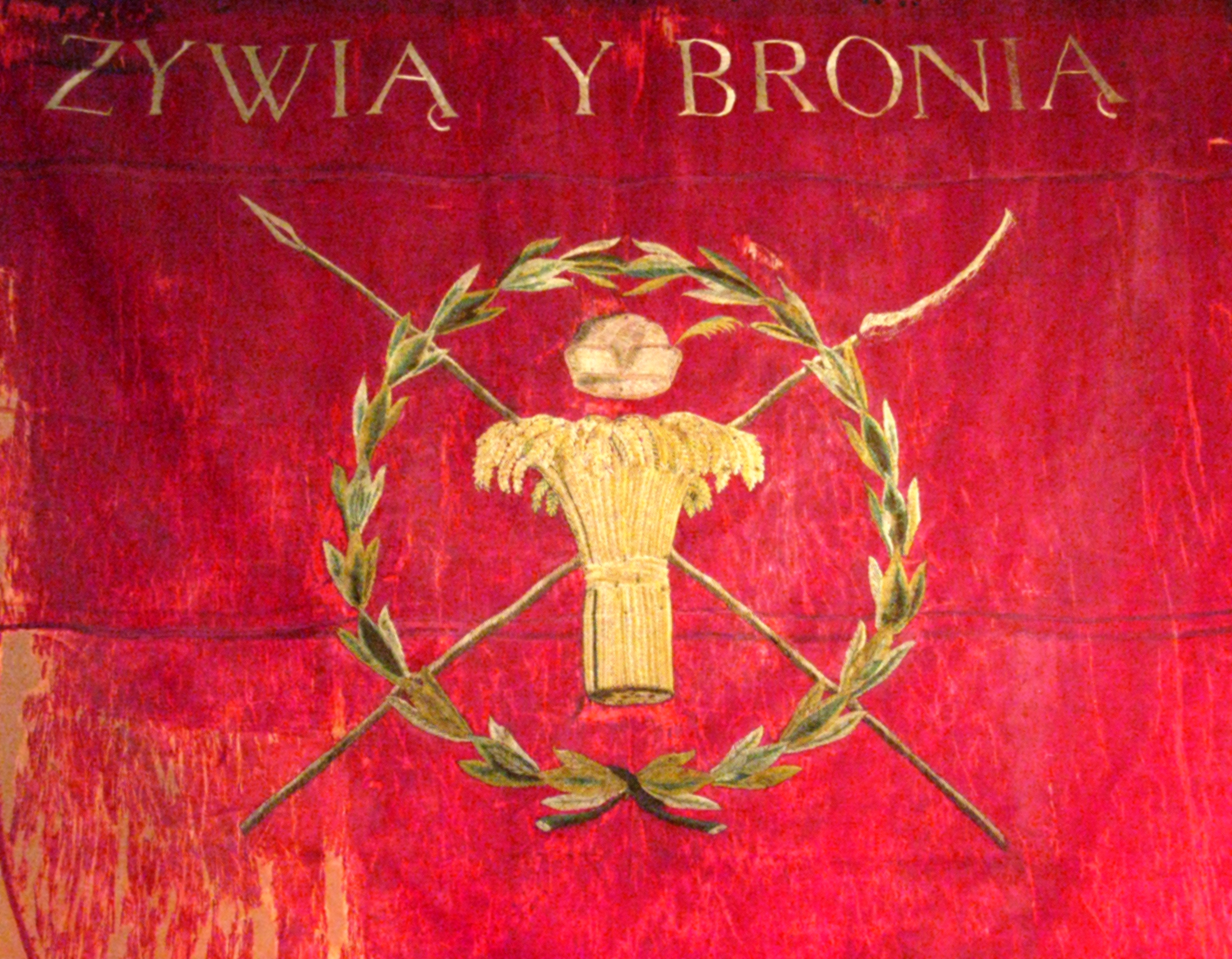
- Banner of the regiment.
- Active: 1794
- Disbanded: 1794
- Allegiance: Kościuszko insurrects
- Type: Infantry, scythemen
- Size: Regiment
- Mottos: They Feed and Defend (Polish: Żywią i Bronią, original spelling: Żywią y Bronią)
- Weapons: War scythes, rifles
- Campaigns: Kościuszko Uprising

Commanders
- First commander: Franciszek Bukowski

2nd Kraków Grenadier Regiment (Note: Polish: 2 Regiment Grenadierów Krakowskich) was a scythemen regiment of the insurrection army during the Kościuszko Uprising in 1794.

== History ==
Both 1st and 2nd regiments were formed in 1794 after battle of Racławice out of all remaining scythemen who stayed with the insurgent army after the battle. Soldiers of the regiments wore rogatywka peaked caps, navy blue jackets with green revers and czechczery or white broadcloth-made trousers. The units were equipped with 300 rifles and never reached the planned number of soldiers or unitary look of the uniforms.

On 16 August 1794, Tadeusz Kościuszko, leader of the uprising, gave the regiment the red banner with They Feed and Defend (Polish: Żywią i Bronią, original spelling: Żywią y Bronią) motto on it. Nowadays the banner is associated as a symbol of the Kościuszko Uprising. Currently it is kept in Polish Army Museum, Warsaw.

== Commanders ==
- Colonel Franciszek Bukowski
- Colonel Ludwik Krupiński
- Colonel Władysław Franciszek Jabłonowski

== Gallery ==
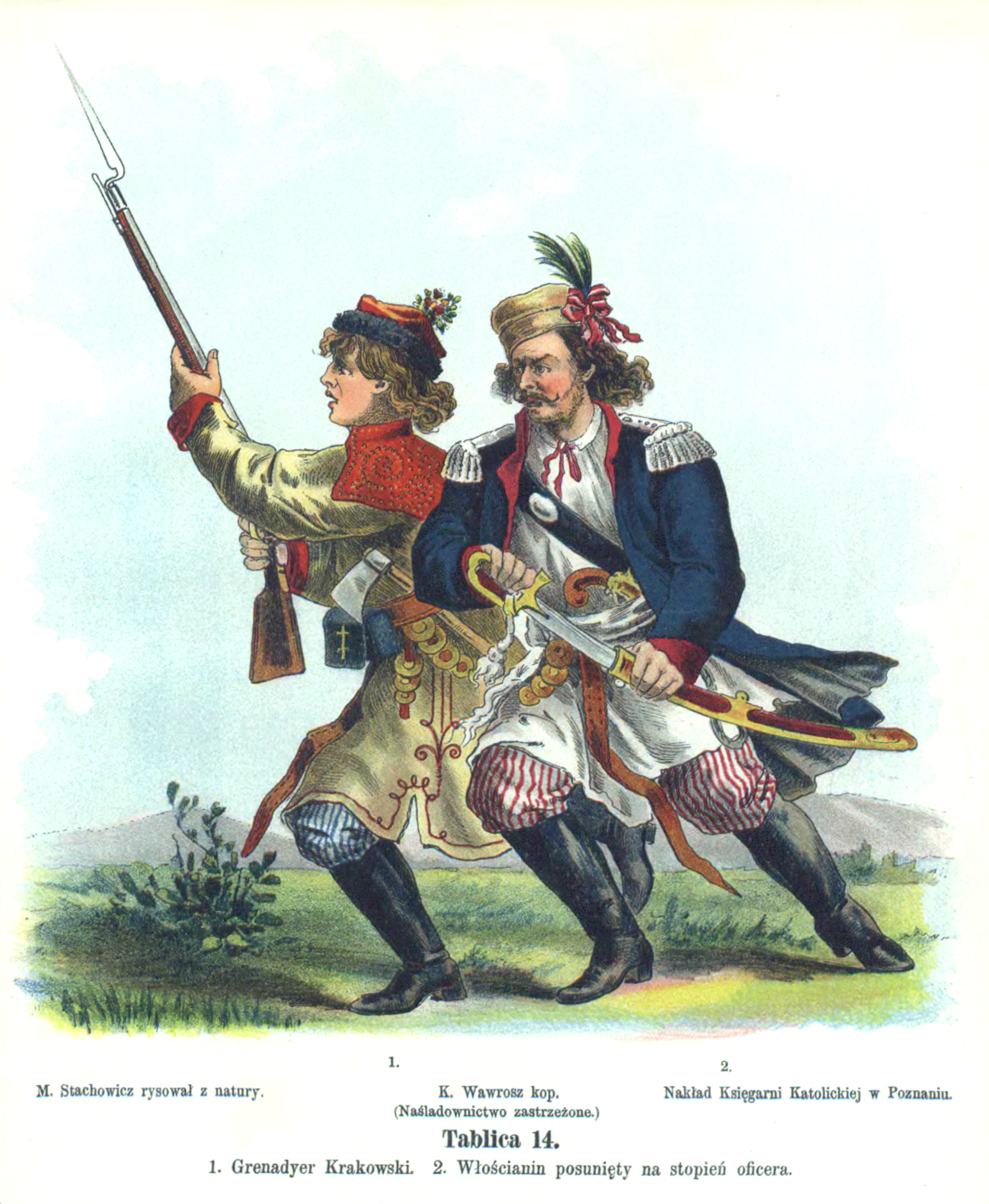
Illustration by Walery Eljasz Radzikowski depicting Kraków Grenadiers.

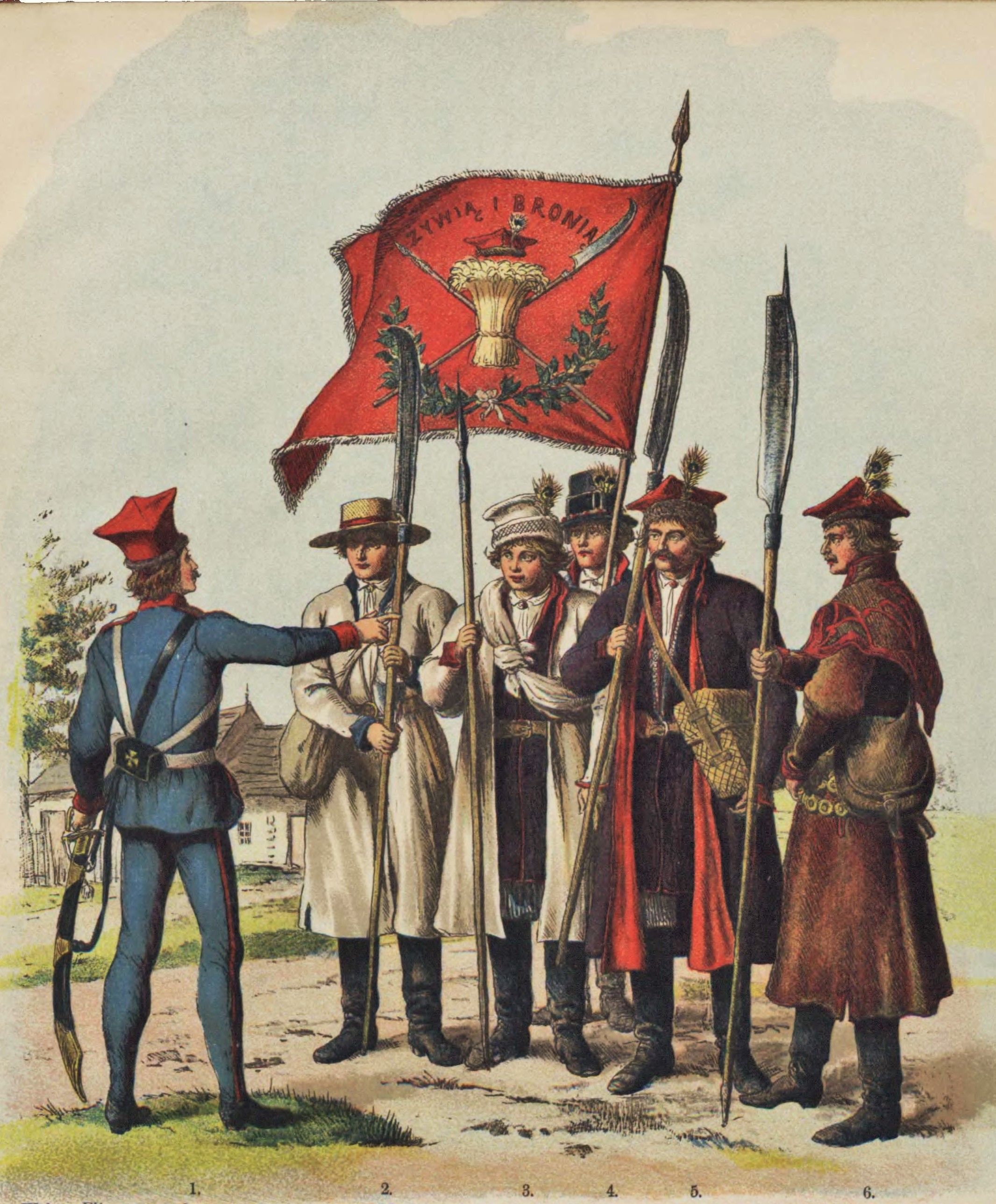
Painting Kościuszko's Polish Army in 1794 by Walery Eljasz Radzikowski depicting scythemen officer, 3 scythemens, pikemen and standard-bearer with banner of the regiment.

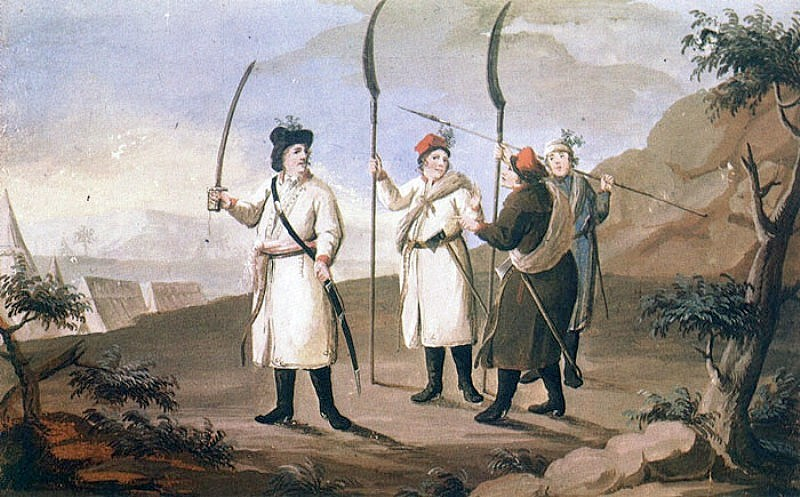
Painting by Michał Stachowicz depicting scythemen in 1794.
