= Kościuszko in Racławice =

Jan Matejko painting

- Kościuszko pod Racławicami
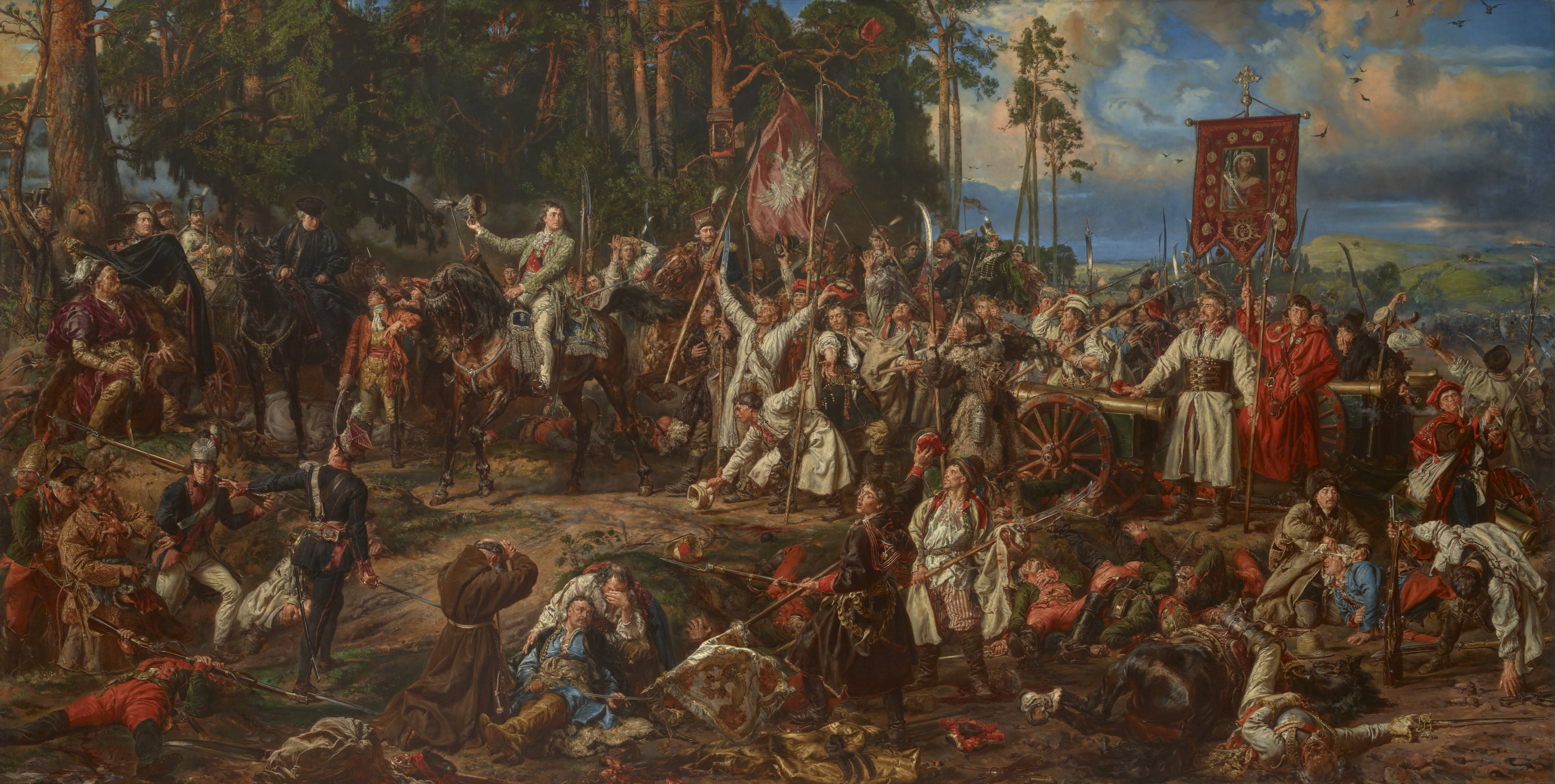
- Artist: Jan Matejko
- Medium: Oil painting
- Movement: History painting
- Dimensions: 465 × 897 cm
- Location: National Museum in Kraków

Kościuszko in Racławice (Polish: Kościuszko pod Racławicami) is an oil painting of the Battle of Racławice of 1794, painted by Jan Matejko in 1888, exhibited in the Gallery of 19th Century Polish Art in the Sukiennice Museum (Kraków).

== Description of the painting ==
The interpretation of the painting was greatly influenced by Marian Gorzkowski's feuilleton Hints to Jan Matejko's latest painting "Kościuszko in Racławice", finished in April 1888.

Tadeusz Kościuszko is dressed in a fashionable uniform tailcoat, identical to that in Michał Stachowicz's painting Kościuszko's Oath on the Main Square, which depicts the scene of Kościuszko's proclamation which occurred the prior month. Father Antoni Gruszecki, then vicar at St. Mary's Church, later parish priest of Podgórze and papal chamberlain, served as a model. The second hero of the Battle of Racławice, Bartosz Głowacki, is depicted with a cap on a captured cannon. The co-organizer of the uprising, Hugo Kołłątaj, is dressed in black and sitting on a black horse (although he did not take part in the battle).

According to Matejko, the two generals at the head of the staff, Antoni Madaliński and Józef Zajączek (wearing a Napoleonic cap and leaning against a tree), also deserved to be presented. Matejko painted a very beautiful noble costume for Stefan Dembowski, who was to be his successor in the event of Kościuszko's death. In the painting, it also symbolizes the reluctance of the Polish nobility to join the uprising, and especially to follow the Commander's orders, which were regularly sabotaged.

== History of the painting ==
The Matejko Jubilee Committee which intended to purchase his painting Jan Sobieski pod Wiedniem (Jan Sobieski at Vienna) collected funds to purchase that painting, but during the celebration of the 200th anniversary of the relief of Vienna, Matejko announced that he had decided to donate the painting to the Pope on behalf of the Polish nation. This decision surprised the committee, which, after an extraordinary meeting on 13 September 1883 announced that it would ask Matejko to paint a copy of the painting; and if he did not agree, to paint another painting with historical content, which would be donated to the National Museum in Kraków. The collection of funds from donations for that initiative continued, and that by 1 November 1883 anyone who made a contribution would be able to request a refund. In December 1883, the committee reported that only 360 of the 32,234 Austro-Hungarian guldens collected by 1 December had been withdrawn.

Matejko decided to paint Kościuszko in Racławice in 1884. It was preceded by pencil sketches (six of which are preserved to this day in the National Museum in Kraków) and an oil sketch, currently in the National Museum in Warsaw. In February 1887, the canvas was brought from Paris and hung in the studio in the building of the Academy of Fine Arts. On 12 March 1887 Matejko began working on the final shape of the painting. He probably encountered some difficulties, because he interrupted his work until 20 August and went once again to Racławice to make landscape sketches from nature. The second break in his work occurred in February 1888 and was caused by his serious illness. Ultimately, the work was completed at the end of April the same year. In May 1888, preparations for the construction of the picture frame began. The cost of the frame was 3,000 guldens, and the work was supervised by Władysław Chrośnikiewicz.

The painting was handed over on 14 May 1888 in the hall of the National Museum in the Cloth Hall (Kraków) in the presence of invited guests. Matejko and the committee members stood under the hanging painting. Matejko spoke first and said that he was very happy that he had managed to keep the promise he had made five years earlier. The chairman of the committee, Artur Potocki, thanked Matejko for "this great work of art and thought". He then submitted a report on the fundraising. The largest amount, over 20,000, was collected in Galicia. Money was also transferred from the Duchy of Poznań, Royal Prussia, Silesia, Bukowina, England, Sweden, Turkey, Australia and America. A total of 49,807 guldens was collected, which, as Potocki emphasized, did not cover the value of the painting. The committee retained the right to show the painting at exhibitions, and Matejko retained the right to reproduce the work. The Committee transferred the money to Matejko in installments. In November 1883, he transferred 20,000 guldens to the artist as an "advance", another installment of 15,000 was transferred in May 1884, and another 20,000 on 25 March 1887.

In June, the painting was sent to Lviv for the exhibition of the United Society of Friends of Fine Arts and exhibited in the George Hotel, then in Poznań, and in 1889 it was shown in Vienna and at the Exposition Universelle in Paris.

In May 1888, a department of the Kościuszko Society, in gratitude for the painting, decided to award Matejko the title of honorary member for the first time in the history of the association.

The Artistic and Literary Circle in Kraków proposed, with the artist's consent, to make a reproduction of the painting. To raise funds for this, a festival was organized during which peasants who were the painter's extras appeared in a tableau vivant. Over 4,000 people took part in the festival and the income was 630 guldens. As part of the campaign of the Artistic and Literary Circle to get the painting into people's homes, in 1888 Juliusz Kossak prepared a watercolor based on the painting, which was popularized as a chromolithographic print. The first edition, of 12,000 copies, sold out within a few months. In the spring of 1889, a second edition was published.

From 1890 to 1894, Józef Hakowski made a silver bas-relief Kościuszko in Racławice after a painting by Jan Matejko, commissioned by Juliusz Przeworski, which is currently in the Hungarian National Museum in Budapest.

Russian censorship did not allow Warsaw magazines to publish articles about the painting, even critical ones.

== See also ==
- Racławice Panorama

== Bibliography ==
- Halina Blak (1983), Kościuszko pod Racławicami Jana Matejki, Warsaw: KAW, ISBN 83-03-00231-7, OCLC 823777165
