= Battle of Szczekociny =

Battle of the Kościuszko Uprising

Coordinates: 50.6275°N 19.8253°E

- Part of the Kościuszko Uprising
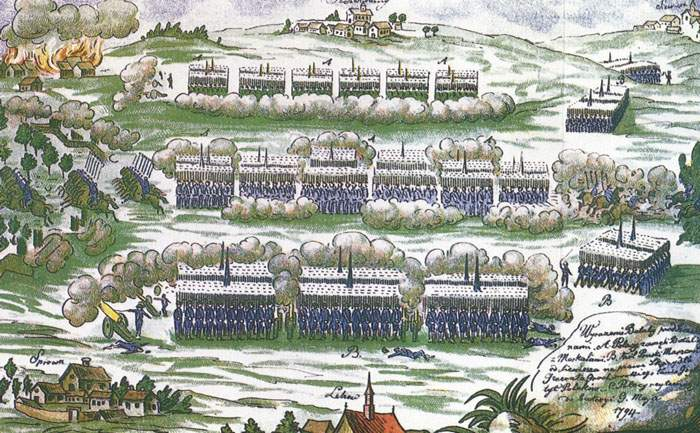
- Battle of Szczekociny, 1794, by Michał Stachowicz
Date	6 June 1794
Location	Szczekociny
Result	Russo-Prussian victory

Belligerents
Poland	Prussia; Russia

Commanders and leaders
Tadeusz Kościuszko (WIA)	(Kingdom of Prussia) Francis Favrat (Russian Empire) Fyodor Denisov

Strength
15,000; 24 guns	26,500 (17,500 Prussians and 9,000 Russians); 124 guns

Casualties and losses
1,200+	687+

The Battle of Szczekociny was fought on the 6 June 1794 near the town of Szczekociny, Lesser Poland, between Poland and the combined forces of the Russian Empire and Kingdom of Prussia. Polish forces were led by Tadeusz Kościuszko, and the Russians and Prussians by Alexander Tormasov, future eminent general of the Napoleonic Wars. Tormasov was aided by Prussian General Francis Favrat, who emphasized the use of artillery, which put Russian-Prussian forces in the advantage.

== Background ==
Following the Russian defeat at the Battle of Raclawice, the Prussians entered Poland to help confront the Polish revolt. Prussia and Russia were threatened by the sanctuary Poland offered serfs and Prussia was additionally threatened by their burghers lured to Poland's promise of democracy and free-market economy.

On the morning of the 6 June, General Wodzicki noted, "It is impossible that Denisov could have amassed such an army. My eyes must be wrong, but I can see Prussians." Kosciuszko had received assurances the Prussians would remain neutral. Russian forces were placed on the left wing, while Prussian army was located on the right wing.

== Battle ==
The combined Russo-Prussian forces of 26,500 were victorious, defeating Kosciuszko's army of 15,000 with cannon fire. Polish peasant hero, Wojciech Bartosz Głowacki, died of the wounds he sustained during this battle. Other Polish military commanders who took part in the battle were General Adam Poninski, General Antoni Madalinski, General Jan Grochowski and Duke Eustachy Sanguszko. Apart from Glowacki, two other Polish generals also died in the battle: Jozef Wodzicki and Jan Grochowski.

Found on the battlefield by General Sanguszko, the wounded Kosciuszko stated, "I want to die here", as he was ridden to safety.

== Aftermath ==
Kosciuszko's rebels retreated to Warsaw while the combined Russian and Prussian force captured Kraków on the 15 June. Austria then invaded Poland from the south. The Polish insurrectionists were reduced to defending Warsaw.
