= Fauchard =

Type of polearm

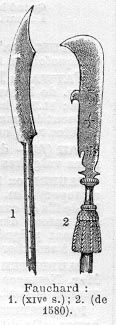
1. 1300s fauchard; 2. 1580 fauchard

A fauchard is a type of polearm which was used in Europe from the 11th through the 17th centuries. In later use fauchards became ornamental and ceremonial (fauchard de parade), growing in size until some examples were almost too heavy to carry, let alone use. The design consisted of a curved blade atop a long pole, although in some portrayals, it is shown on a shorter pole. The blade bore a moderate to strong curve along its length. The cutting edge was only on the convex side of the blade, unlike the guisarme or bill. The fauchard was likely developed from the war scythe (and is from the scythe (falx) family in general) with the cutting edge turned opposite, convex instead of concave, so that the weapon was good for both thrusting and slashing attacks.

Pole arms developed from relatively few early tools (axe, scythe/wide-bladed knife, and the pruning hook) and the spear. Thus naming, particularly of early forms, is difficult. Fauchard, as a name, is from early French and may have been used to describe various arms. The sovnya may have been a localized term for the same medieval weapon. In later historical text, the terms glaive (possibly Welsh) and fauchard are used to describe the same weapons. Over time, the form evolved and elements from other pole-arms were included in the fauchard, such as prongs to parry weapons and hook armor, complicating naming further. Some historians use only the classification "glaive" or "fauchard" and ignore the other entirely.

The form of contemporary Asian pole arms (the Japanese naginata and the Chinese guan dao for example) has led to speculation that one could have influenced the other as regional trade brought the cultures together.

From the Dictionnaire Encyclopédique Larousse (1898):

Fauchard: A large iron "hand weapon" (vs. throwing weapon) with the form of a bill, the back, which is opposite to the longest curve, is straight or concave, while the cutting edge is convex. The fauchard differs from the guisarme by the direction of its edge and its point, generally projected in the rear, and of the war scythe by the dimension and the nature of the curves. The very old fauchards generally carry on their backs horizontal bumps or hooks directed from top to bottom and used to pull people by the projections of their armor. The length of the shaft varied between 8 and 12 feet, that of the iron 1 to 2 feet. The fauchard is a weapon of a foot soldier that was in use from the thirteenth to the fifteenth century. It is very difficult to make the exact departure between the fairly recent fauchards, which until the eighteenth century remained in use as a weapon of ramparts, and the war scythes, couteau de breche, etc.

The fauchard was also described in the "Poem of the Combat of the Thirty" (Le Poème du combat des Trente): "Huceton of Clamanban fought with a fauchart / Which was cutting (bladed) on one side, hooked on the other side".

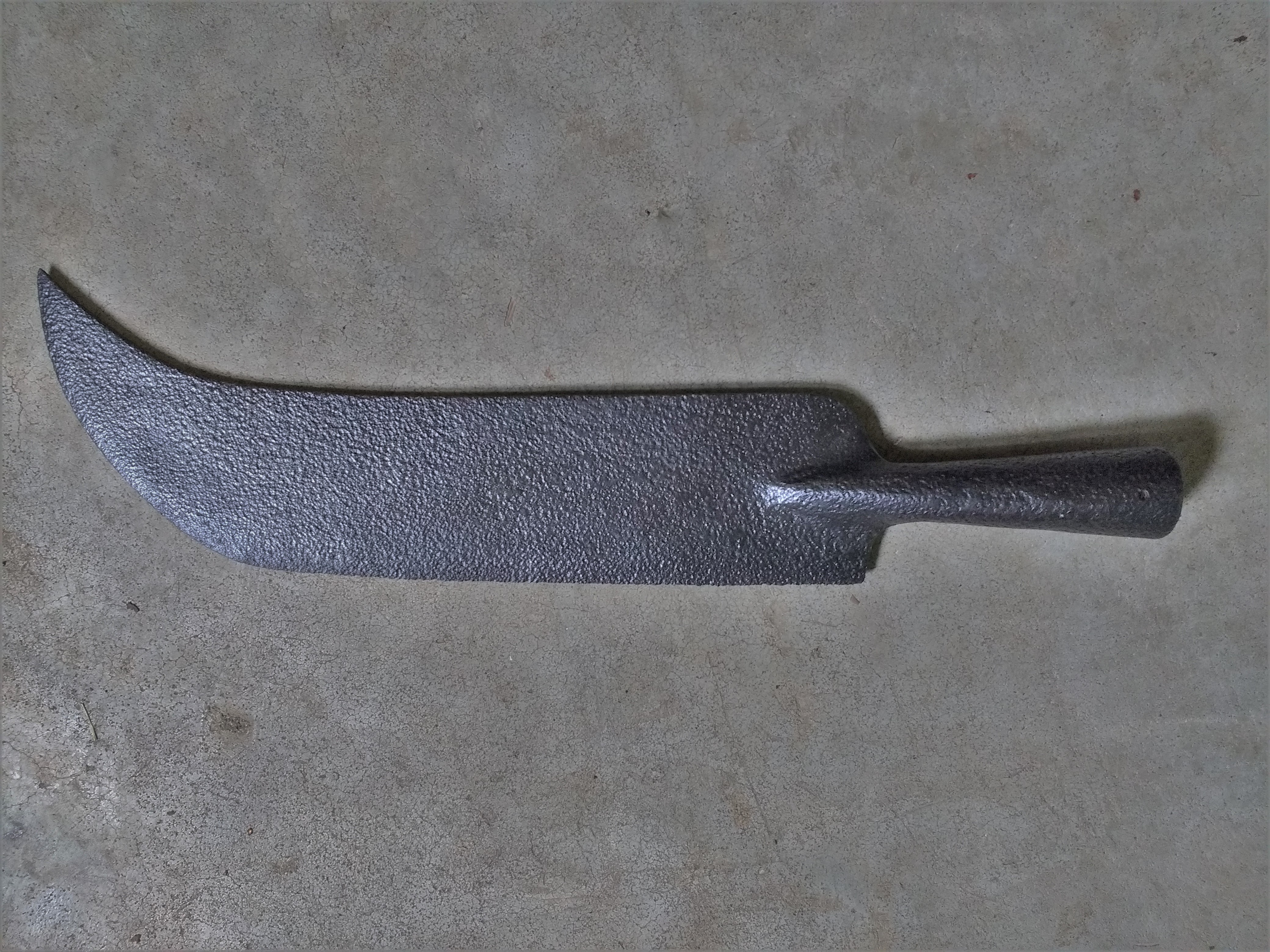
"Coupe-marc", a French agricultural tool from the 19th or 20th century, often mislabeled as a fauchard. Most polearms originated from pole-mounted agricultural tools because of their heft and reach.

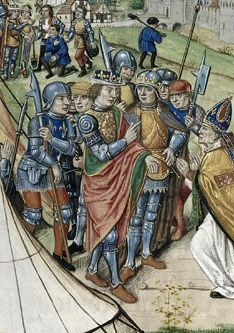
Soldiers with various polearms including a fauchard and glaive

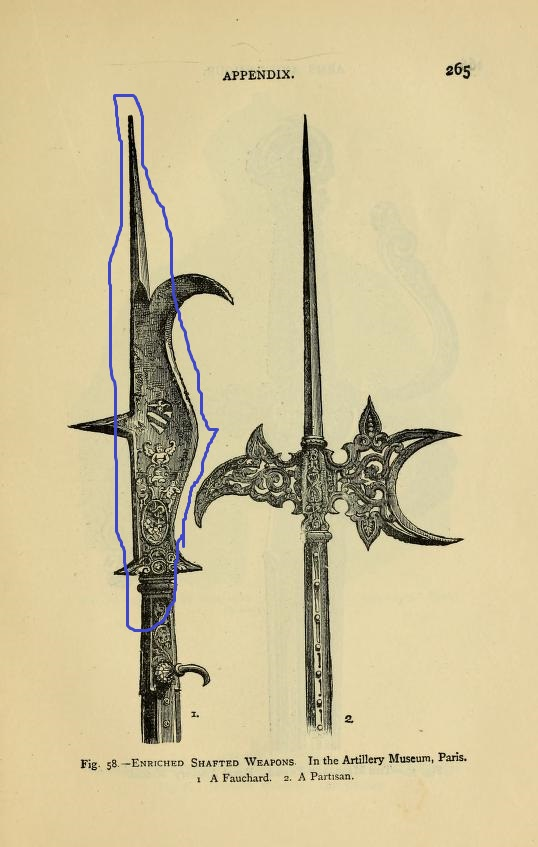
Weapons in a French museum, illustrating differing name usage between languages. Left: A weapon called a fauchard, resembling a bill. Right: An ornate crescent-bladed halberd labelled "partisan".

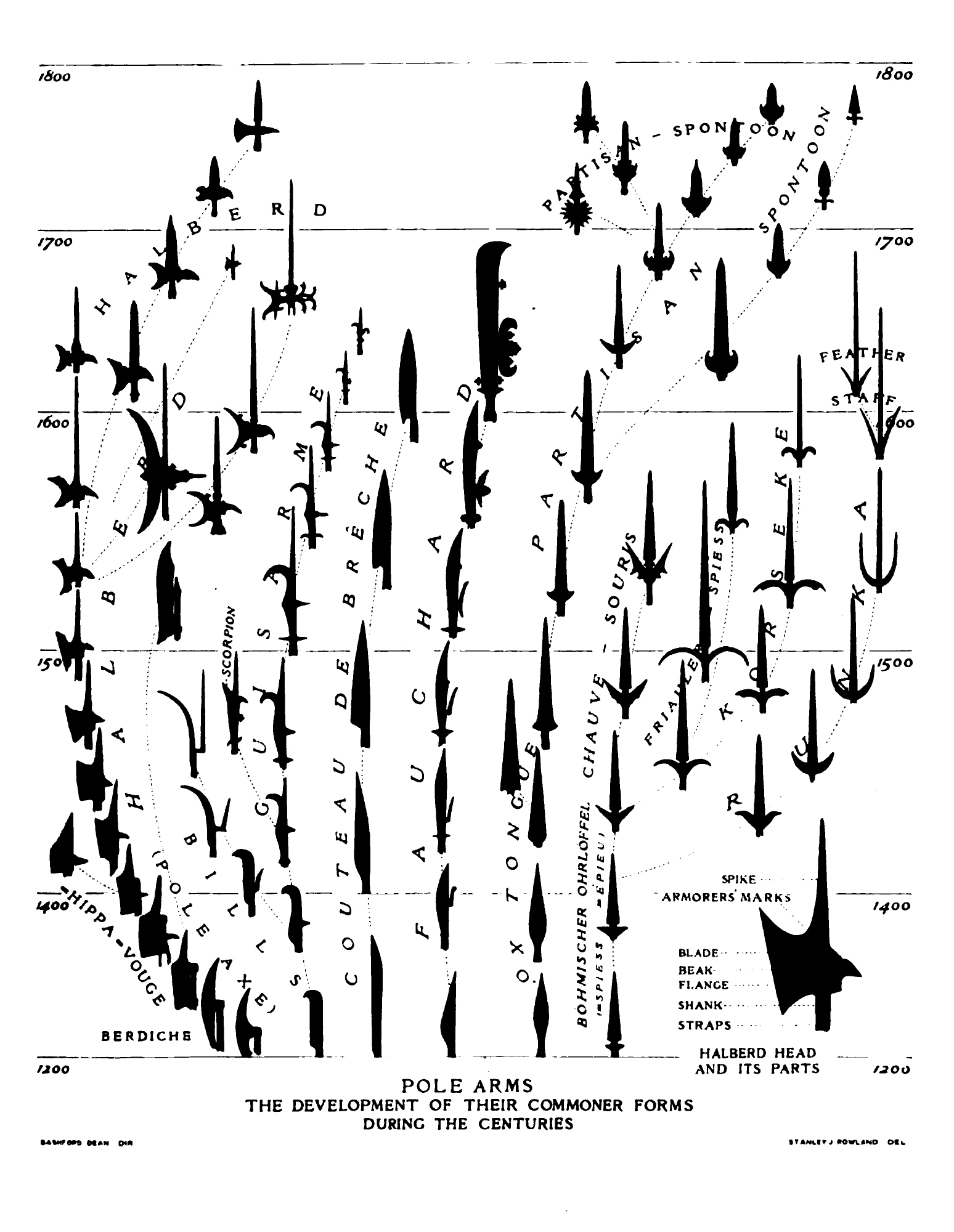
Pole Arms: The Development of Their Commoner Forms During the Centuries (fauchards are near the middle)
