= Wojciech Bartosz Głowacki =

Polish peasant soldier

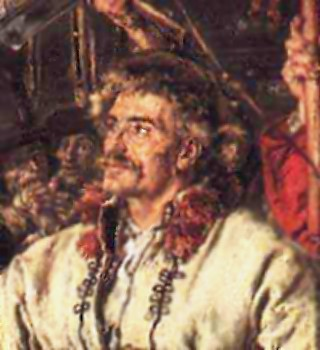
- Detail of Głowacki from Jan Matejko's Battle of Racławice
- Born: Wojciech Bartosz c. 1758; Rzendowitz, Prussian Silesia
- Died: 1794 (aged 35–36); Lesser Poland Province, Polish–Lithuanian Commonwealth
- Cause of death: Injuries sustained in battle
- Spouse: Jadwiga Czernikowa (m. 1783–1794)
- Children: 3
- Military career
- Allegiance: Polish–Lithuanian Commonwealth
- Rank: Chorąży
- Unit: Kosynierzy
- Conflicts: Battle of Racławice; Battle of Szczekociny

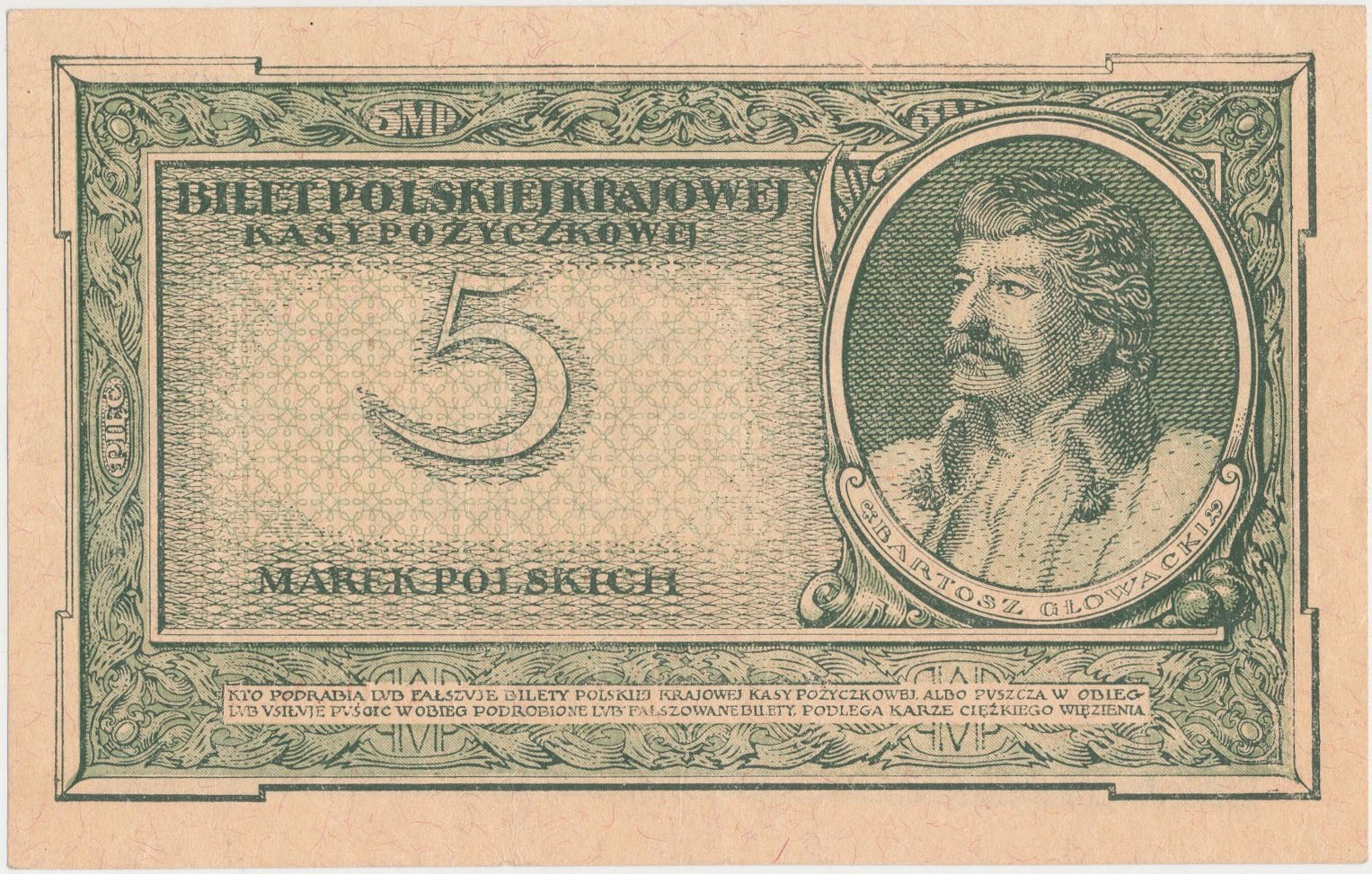
1919 Mp.5 banknote

Wojciech Bartos(z) Głowacki (1758–1794), known also as Bartosz Głowacki, was a Polish peasant and the most famous member of the kosynierzy (peasant infantry) during the Kościuszko Uprising in 1794. Born as Wojciech Bartosz, he became a Polish national hero during the battle of Racławice on 4 April 1794, when he captured a Russian cannon by putting out the fuse with his hat. For this, he was promoted to the rank of chorąży and received the surname 'Głowacki'. He was mortally wounded during the Battle of Szczekociny on 6 June that year. Since then he has become one of the symbols of the Uprising and Polish valor.

== Biography ==
Bartosz was born around 1765 as a serf of Antoni Szujski. He was probably born in the village of Rzędowice, although some sources give Zakrzów as his place of birth. As the church documents which would have recorded the details were destroyed in 1794, the exact place of his birth, as well as the date are uncertain.

In 1783 he married Jadwiga Czernikowa, and they had three daughters (Helena, Cecylia and Justyna). They were poor, and their house collapsed some years before the death of Jadwiga (she was then a widow). Their field was between 4 and 9 morgs, without a horse, and it was only after Bartosz became famous at Racławice that they received a cow and some other animals from Lord Szujski.

Bartosz was conscripted after the decree of the Commission of Order (Komisja Porządkowa) of 25 March, which ordered the conscription of one man from every five 'chimneys'. In the supplementary decree of 28 March, the commission allowed the peasants to report with scythes instead of more specialized weapons; this led to the creation of the scythe-wielding kosynierzy infantry regiments.

Bartosz was chosen as a conscript, ironically, because his lord's administrative staff viewed him as a troublemaker and decided that sending him off to war was a good way to get rid of him. He arrived in the military camp at the beginning of April, and on 4 April he took part in the famous Battle of Racławice, where Tadeusz Kościuszko, leader of the Polish uprising, defeated the Russian army. The kosynierzy were vital to the Polish victory, as they swarmed the Russian artillery positions, overrunning them after only a single salvo.

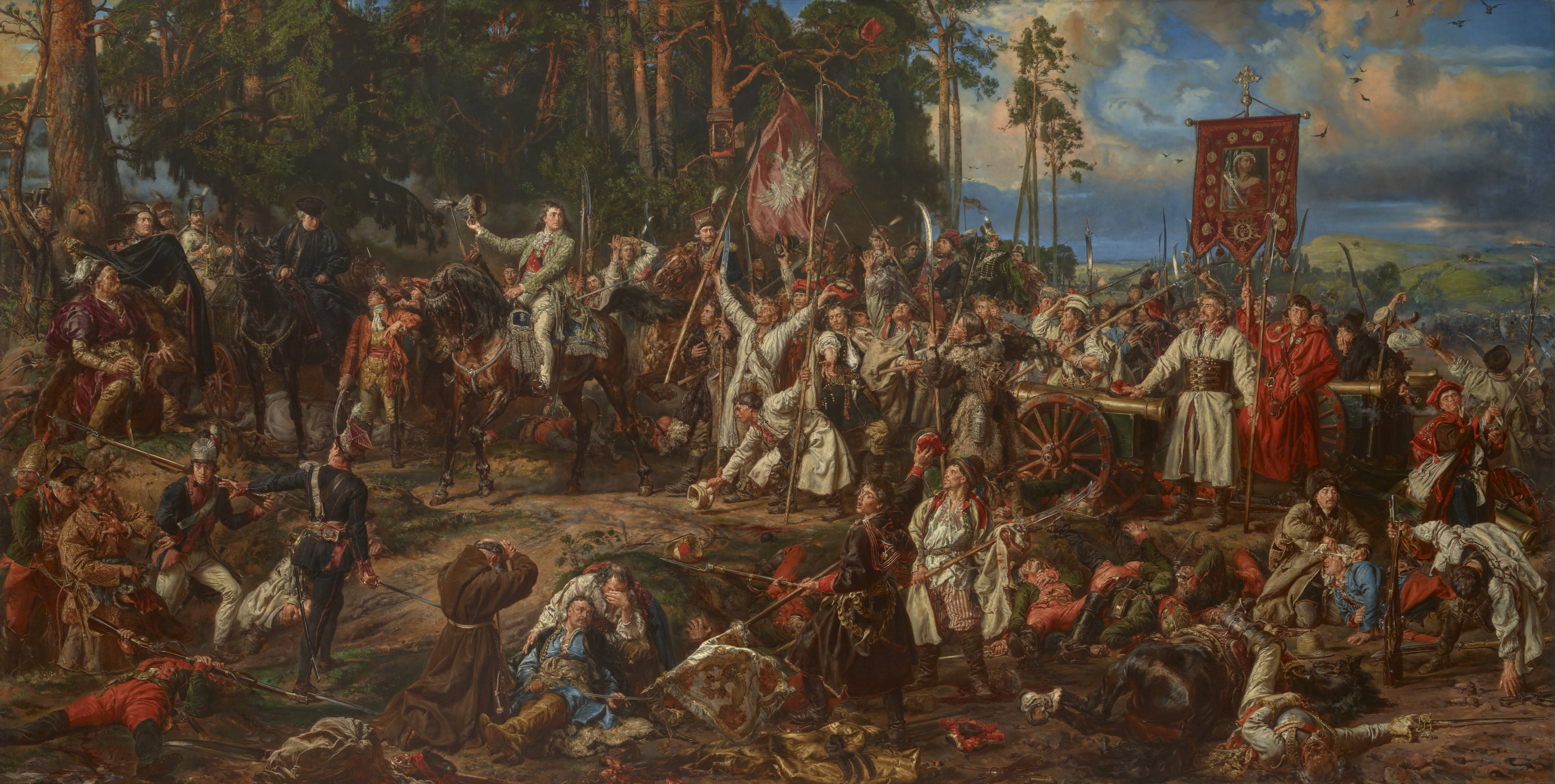
Bartosz Głowacki with his cap on the captured cannon. Battle of Racławice, painting by Jan Matejko.

It was at that battle that Bartosz gained fame: he was the first to reach the enemy lines and stopped one of the cannons from shooting by extinguishing its fuse with his cap. For that deed, as well as his pro-uprising rhetoric, Kościuszko promoted him to the rank of chorąży in the newly created regiment of Cracow's Grenadiers (Grenadierzy Krakowscy). He was released from serfdom, and received the right to his land, but was probably not ennobled. His surname was changed from the peasant Bartosz to Głowacki (his mother's maiden name), although it is not certain whether it was his own choice, or whether the name was bestowed upon him by Kościuszko himself.

On 6 June 1794 Głowacki took part in the Battle of Szczekociny. Polish forces, 15,000 strong, were defeated by a combined Prussian and Russian army, some 27,000 strong. Głowacki was among the 346 Polish wounded evacuated from battle, but his wounds were too serious, and he died soon afterwards (sometime between 6 and 9 June). He was probably buried in the Kielce Cathedral on 9 June.

== Fame ==
Bartosz Głowacki became one of the most famous Polish soldiers of the uprising and joined the ranks of the Polish national heroes. The knowledge of his deeds was spread by those who wanted to show that the Polish–Lithuanian Commonwealth was defended not only by its most privileged class — the nobility (szlachta), but also by the least privileged, the peasants. His story was useful to Polish patriots during the times of partitions of Poland, and was also picked up and further used as propaganda by the communist People's Republic of Poland, for whom a peasant hero was a valuable tool.
