= They Feed and Defend =

Polish patriotic slogan

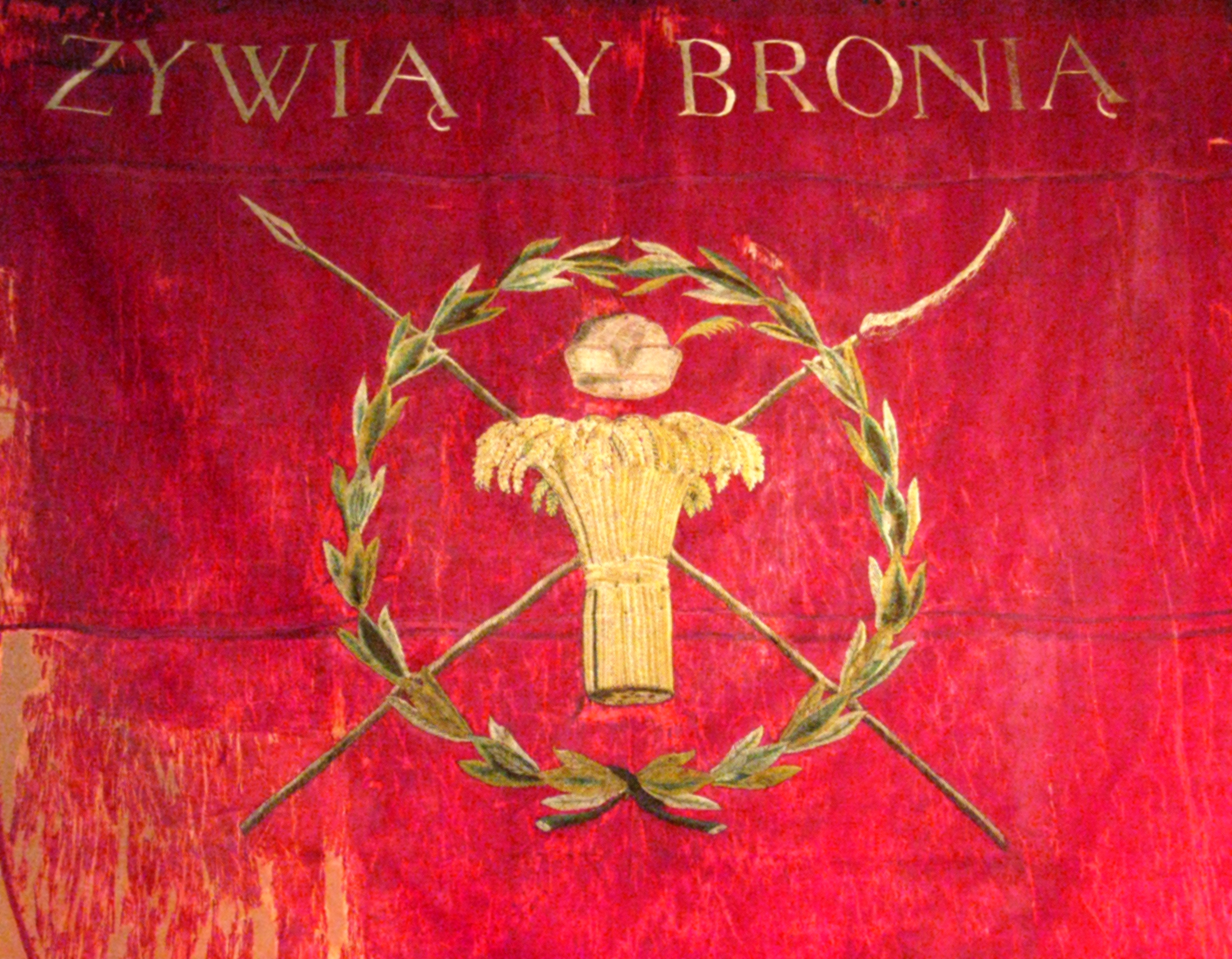
The 1794 standard of the 2nd Kraków Grenadier Regiment, which includes the motto They Feed and Defend.

They Feed and Defend (Note: Polish: Żywią i Bronią, archaic spelling: Żywią y Bronią) is a motto originally used by the scythemen regiments of the insurgent forces during the Kościuszko Uprising in 1794 in the Polish–Lithuanian Commonwealth. Since then, it became a Polish patriotic motto and the symbol of the Polish peasant movement. The motto refers to the peasants who historically during peace would work on farms making food for the society, and would fight in the defensive wars.

== History ==
In 1794, the motto They Feed and Defend (Polish: Żywią i Bronią, archaic spelling: Żywią y Bronią) was used by the scythemen regiments of the insurgent forces during the Kościuszko Uprising. Notably, it was used on the military standard of the 2nd Kraków Grenadier Regiment. The banner was awarded to the regiment by the uprising leader, Tadeusz Kościuszko, on 16 August 1794. The standard was a red rectangle, depicting a yellow (golden) sheaf and a hat with a feather placed over it, both inscribed in a wreath consisting of crossed conventionalized branches of the olive tree. On the top of the banner was written the motto, made out of the capital yellow (golden) letters, spelled as "ŻYWIĄ Y BRONIĄ". The motto referred to the peasants who historically during peace would work on farms making food for society, and would fight in the defensive wars.

In the 19th century, became a patriotic motto associated with the Polish patriotic motto. The motto refers to the peasants who historically during peace would work on farms making food for the society, and would fight in the defensive wars. It was used on rebel banners, patriotic postcards, and in art. It also began being used as the symbol Polish peasant movement, as a way to combine patriotic, and pro-independence sentiments, and to highlight the role of peasants in the society.

During World War II, the motto was used as the name of Żywią i bronią underground magazine, published by the Peasants' Battalions, which was part of the Polish resistance movement.

The motto, as part of the banner of the 2nd Kraków Grenadier Regiment, was depicted on the reverse of the 500 Polish złoty banknote emitted by the National Bank of Poland in the years 1974, 1976, 1979, and 1982.
