= Rzędowice, Opole Voivodeship =

Rzędowice
- Village
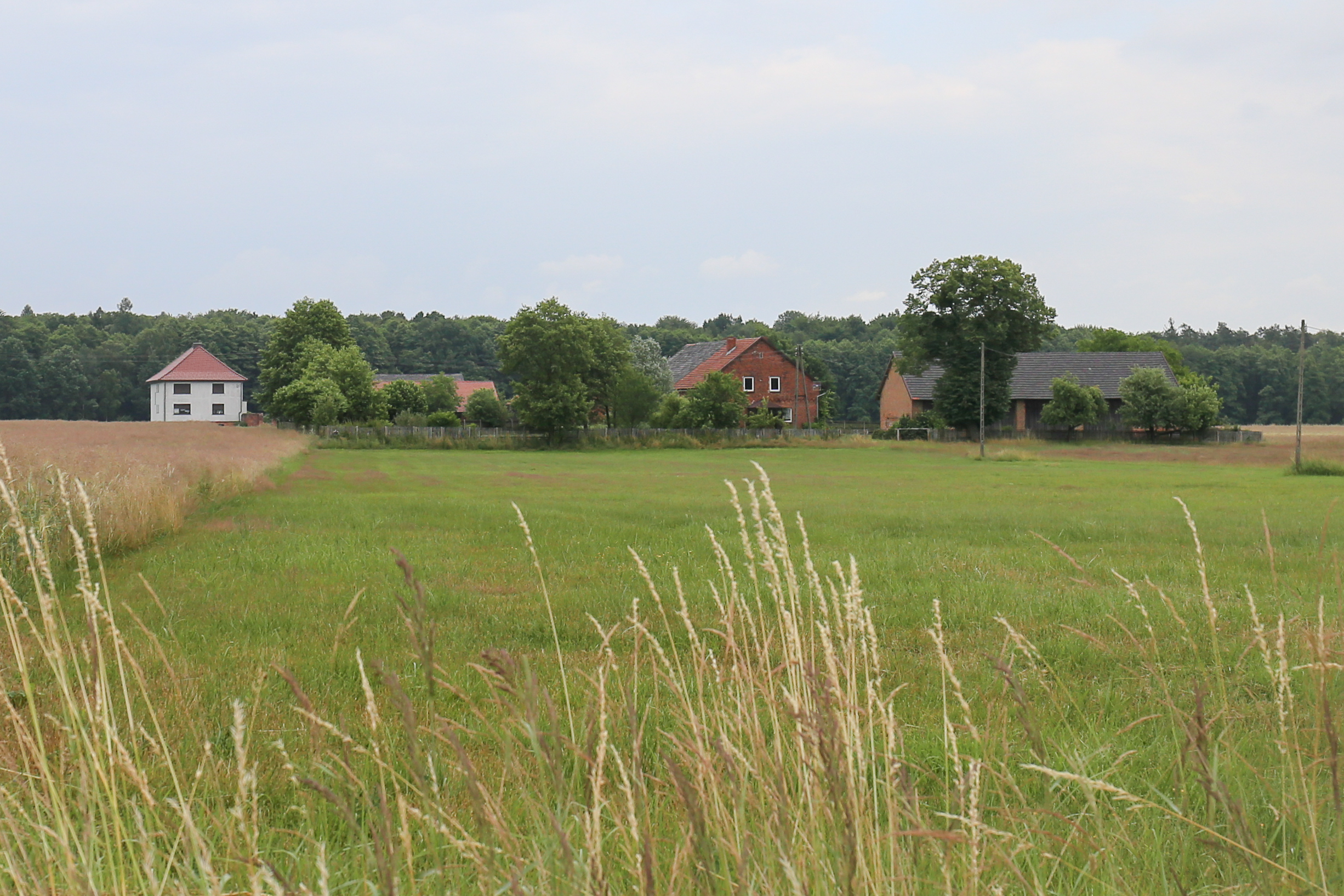

- Location within Poland
- Coordinates: 50°45′14″N 18°27′12″E
- Country: Poland
- Voivodeship: Opole
- County: Olesno
- Gmina: Dobrodzień

Rzędowice [ʐɛndɔˈvit͡sɛ] is a village in the administrative district of Gmina Dobrodzień, within Olesno County, Opole Voivodeship, in south-western Poland.
