= Revers =

Part of garment

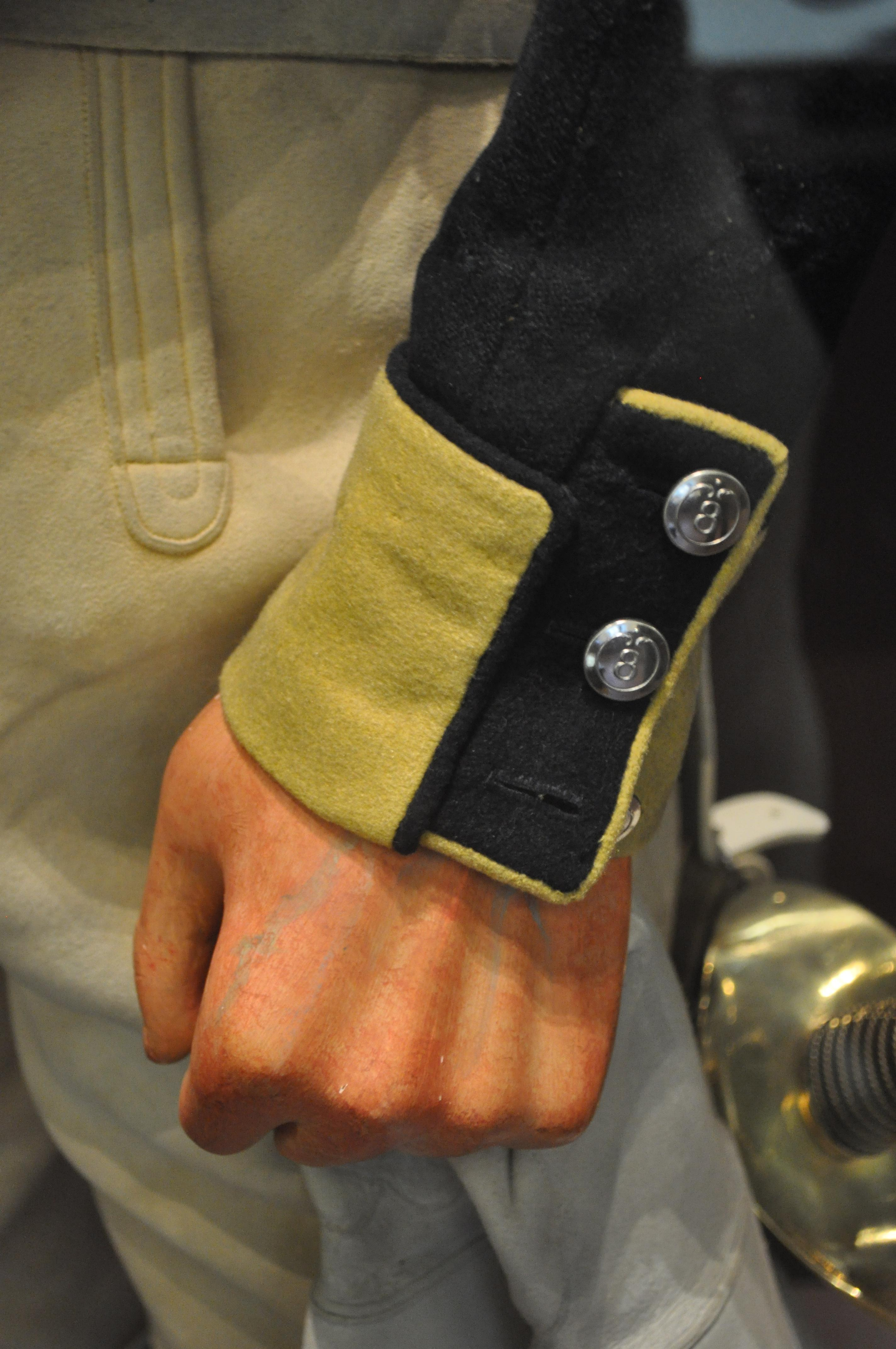
Aufschlag and revers of the uniform of 8th cuirassier regiment of the French army, 1814-1815.

A revers or rever is a part of a garment that is reversed to display the lining or facing outside. The word is borrowed from French revers, which is reflected in the s being silent.

The most common form of revers is the lapel. The revers emerged in the 1860s in France as soldiers began unbuttoning the fronts of their uniforms. When the revers became dirty, the uniform could be buttoned up to show a clean front again.
