= Walery Eljasz-Radzikowski =

Polish painter (1841–1905)

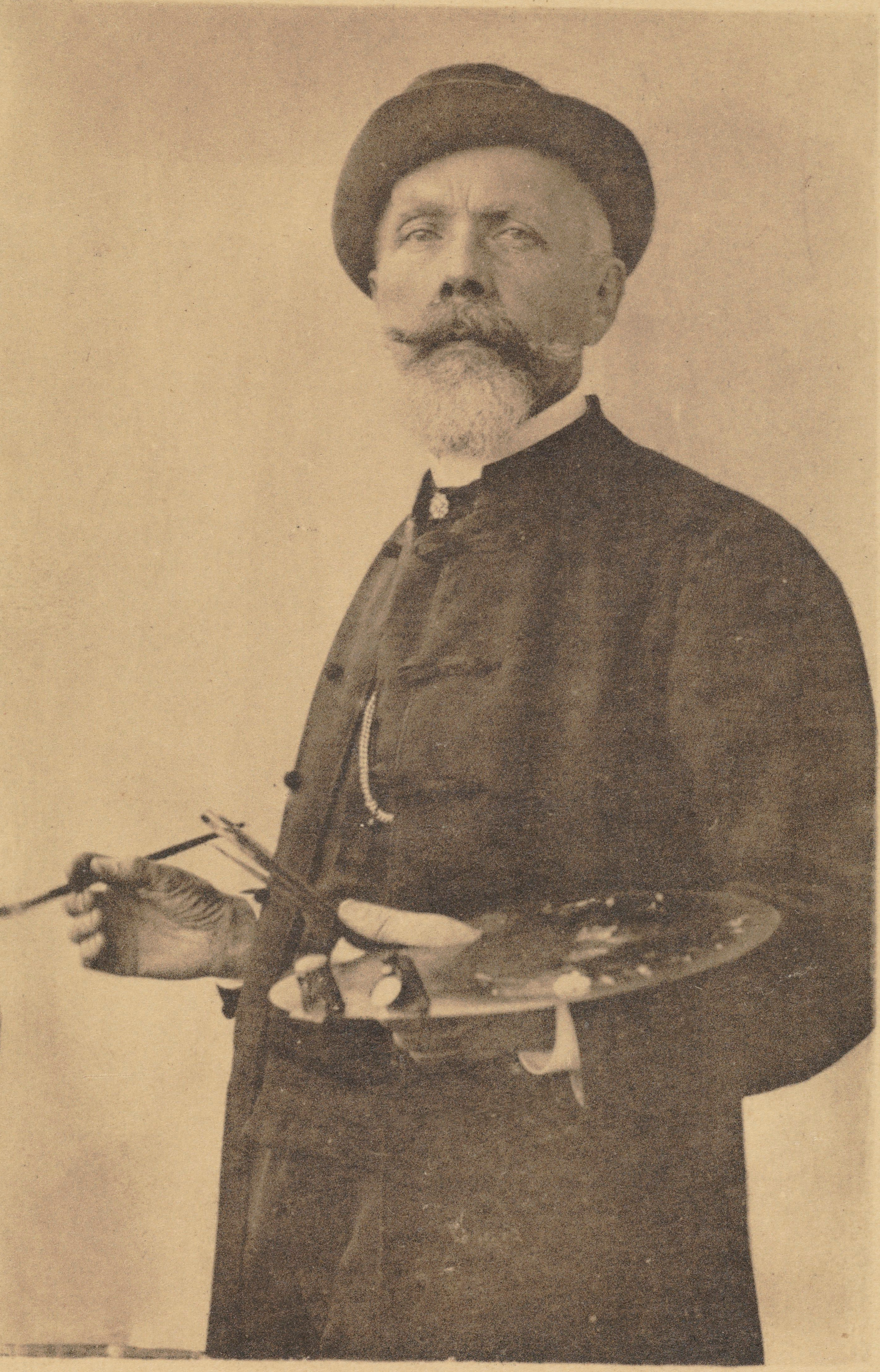
- Walery Eljasz
- Born: 13 September 1841; Kraków, Free City of Kraków
- Died: 23 March 1905 (aged 63); Kraków, Kingdom of Galicia and Lodomeria, Austria-Hungary
- Education: Kraków School of Fine Arts
- Known for: Painting, art history
- Notable work: Ilustrowany przewodnik do Tatr, Pienin i Szczawnic
- Movement: Realism

Walery Eljasz-Radzikowski (13 September 1841 – 23 March 1905) was a Polish painter, illustrator, teacher of fine arts and photographer active during the foreign Partitions of Poland.

== Career ==
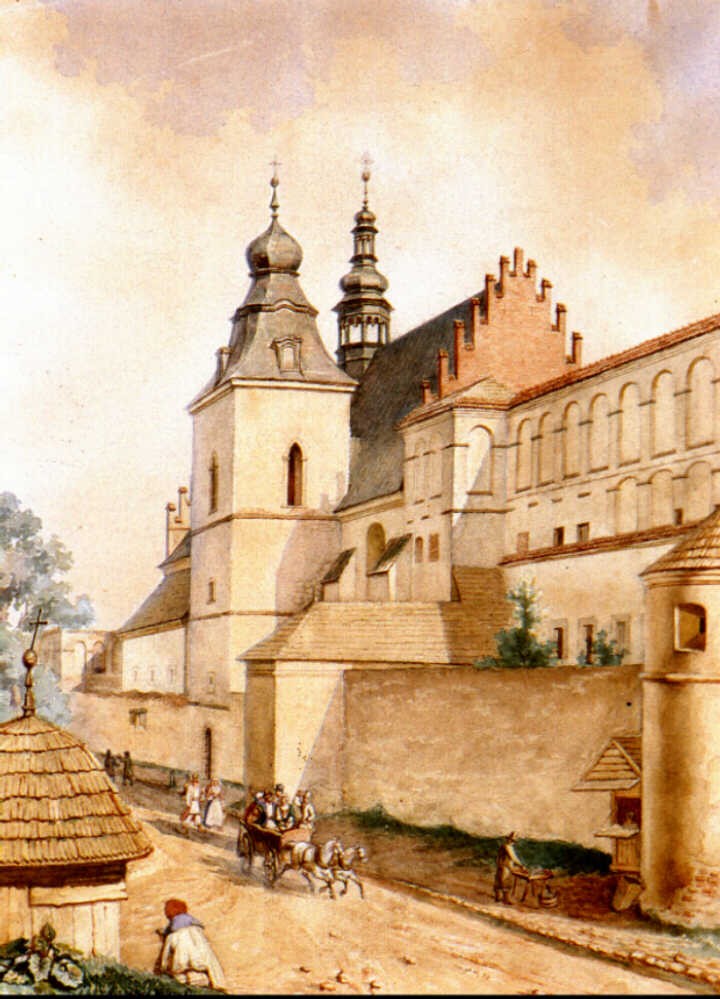
Przed Kościołem Norbertanek

Walery Eljasz (second name Radzikowski adopted later in life) studied painting in 1856-62 at the School of Fine Arts in Kraków (known today as the Jan Matejko Academy of Fine Arts) mainly at the atelier of famous Władysław Łuszczkiewicz. He continued his studies in Munich for three years in 1862-65 before his return in 1866. While in Munich, after convalescing from typhoid fever, Eljasz worked on behalf of the Polish insurrectionist Rząd Narodowy helping volunteers heading back to Poland for the January Uprising against the foreign yoke. After his return to Kraków, Eljasz served as a teacher of fine arts at local schools including at the Gimnazjum of St. Anne in 1872-91.

Eljasz painted church frescos (Chochołów, 1871), illustrated books and magazines, designed historical costumes for theatre stage productions, and exhibited his works internationally including in Kraków, Warsaw, Lwów and in Vienna. His second monograph about the Tatra Mountains called Szkice z podróży w Tatry illustrated with lithographs was published in 1874.

Eljasz-Radzikowski, an avid outdoorsman and mountain climber, was a co-founder of one of the oldest tourist societies in Europe, the cultural Polish Tatra Society in 1873. He wrote the first-ever tourist guide to Tatra Mountains in 1870 called the Ilustrowany przewodnik do Tatr, Pienin i Szczawnic (reprinted in 1886, 1891, 1896, 1900) which he himself illustrated with lithographs and woodcuts initially, and eventually with his photographs also. In 1901 he published Kraków dawny i dzisiejszy, a detailed guidebook to the historic monuments of Kraków.

== Historical paintings ==
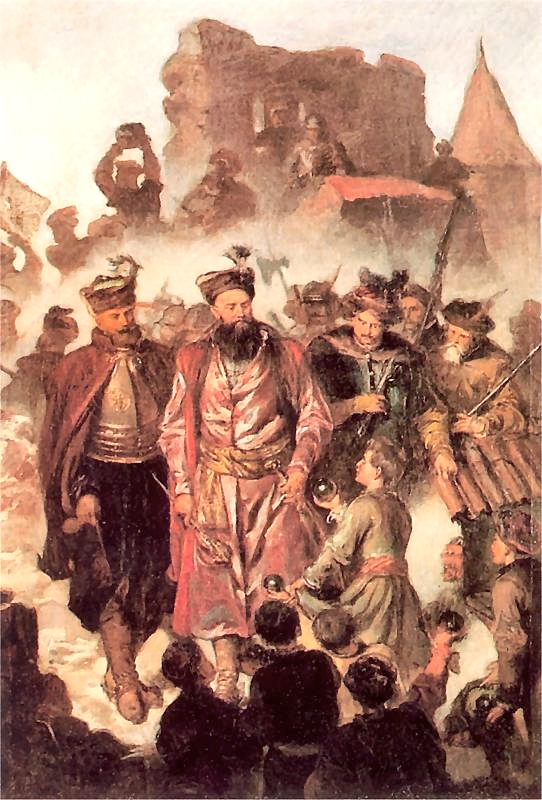
Stefan Czarniecki
Defending Kraków

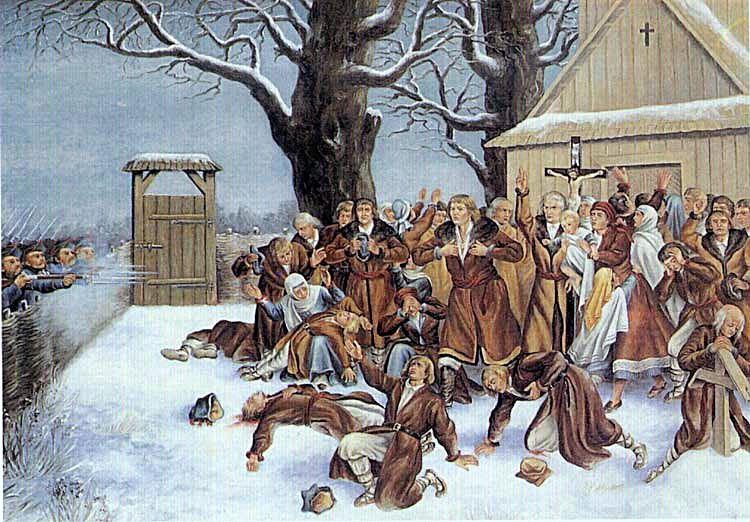
The Pratulin Martyrs

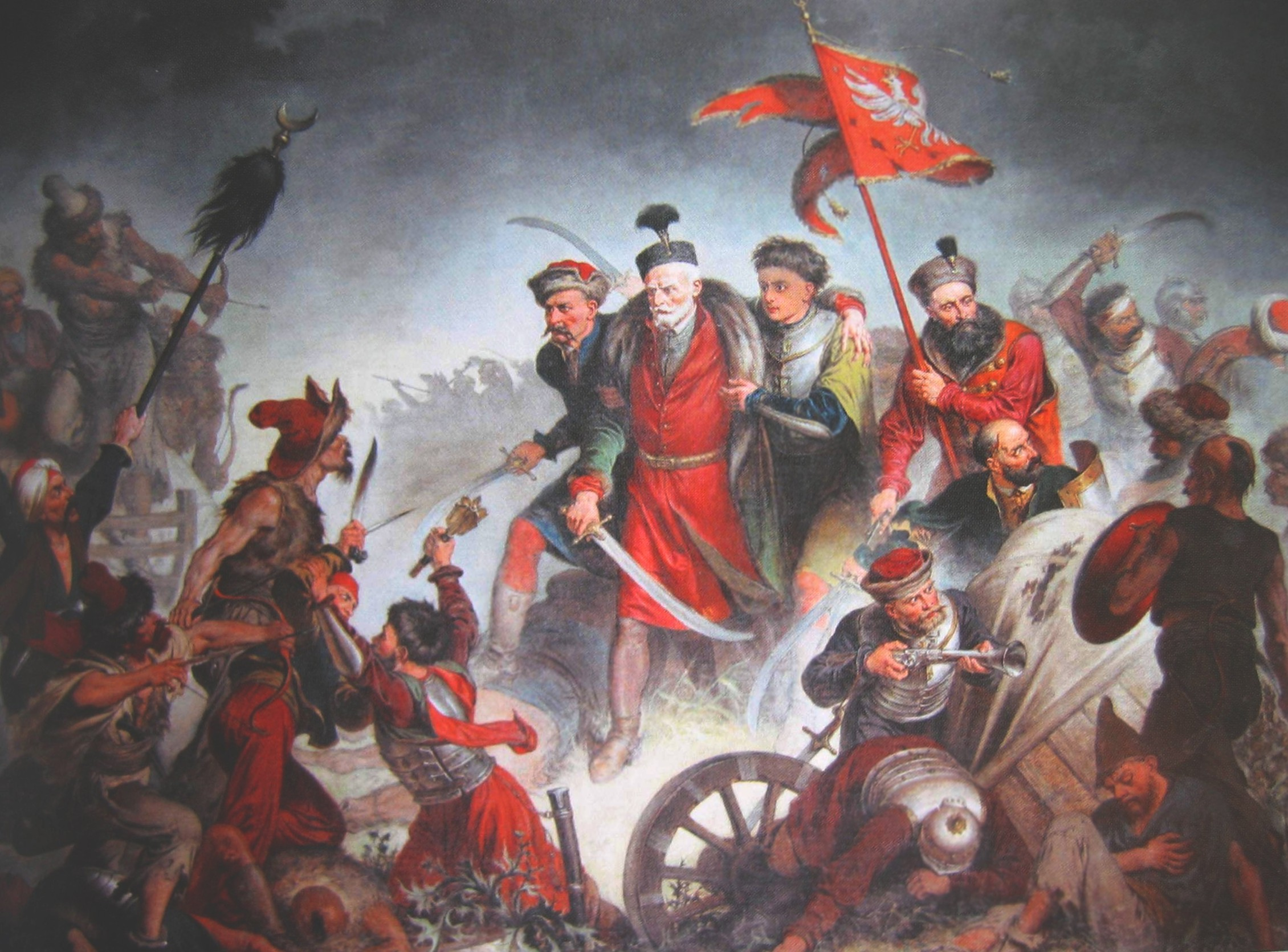
The death of
Stanisław Żółkiewski
at the Battle of Cecora

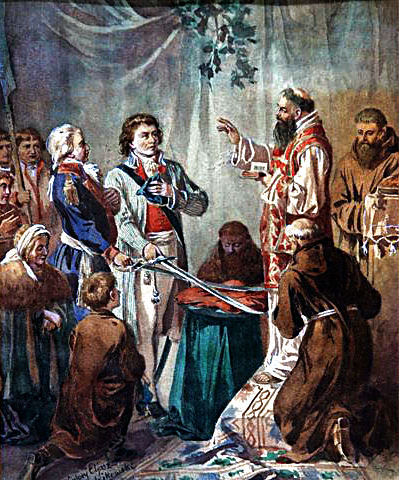
Consecrating the sabers of Tadeusz Kościuszko and Józef Wodzicki
