= Czechczery =

Polish military trousers

Czechczery, or czekczery, were long trousers used by various Polish military formations in 18th and 19th century since the Great Sejm.

== Variations ==
Czechczery worn by soldiers of Polish-Lithuanian Commonwealth and Army of the Duchy of Warsaw were long, loose trousers while those worn by soldiers of the Army of Congress Poland were tight, tucked in boots, and fastened to the half of the calf.
