= Scythemen =

Soldiers armed with scythes

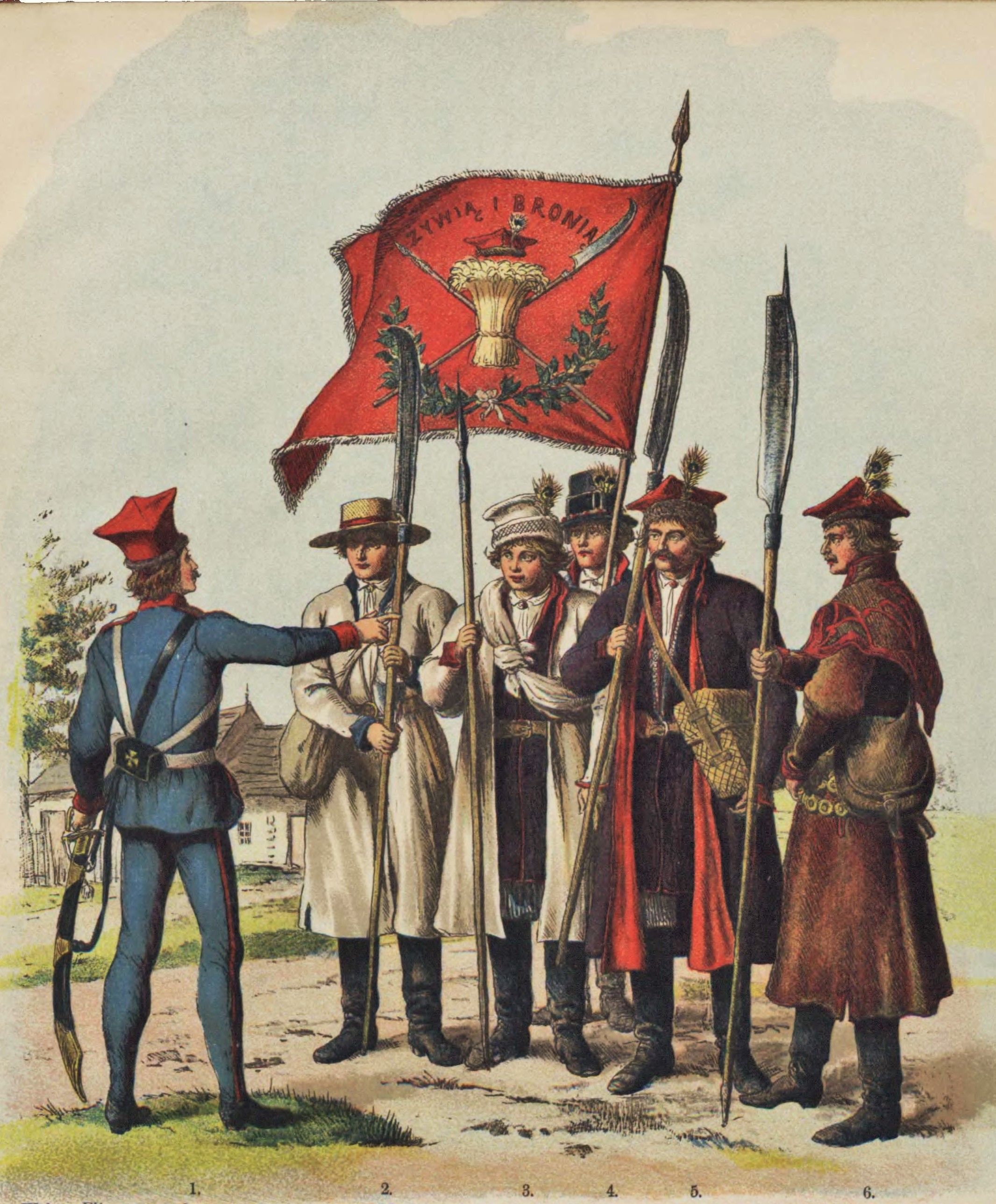
Scythemen of the 2nd Kraków Grenadier Regiment in 1794.

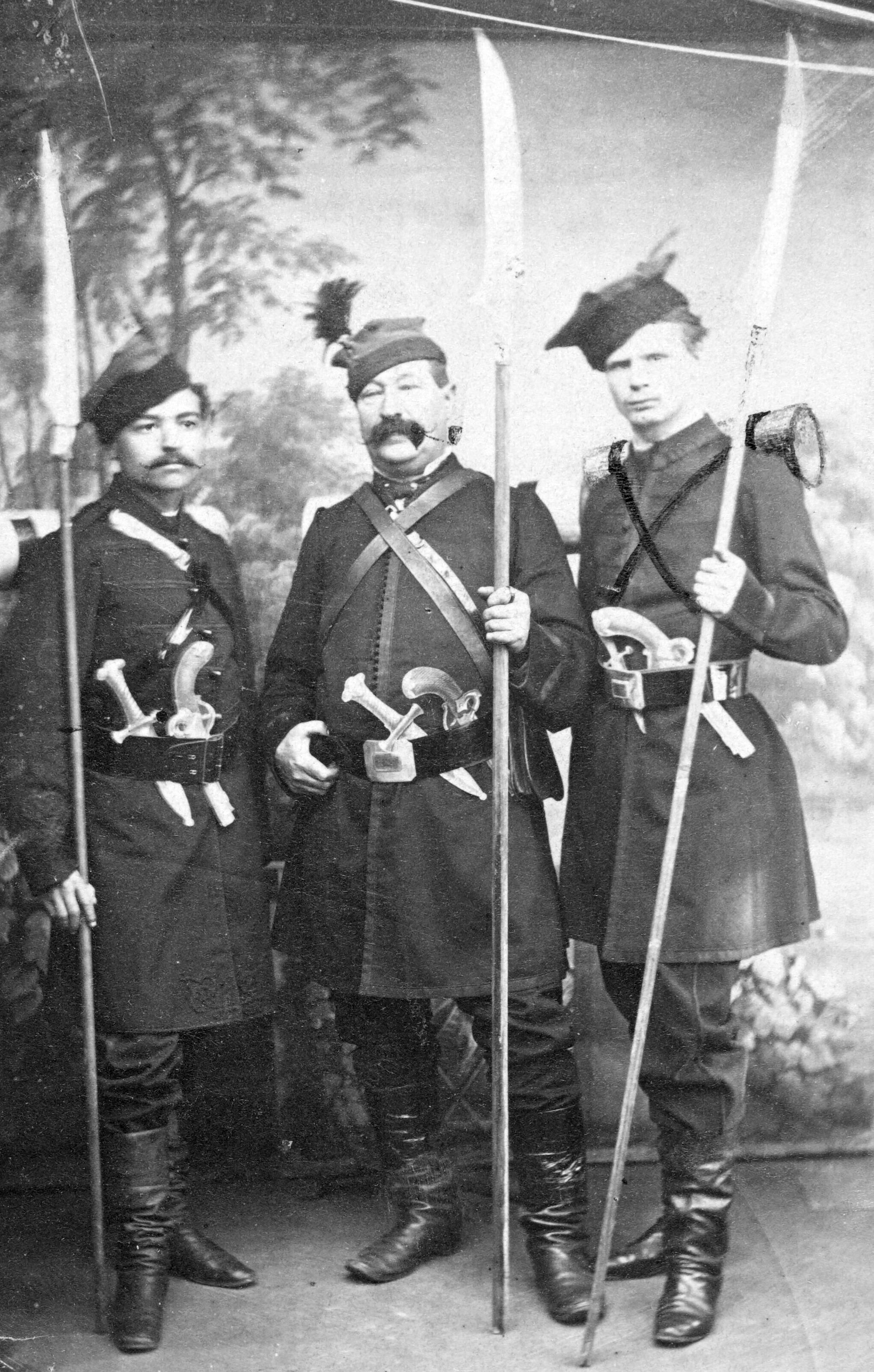
Polish scythemen of the January Uprising in 1863–1864.

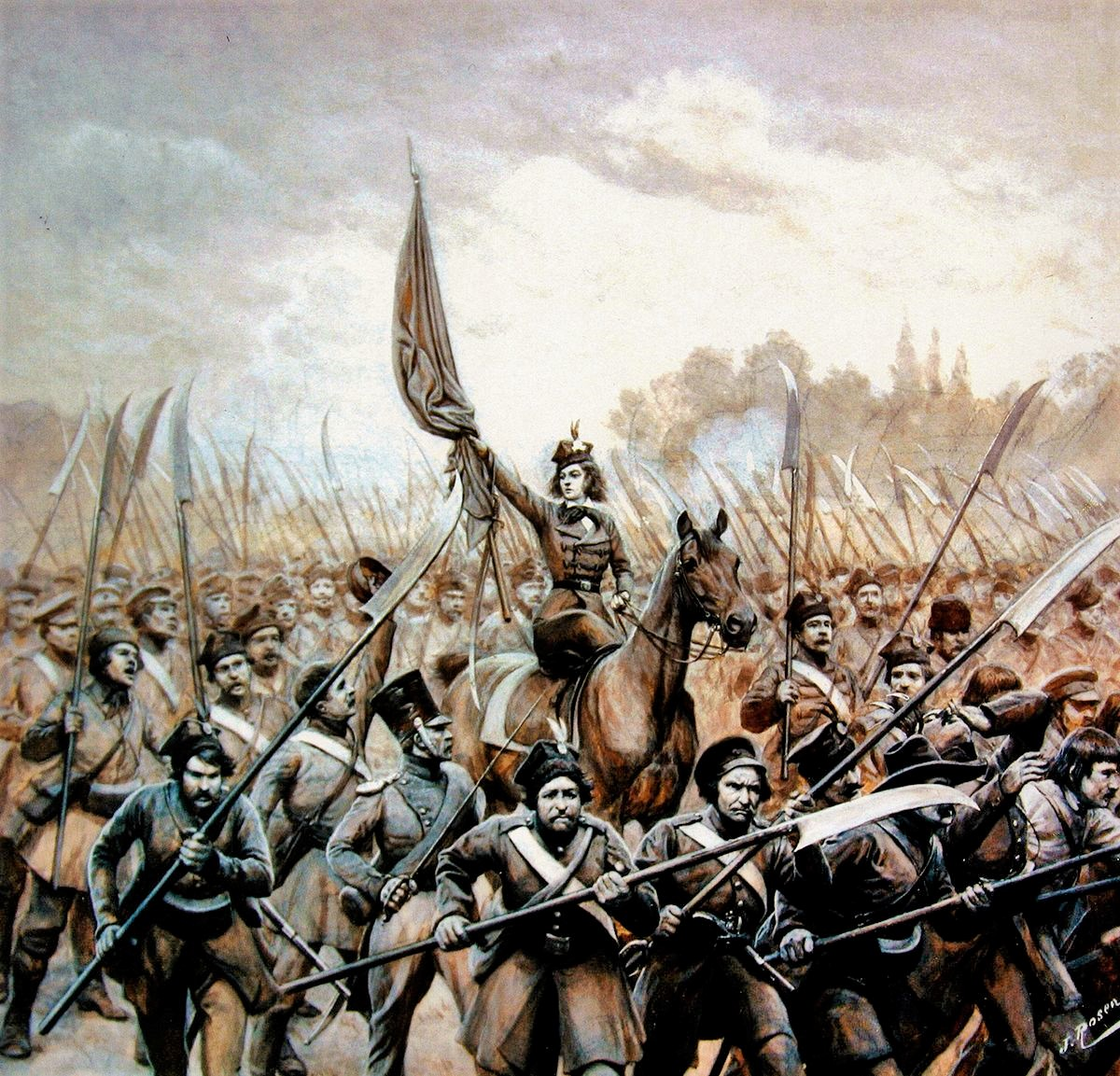
Scythemen in 1831, led by Emilia Plater. Gouache by Jan Rosen.

Scythemen, also known as scythe-bearers (Note: Polish: kosynier (sing.), kosynierzy (pl.); Lithuanian: dalgininkas) is the term for soldiers (often peasants and townspeople) armed with war scythes. First appearing in the Kościuszko Uprising of 1794, scythemen quickly became one of the symbols of the struggle for Polish independence and for the emancipation of the serfs.

== History ==
In Poland the scythemen formations are best remembered for their decisive role in the Battle of Racławice during the Kościuszko Uprising. Through this battle, well known in Poland, and because of Kościuszko's influence and pro-peasant stance, the kosynierzy became one of the symbols of the fight for Polish independence, as well as a symbol of self-identification of the peasantry with the Polish nation. The kosynier Wojciech Bartosz Głowacki, recognized for his bravery in the battle of Racławice, became one of the most famous Polish peasants, a symbol in his own right, attracting what some described as a cult following.

The tradition of the scythemen would be commemorated through peasant-staged battle reenactments, statues, poems, and plays.

During the Kościuszko Uprising, most of the peasants who joined the scythemen units came from Lesser Poland surrounding Kraków, inspired by Kościuszko's Połaniec Proclamation. They were dressed in the regional peasant garb, mainly composed of a white sukmana and a red rogatywka, which became associated with the kosynierzy.

Despite popular imagination, the kosynierzy were only a support formation in Kościuszko's forces during the uprising, as they formed a majority only in one infantry regiment.

Scythemen units also fought in the November Uprising of 1830–31, the Kraków uprising of 1846, the January Uprising of 1863–64, the Silesian Uprising of 1919 and possibly as late as during the German invasion of Poland of 1939. Though less remembered, the scythemen's participation in the November and January Uprisings were likely more significant than during the Kościuszko Uprising.

== Bibliography ==
- Hann, C. M.; Magocsi, Paul R. (2005). Galicia: A Multicultured Land. University of Toronto Press. ISBN 978-0-8020-3781-7.
- Jakubowska, Longina (2012). Patrons of History: Nobility, Capital and Political Transitions in Poland. Ashgate Publishing, Ltd. ISBN 978-1-4094-5663-6.
- Jasas, Rimantas (2021). "dalgininkai". Vle.lt.
- Kwaśniewicz, Włodzimierz (1981). 1000 słów o broni białej i uzbrojeniu ochronnym. Warsaw: MON. ISBN 8311076669.
- Lerski, Halina (1996). Historical Dictionary of Poland, 966–1945. ABC-CLIO. ISBN 978-0-313-03456-5.
- Maciejewski, Marian (1991). Broń strzelecka wojsk polskich w latach 1717–1945. Szczecin: Wydawnictwo Glob. ISBN 8370070663.
- PWN Encyklopedia (2014). "kosynier". Archived from the original on 7 April 2014.
- Storozynski, Alex (2009). The Peasant Prince: and the Age of Revolution. St. Martin's Press. pp. 196–197. ISBN 978-0-312-62594-8.
- Żygulski, Zdzisław; Wielecki, Henryk (1988). Polski mundur wojskowy. Kraków: KAW. ISBN 8303014838.
