= War scythe =

Type of polearm with a curved single-edged blade

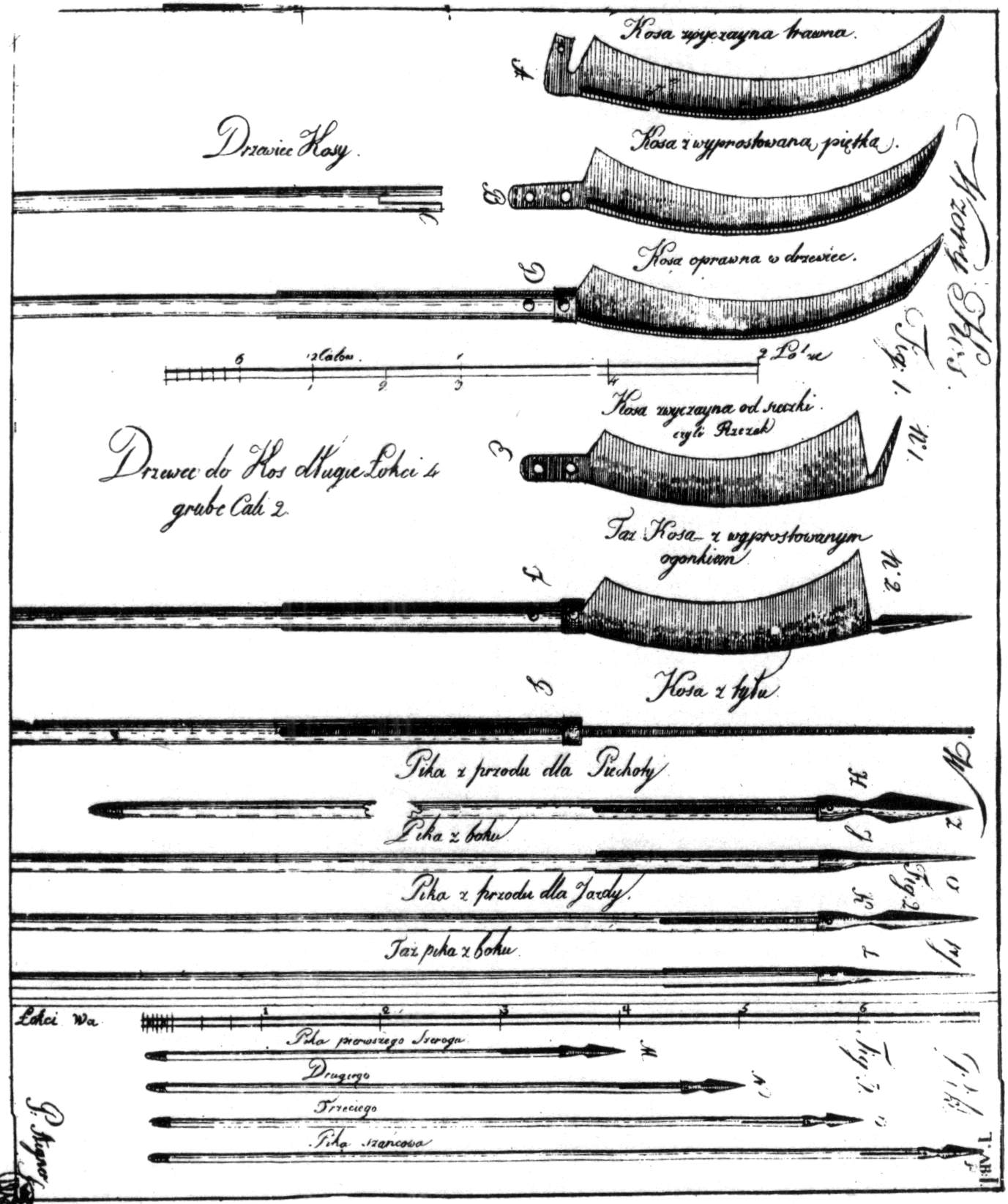
Illustration from Chrystian Piotr Aigner's "Krótka nauka o kosach i pikach" ("A Brief Treatise on Scythes and Pikes"), 1794

A war scythe or military scythe is a form of polearm with a curving single-edged blade with the cutting edge on the concave side of the blade. Its blade bears a superficial resemblance to that of an agricultural scythe from which it is likely to have evolved, but the war scythe is otherwise unrelated to agricultural tools and is a purpose-built infantry melee weapon. The blade of a war scythe has regularly proportioned flats, a thickness comparable to that of a spear or sword blade, and slightly curves along its edge as it tapers to its point. This is different from farming scythes, which have very thin and irregularly curved blades, specialised for mowing grass and wheat only, unsuitable as blades for improvised spears or polearms.

Compared to a fauchard (which is believed to have evolved from the war scythe), the blade of the war scythe has the cutting edge on the concave side like the agricultural tool whereas the fauchard has the edge along the convex side.

As an infantry weapon, the military scythe had practical applications both in offensive actions against enemy infantry and as a defensive measure against enemy cavalry.

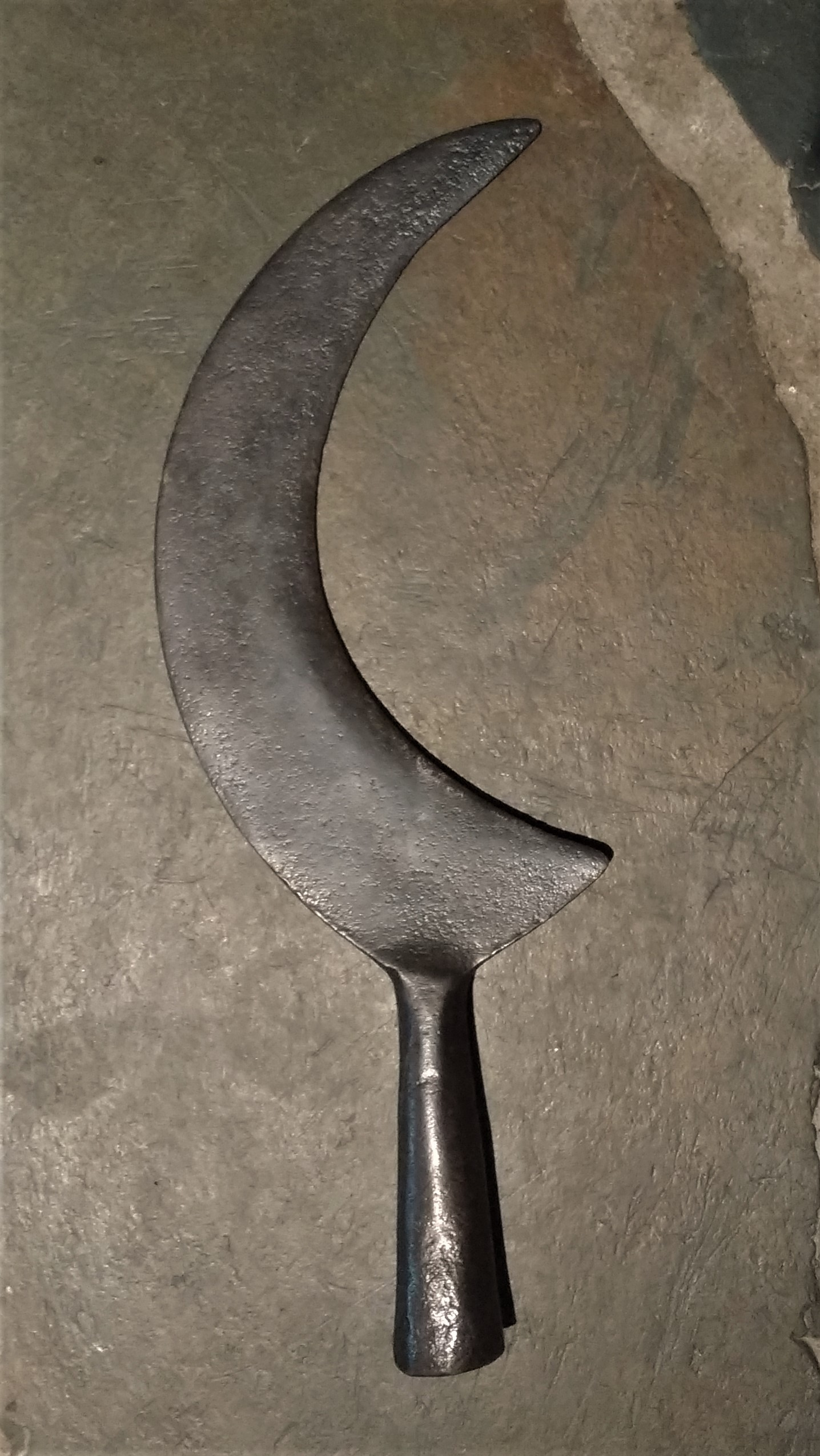
17th century Scottish war scythe

== History ==
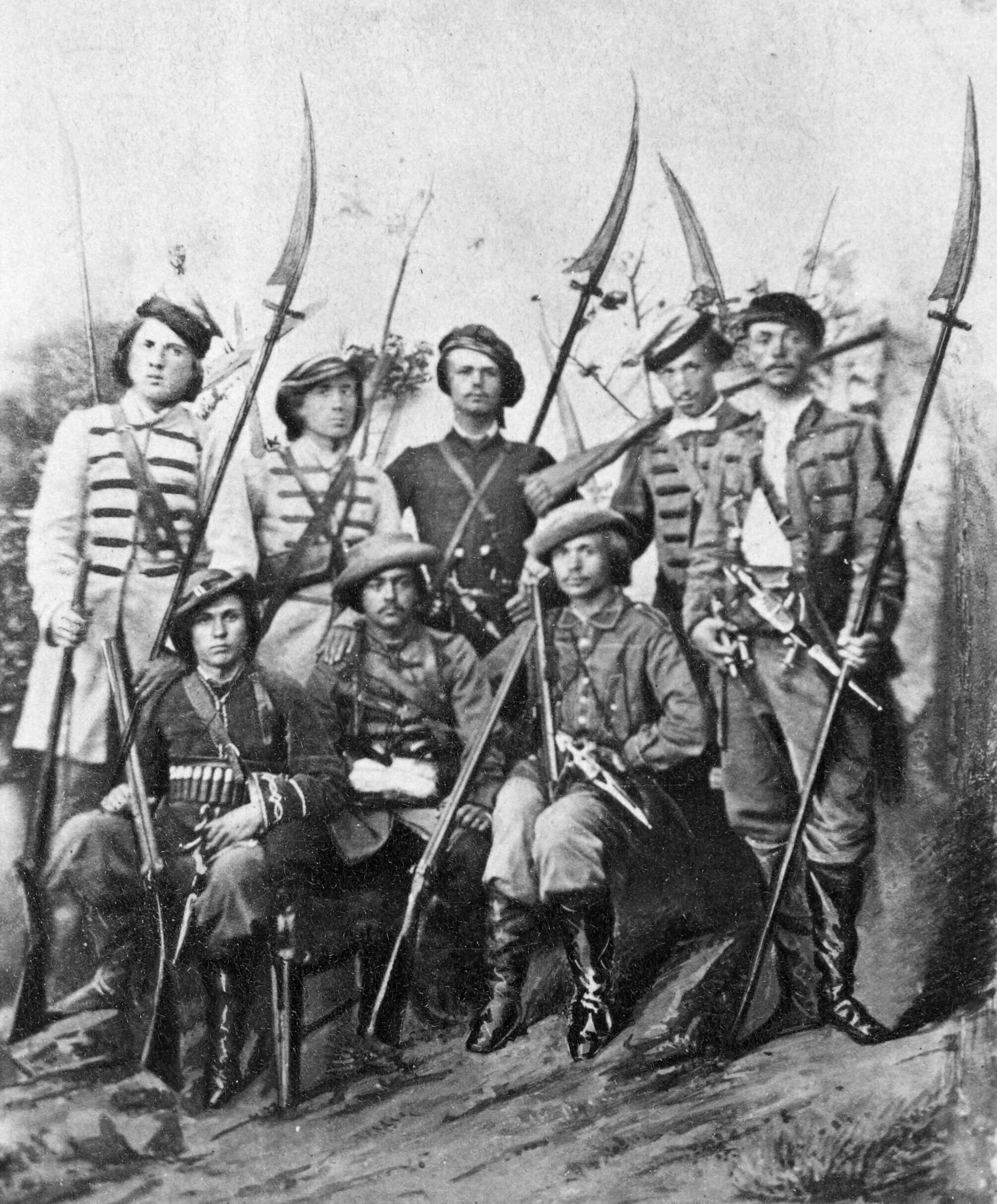
Scythemen during Poland's January 1863 Uprising

Farming tools such as the scythe and pitchfork have frequently been used as a weapon by those who could not afford or did not have access to more expensive weapons such as pikes, swords, or later, guns. Scythes and pitchforks were stereotypically carried by angry mobs or gangs of enraged peasants. The process usually involved reforging the blade of a scythe at a 90-degree angle, strengthening the joint between the blade and the shaft with an additional metal pipe or bolts and reinforcing the shaft to better protect it against cuts from enemy blades. At times, instead of a scythe blade, a blade from a hand-operated chaff cutter was used.

War scythes were a popular weapon of choice and opportunity of many peasant uprisings throughout history.

The ancient Greek historian Xenophon describes in his work (Anabasis) the chariots of Artaxerxes II, which had projecting scythes fitted, although Xenophon (and later Roman authors) comment clearly on how useless these scythed chariots were in actual battle: Xenophon specifically states that the Greeks simply got out of the way of the chariots and proceeded to attack them from behind.

Later, Jan Žižka's Hussite warriors, recruited mostly from peasantry, used modified scythes. Called originally 'kůsa -scythe' and later sudlice, it doubled as both a stabbing and cutting weapon, developing later into the "ušatá sudlice"—Bohemian earspoon, more suitable for combat—thanks to side spikes (ears), acting as end stops, it did not penetrate too deeply, and so was easier to draw from fallen foes. War scythes were widely used by Polish and Lithuanian peasants during revolts in the 18th and 19th centuries. Polish peasants used war scythes during the 17th-century Swedish invasion (The Deluge). In the 1685 battle of Sedgemoor, James Scott, 1st Duke of Monmouth, fielded a 5000 strong peasant unit armed with war scythes. They were used in the 1784 Transylvanian peasants' Revolt of Horea, Cloşca and Crişan, in the war in the Vendée by royalist peasant troops, in the 1st War of Schleswig in 1848 in Denmark, and again in various Polish uprisings: the Kościuszko Uprising in 1794 and the battle of Racławice, in which scythe wielders successfully charged and captured Russian artillery. In that year Chrystian Piotr Aigner published a field manual, Short Treatise on Pikes and Scythes, detailing the training and operation of scythe-equipped forces, the first and probably only such book in the history of warfare. War scythes were later used in the November Uprising in 1831, January Uprising in 1863, and Silesian Uprising in 1921. The description of a fighting unit as "scythemen" was used in Poland as late as 1939; however, the Gdynia "kosynierzy" were armed with hunting guns rather than scythes.

== Specifics ==
As a polearm, the war scythe is characterised by long range and powerful force (due to leverage). They could be used, depending on construction and tactics, to make slashing or stabbing attacks, and with their uncommon appearance and considerable strength could have a psychological impact on an unprepared enemy. However, like most polearms, their disadvantages were weight (which could quickly exhaust the user) and slow speed. After the German Peasants' War during 1524–1525, a fencing book edited by Paulus Hector Mair described in 1542 techniques how to fence using a scythe. However, the depictions in the manuscript clearly show two fencers using agricultural scythes, and not war scythes. Given that agricultural scythes are wholly unsuited for combat (due to their thin blade, angled blade position and awkward grip), it is very much possible that this manuscript, or the depictions of scythe-combat therein, are a form of contemporary satire (such as the often-depicted knight battling a snail).

== Gallery ==
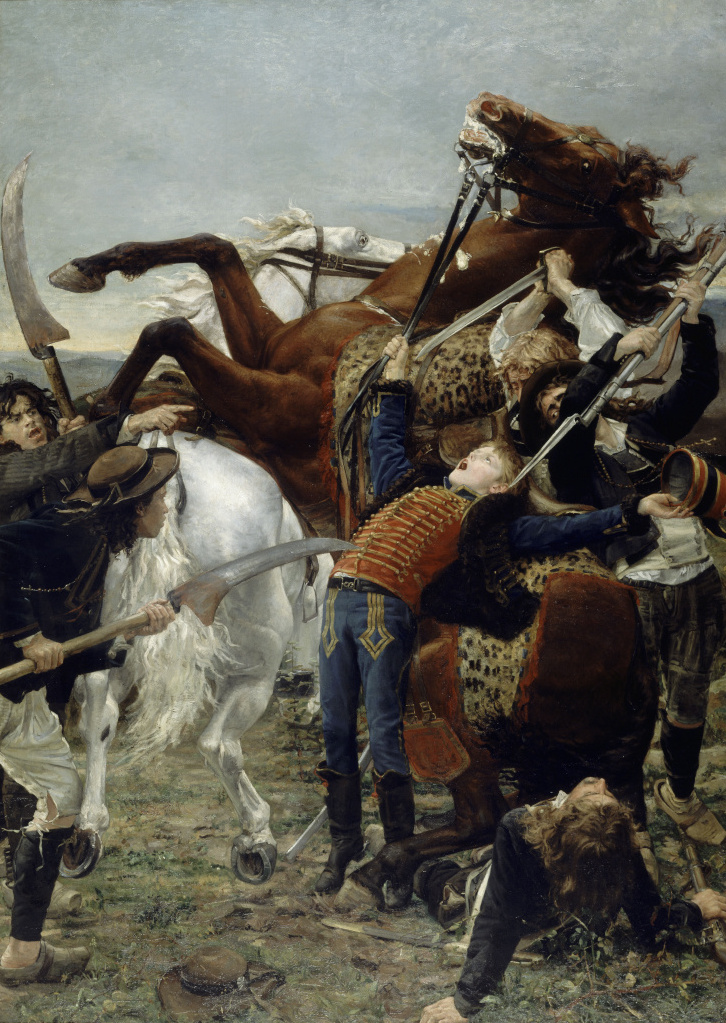
The Death of Bara (Jean-Joseph Weerts, 1883), depicting the use of the war scythe

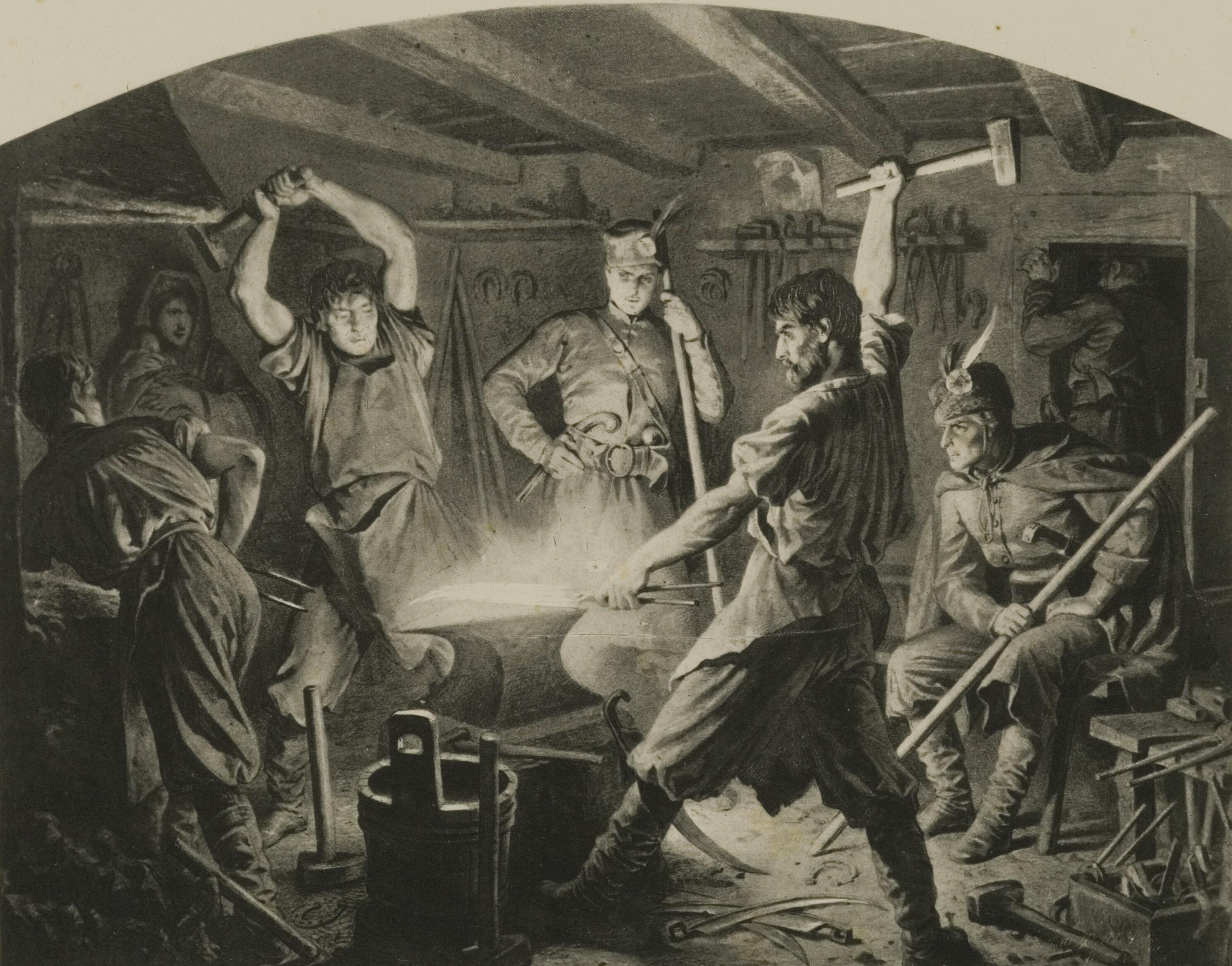
Artur Grottger, "Kucie kos" ("Forging of Scythes") during the January Uprising

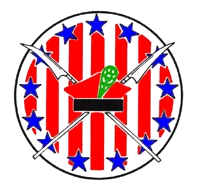
Roundel of the Polish 7th Air Escadrille, featuring crossed war scythes

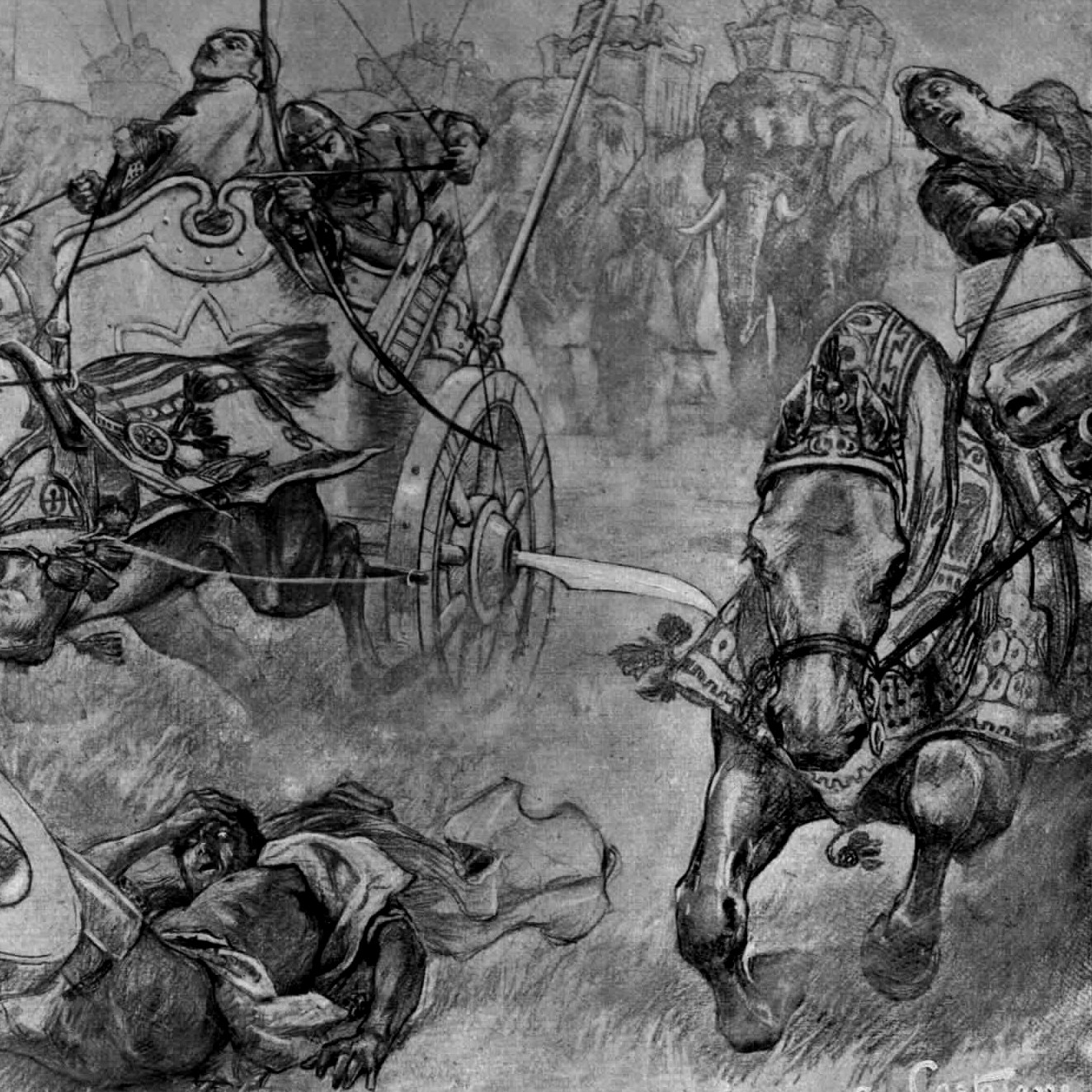
Persian scythed chariot

== See also ==
- Shotel, the traditional Ethiopian sickle sword
- Fauchard
- Kama – Japanese hand scythe, sometimes also adapted to combat
- Falx – A sword with an inward curved blade
- Rhomphaia – Larger variant of the falx, much more similar to the war scythe
- Dagger-axe
