= Battle of Racławice =

Battle of the Kościuszko Uprising

Coordinates: 50°18′38″N 20°13′44″E

- Part of the Kościuszko Uprising
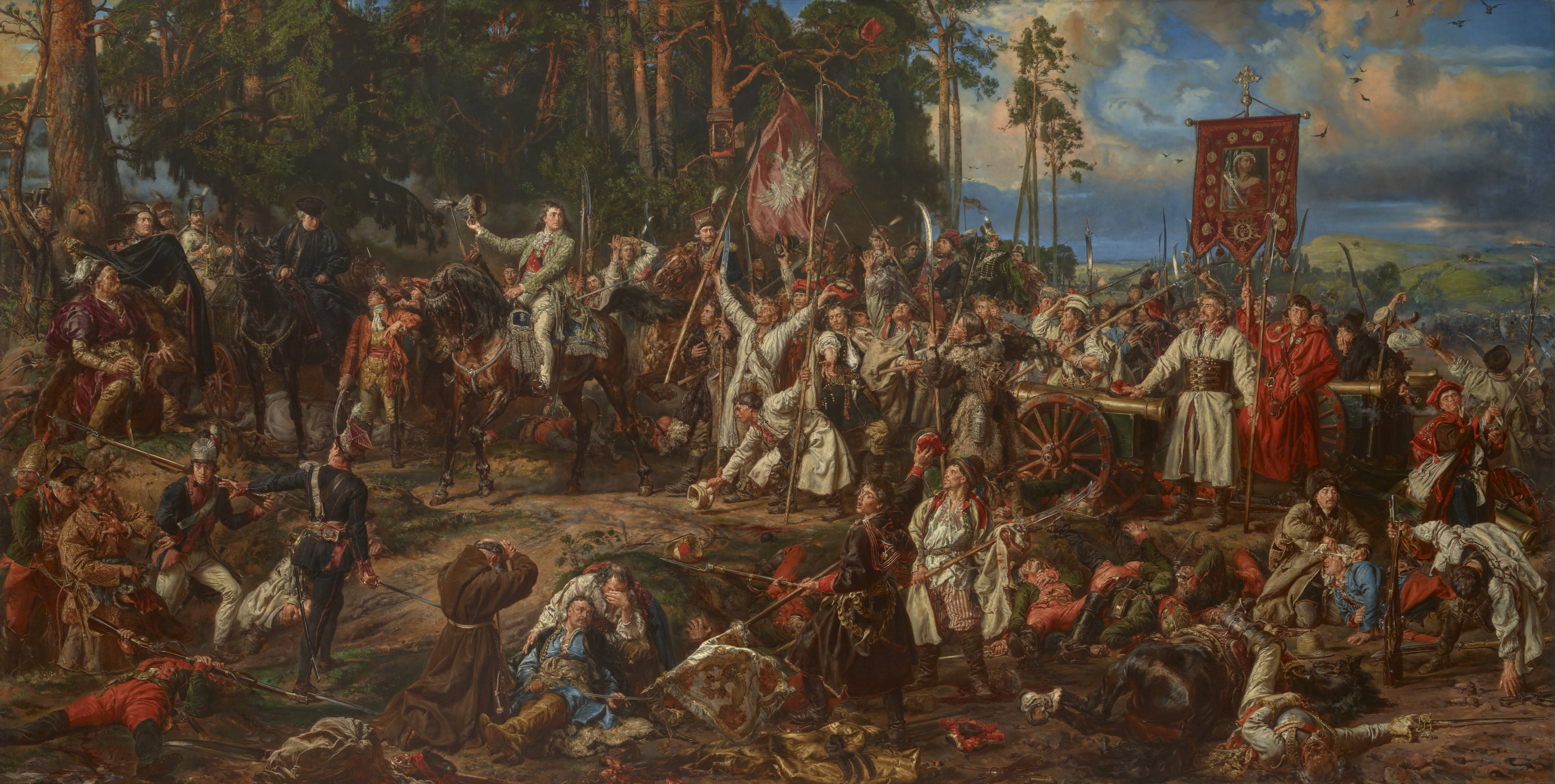
- "Battle of Racławice", Jan Matejko 465 × 897 cm. Kraków's National Museum.
Date	4 April 1794
Location	Racławice, Lesser Poland
Result	Polish victory

Belligerents
Poland-Lithuania	(Russia) Russian Empire

Commanders and leaders
Tadeusz Kościuszko; Józef Zajączek; Antoni Madaliński	(Russia) Fyodor Denisov (Russia) Alexander Tormasov

Strength
5,000; 11 guns	3,000; 12 guns

Casualties and losses
200–250	800; 12 guns captured

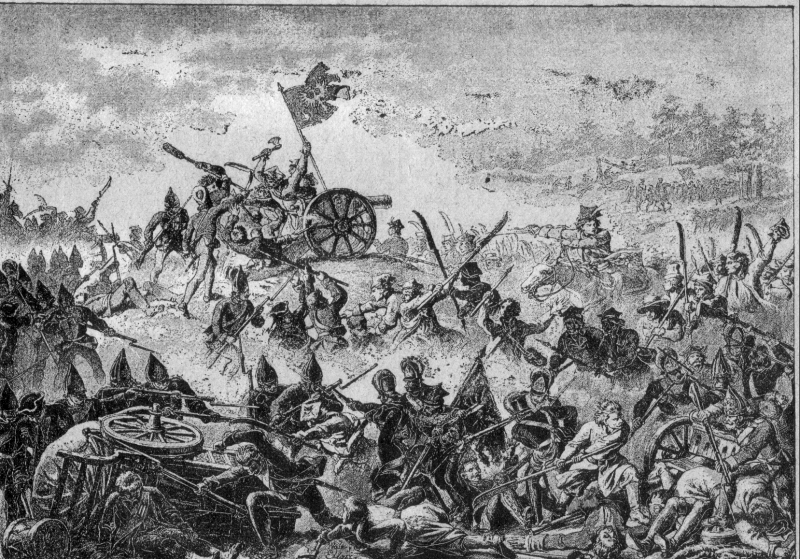
Battle of Racławice on a 19th-century sketch by Michał Stachowicz

The Battle of Racławice (Polish: Bitwa pod Racławicami) was one of the first battles of the Kościuszko Uprising against Russia. It was fought on 4 April 1794 near the village of Racławice in Lesser Poland.

The battle site is one of Poland's official national Historic Monuments (Pomnik historii), as designated on 1 May 2004. Its listing is maintained by the National Heritage Board of Poland. In the original text of Poland Is Not Yet Lost, the battle is mentioned in the last verse.

== Battle ==
General Denisov, with 2,500 troops, had planned to attack the Poles from the south, while Tormasov's force of 3,000 troops blocked Kościuszko. Encountering Tormasov's force first, Kościuszko occupied a nearby hill, General Antoni Madalinski on his right and General Józef Zajączek on his left. Not waiting any longer, Tormasov attacked the hill by 15:00, setting up their cannon. Kosciuszko inspired his peasant brigade with shouts of "My boys, take that artillery! For God, and the Fatherland! Go forward with faith!"

The first group of serfs captured 3 twelve-pound cannons and the second wave captured eight more cannons. Moving to his left flank, Kosciuszko led a bayonet charge when the Russians fled, followed closely by the scythemen.

The Polish Order of Battle was as follows:

unit	superior	soldiers
2 battalions	Infantry Regiment of Czapski	400 bayonets
2 battalions	Infantry Regiment of Wodzicki	400 bayonets
2 battalions	Infantry Regiment of Ożarowski	400 bayonets
1 battalion	Infantry Regiment of Raczyński	200 bayonets
10 squadrons of cavalry	under Antoni Madaliński	400 sabres
10 squadrons of cavalry	under Magnet	400 sabres
4 cavalry squadrons	under Biernacki	160 sabres
2 auxiliary cavalry squadrons	Duchy of Württemberg	80 sabres
2440 men altogether

In addition, Lesser Poland fielded approximately 2,000 peasants armed with war scythes and pikes, known as kosynierzy, as well as 11 cannons. The outcome of the battle was a tactical Polish victory, with Kościuszko defeating the numerically inferior enemy. However, his forces were too small to undertake a successful pursuit, and the Corps of General Denisov evaded destruction and continued to operate in Lesser Poland.

== Aftermath ==
Kościuszko marched back to Kraków and made camp in the fields of Bosutow. After the battle, Kościuszko paraded before his troops in a sukmana, a traditional attire worn in Lesser Poland, in honour of the bravery of the peasants, whose charge ensured the quick capture of the Russian artillery. He also praised Wojciech Bartosz Głowacki, a peasant who was the first to reach the cannons (he is visible in Matejko's painting, above). He smothered its fuse with his hat before it fired. In return he received an award of nobility, his freedom, a tract of land and made standard-bearer.

The victory was subsequently promoted in Poland as a major success and helped in spreading the Kościuszko Uprising to other areas of Poland and instigating the Warsaw Uprising of 1794. Also, the participation of peasant volunteers was seen by many as the starting point of the Polish peasantry's political evolution from serfs to equally entitled citizens of the nation.

== Legacy ==
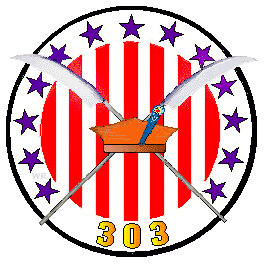
Emblem of the 303rd Squadron

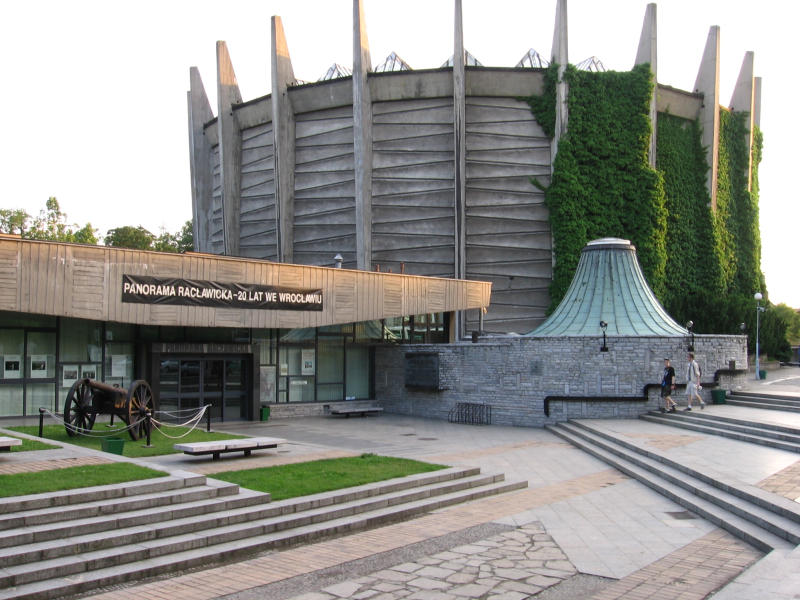
Racławice Panorama in Wrocław

=== Military ===
The red cap worn by Kościuszko's soldiers and the homemade war scythes were later featured on the emblem of the RAF's 303 (Polish) Fighter Squadron, which took part in the Battle of Britain.

The Battle of Racławice is commemorated on the Tomb of the Unknown Soldier, Warsaw, with the inscription "RACŁAWICE 4 IV 1794".

=== Art ===
Jan Matejko's painting, Kościuszko at Racławice, depicts the battle and is on display at the Sukiennice Museum, a branch of the National Museum in Kraków. A monumental panorama (measuring 15 x 114 meters) known as the Racławice Panorama was completed a century after the battle in 1894, and is currently on display in Wrocław as a branch of the National Museum in Wrocław.

== See also ==
- The Racławice Panorama
