= Józef Sylwester Sosnowski =

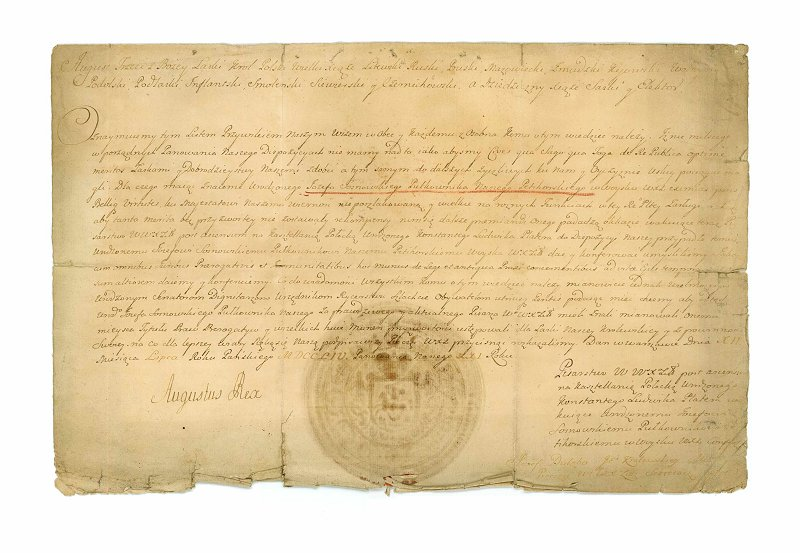
The nomination for the office of the Grand Notary of Lithuania. Written by King Augustus III of Poland, stamped by Chancellor Józef Dułęba, July 12, 1754

Józef Sylwester Sosnowski (died 31 December 1783), of the Nałęcz coat-of-arms, was a Polish-Lithuanian magnate — Voivode of Smolensk (from 1771) and Połock (from 1781), Grand Notary of Lithuania (1754), Field Notary of Lithuania (1764–71), Field Hetman of Lithuania (1775–80), a delegate to the Convocation Sejm of 1764, and Marshall of the Electoral Sejm of 1764.

Sosnowski is best remembered as the father of a love interest of Tadeusz Kościuszko's, Ludwika Sosnowska. Sosnowski refused him his daughter's hand, reputedly telling the future hero of the American Revolution and leader of Poland's Kosciuszko Uprising against Russia that "turtledoves are not for common sparrows, and magnates' daughters are not for petty nobility."
