= Wills of Tadeusz Kościuszko =

Tadeusz Kościuszko (1746–1817), a prominent figure in the history of the Polish–Lithuanian Commonwealth and the American Revolution, made several wills, notably one in 1798 stipulating that the proceeds of his American estate be spent on freeing and educating African-American slaves, including those of his friend Thomas Jefferson whom he named as the will's executor. Jefferson refused the executorship and the will was beset by legal complications, including the discovery of later wills. Jefferson's refusal incited discussion in the 19th, 20th, and 21st centuries. Kościuszko returned to Europe in 1798 and lived there until his 1817 death in Switzerland. In the 1850s, what was left of the money in Kościuszko's U.S. trust was turned over by the U.S. Supreme Court to his heirs in Europe.

== History ==
In 1798 Kościuszko decided to leave the United States and return to the Russian-controlled sector of the former Polish–Lithuanian Commonwealth. His friend Thomas Jefferson provided him with a passport in a false name and arranged for his secret departure to France. Before leaving that same year (1798) he wrote out a will, which he entrusted to Jefferson as executor. In the document, Kościuszko, over six decades before the American Civil War, pleaded for the emancipation of America's Negro slaves.

Kościuszko left his American estate to buy the freedom of black slaves, including Jefferson's own, and to educate them for independent life and work. The will read: "5th day of May 1798. I Thaddeus Kosciuszko being just in my departure from America do hereby declare and direct that should I make no other testamentary disposition of my property in the United States I hereby authorise my friend Thomas Jefferson to employ the whole thereof in purchasing Negroes from among his own or any others and giving them Liberty in my name, in giving them an education in trades or otherwise and in having them instructed for their new condition in the duties of morality which may make them good neigh bours good fathers or mothers, husbands or vives and in their duties as citizens teaching them to be defenders of their Liberty and Country and of the good order of Society and in whatsoever may Make them happy and useful, and I make the said Thomas Jefferson my executor of this. T. Kosciuszko." In September 1817, shortly before his death in October, he wrote a letter to Jefferson mentioning the bequest - "...of which money, after my death, you know the fixed destination." Several years after Kościuszko's death, Jefferson, aged 77, pleaded his inability to execute the will due to age and the numerous legal complexities of the bequest. Jefferson recommended his friend John Hartwell Cocke, who also opposed slavery, to be executor, but Cocke also declined to execute the bequest. He wrote to Jefferson that there were "prejudices to be encountered" in their education and of "an effect which might be produced on the minds of my own people." The federal court appointed an attorney, Benjamin L. Lear, to be executor of the estate. Lear died in 1832, the case still unresolved, and so his executor, Colonel George Bomford, became the executor as well of the Kościuszko estate.

Kościuszko had made a total of four wills, three of which postdated the American one. Within months after his death in October 1817, two other claims were made on his American estate; one by Kosciusko Armstrong and one by the Zeltner family, who had housed him immediately before his death. Both parties produced wills written by Kościuszko. A representative of the Russian government also made inquiries. The case of Kościuszko's American estate went three times to the U.S. Supreme Court. (Note: Associate Justice Joseph Story issued a decision to remand in Armstrong v. Lear, 25 U.S. 12 Wheat. 169 169 (1827), based on failure to submit the will for probate. The same estate was also the subject of Estho v Lear, 32 U.S. 130 (7 Pet. 130, 8 L.Ed. 632)(1832), in which Chief Justice John Marshall wrote a brief opinion suggesting remand, apparently to Virginia. Finally, the decision in Ennis v. Smith, 55 U.S. 14 How. 400 400 (1852) mentions no individual author; the chief justice was then Roger Taney, and the only jurisdictions mentioned were those of Maryland, the District of Columbia, and Grodno (now in Belarus).) In 1852 the Supreme Court awarded the estate to Kościuszko's heirs in Poland. Before the final Supreme Court decision, Gaspard Tochman, acting on behalf of Kosciusko's relatives, had found an 1816 will drawn up in Paris. This will, which revoked the one made in concert with Jefferson and the one concerning Kosciusko Armstrong, was authenticated. In light of the discovery, the Court ruled that the earlier wills treating his American assets were invalid and that these assets should be turned over to his closest living relatives.

During the legal proceedings between his death and the Supreme Court's decision, the value of his estate decreased substantially; this was attributed by a case attorney to Colonel Bomford's use of the estate for his own purposes. In its 1852 ruling, the Supreme Court stated that the June 1847 value of his US estate was $43,504.40 and that only $5,680 could be found.

None of the resources that Kościuszko had earmarked for the manumission and education of African Americans were ever used for that purpose.

== Interpretations ==
The abolitionist William Lloyd Garrison later criticized Jefferson's inaction, as have Jefferson historians since the late 20th century, including Merrill Peterson, Gary Nash and Edmund S. Morgan. In his biography of Jefferson, Peterson wrote,

The object of [Kosciuszko's] will was lost. Had Jefferson felt stronger about the object, he would have ventured the experiment, despite statutory obstacles and the shortness of years, for the experiment [of freeing his slaves] was one he often commended to others and, indeed, one he may have himself suggested to Kosciuszko.

The subject was revisited in the early 21st century. Historian Henry Wiencek strongly criticized Jefferson's refusal of the executorship. Historian Annette Gordon-Reed countered that "Kosciusko screwed up," that the will was "a litigation disaster waiting to happen", since Jefferson had learned there were later wills, and that Jefferson risked financial exposure. In a 2009 biography of Jefferson, Christopher Hitchens wrote that he "...coldly declined to execute his friend's dying wish."

== Bibliography ==
- Gardner, Monica Mary (1942). Kościuszko: A Biography. G. Allen & Unwin., ltd. p. 136., Book (Google), Book (Gutenberg)
- Nash, Gary; Hodges, Graham Russell Gao (2012). Friends of Liberty: Thomas Jefferson, Tadeusz Kosciuszko, and Agrippa Hull. New York, NY: Basic Books. p. 328. ISBN 978-0-465-03148-1.
- Storozynski, Alex (2009). The Peasant Prince: Thaddeus Kosciuszko and the Age of Revolution. St. Martin's Press, New York. p. 352. ISBN 978-1-4299-6607-8.
- Sulkin, Sidney; Sulkin, Edith (1944). The Democratic Heritage of Poland, "For Your Freedom and Ours": An Anthology. Poland: Allen & Unwin.
- Yiannopoulos, Athanassios N. (1958-05-31). "Wills of Movables in American Conflicts Law: A Critique of the Domiciliary Rule". California Law Review. Archived from the original on 2013-10-04.
