= Tadeusz Kościuszko =

Polish military leader (1746–1817)

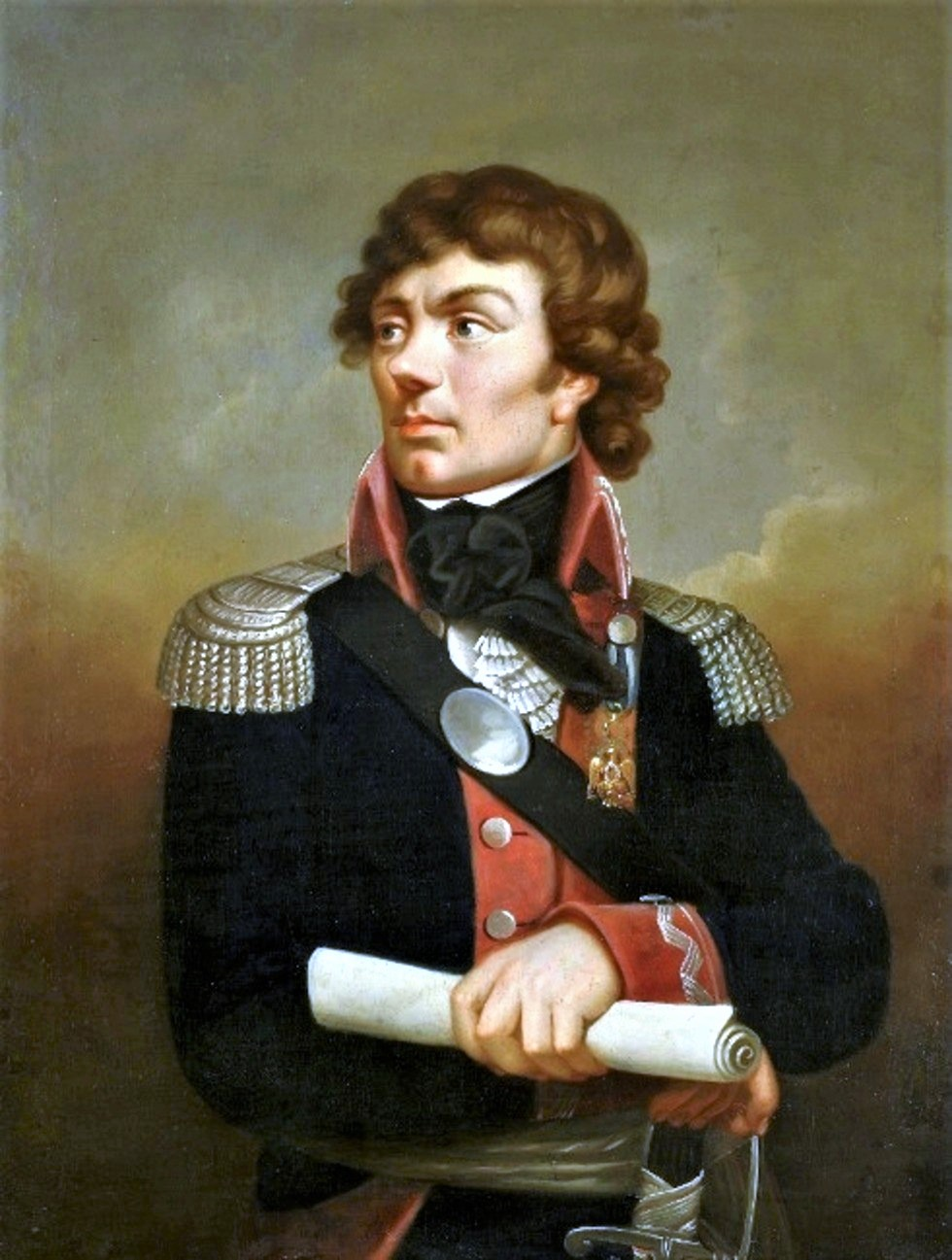
- Kościuszko, shown wearing the eagle of the Society of the Cincinnati, awarded to him by General Washington Coat of arms: Roch III
- Born: Andrzej Tadeusz Bonawentura Kościuszko; February 4, 1746; Mereczowszczyzna, Polish–Lithuanian Commonwealth
- Died: October 15, 1817 (aged 71); Solothurn, Switzerland
- Military career
- Allegiance: Polish–Lithuanian Commonwealth; United States
- Branch: Continental Army; Polish–Lithuanian Commonwealth's Army
- Service years: 1765–1776, 1784–1794 (Poland-Lithuania); 1776–1784 (United States)
- Rank: Brigadier general (United States); lieutenant-general (Poland-Lithuania)
- Units: Engineer (Continental Army); Naczelnik (commander-in-chief) (Polish Army)
- Conflicts: American Revolutionary War; Siege of Fort Ticonderoga; Battles of Saratoga; Battle of Hobkirk's Hill; Siege of Ninety Six; Battle of James Island; Polish–Russian War of 1792; Battle of Zieleńce; Battle of Dubienka; Kościuszko Uprising; Battle of Racławice; Battle of Maciejowice
- Awards: Order of Cincinnati; Virtuti Militari

Andrzej Tadeusz Bonawentura Kościuszko (Note: Polish pronunciation: [ˈandʐɛj taˈdɛ.uʐ bɔnavɛnˈtura kɔˈɕt͡ɕuʂkɔ], approximated in English as /təˈdeɪəʃ kɒʃˈtʃʊskoʊ, -ʊʃkoʊ/ tə-DAY-əsh kosh-CHUUS(H)K-oh. Lithuanian: Andrius Tadas Bonaventura Kosciuška; Belarusian: Андрэй Тадэвуш Банавэнтура Касьцюшка, romanized: Andrej Tadevuš Banaventura Kaściuška.) (English: Andrew Thaddeus Bonaventure Kosciuszko; (Note: A number of Anglicized spellings of Kościuszko's name appear in records, including the full version given here or the shorter Thaddeus Kosciuszko. The common Anglicized pronunciation of his surname is /ˌkɒsiˈʌskoʊ/ KOSS-ee-USK-oh. However, the pronunciation in Mount Kosciuszko is /ˌkɒziˈʌskoʊ/ KOZ-ee-USK-oh.) February 4 or 12, 1746 – October 15, 1817) was a Polish military engineer, statesman, and military leader who became a national hero in Poland, the United States, Lithuania, and Belarus. He fought in the Polish–Lithuanian Commonwealth's struggles against Russia and Prussia, and on the U.S. side in the American Revolutionary War. As Supreme Commander of the Polish National Armed Forces, he led the 1794 Kościuszko Uprising.

Kościuszko was born in February 1746, in a manor house on the Mereczowszczyzna estate in Brest Litovsk Voivodeship, then Grand Duchy of Lithuania, a part of the Polish–Lithuanian Commonwealth, now the Ivatsevichy District of Belarus. At age 20, he graduated from the Corps of Cadets in Warsaw, Poland. After the start of the War of the Bar Confederation in 1768, Kościuszko moved to France in 1769 to study. He returned to the Commonwealth in 1774, two years after the First Partition, and was a tutor in Józef Sylwester Sosnowski's household. In 1776, Kościuszko moved to North America, where he took part in the American Revolutionary War as a colonel in the Continental Army. An accomplished military architect, he designed and oversaw the construction of state-of-the-art fortifications, including those at West Point, New York. In 1783, in recognition of his services, the Continental Congress promoted him to brigadier general.

Upon returning to Poland in 1784, Kościuszko was commissioned as a major general in the Polish–Lithuanian Commonwealth Army in 1789. After the Polish–Russian War of 1792 resulted in the Commonwealth's Second Partition, he commanded an uprising against the Russian Empire in March 1794 until he was captured at the Battle of Maciejowice in October 1794. The defeat of the Kościuszko Uprising that November led to Poland's Third Partition in 1795, which ended the Commonwealth. In 1796, following the death of Tsaritsa Catherine II, Kościuszko was pardoned by her successor, Tsar Paul I, and he emigrated to the United States. A close friend of Thomas Jefferson, with whom he shared ideals of human rights, Kościuszko wrote a will in 1798, dedicating his U.S. assets to the education and freedom of the U.S. slaves. Kościuszko eventually returned to Europe and lived in Switzerland until his death in 1817. The execution of his testament later proved difficult, and the funds were never used for the purpose he intended.

== Early life ==
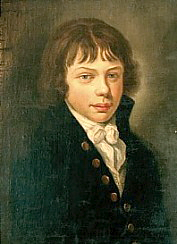
Kościuszko, aged 15, in 1761

Kościuszko was born in February 1746 in a manor house on the Mereczowszczyzna estate near Kosów in Nowogródek Voivodeship, Grand Duchy of Lithuania, a part of the Polish–Lithuanian Commonwealth, present-day Belarus. His exact birthdate is unknown; commonly cited are February 4 and February 12. (Note: Alex Storozynski, in his 2009 biography of Kościuszko, notes that the "twelfth is generally used", and that Szyndler (1991:103) discusses theories about Kościuszko's birthdate.)

Kościuszko was the youngest son of a member of the szlachta (untitled Polish nobility), Ludwik Tadeusz Kościuszko, an officer in the Polish–Lithuanian Commonwealth Army, and his wife Tekla Ratomska. The family held the Polish Roch III coat of arms. At the time of Tadeusz Kościuszko's birth, the family possessed modest landholdings in the Grand Duchy worked by 31 peasant families.

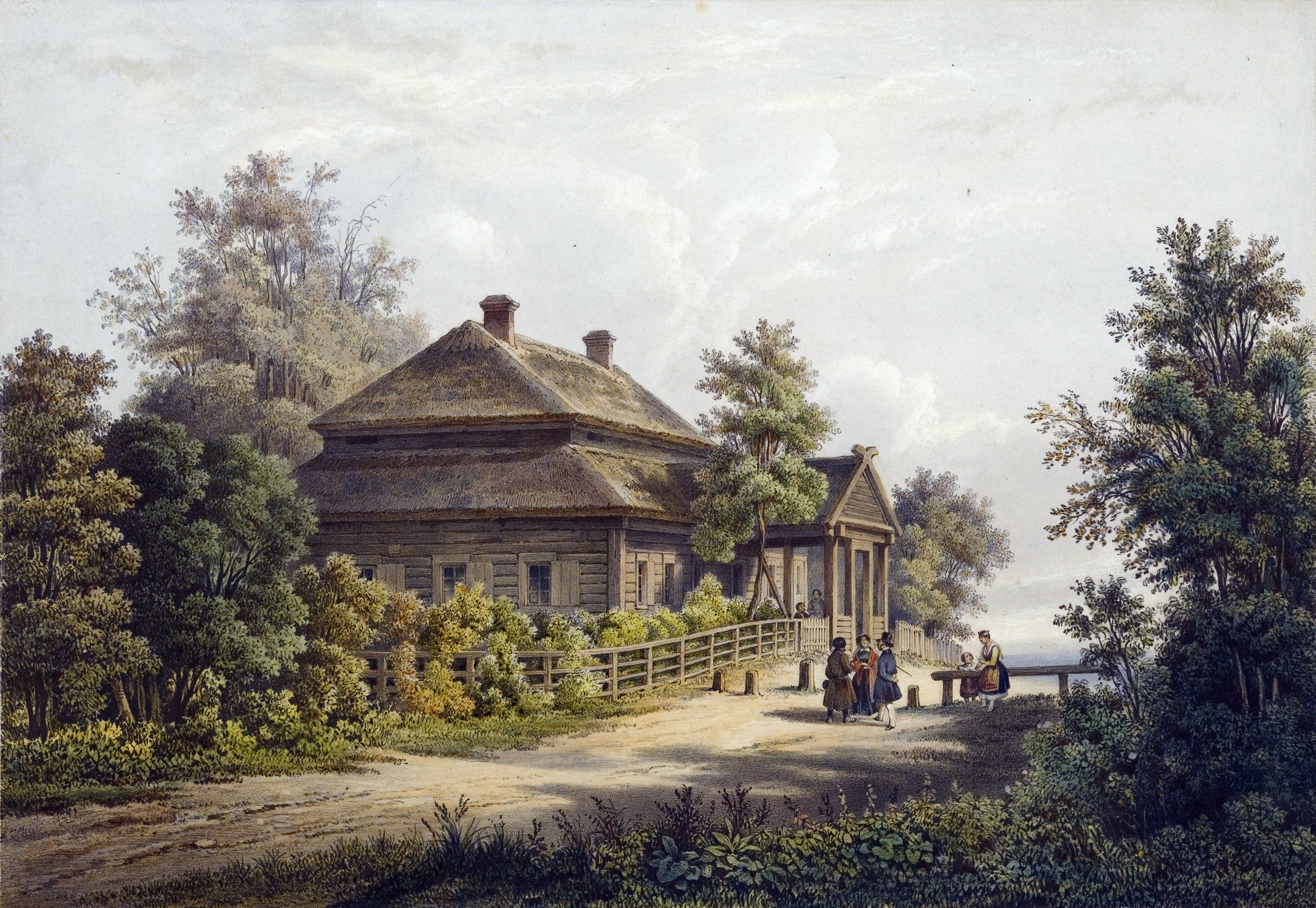
Mereczowszczyzna manor where Kościuszko was born in 1746

Tadeusz was baptized in the Catholic church, thereby receiving the names Andrzej, Tadeusz, and Bonawentura. His paternal family was originally Ruthenian and traced their ancestry to Konstanty Fiodorowicz Kostiuszko, a courtier of Polish King and Grand Duke of Lithuania Sigismund I the Old. Kościuszko's maternal family, the Ratomskis, were also Ruthenian.

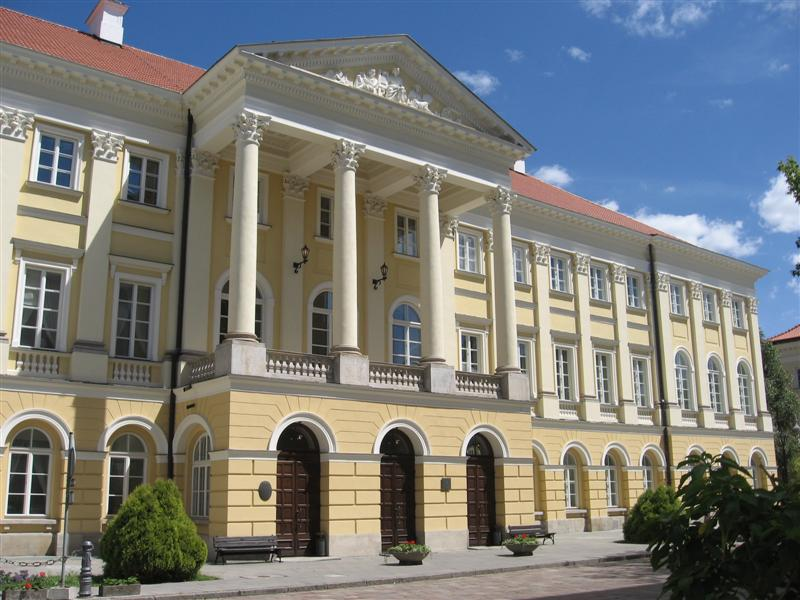
Kazimierz Palace, where Kościuszko attended the Corps of Cadets

His family had become Polonized as early as the 16th century. Like most Polish–Lithuanian nobility of the time, the Kościuszkos spoke Polish and identified with Polish culture. Kościuszko also, as was common for Polish nobility in the region, clearly stressed his attachment to the multiethnic Identity of the Grand Duchy of Lithuania in later letters. For example, in 1790 Kościuszko wrote "If this does not soften you and you do not raise my case in the Sejm so that I can return, I myself will probably, God sees, do something bad to myself, as I am angry because being from Lithuania I serve the Kingdom [of Poland] when you do not have three generals", while during the Uprising of 1794 Kościuszko wrote "Lithuania! My countrymen and tribesmen! I was born in your land, sincere love for my homeland evokes in me a special favor for those among whom I began my life".

In 1755, Kościuszko began attending school in Lubieszów but never finished due to his family's financial straits after his father's death in 1758. King Stanisław August Poniatowski established a Corps of Cadets (Korpus Kadetów) in 1765, at what is now Warsaw University, to educate military officers and government officials. Kościuszko enrolled in the Corps on December 18, 1765, likely thanks to the Czartoryski family's patronage. The school emphasized military subjects and the liberal arts, and after graduating on December 20, 1766, Kościuszko was promoted to chorąży, a military rank roughly equivalent to modern lieutenant. He stayed on as a student instructor and, by 1768, had attained the rank of captain.

=== European travels ===
In 1768, civil war broke out in the Polish–Lithuanian Commonwealth, when the Bar Confederation sought to depose King Stanisław August Poniatowski. One of Kościuszko's brothers, Józef, fought on the side of the insurgents. Faced with a difficult choice between the rebels and his sponsors—the King and the Czartoryski family, who favored a gradualist approach to shedding Russian domination—Kościuszko chose to leave Poland. In late 1769, he and a colleague, artist Aleksander Orłowski, were granted royal scholarships; on October 5, they embarked for Paris. They wanted to further their military education. As foreigners, they were barred from enrolling in French military academies, and so they enrolled in the Royal Academy of Painting and Sculpture. There Kościuszko pursued his interest in drawing and painting and took private lessons in architecture from architect Jean-Rodolphe Perronet. (Note: Sketches from Kościuszko's hand still survive and are guarded as national treasures in Polish museums.)

Kościuszko did not give up on improving his military knowledge. He audited lectures for five years and frequented the libraries of the Paris military academies. His exposure to the French Enlightenment, along with the religious tolerance practised in the Polish–Lithuanian Commonwealth, strongly influenced his later career. The French economic theory of physiocracy made a particularly strong impression on his thinking. He also developed his artistic skills, and while his career took him in a different direction, all his life he continued drawing and painting.

In the First Partition of the Polish–Lithuanian Commonwealth in 1772, Russia, Prussia, and Austria annexed large swaths of Commonwealth territory and gained influence over the internal politics. When Kościuszko returned home in 1774, he found that his brother Józef had squandered most of the family fortune, and there was no place for him in the Army, as he could not afford to buy an officer's commission. He took a position as tutor to the family of the magnate, province governor (voivode) and hetman Józef Sylwester Sosnowski and fell in love with the governor's daughter Ludwika. (Note: After he returned to Poland from America and sought a Polish Army commission, the then-Princess Lubomirska—she had been forced by her father to marry into the higher nobility—urged the King to offer Kościuszko a commission. When he went to Warsaw in the summer of 1789 to pursue the matter, he encountered her at a ball. As his companion Julian Ursyn Niemcewicz later recounted, "The meeting was so emotional [for both] that they were unable to speak to each other; each moved away to a different corner of the salon and wept." In 1791, he sought to marry Tekla Zurowska, but again met paternal opposition.) Their elopement was thwarted by her father's retainers. Kościuszko received a thrashing at their hands, an event that may have led to his antipathy for class distinctions, though historian Halina Filipowicz has suggested that the focus on this heterosexual affair by biographers could have been used as a device to hide homosexual inclinations.

In the autumn of 1775 he emigrated to avoid Sosnowski and his retainers. In late 1775 he attempted to join the Saxon army but was turned down and decided to return to Paris. There he learned of the American Revolutionary War outbreak, in which the British colonies in North America had revolted against the British Crown and begun their struggle for independence. The first American successes were well-publicized in France, and the French people and government openly supported the revolutionaries' cause.

== American Revolutionary War ==
On learning of the American Revolution, Kościuszko sailed for America in June 1776, along with other foreign officers, likely with the help of Pierre Beaumarchais, a French supporter of American independence. He arrived in Philadelphia after a Caribbean shipwreck, where he sought out Benjamin Franklin at his print shop. He offered to take engineering subject exams in lieu of any letters of recommendation, and he received a high mark on a geometry exam and Franklin's recommendation. On August 30, 1776, Kościuszko submitted an application to the Second Continental Congress at the Pennsylvania State House, and he was assigned to the Continental Army the next day.

=== Northern region ===
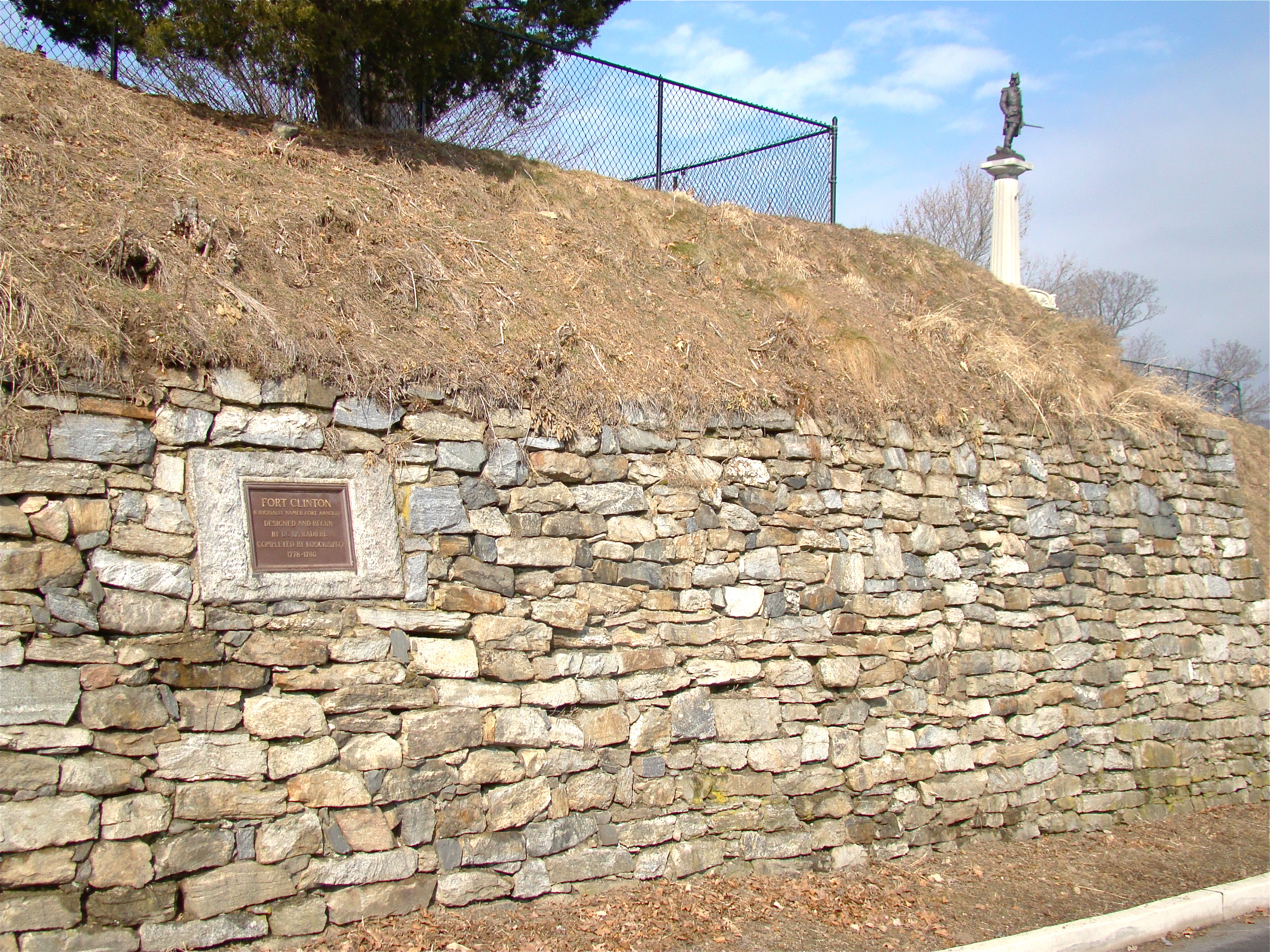
Fort Clinton (West Point), fortified by Kościuszko, honored by a statue in background

Kościuszko's first task was building fortifications at Fort Billingsport in Paulsboro, New Jersey, to protect the banks of the Delaware River and prevent a possible British advance up the river to Philadelphia. He initially served as a volunteer in the private employ of Benjamin Franklin, but on October 18, 1776, Congress commissioned him a colonel of engineers in the Continental Army.

In spring 1777, Kościuszko was attached to the Northern Army under Major General Horatio Gates, arriving at the Canada–U.S. border in May 1777. Subsequently, posted to Fort Ticonderoga, he reviewed the defenses of what had been one of the most formidable fortresses in North America. His surveys prompted him to strongly recommend the construction of a battery on Sugar Loaf, a high point overlooking the fort. His prudent recommendation, with which his fellow engineers concurred, was turned down by the garrison commander, Brigadier General Arthur St. Clair.

This proved a tactical blunder: when a British army under Major General John Burgoyne arrived in July 1777, Burgoyne did exactly what Kościuszko had warned of, and had his engineers place artillery on the hill. With the British in complete control of the high ground, the Americans realized their situation was hopeless and abandoned the fortress with hardly a shot fired in the siege of Ticonderoga. The British advance force nipped hard at the heels of the outnumbered and exhausted Continentals as they fled south. Major General Philip Schuyler, desperate to put distance between his men and their pursuers, ordered Kościuszko to delay the enemy. Kościuszko designed an engineer's solution: his men felled trees, dammed streams, and destroyed bridges and causeways. Encumbered by their huge supply train, the British began to bog down, giving the Americans the time needed to safely withdraw across the Hudson River.

Gates tapped Kościuszko to survey the country between the opposing armies, choose the most defensible position, and fortify it. Finding just such a spot near Saratoga, overlooking the Hudson at Bemis Heights, Kościuszko laid out a robust array of defenses, nearly impregnable. His judgment and meticulous attention to detail frustrated the British attacks during the Battle of Saratoga, and Gates accepted the surrender of Burgoyne's force there on October 16, 1777. The dwindling British army had been dealt a sound defeat, turning the tide to American advantage. Kościuszko's work at Saratoga received great praise from Gates, who later told his friend, Dr. Benjamin Rush: "The great tacticians of the campaign were hills and forests, which a young Polish engineer was skillful enough to select for my encampment."

At some point in 1777, Kościuszko composed a polonaise and scored it for the harpsichord. Named for him, and with lyrics by Rajnold Suchodolski, it later became popular with Polish patriots during the November 1830 Uprising. Around that time, Kościuszko was assigned an African American orderly, Agrippa Hull, whom he treated as an equal and a friend.

In March 1778, Kościuszko arrived at West Point, New York, and spent more than two years strengthening the fortifications and improving the stronghold's defenses. It was these defenses that the American General Benedict Arnold subsequently attempted to surrender to the British when he defected. Soon after Kościuszko finished fortifying West Point, in August 1780, General George Washington granted Kościuszko's request to transfer to combat duty with the Southern Army. Kościuszko's West Point fortifications were widely praised as innovative for the time.

=== Southern region ===
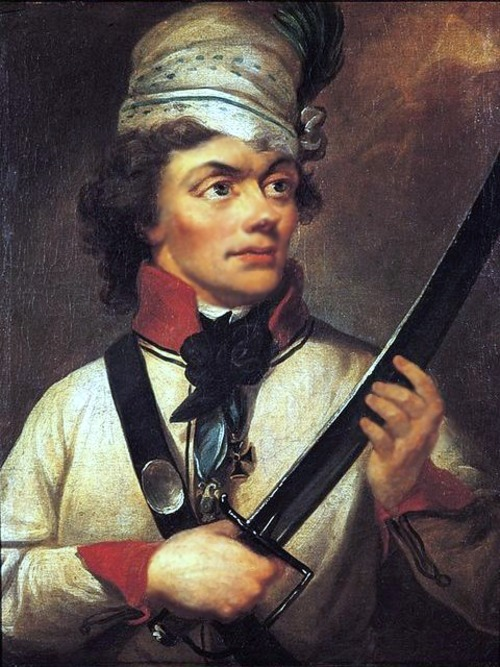
Portrait by Kazimierz Wojniakowski

After travelling south through rural Virginia in October 1780, Kościuszko proceeded to North Carolina to report to his former commander General Gates. Following Gates's disastrous defeat at Camden on August 16, 1780, the Continental Congress selected Washington's choice, Major General Nathanael Greene, to replace Gates as commander of the Southern Department. When Greene formally assumed command on December 3, 1780, he retained Kościuszko as his chief engineer. By then, he had been praised by both Gates and Greene.

During this campaign, Kościuszko was placed in command of building bateaux, siting the location for camps, scouting river crossings, fortifying positions, and developing intelligence contacts. Many of his contributions were instrumental in preventing the destruction of the Southern Army. This was especially so during the "Race to the Dan", when British General Charles Cornwallis chased Greene across 200 miles (320 km) of rough backcountry in January and February 1781. Thanks largely to a combination of Greene's tactics, Kościuszko's bateaux, and accurate scouting of the rivers ahead of the main body, the Continentals safely crossed each river, including the Yadkin and the Dan. Cornwallis, having no boats, and finding no way to cross the swollen Dan, abandoned the chase and withdrew into North Carolina. The Continentals regrouped south of Halifax, Virginia, where Kościuszko had earlier, at Greene's request, established a fortified depot.

During the Race to the Dan, Kościuszko had helped select the site where Greene eventually returned to fight Cornwallis at Guilford Courthouse. Though tactically defeated, the Americans all but destroyed Cornwallis's army as an effective fighting force and gained a permanent strategic advantage in the South. Thus, when Greene began his reconquest of South Carolina in the spring of 1781, he summoned Kościuszko to rejoin the main body of the Southern Army. The combined forces of the Continentals and Southern militia gradually forced the British from the backcountry into the coastal ports during the latter half of 1781 and, on April 25, Kościuszko participated in the Second Battle of Camden. At Ninety-Six, Kościuszko besieged the Star Fort from May 22 to June 18. During the unsuccessful siege, he suffered his only wound in seven years of service, bayonetted in the buttocks during an assault by the fort's defenders on the approach trench that he was constructing.

Kościuszko subsequently helped fortify the American bases in North Carolina, before taking part in several smaller operations in the final year of hostilities, harassing British foraging parties near Charleston, South Carolina. After the death of his friend, Colonel John Laurens, Kościuszko became engaged in these operations, taking over Laurens's intelligence network in the area. He commanded two cavalry squadrons and an infantry unit, and his last known battlefield command of the war occurred at James Island, South Carolina, on November 14, 1782. In what has been described as the Continental Army's final armed action of the war, he was nearly killed as his small force was routed. A month later, he was among the Continental troops that reoccupied Charleston following the city's British evacuation. Kościuszko spent the rest of the war there, conducting a fireworks display on April 23, 1783, to celebrate the signing of the Treaty of Paris earlier that month.

=== Leaving for home ===
Having not been paid in his seven years of service, in late May 1783, Kościuszko decided to collect the salary owed to him. That year, he was asked by Congress to supervise the fireworks during the July 4 celebrations at Princeton, New Jersey. On October 13, 1783, Congress promoted him to brigadier general, but he still had not received his back pay. Many other officers and soldiers were in the same situation. While waiting for his pay, unable to finance a voyage back to Europe, Kościuszko, like several others, lived on money borrowed from the Polish–Jewish banker Haym Solomon. Eventually, he received a certificate for 12,280 dollars, at 6%, to be paid in monthly installments beginning on January 1, 1784 (US$12,280 in 1784 is US$286,000 in 2025), and the right to 500 acres (202.34 ha; 0.78 sq mi) of land, but only if he chose to settle in the United States.

For the winter of 1783–84, his former commanding officer, General Greene, invited Kościuszko to stay at his mansion. He was inducted into the Society of the Cincinnati and into the American Philosophical Society in 1785. During the Revolution, Kościuszko carried an old Spanish sword at his side, which was inscribed with the words Do not draw me without reason; do not sheathe me without honour.

== Polish–Lithuanian Commonwealth ==
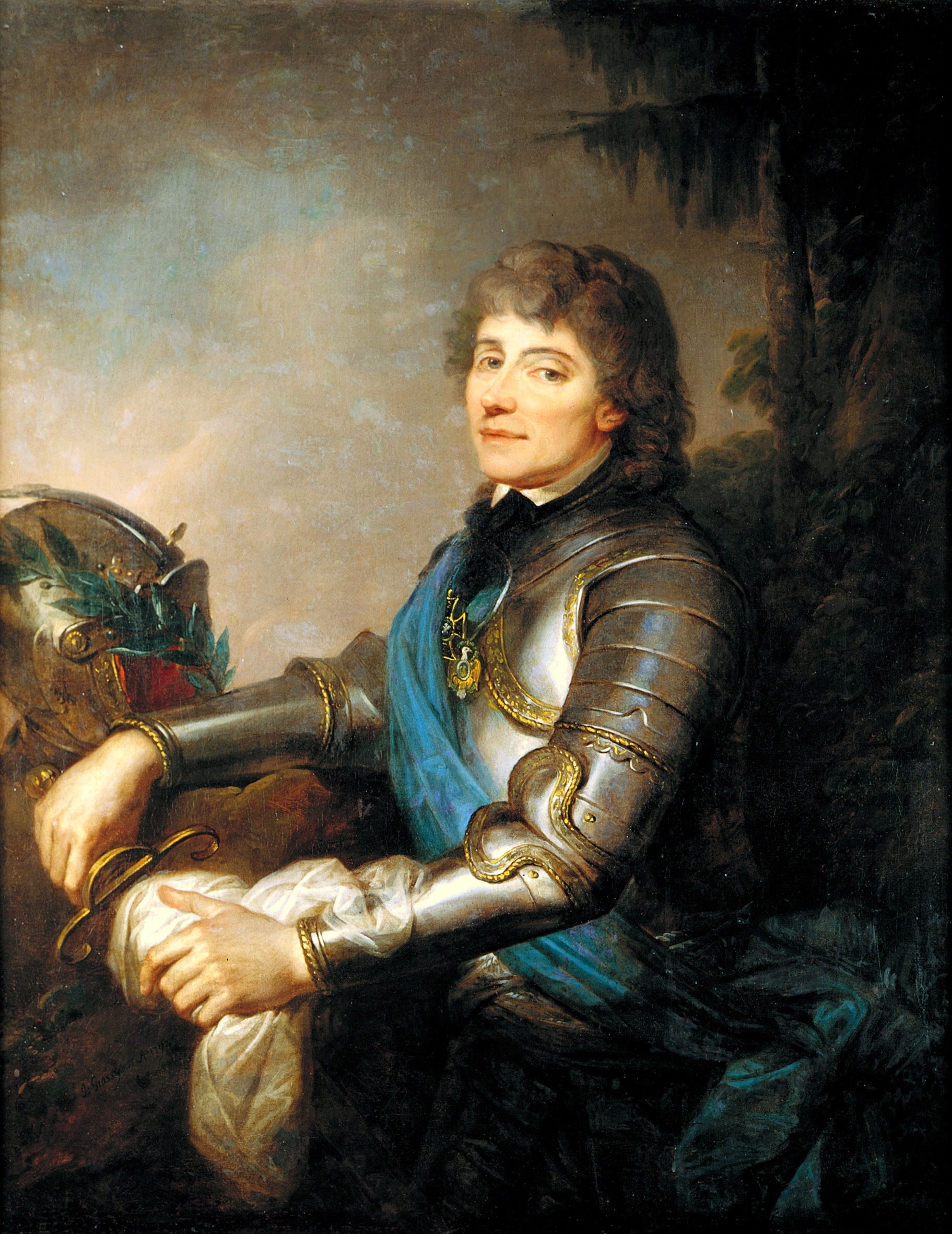
Portrait by Josef Grassi, 1792

On July 15, 1784, Kościuszko set off for Poland, where he arrived on August 26. Due to a conflict between his patrons, the Czartoryski family, and King Stanisław August Poniatowski, Kościuszko once again failed to get a commission in the Commonwealth Army. He settled in a small town called Siechnowicze. His brother Józef had lost most of the family's lands through bad investments, but with the help of his sister Anna, Kościuszko secured part of the lands for himself. He decided to limit his male peasants' corvée (obligatory service to the lord of the manor) to two days a week and completely exempted the female peasants. His estate soon stopped being profitable, and he began going into debt. The situation was not helped by the failure of the money promised by the American government—interest on late payment for his seven years' military service—to materialize. Kościuszko struck up friendships with liberal activists; Hugo Kołłątaj offered him a position as lecturer at Kraków's Jagiellonian University, which Kościuszko declined.

The Great Sejm of 1788–1792 introduced some reforms, including a planned build-up of the army to defend the Commonwealth's borders. Kościuszko saw a chance to return to military service and spent some time in Warsaw, among those who engaged in the political debates outside the Great Sejm. He wrote a proposal to create a militia force, on the American model. As political pressure grew to build up the army, and Kościuszko's political allies gained influence with the King, Kościuszko again applied for a commission, and on October 12, 1789, received a royal commission as a major general, but to Kosciuszko's dismay in the Army of the Kingdom of Poland.

He began receiving a high salary of 12,000 zlotys a year, ending his financial difficulties. On February 1, 1790, he reported for duty in Włocławek, and wrote in a letter after a few days, calling the local inhabitants "lazy" and "careless", in contrast to "good and economical Lithuanians". In the same letter, Kosciuszko begged general Franciszek Ksawery Niesiołowski for a transfer to the Army of the Grand Duchy of Lithuania, but his wishes were not granted. Around summer, he commanded some infantry and cavalry units in the region between the Bug and Vistula Rivers. In August 1790 he was posted to Volhynia, stationed near Starokostiantyniv and Międzyborze. Prince Józef Poniatowski, who was the King's nephew, recognized Kościuszko's superior experience and made him his second-in-command, leaving him in command when he was absent.

Meanwhile, Kościuszko became more closely involved with political reformers such as Hugo Kołłątaj, Julian Ursyn Niemcewicz and others. Kościuszko argued that the peasants and Jews should receive full citizenship status, as this would motivate them to help defend Poland in the event of war. The political reformers centered in the Patriotic Party scored a significant victory with adopting the Constitution of 3 May 1791. Kościuszko saw the Constitution as a step in the right direction, but was disappointed that it retained the monarchy and did little to improve the situation of the most underprivileged, the peasants and the Jews. The Commonwealth's neighbors saw the Constitution's reforms as a threat to their influence over Polish internal affairs. A year after the Constitution's adoption, on May 14, 1792, reactionary magnates formed the Targowica Confederation, which asked Russia's Tsaritsa Catherine II for help in overthrowing the Constitution. Four days later, on May 18, 1792, a 100,000-man Russian army crossed the Polish border, headed for Warsaw, beginning the Polish–Russian War of 1792.

=== Defense of the Constitution ===
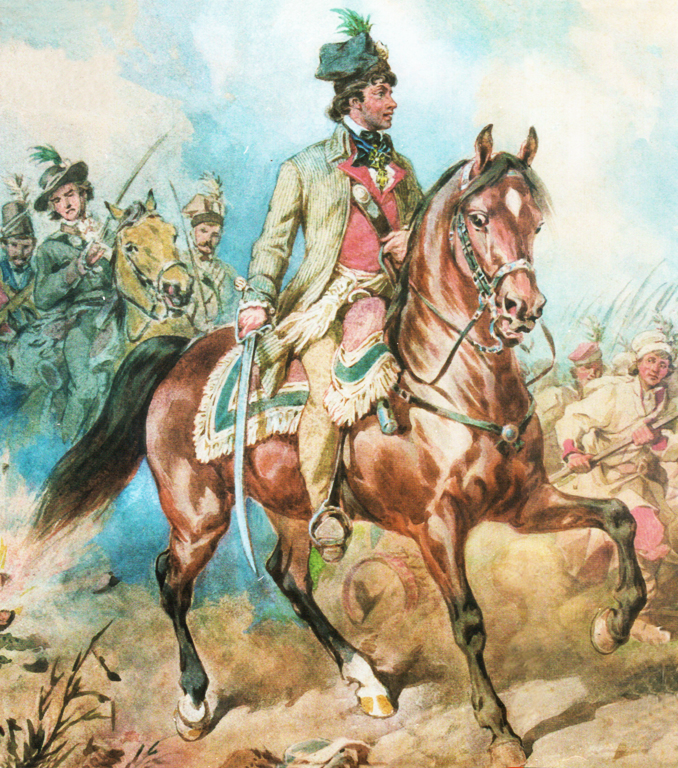
Kościuszko, by Juliusz Kossak

The Russians had a 3:1 advantage in strength, with some 98,000 troops against 37,000 Poles; they also had an advantage in combat experience. Before the Russians invaded, Kościuszko had been appointed deputy commander of Prince Józef Poniatowski's infantry division, stationed in West Ukraine. When the Prince became Commander-in-Chief of the entire Polish (Crown) Army on May 3, 1792, Kościuszko was given command of a division near Kiev.

The Russians attacked a wide front with three armies. Kościuszko proposed that the entire Polish army be concentrated and engage one of the Russian armies, to assure numerical parity and boost the morale of the most inexperienced Polish forces with a quick victory; but Poniatowski rejected this plan. On May 22, 1792, the Russian forces crossed the border in Ukraine, where Kościuszko and Poniatowski were stationed. The Crown Army was judged too weak to oppose the four enemy columns advancing into West Ukraine, and began a fighting withdrawal to the western side of the Southern Bug River, with Kościuszko commanding the rear guard.

On June 18, Poniatowski won the Battle of Zieleńce; Kościuszko's division, on detached rear-guard duty, did not take part in the battle and rejoined the main army only at nightfall. His diligent protection of the main army's rear and flanks won him the newly created Virtuti Militari, to this day Poland's highest military decoration. Storożyński states that Kościuszko received the Virtuti Militari for his later, July 18 victory at Dubienka. The Polish withdrawal continued, and on July 7 Kościuszko's forces fought a delaying battle against the Russians at Volodymyr-Volynskyi, the Battle of Włodzimierz. On reaching the northern Bug River, the Polish Army was split into three divisions to hold the river defensive line—weakening the Poles' point of numerical superiority, against Kościuszko's counsel of a single strong, concentrated army.

Kościuszko's force was assigned to protect the front's southern flank, touching up to the Austrian border. At the Battle of Dubienka (July 18, 1792), Kościuszko repulsed a numerically superior enemy, skilfully using terrain obstacles and field fortifications, and came to be regarded as one of Poland's most brilliant military commanders of the age. With some 5,300 men, he was confronted by a force of 25,000 Russians led by General Michail Kachovski. Kościuszko had to retreat from Dubienka, as the Russians crossed the nearby Austrian border and began flanking his positions. Russians won the battle.

After the battle, King Stanisław August Poniatowski promoted Kościuszko to lieutenant-general and also offered him the Order of the White Eagle, but Kościuszko, a convinced republican would not accept a royal honor. News of Kościuszko's victory spread over Europe, and on August 26 he received the honorary citizenship of France from the Legislative Assembly of revolutionary France. While Kościuszko considered the war's outcome to still be unsettled, the King requested a ceasefire. On July 24, 1792, before Kościuszko had received his promotion to lieutenant-general, the King shocked the army by announcing his accession to the Targowica Confederation and ordering the Polish–Lithuanian troops to cease hostilities against the Russians. Kościuszko considered abducting the King as the Bar Confederates had done two decades earlier, in 1771, but was dissuaded by Prince Józef Poniatowski. On August 30, Kościuszko resigned from his army position and briefly returned to Warsaw, where he received his promotion and pay, but refused the King's request to remain in the Army. Around that time, he also fell ill with jaundice.

== Émigré ==
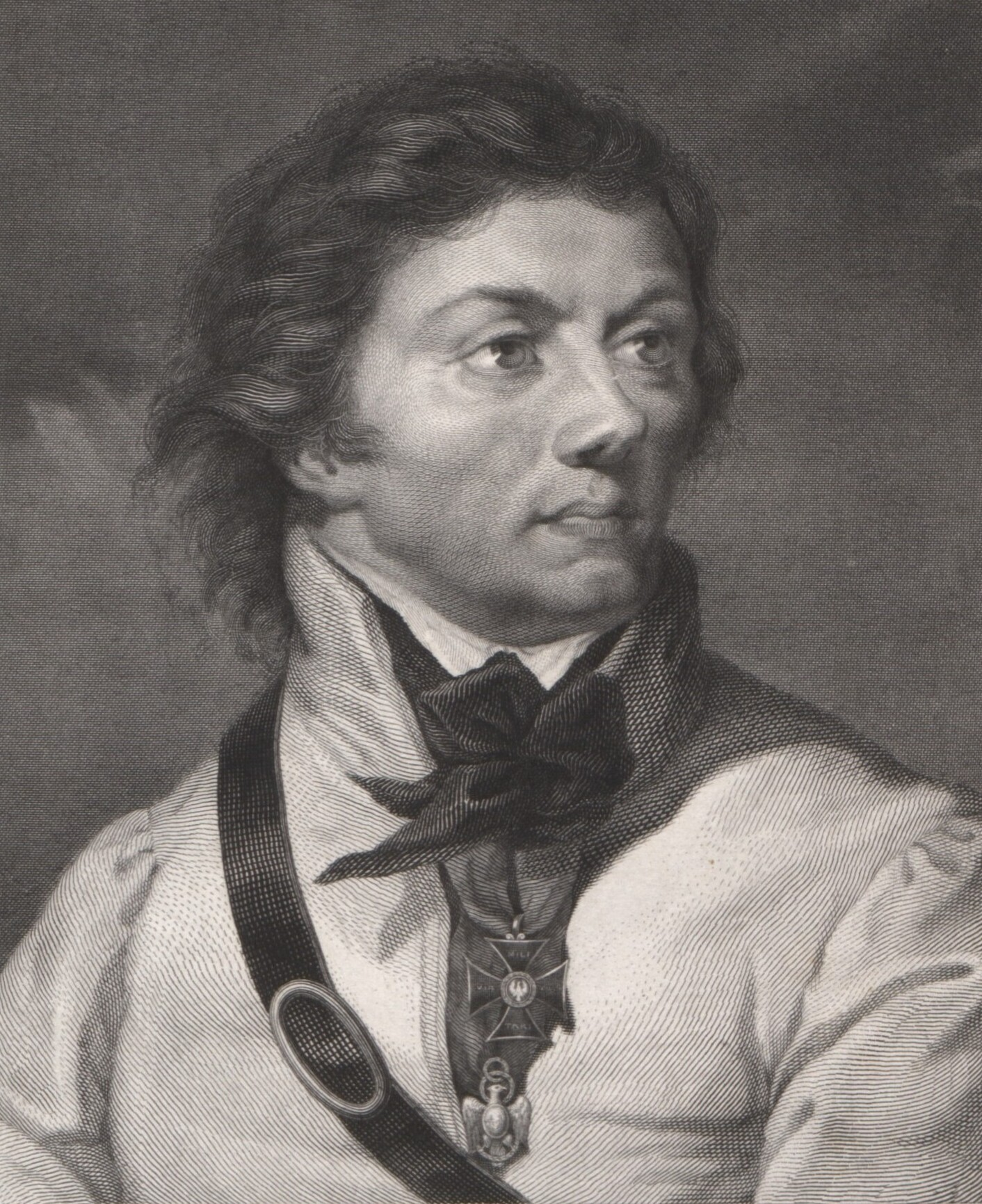
Kościuszko wearing the Virtuti Militari and, below it, the Eagle of the Cincinnati

The King's capitulation was a hard blow for Kościuszko, who had not lost a single battle in the campaign. By mid-September 1792, he was resigned to leaving the country, and in early October, he departed from Warsaw. First, he went east, to the Czartoryski family manor at Sieniawa, which gathered various malcontents. In mid-November, he spent two weeks in Lwów, where he was welcomed by the populace. Since the war's end, his presence had drawn crowds eager to see the famed commander. Izabela Czartoryska discussed having him marry her daughter Zofia. The Russians planned to arrest him if he returned to territory under their control; the Austrians, who held Lwów, offered him a commission in the Austrian Army, which he turned down. Subsequently, they planned to deport him, but he left Lwów before they could do so. At the turn of the month, he stopped in Zamość at the Zamoyskis' estate, met Stanisław Staszic, then went on to Puławy.

He did not tarry there for long: on December 12–13, he was in Kraków; on December 17, in Wrocław; and shortly after, he settled in Leipzig, where many notable Polish soldiers and politicians formed an émigré community. Soon he and some others began plotting an uprising against Russian rule in Poland. The politicians, grouped around Ignacy Potocki and Hugo Kołłątaj, sought contacts with similar opposition groups in Poland and by spring 1793 had been joined by other politicians and revolutionaries, including Ignacy Działyński. While Kołłątaj and others had begun planning an uprising before Kościuszko joined them, his support was a significant boon to them, as he was among the most famous individuals in Poland.

After two weeks in Leipzig, before the second week of January 1793, Kościuszko set off for Paris, where he tried to gain French support for Poland's planned uprising. He stayed there until summer, but despite the growing revolutionary influence, the French paid only lip service to the Polish cause and refused to commit themselves to anything concrete. Kościuszko concluded that the French authorities were not interested in Poland beyond what use it could have for their cause, and he was increasingly disappointed in the pettiness of the French Revolution—the infighting among different factions, and the growing reign of terror.

On January 23, 1793, Prussia and Russia signed the Second Partition of Poland. The Grodno Sejm, convened under duress in June, ratified the partition and was also forced to rescind the Constitution of May 3, 1791. With the second partition, Poland became a small country of roughly 200,000 square kilometers (77,000 sq mi) and a population of some 4 million. This came as a shock to the Targowica Confederates, who had seen themselves as defenders of centuries-old privileges of the magnates but had hardly expected that their appeal for help to the Tsarina of Russia would further reduce and weaken their country.

In August 1793, Kościuszko, though worried that an uprising would have little chance against the three partitioning powers, returned to Leipzig, where he was met with demands to start planning one as soon as possible. In September he clandestinely crossed the Polish border to conduct personal observations and meet with sympathetic high-ranking officers in the residual Polish Army, including General Józef Wodzicki. The preparations went slowly, and he left for Italy, planning to return in February 1794. However, the situation in Poland was changing rapidly. The Russian and Prussian governments forced Poland to again disband most of her army, and the reduced units were to be incorporated into the Russian Army. In March, Tsarist agents discovered the revolutionaries in Warsaw and began arresting notable Polish politicians and military commanders. Kościuszko was forced to execute his plan earlier than he had intended and, on March 15, 1794, set off for Kraków.

== Kościuszko Uprising ==
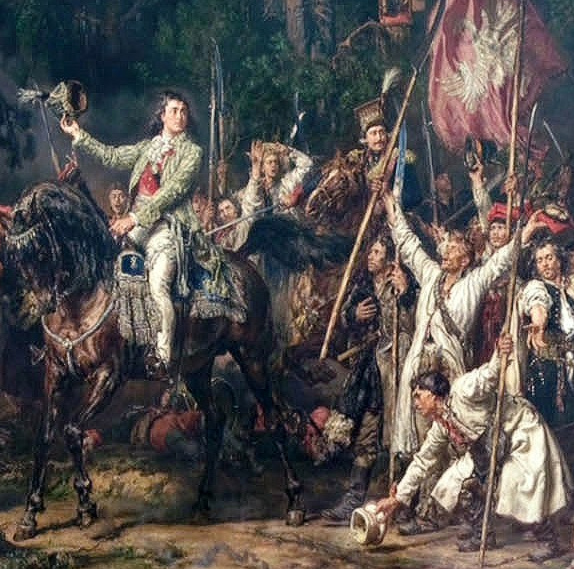
Kościuszko and his peasant scythemen, from Matejko's Kościuszko at Racławice

Learning that the Russian garrison had departed Kraków, Kościuszko entered the city on the night of March 23, 1794. The next morning, in the Main Square, he announced an uprising. Kościuszko received the title of Naczelnik (commander-in-chief) of Polish–Lithuanian forces fighting against the Russian occupation.

Kościuszko gathered an army of some 6,000, including 4,000 regular soldiers and 2,000 recruits, and marched on Warsaw. The Russians succeeded in organizing an army to oppose him more quickly than he had expected. Still, he scored a victory at Racławice on April 4, 1794, where he turned the tide by personally leading an infantry charge of peasant volunteers (kosynierzy, scythemen). Nonetheless, this Russian defeat was not strategically significant, and the Russian forces quickly forced Kościuszko to retreat toward Kraków. Near Połaniec he received reinforcements and met with other Uprising leaders (Kołłątaj, Potocki); at Połaniec he issued a major political declaration of the Uprising, the Proclamation of Połaniec. The declaration stated that serfs were entitled to civil rights and reduced their work obligations (corvée). Meanwhile, the Russians set a bounty for Kościuszko's capture, "dead or alive".

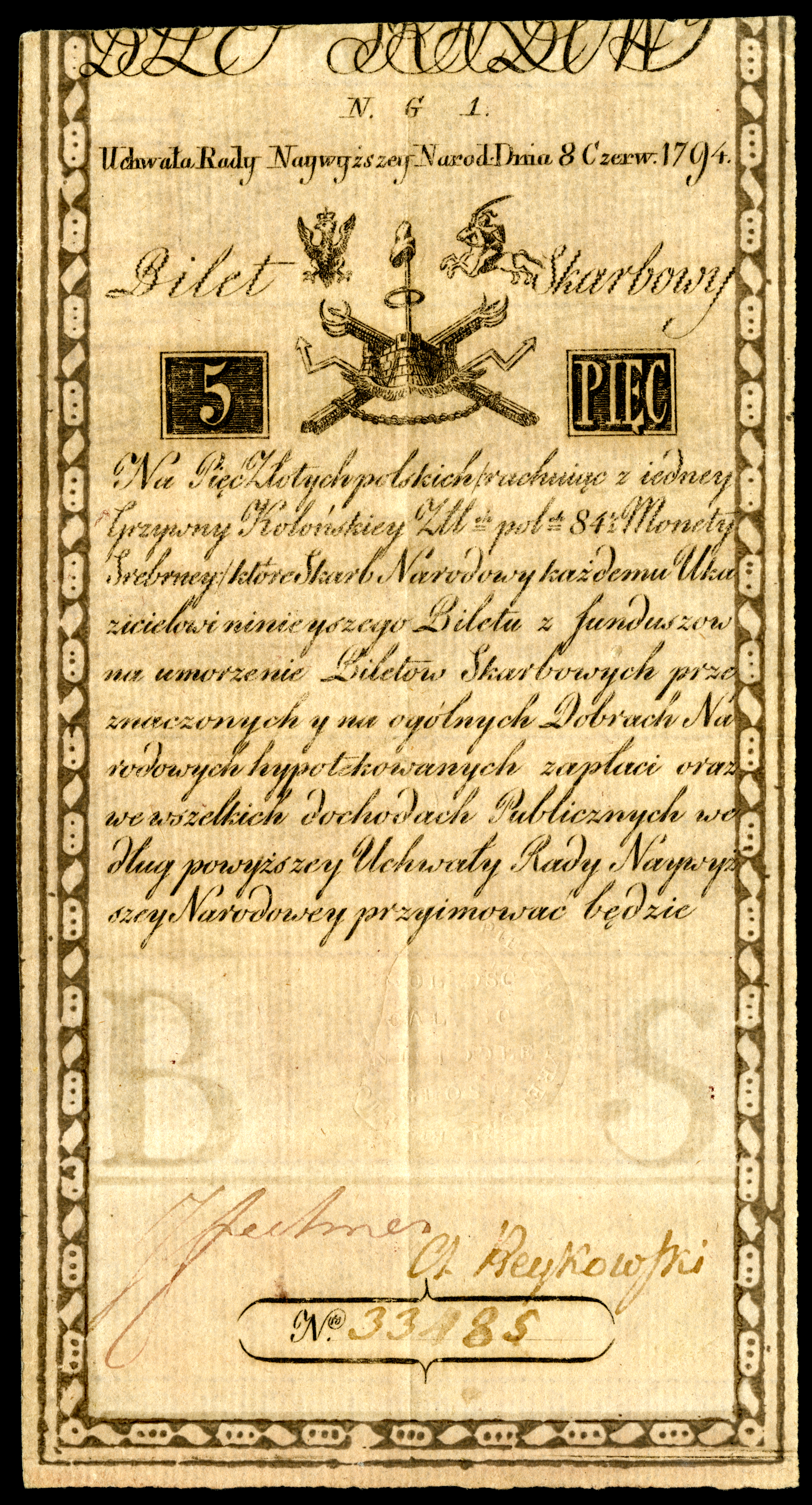
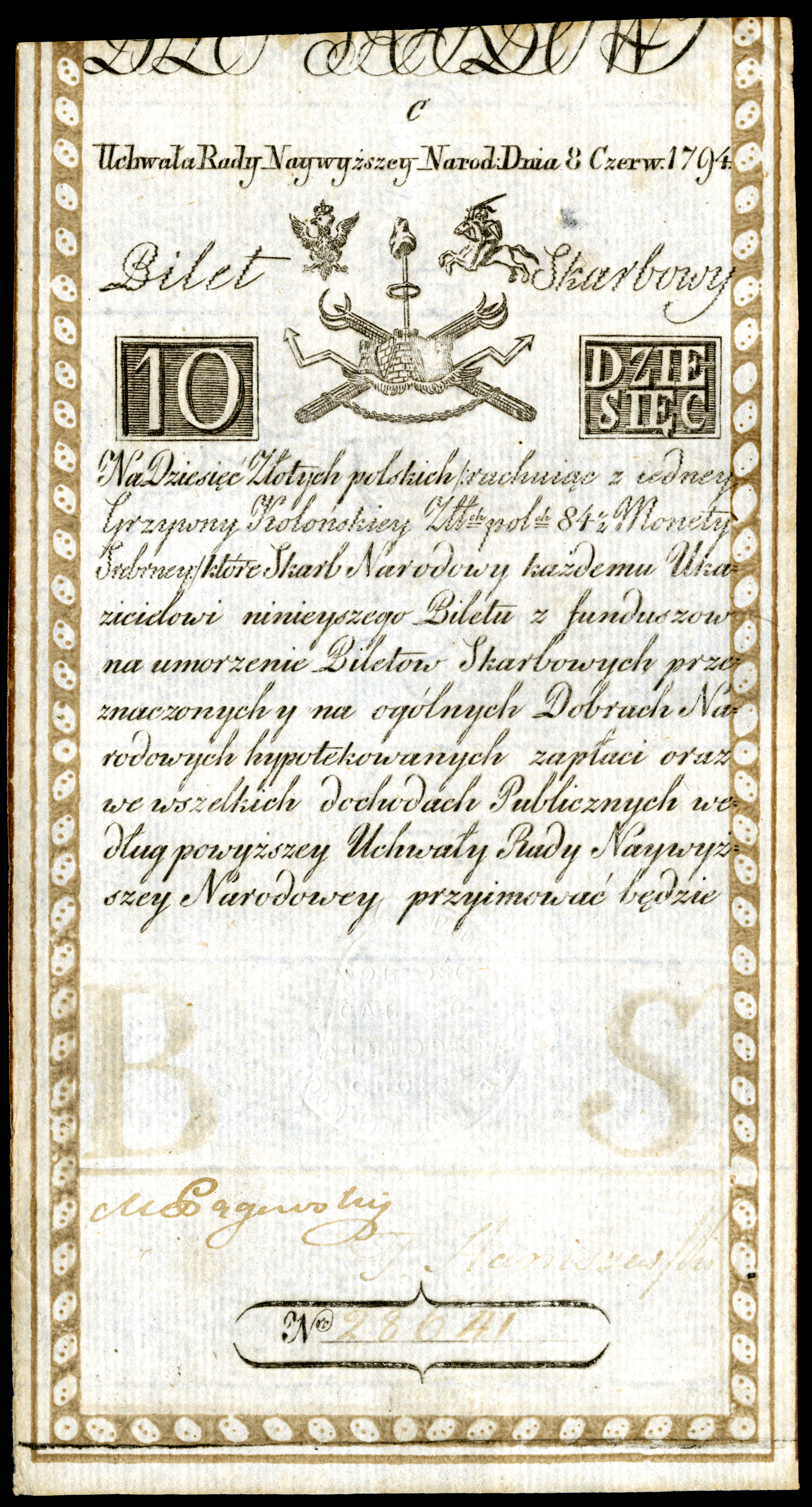
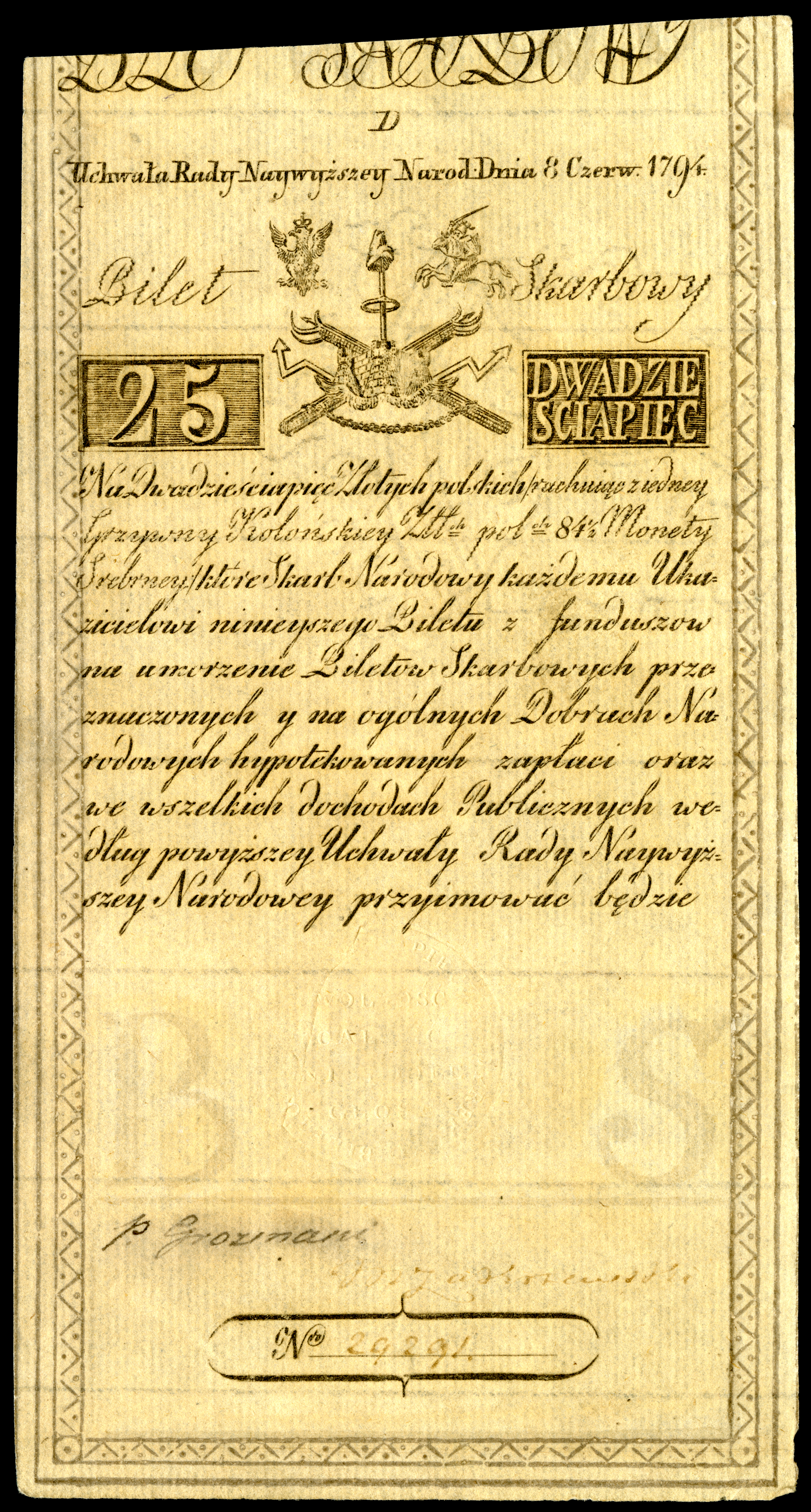
The Polish–Lithuanian Commonwealth first issued zloty banknotes in 1794 under the authority of Tadeusz Kościuszko. Above: 5-, 10- and 25-złoty notes.

By June, the Prussians had begun actively aiding the Russians, and on June 6, 1794, Kościuszko fought a defensive battle against a Prussian–Russian force at Szczekociny. From late June, for several weeks, he defended Warsaw, controlled by the insurgents. On June 28, a mob of insurgents in Warsaw captured and hanged Bishop Ignacy Massalski and six others. Kościuszko issued a public reproach, writing, "What happened in Warsaw yesterday filled my heart with bitterness and sorrow", urging, successfully for no more lynchings in the area.

By the morning of September 6, the Prussian forces having been withdrawn to suppress an uprising underway in Greater Poland, the siege of Warsaw was lifted. On October 10, during a sortie against a new Russian attack, Kościuszko was wounded and captured at Maciejowice. He was imprisoned by the Russians at Saint Petersburg in the Peter and Paul Fortress. Soon afterwards, the uprising ended with the Battle of Praga, where, according to a contemporary Russian witness, the Russian troops massacred 20,000 Warsaw residents. The subsequent Third Partition of Poland ended the existence of a sovereign Polish and Lithuanian state for the next 123 years.

== Later life ==
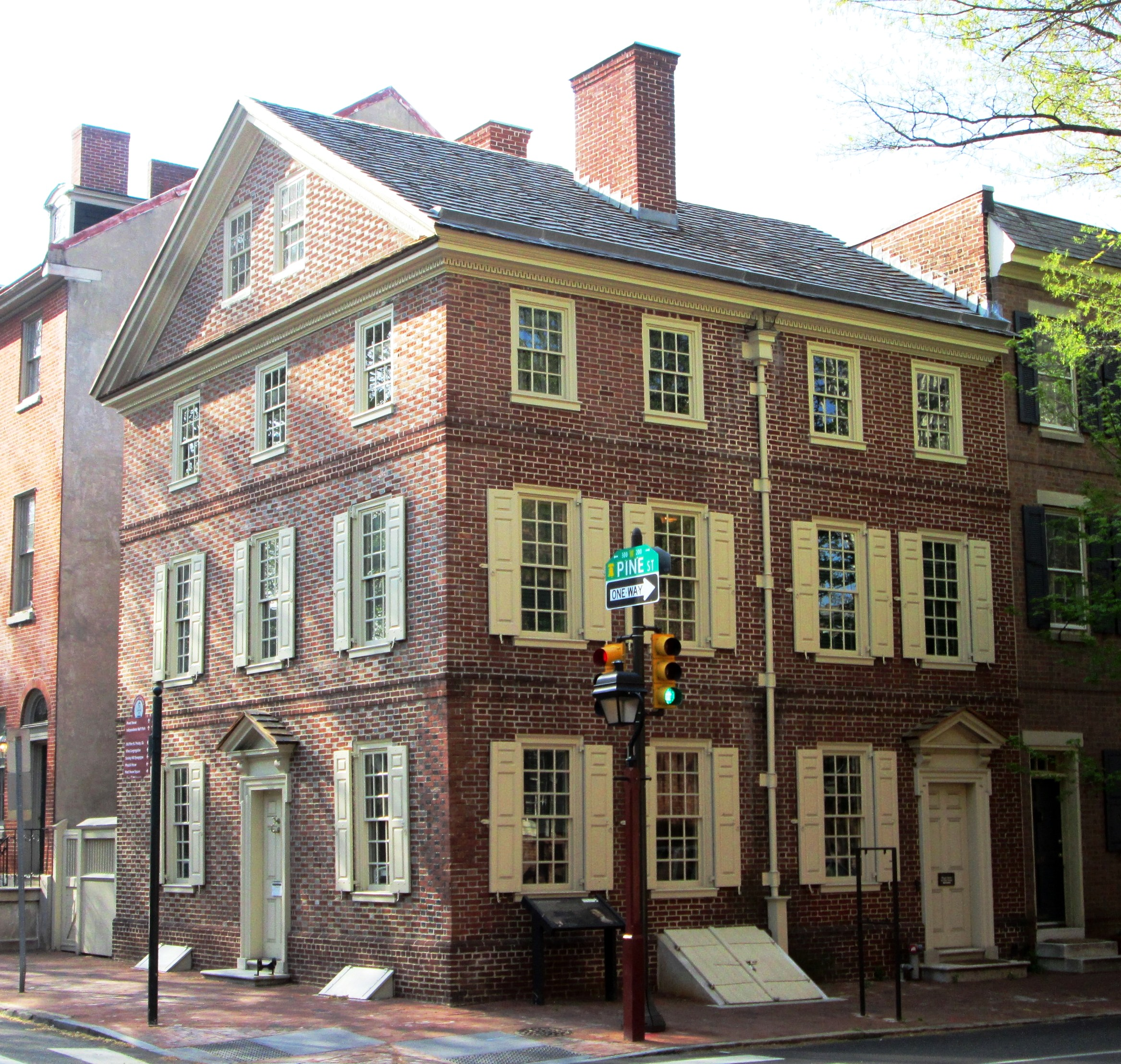
House in Philadelphia where Kościuszko stayed in 1797

The death of Tsaritsa Catherine the Great on November 17, 1796, led to a change in Russia's policies toward Poland. On November 28, Tsar Paul I, who had hated Catherine, pardoned Kościuszko and set him free after he had tendered an oath of loyalty. Paul promised to free all Polish political prisoners held in Russian prisons and those who were forcibly settled in Siberia. The Tsar gave Kościuszko 12,000 rubles, which the Pole later, in 1798, attempted to return, when also renouncing the oath.

Kościuszko left for the United States, via Stockholm, Sweden and London, departing from Bristol on June 17, 1797, and arriving in Philadelphia on August 18. Though welcomed by the populace, he was viewed with suspicion by the American government, controlled by the Federalists, who distrusted Kościuszko for his previous association with the Democratic-Republican Party.

In March 1798, Kościuszko received a bundle of letters from Europe. The news in one of them came as a shock to him, causing him, still in his wounded condition, to spring from his couch and limp unassisted to the middle of the room and exclaim to General Anthony Walton White, "I must return at once to Europe!" The letter in question contained news that Polish General Jan Henryk Dąbrowski and Polish soldiers were fighting in France under Napoleon and that Kościuszko's sister had sent his two nephews in Kościuszko's name to serve in Napoleon's ranks. Around that time, Kościuszko also received news that Talleyrand was seeking Kościuszko's moral and public endorsement for the French fight against one of Poland's partitioners, Prussia.

The call of family and country drew Kościuszko back to Europe. He immediately consulted then Vice President of the United States Thomas Jefferson, who procured a passport for him under a false name and arranged for his secret departure for France. Kościuszko left no word for either Julian Ursyn Niemcewicz, his former comrade-in-arms and fellow St. Petersburg prisoner, or for his servant, leaving only some money for them.

=== Disposition of American estate ===
Before Kościuszko left for France, he collected his back pay, wrote a will, and entrusted it to Jefferson as executor. Kościuszko and Jefferson had become close friends by 1797 and thereafter corresponded for twenty years in a spirit of mutual admiration. Jefferson wrote that "He is as pure a son of liberty as I have ever known." In the will, Kościuszko left his American estate to be sold to buy the freedom of black slaves, including Jefferson's own, and to educate them for independent life and work.

Several years after Kościuszko's death, Jefferson, aged 77, pleaded an inability to act as executor due to age and the numerous legal complexities of the bequest. It was tied up in the courts until 1856. Jefferson recommended his friend John Hartwell Cocke, who also opposed slavery, as executor, but Cocke likewise declined to execute the bequest.

The case of Kościuszko's American estate reached the U.S. Supreme Court three times. (Note: Associate Justice Joseph Story issued a decision to remand in Armstrong v. Lear, 25 U.S. 12 Wheat. 169 169 (1827), based on failure to submit the will for probate. The same estate was also the subject of Estho v Lear, 32 U.S. 130 (7 Pet. 130, 8 L.Ed. 632)(1832), in which Chief Justice John Marshall wrote a brief opinion suggesting remand, apparently to Virginia. Finally, the decision in Ennis v. Smith, 55 U.S. 14 How. 400 400 (1852) mentions no individual author; the chief justice was Roger Taney, and the only jurisdictions mentioned were those of Maryland, the District of Columbia, and Grodno.) Kościuszko had made four wills, three of which postdated the American one.

None of the money that Kościuszko had earmarked for the manumission and education of African Americans in the United States was ever used for that purpose. Though the American will was never carried out as defined, its legacy was used to found an educational institute at Newark, New Jersey, in 1826, for African Americans in the United States. It was named for Kościuszko.

=== Return to Europe ===
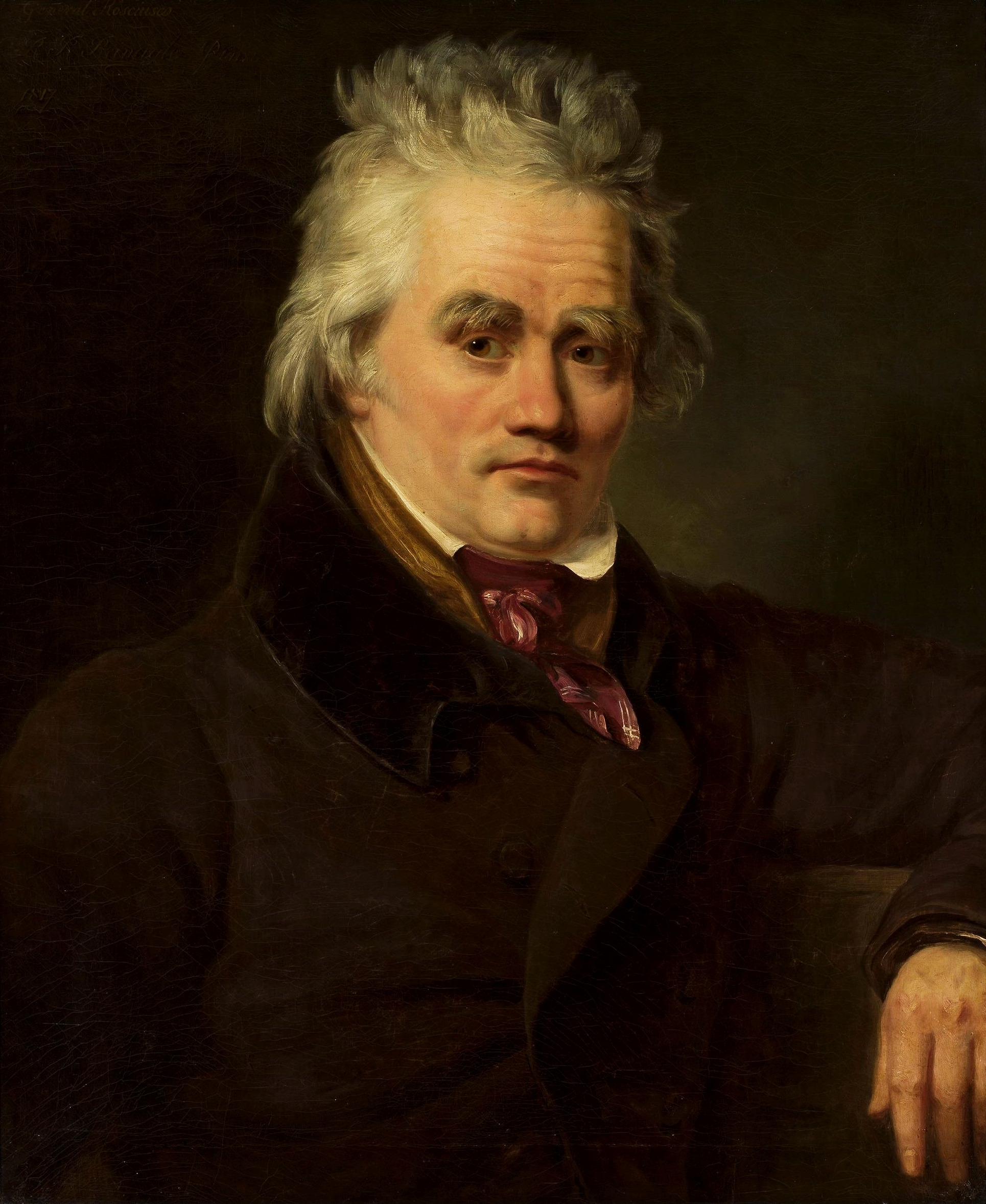
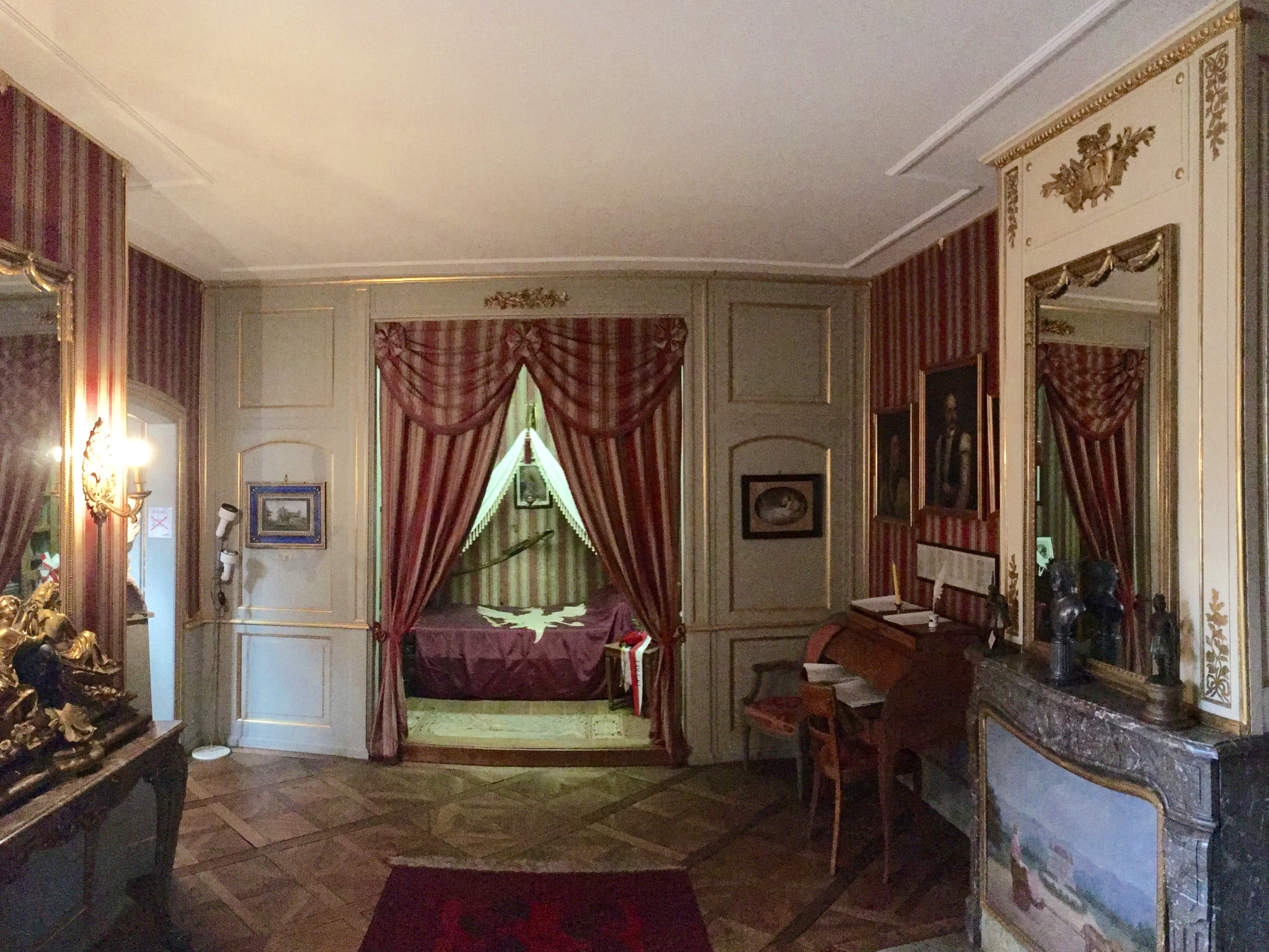
Portrait by Ramsay Richard Reinagle, 1817 (left); Kościuszko's last residence (right), in Solothurn, Switzerland, where he died the same year

Kościuszko arrived in Bayonne, France, on June 28, 1798. By that time, Talleyrand's plans had changed and no longer included him. Kościuszko remained politically active in Polish émigré circles in France, and on August 7, 1799, he joined the Society of Polish Republicans (Towarzystwo Republikanów Polskich). Kościuszko refused the offered command of Polish Legions being formed for service with France. On October 17 and November 6, 1799, he met with Napoleon Bonaparte. He failed to reach an agreement with the French general, who regarded Kościuszko as a "fool" who "overestimated his influence" in Poland. (Note: Letter from Napoleon to his Minister of Police, Joseph Fouché, 1807.) Kościuszko disliked Napoleon for his dictatorial aspirations and called him the "undertaker of the [French] Republic". In 1807, Kościuszko settled in château de Berville, near La Genevraye, distancing himself from politics.

Kościuszko did not believe that Napoleon would restore Poland in any durable form. When Napoleon's forces approached the borders of Poland, Kościuszko wrote him a letter, demanding guarantees of parliamentary democracy and substantial national borders, which Napoleon ignored. Kościuszko concluded that Napoleon had created the Duchy of Warsaw in 1807 only as an expedient, not because he supported Polish sovereignty. Consequently, Kościuszko did not move to the Duchy of Warsaw or join the new Army of the Duchy, allied with Napoleon.

After the fall of Napoleon, he met with Russia's Tsar Alexander I, in Paris and then in Braunau am Inn. The Tsar hoped that Kościuszko could be convinced to return to Poland, where the Tsar planned to create a new, Russian-allied Polish state (the Congress Kingdom). In return for his prospective services, Kościuszko demanded social reforms and restoration of territory, which he wished would reach the Dvina and Dnieper Rivers in the east. However, soon afterwards, in Vienna, Kościuszko learned that the Kingdom of Poland to be created by the Tsar would be even smaller than the earlier Duchy of Warsaw. Kościuszko called such an entity "a joke".

On April 2, 1817, Kościuszko emancipated the peasants in his remaining lands in Poland, but Tsar Alexander disallowed this. Suffering from poor health and old wounds, Kościuszko died in Solothurn at age 71 after falling from a horse, developing a fever, and suffering what resembled a stroke a few days later on October 15, 1817. However, DNA studies of Kościuszko's embalmed heart conducted in 2021 and 2022 suggested that endocarditis caused by a Cutibacterium acnes infection was a contributing factor to his death.

== Funerals ==
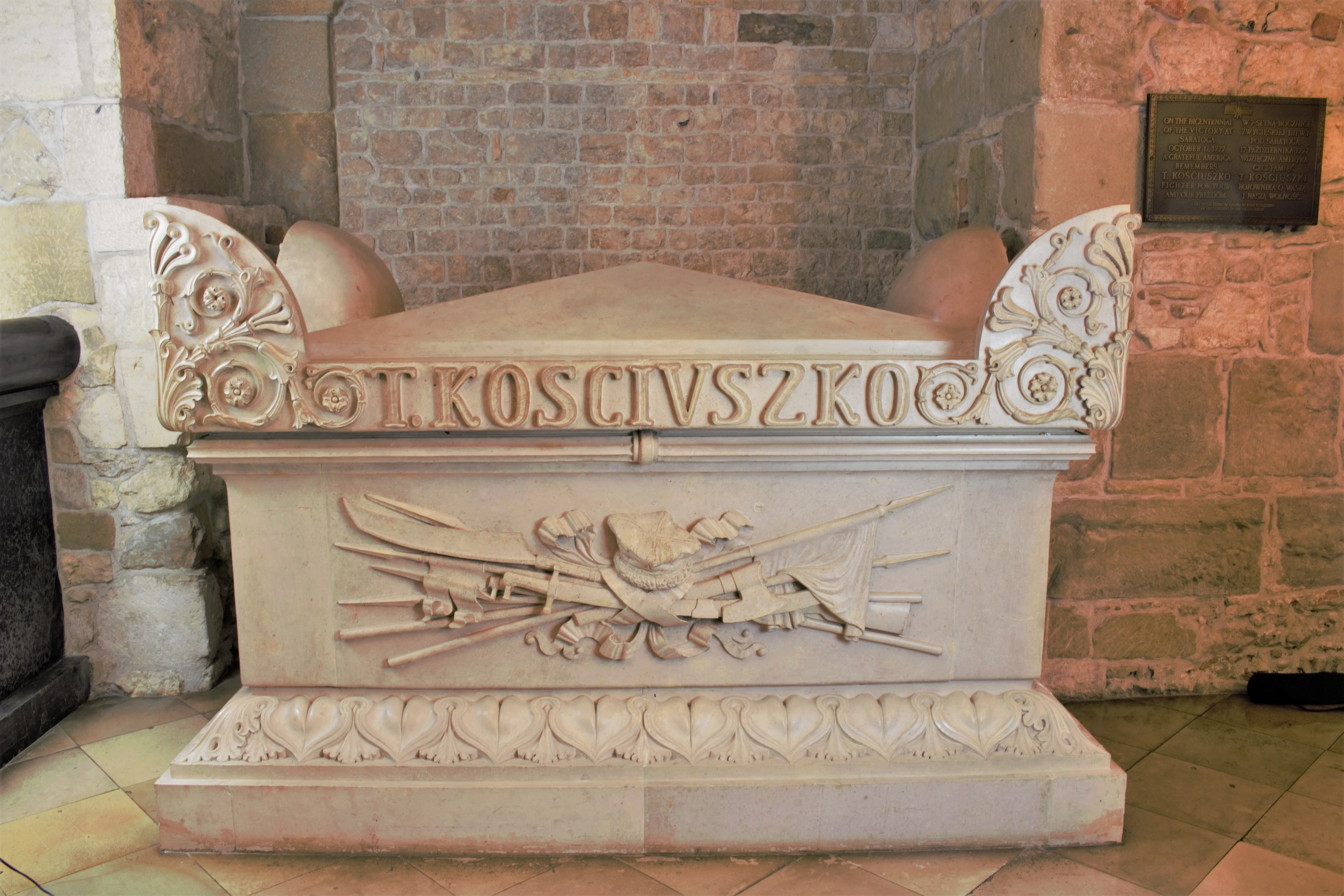
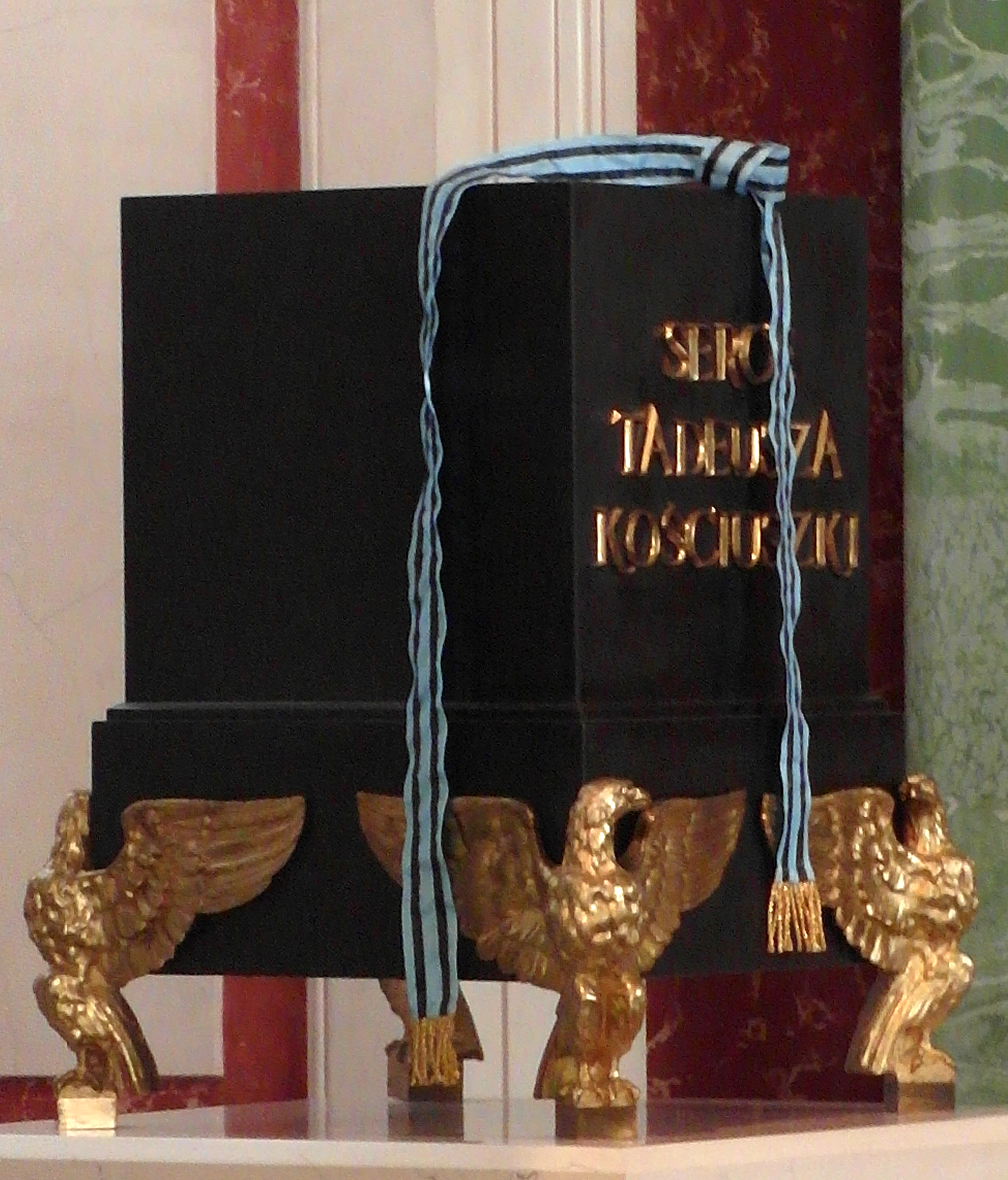
Kościuszko's sarcophagus at Wawel Cathedral (left) and his heart at Royal Castle, Warsaw (right)

Kościuszko's first funeral was held on October 19, 1817, at a formerly Jesuit church in Solothurn. As news of his death spread, Masses and memorial services were held in partitioned Poland. His embalmed body was deposited in a crypt of the Solothurn church. In 1818, Kościuszko's body was transferred to Kraków, arriving at St. Florian's Church on April 11, 1818. On June 22, 1818, or June 23, 1819 (accounts vary), to the tolling of the Sigismund Bell and the firing of cannon, his body was placed in a crypt at Wawel Cathedral, a pantheon of Polish kings and national heroes.

Kościuszko's internal organs, which had been removed during embalming, were separately interred in a graveyard at Zuchwil, near Solothurn. Kościuszko's organs remain there to this day; a large memorial stone was erected in 1820, next to a Polish memorial chapel. However, his heart was not interred with the other organs but instead kept in an urn at the Polish Museum in Rapperswil, Switzerland. The heart and the rest of the Museum's holdings were repatriated back to Warsaw in 1927, where the heart now reposes in a chapel at the Royal Castle.

== Memorials and tributes ==
He has been proclaimed and claimed as a National Hero of Poland, the United States of America, Belarus, and Lithuania.

The Polish historian Stanisław Herbst states in the 1967 Polish Biographical Dictionary that Kościuszko may be Poland's and the world's most popular Pole ever. There are monuments to him around the world, beginning with the Kościuszko Mound at Kraków, erected in 1820–23 by men, women, and children bringing earth from the battlefields where he had fought. Bridges named in his honor include the Kosciuszko Bridge built in 1939 in New York City and the Thaddeus Kosciusko Bridge completed in 1959 across the Mohawk River between Albany and Saratoga counties in upstate New York. The New York City bridge was partially replaced in April 2017 by a new bridge of the same name, with an additional bridge that opened in August 2019. A commemorative plaque dedicated to Tadeusz Kosciuszko was placed on the newly built bridge in October 2022 by the Polish foundation "Będziem Polakami" (We Will Be Poles) together with the Dobra Polska Szkoła Foundation from New York with financial support from the Polish government.

U.S. representative Thaddeus Stevens (1792–1868), one of the leaders of the Radical Republican faction of the Republican Party during the 1860s, was named in honor of his service in the American Revolutionary War.

Kościuszko's 1796 Philadelphia residence is now the Thaddeus Kosciuszko National Memorial, America's smallest national park or unit of the National Park System. There is a Kościuszko Museum at his last residence, in Solothurn, Switzerland. A Polish-American cultural agency, the Kosciuszko Foundation, headquartered in New York City, was created in 1925.

A series of Polish Air Force units have borne the name "Kościuszko Squadron". During World War II a Polish Navy ship bore his name, as did the Polish 1st Tadeusz Kościuszko Infantry Division.

One of the first examples of a historical novel, Thaddeus of Warsaw, was written in Kościuszko's honor by the Scottish author Jane Porter; it proved very popular, particularly in the United States, and went through over eighty editions in the 19th century. An opera, Kościuszko nad Sekwaną (Kościuszko at the Seine), written in the early 1820s, featured music by Franciszek Salezy Dutkiewicz and libretto by Konstanty Majeranowski. Later works have included dramas by Apollo Korzeniowski, Justyn Hoszowski and Władysław Ludwik Anczyc; three novels by Józef Ignacy Kraszewski, one by Walery Przyborowski, one by Władysław Stanisław Reymont; and works by Maria Konopnicka. Kościuszko also appears in non-Polish literature, including a sonnet by Samuel Taylor Coleridge, another by James Henry Leigh Hunt, poems by John Keats and Walter Savage Landor, and a work by Karl Eduard von Holtei.

In 1933, the U.S. Post Office issued a commemorative stamp depicting an engraving of "Brigadier General Thaddeus Kosciuszko," a statue of Kościuszko that stands in Washington, D.C.'s Lafayette Square, near the White House. The stamp was issued on the 150th anniversary of Kościuszko's naturalization as an American citizen. Poland has also issued several stamps in his honor. In 2010, a copy of the monument was unveiled in Warsaw, Poland.

In 1942, the World War II Liberty Ship SS Thaddeus Kosciuszko was named in his honor.

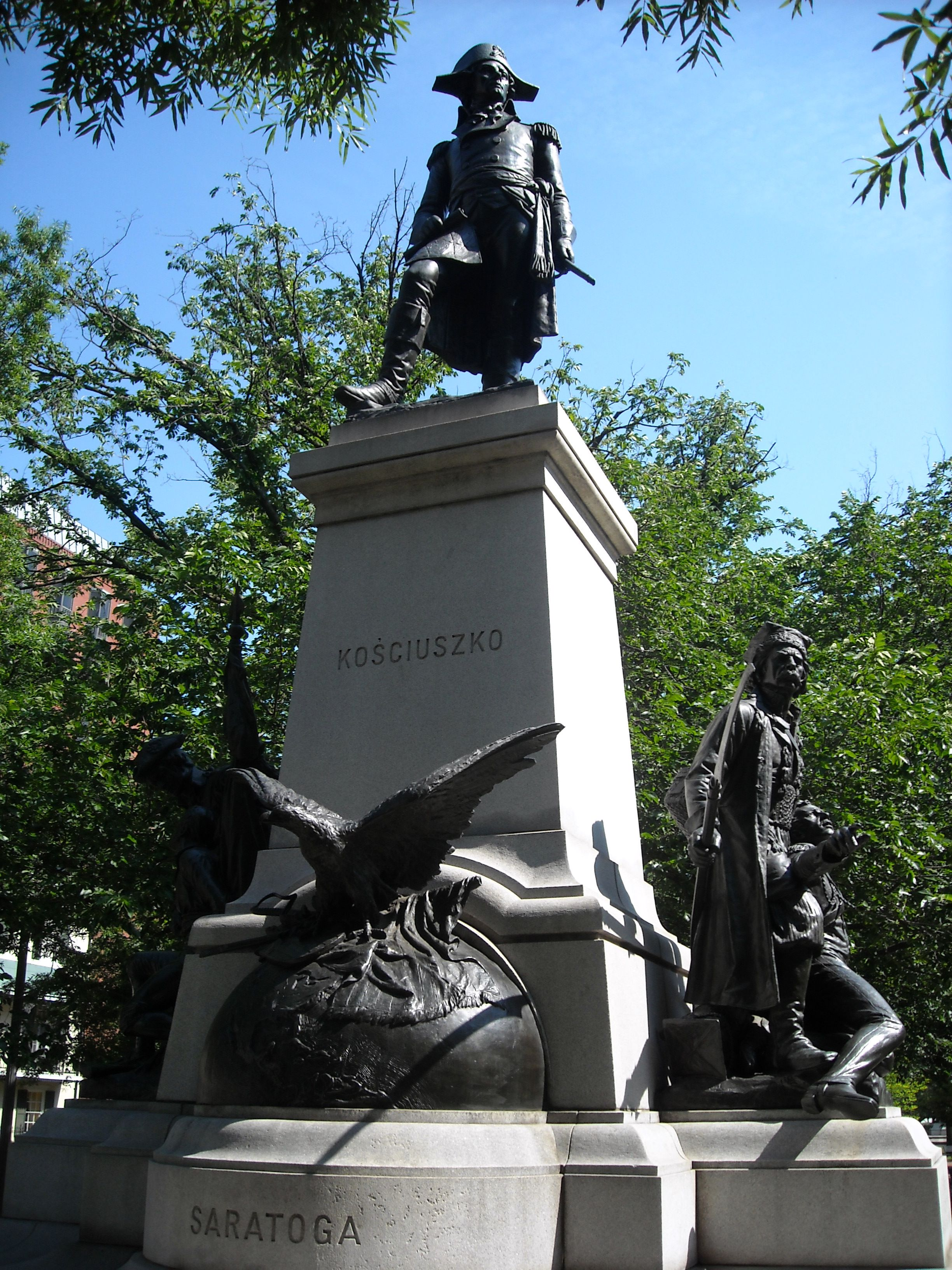
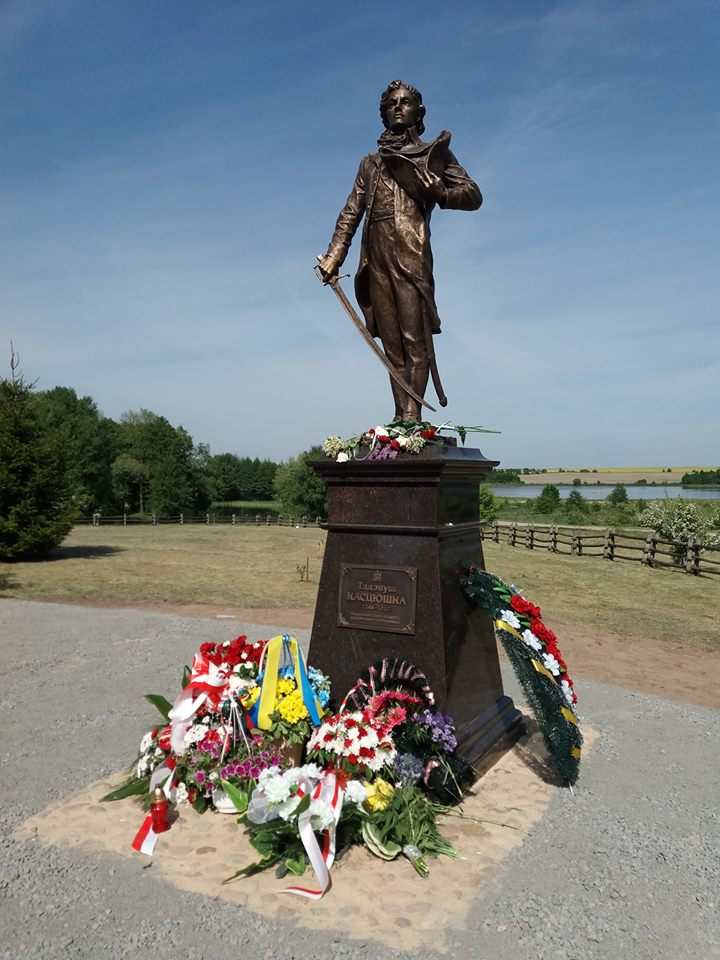
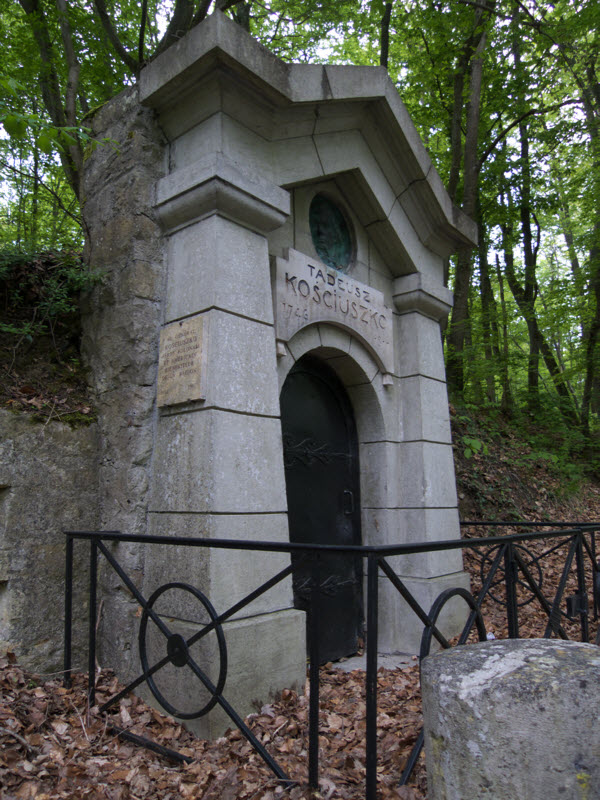
Monuments to Kosciuszko in Washington D.C. (left); Mieračoŭščyna, Belarus (center) and Montigny-sur-Loing, France (right)

There are statues of Kościuszko in Poland at Kraków (by Leonard Marconi), which was destroyed by German forces during the World War II occupation and was later replaced with a replica by Germany in 1960 and Łódź (by Mieczysław Lubelski); in the United States at Boston, West Point, Philadelphia (by Marian Konieczny), Detroit (a copy of Leonard Marconi's Kraków statue), Washington, D.C., Chicago, Milwaukee and Cleveland; and in Switzerland at Solothurn. Kościuszko has been the subject of paintings by Richard Cosway, Franciszek Smuglewicz, Michał Stachowicz, Juliusz Kossak and Jan Matejko. A monumental Racławice Panorama was painted by Jan Styka and Wojciech Kossak for the centenary of the 1794 Battle of Racławice. A commemorative monument was built in Minsk, Belarus in 2005.

In 2023, the monument at West Point was dismantled for refurbishment, and a sealed lead box of about 1 cubic foot (28 L) was discovered in the base. The time capsule is believed to date either from 1828 when it was erected by the Corp of Cadets, or 1913 when Polish clergy and laity of the United States donated a statue of Kosciuszko to sit atop the column. In June 2023, X-rays revealed that there was a box within the lead case. The opening of the box that August revealed what only appeared to be dirt but was later found to contain a medal and several coins.

Geographic features that bear his name include Mount Kosciuszko, the highest mountain in the continent of Australia. It lies in an extensive New South Wales national park also named after him, Kosciuszko National Park. Other geographic entities named after Kościuszko include Kosciusko Island in Alaska, Kosciusko County in Indiana, and numerous cities, towns, streets and parks, particularly in the United States.

Kościuszko has been the subject of many written works. The first biography of him was published in 1820 by Julian Ursyn Niemcewicz, who served beside Kościuszko as his aide-de-camp and was also imprisoned in Russia after the uprising. English-language biographies have included Monica Mary Gardner's Kościuszko: A Biography, which was first published in 1920, and a 2009 work by Alex Storozynski titled The Peasant Prince: Thaddeus Kosciuszko and the Age of Revolution.

=== Kosciuszko Commemorative Plaques ===
The Tadeusz Kosciuszko Commemorative Plaques are seven cast bronze plaques commemorating Tadeusz Kosciuszko, on the Kosciuszko Bridge over Newtown Creek in New York City. The plaques are hung on the main pillar of the bridge in the westbound direction, along the pedestrian and bicycle path. Two of the plaques, “Battle of Saratoga” and “West Point Academy”, are dedicated to Kosciuszko's most important military achievements during the American Revolution. Kosciuszko devised the successful defensive strategy for the Battle of Saratoga, which became the turning point of the American Revolution. Kosciuszko drafted plans to build West Point Fortress, suggesting to Thomas Jefferson that it be used as a West Point Military Academy. The main plaques contains the most important information about Tadeusz Kościuszko.

The creative concept for the plaques was initiated by Andrzej Cierkosz. Text for the plaques was written by Alex Storozynski. The design was created by Andrzej Cierkosz and Grzegorz Godawa and carried out by sculptor Grzegorz Godawa in Poland. They were cast in a Polish bronze foundry Brązart in Poland. The project was sponsored by Dobra Polska Szkola Foundation from New York and the Będziem Polakami Foundation from Poland. It received financial support from Andrzej Cierkosz, New York Governor Kathy Hochul and received significant financial support from the office of Polish Prime Minister Mateusz Morawiecki. The plaques were unveiled at a ceremony on October 15, 2022, the 205th anniversary of Kosciuszko’s death.

== See also ==
- Camp Kosciuszko
- Casimir Pulaski, similarly honored Polish commander in the American Revolutionary War
- Michael Kovats de Fabriczy, Hungarian commander in the American Revolutionary War, known as "the father of the American cavalry"
- Kościuszko Museum, Solothurn
- Statue of Tadeusz Kościuszko (Washington, D.C.) – a monument in Washington, D.C.

== Sources ==
- Afflerbach, Holger; Strachan, Hew (2012). How Fighting Ends: A History of Surrender. United Kingdom: Oxford University Press, 473 pages. ISBN 978-0-19-969362-7.
- Bardach, Juliusz; Leśnodorski, Bogusław; Pietrzak, Michał (1987). History of the Polish State and Law. Warsaw: Państwowe Wydawnictwo Naukowe.
- Bain, Robert Nisbet (1911). "Kosciuszko, Tadeusz Andrzej Bonawentura" . In Chisholm, Hugh (ed.). Encyclopædia Britannica. Vol. 15 (11th ed.). Cambridge University Press. pp. 914–915.
- Davies, Norman (2005). God's Playground: A History of Poland in Two Volumes. New York: Columbia University Press, Vol. 1, 616 pages; Vol. 2, 591 pages. ISBN 978-0-19-925340-1.
- Gardner, Monica Mary (1942). Kościuszko: A Biography. G. Allen & Unwin., ltd, 136 pages., Book (Google), Book (Gutenberg)
- Herbst, Stanisław (1969). "Tadeusz Kościuszko". Polski Słownik Biograficzny, 439 pages (in Polish). Vol. 14. Warsaw: Instytut Historii (Polska Akademia Nauk).
- Kite, Elizabeth S. (1918). Beaumarchais and the War of American Independence. Boston: Gorham Press, 614 pages. E'book
- Kajencki, Francis C. (1998). Thaddeus Kościuszko: Military Engineer of the American Revolution. Hedgesville: Southwest Polonia Press, 334 pages. ISBN 978-0-9627190-4-2.
- Korzon, Tadeusz (1894). Kościuszko: biografia z dokumentów wysnuta (in Polish). Nakł. Muzeum Narodowego w Rapperswylu, 819 pages.
- Landau, Zbigniew; Tomaszewski, Jerzy (1985). The Polish Economy: In the Twentieth Century. Poland: Croom Helm. ISBN 978-0-7099-1607-9.
- Lengel, Edward L. (2017). West Point History of the American Revolution. The United States Military Academy. ISBN 978-1-4767-8276-8.
- Looser, Devoney (2010). Women Writers and Old Age in Great Britain, 1750–1850. Baltimore: Johns Hopkins University Press, 252 pages. ISBN 978-1-4214-0022-8.
- Lukowski, Jerzy; Zawadzki, W. H. (2001). A Concise History of Poland. Cambridge, United Kingdom: Cambridge University Press, 317 pages. ISBN 978-0-521-55917-1.
- Makowski, Marcin Łukasz (2013). Prawdziwa twarz Tadeusza Kościuszki [The True Face of Tadeusz Kościuszko]. Gwiazda Polarna, no. 10. Spoleczenstwo i media.
- Nash, Gary; Hodges, Graham Russell Gao (2012). Friends of Liberty: A Tale of Three Patriots, Two Revolutions, and the Betrayal That Divided a Nation – Thomas Jefferson, Tadeusz Kościuszko, and Agrippa Hull. New York: Basic Books. ISBN 978-0-465-03148-1.
- Под ред, С. Каўн (2006). Вялікае княства літоўскае: гісторыя вывучэння. Мінск: Медисонт. ISBN 985-6530-29-6.
- Otrębski, Tomasz (1994). "Kościuszko", 1893–1896. Wydawn "Partner", 304 pages. ISBN 978-83-900984-0-1.
- Otrębski, Tomasz (1831). "Tadeusz Kościuszko: to jest biografia tego bohatéra : pomnożona wielu dodatkami i uwagami z historycznych źrzódeł czerpanemi przez tłumacza", 1831.
- Paulauskienė, Aušrae (2007). Lost And Found: The Discovery of Lithuania in American Fiction. Amsterdam; New York: Rodopi B.V., 173 pages. ISBN 978-90-420-2266-9.
- Palmer, Dave R. (1976). "Fortress West Point: 19th Century Concept in an 18th Century War". Military Engineer (68).
- Savas, Theodore P.; Dameron, J. David (2010). New American Revolution Handbook: Facts and Artwork for Readers of All Ages, 1775–1783. New York: Casemate Publishers, 168 pages. ISBN 978-1-932714-93-7.
- Saverchenko, Ivan; Sanko, Dmitry (1999). 150 Questions and Answers of the History of Belarus. Менск. Archived from the original on 2016-03-03.
- Stone, Daniel (2001). The Polish–Lithuanian State: 1386–1795. Seattle, Washington: University of Washington Press, 374 pages. ISBN 978-0-295-98093-5.
- Storozynski, Alex (2009). The Peasant Prince: Thaddeus Kosciuszko and the Age of Revolution. New York: St. Martin's Press, 352 pages. ISBN 978-1-4299-6607-8., Book
- —— (2011). Kosciuszko Książę chłopów. W.A.B. ISBN 978-83-7414-930-3.
- Sulkin, Sidney; Sulkin, Edith (1944). The Democratic Heritage of Poland, "For Your Freedom and Ours": An Anthology. Poland: Allen & Unwin.
- Sužiedėlis, Saulius (February 7, 2011). Historical Dictionary of Lithuania. Lanham, Maryland: Scarecrow Press, 428 pages. ISBN 978-0-8108-4914-3.
- Szyndler, Bartłomiej (1994). Powstanie kościuszkowskie 1794 (in Polish). Poland: Ancher, 455 pages. ISBN 978-83-85576-10-5.
- Szyndler, Bartłomiej (1991). Tadeusz Kościuszko, 1746–1817 (in Polish). Poland: Wydawnictwo Bellona, 487 pages. ISBN 978-83-11-07728-7.
- Witt, Michał (2022). "The hero of American and Polish nations: a molecular look at Thaddeus Kosciuszko's cause of death suggests a contribution of endocarditis caused by Cutibacterium acnes infection". Microbial Cell Factories. 21 (1) 245. Springer Nature. doi:10.1186/s12934-022-01970-7. PMC 9685984. PMID 36419091.

=== Other sources ===
- "American Philosophical Society: About". American Philosophical Society. 2019.
- "100 ВЕЛИКИХ АРИСТОКРАТОВ – Костюшко Тадеуш Андрей Бонавентура – всемирная история" [Kościuszko, Tadeusz Andrzej Bonawentura – 100 Great Aristocrats – World History] (in Belarusian). History.vn.ua.
- Alexander, Edward P. (1968). "Jefferson and Kosciuszko: Friends of Liberty and of Man". Penn State University. Archived from the original on 2013-12-16.
- Anderton, Margaret (2002). "The Spirit of the Polonaise". Polish Music Journal. 5 (2). Archived from the original on 2012-10-18.
- Anessi, Thomas. England's Future/Poland's Past: History and National Identity In Thaddeus of Warsaw (MA thesis). University of South Carolina.
- Bumblauskas, Alfredas. "Lithuania's Millennium – Millennium Lithuaniae, Or what Lithuania can tell the world on this occasion" (PDF).
- Cizauskas, Albert C. (1986). Zdanys, Jonas (ed.). "The Unusual Story of Thaddeus Kosciusko". Lithuanian Quarterly Journal of Arts and Sciences. 32 (1 – Spring). ISSN 0024-5089.
- Chodakiewicz, Marek Jan. "Tadeusz Kościuszko: A man of unwavering principle". The Institute of World Politics.
- Colimore, Edward (December 10, 2007). "Fighting to save remains of a fort". Philadelphia Inquirer, page article. Archived from the original on 2014-01-07.
- "Comprehensive Plan – Liberty in My Name" (PDF). National Park Service, 58 pages. October 4, 2007. Archived from the original (PDF) on 2009-05-14.
- Feliks, Koneczny (n.d.). "Święci w dziejach Narodu Polskiego" (in Polish). Nonpossumus.pl. Archived from the original on 2012-06-25.
- Новости (March 24, 2009). "TUTэйшыя ў свеце. Касцюшка – Общество – TUT.BY | НОВОСТИ – 24.03.2009, 13:46". News.tut.by. Archived from the original on 2012-07-26.
- Hunt, Gaillard, ed. (1922). "Tadeusz Kościuszko". Washington, D.C.: Government Printing Office.
- Jordan, Christopher, ed. (2006). "Thaddeus Kosciusko Bridge". Capital Highways. Archived from the original on 2003-04-02.
- "Kosciuszko Bridge Project". New York State Department of Transportation.
- Krol, George (July 8, 2005). "Remarks by U.S. Ambassador George Krol at the Ceremony to Unveil the Tadeusz Kościuszko Monument". Charter 97. Archived from the original on 2013-10-05.
- Levine, Bruce C. (2021). Thaddeus Stevens: Civil War Revolutionary, Fighter for Racial Justice. New York: Simon & Schuster. ISBN 978-1476793375.
- Nash, Gary; Hodges, Graham Russell Gao (2008). "Why We Should All Regret Jefferson's Broken Promise to Kościuszko". History News Network.
- Nowak, Martin S. (2007). "Julian Ursyn Niemcewicz". Polish-American Journal, essay.
- "Kościuszko Mound". Oficjalna Strona Kopca Kościuszki w Krakowie (in Polish). Kopieckosciuszki.pl.
- "Statue of General Thaddeus Kosciuszko – Third Street at Michigan Avenue in downtown Detroit". University of Michigan.
- "Tadeusz Kościuszko Gallery – Monuments". Info-poland.buffalo.edu. 2000. Archived from the original on 2014-03-04.
- "Thaddeus Kosciuszko". Thomas Jefferson Foundation.
- "Thaddeus Kosciuszko National Memorial – Thaddeus Kosciuszko National Memorial". Nps.gov.
- "The Kosciuszko Foundation: Mission and History". New York: The Kosciuszko Foundation. Archived from the original on 2014-07-12.
- Trotter, Gordon T., ed. (2007). "Kosciuszko Issue". Smithsonian National Postal Museum.
- Yiannopoulos, Athanassios N. (May 31, 1958). "Wills of Movables in American Conflicts Law: A Critique of the Domiciliary Rule". California Law Review. Archived from the original on 2013-10-04.
