= Curonian Uprising =

1794 anti-Russian revolt in Poland–Lithuania

- Part of the Kościuszko Uprising
Date	25 June 1794 – 12 August 1794
Location	Courland
Result	Russian victory

Belligerents
Poland-Lithuania	Russian Empire; Duchy of Courland and Semigallia

Commanders and leaders
Tomasz Wawrzecki; Antoni Wojtkiewicz; Ignacy Kajetan Prozor; Heinrich Ernst Johann Karl von Mirbach	Sergei Golitsyn; Fyodor Kozlyainov

Strength
3,000 soldiers	6,000 soldiers

The Curonian Uprising (Note: Latvian: Kurzemes sacelšanās; Polish: Powstanie kurlandzkie; Lithuanian: Kuršų sukilimas; Russian: Курляндское восстание, romanized: Kurlyandskoye vosstaniye; German: Kurlandaufstand) was a series of battles during the Kościuszko Uprising, fought between the Russian Empire and Polish–Lithuanian insurgents. It took place from 25 June to 12 August 1794, in the Duchy of Courland and Semigallia, and Pilten County. It ended with Russian victory, and retreat of the insurgent forces.

== Conflict ==
=== Prelude ===
The Duchy of Courland and Semigallia, led by duke Peter von Biron, remained neutral during the first and second partitions of the Polish–Lithuanian Commonwealth. Furthermore, it fell under heavy Prussian and Russian influence. On 30 May 1794, Peter von Biron had officially condemned the outbreak of the Kościuszko Uprising.

=== June ===
In June 1794, the insurrectionist Samogitian Division under the command of lieutenant general Tomasz Wawrzecki has concentrated on the Curonian border. On 2 June, Russian Empress Catherine the Great approved the request to protect the state from possible invasion by sending a contingent of 6,000 soldiers to Courland.

On 25 June, an insurgent detachment of approximately 1,500 soldiers and two cannons, under the command of major general Antoni Wojtkiewicz, took the city of Liepāja without a fight, disarming the small Curonian garrison. The capture of the city interrupted communication between Russia and Prussia. On 28 June, in Liepāja, the Polish–Lithuanian insurgents unilaterally proclaimed the act of uprising in Courland. Heinrich Ernst Johann Karl von Mirbach was declared the Major General of the Duchy of Courland, and began to create local rebel units. Universal freedom and equality were declared, and local townspeople and peasants began to join the rebels. Only the Courland Baltic German nobility were hostile to the rebels. On June 30, the Parliament of Courland officially addressed the Russian Empire and the Empress Catherine personally with a request to assume protectorate over the duchy "until order is restored in Poland."

=== July ===
Lieutenant general Sergei Golitsyn sent a military detachment of 1,100 soldiers and 8 cannons from Bauska to Liepāja under the command of lieutenant colonel Fyodor Kozlyainov, which was joined by a Curonian detachment of 200 soldiers and 2 cannons. As Russian troops approached, the rebels abandoned the city on the night of 11 July and retreated to Durbe. On 12 July, Kozlyainov took the city and imposed a tribute of 20 thousands thalers on the inhabitants.

In the skirmishes that took place in the late June in the village of Gavieze, near Liepāja, with troops commanded by the major general Ignacy Kajetan Prozor and lieutenant colonel Jan Chrzanowski, the Russian troops suffered significant losses, and Kozlainov himself was seriously wounded.

=== August ===
After general Romualdas Giedraitis' victory in the Battle of Saločiai on July 29, the troops moved towards Durbe in early August. From there, the Samogitian Division of approximately 3,000 soldiers headed through Gavieze, to Liepāja, capturing the city after the battles on 7 and 8 August. They were supported by lieutenant colonel Jan Poniatowski's detachment, which attacked it from the south. Wawrzecki left a garrison in the city and set out in pursuit of Kozlyainov's retreating forces, which were retreating towards Jelgava. After the retreat of the Russian troops, the rebels captured the entire western part of Courland up to the Venta river. One of their detachments captured the port city of Ventspils.

The rebel forces retargeted from Liepāja, following Russia capturing Vilnius on 12 August, fearing of being cut off from the supply lines in Lithuania. They left Courland, traveling through Grodno to Warsaw, where they took part in the battle of Praga, ultimately being defeated, ending the Kościuszko Uprising.

== Aftermath ==
Following the end of the uprising, the territory of the Duchy of Courland and Semigallia was incorporated into the Russian Empire on 28 March 1795, as part of the Third Partition of Poland. As punishment for their rebellion, many of Curonian insurgents were forcibly resettled to Siberia. They were freed in 1797, with a pardon issued by Emperor Paul I. Heinrich Ernst Johann Karl von Mirbach, was arrested and sent to Riga, where he was put on trial for inciting a rebellion of the Curonian peasants. While sentenced to death, he was spared by Empress Catherine the Great, and was instead deported to Siberia.
