= Lithuanian separatism =

Lithuanian raison d'état, also called Lithuanian particularism (Polish: litewski partikularyzm) and Lithuanian separatism (Lithuanian: lietuvių separatizmas; Polish: litewski separatyzm), was a major force throughout Lithuanian history with regard to Lithuanian and Polish relations, showing itself in Lithuanian efforts to maintain Lithuania's political, legal, cultural, and military distinctiveness from Poland from the Late Middle Ages to the interwar period. As the Polish historian Tomasz Ambroziak noted, the terms are not precisely defined, although the concept has been repeatedly addressed in academic works. The terms "Lithuanian separatism" and "Lithuanian particularism" have a long term interchangeable usage in historiography.

Throughout all of these centuries, the close relations did not mean the complete erasure of Lithuanian distinctiveness, but instead saw the Lithuanian raison d'état repeatedly reassert itself. Frequently, it was a defensive reaction to recurrent Polish attempts to completely incorporate Lithuania into Poland.

== In the Grand Duchy of Lithuania ==
The Grand Duchy of Lithuania had close relations with the Kingdom of Poland since 1385. Despite this, the Lithuanians frequently manoeuvred for more political room with regard to Poland by maintaining a separate office of the Grand Duke of Lithuania, the Sejm, the Lithuanian Council of Lords, and other institutions.

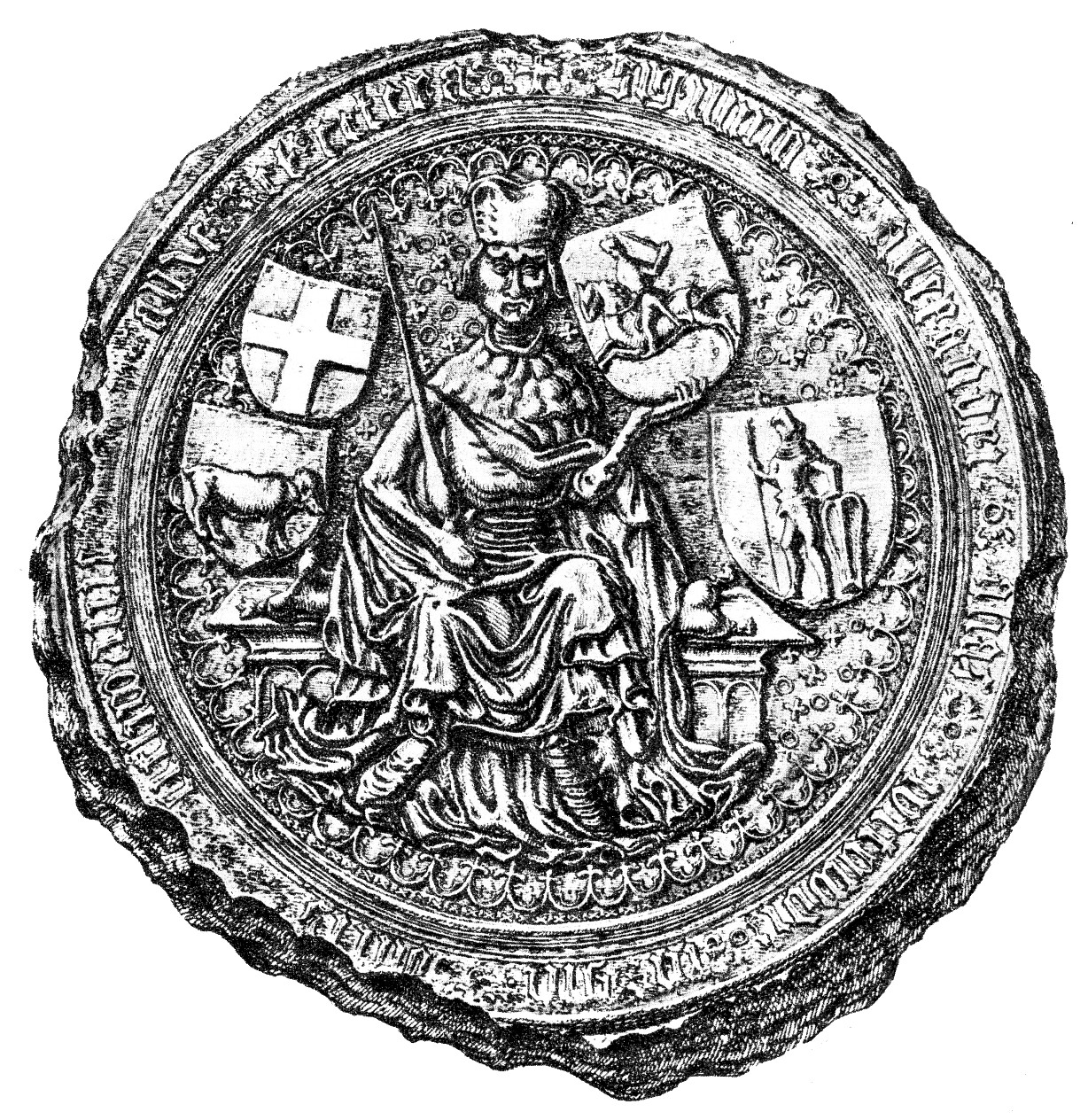
Vytautas the Great (pictured) and his supporters Lithuanian nobles political and military efforts strengthened the statehood of the Grand Duchy of Lithuania, preserved separate monarchial institution of the Grand Duke of Lithuania and management organization of the Grand Duchy of Lithuania

The Lithuanian nobles rejected Lithuanian Grand Duchess Uliana of Tver 1383 project to Christianize Lithuanians as Eastern Orthodox and instead Lithuanian monarch Jogaila, along with other Gediminids, on 14 August 1385 in the Kreva Castle agreed to conclude the Union of Krewo, according to which Jogaila married Polish monarch Jadwiga and was crowned as Polish King Władysław II, while the Lithuanian and Ruthenian territories of the Grand Duchy of Lithuania were attached (applicare) to the Crown of the Kingdom of Poland and Poland's suzerainty over Lithuania was set. The Union of Krewo laid the foundations for the Polish nobles to request termination of Lithuania's statehood and complete integration of Lithuania to Poland. Nevertheless, soon the Lithuanian Civil War (1389–1392), a sequel to the Lithuanian Civil War (1381–1384), occurred as a struggle for power in the Grand Duchy of Lithuania between the cousins Władysław II Jagiełło and Vytautas the Great, a defender of the statehood of the Grand Duchy of Lithuania which drawn support for him of a part of Lithuanian nobles. The 1381–1384 Lithuanian Civil War ceased with the Ostrów Agreement, signed on 4 August 1392, according to which Vytautas the Great regained control of the Duchy of Trakai, other lands of his father Kęstutis, and was granted the right to rule Vilnius, the capital city of the Grand Duchy of Lithuania, as regent and vassal of the King of Poland and Grand Duke of Lithuania Władysław II Jagiełło, however Vytautas the Great soon began consolidating his reign as de facto Grand Duke of Lithuania, not as regent.

In the late 14th century a set of three acts were passed in Vilnius, Grand Duchy of Lithuania, and they were confirmed by the Polish Crown Council in Radom, Kingdom of Poland in 1401 (see: Pact of Vilnius and Radom), according to which the Kingdom of Poland legally confirmed the sovereignty of the Grand Duchy of Lithuania and recognized Vytautas the Great as the Grand Duke of Lithuania (magnus dux) until his death, but henceforth Władysław II Jagiełło held a higher monarchial title Supreme Duke of Lithuania (supremus dux).

On 2 October 1413 in the Polish town Horodło the Union of Horodło was concluded where the first act was signed by Władysław II Jagiełło, King of Poland, and Vytautas the Great, Grand Duke of Lithuania, the second and third acts were composed by the Polish nobility (szlachta) and Lithuanian nobility boyars, respectively, which amended the earlier Polish–Lithuanian unions of Krewo and Vilnius–Radom, politically Lithuania received more autonomy as, after the death of Vytautas the Great, the Lithuanian nobles were permitted to choose another Grand Duke of Lithuania instead of passing this title to Władysław II Jagiełło or his heir, and prevented the Polish nobles aspirations to incorporate the Grand Duchy of Lithuania into the Kingdom of Poland. However, the Union of Horodło intensified the Polonisation of the Grand Duchy of Lithuania as it adopted the Polish institutions (castellans and voivodes) and forty-seven selected Lithuanian nobles were adopted by Polish families and granted Polish coats of arms. Moreover, the Lithuanian nobles promised to the Polish nobles to maintain the Polish–Lithuanian Union and after the death of Vytautas the Great to elect the new Grand Duke of Lithuania only with agreements of the King of Poland and Polish nobles, which meant the King of Poland and Polish nobles suzerainty over Lithuanian nobles and Grand Duchy of Lithuania, but Lithuanian nobles were permitted to participate in the royal elections in Poland.

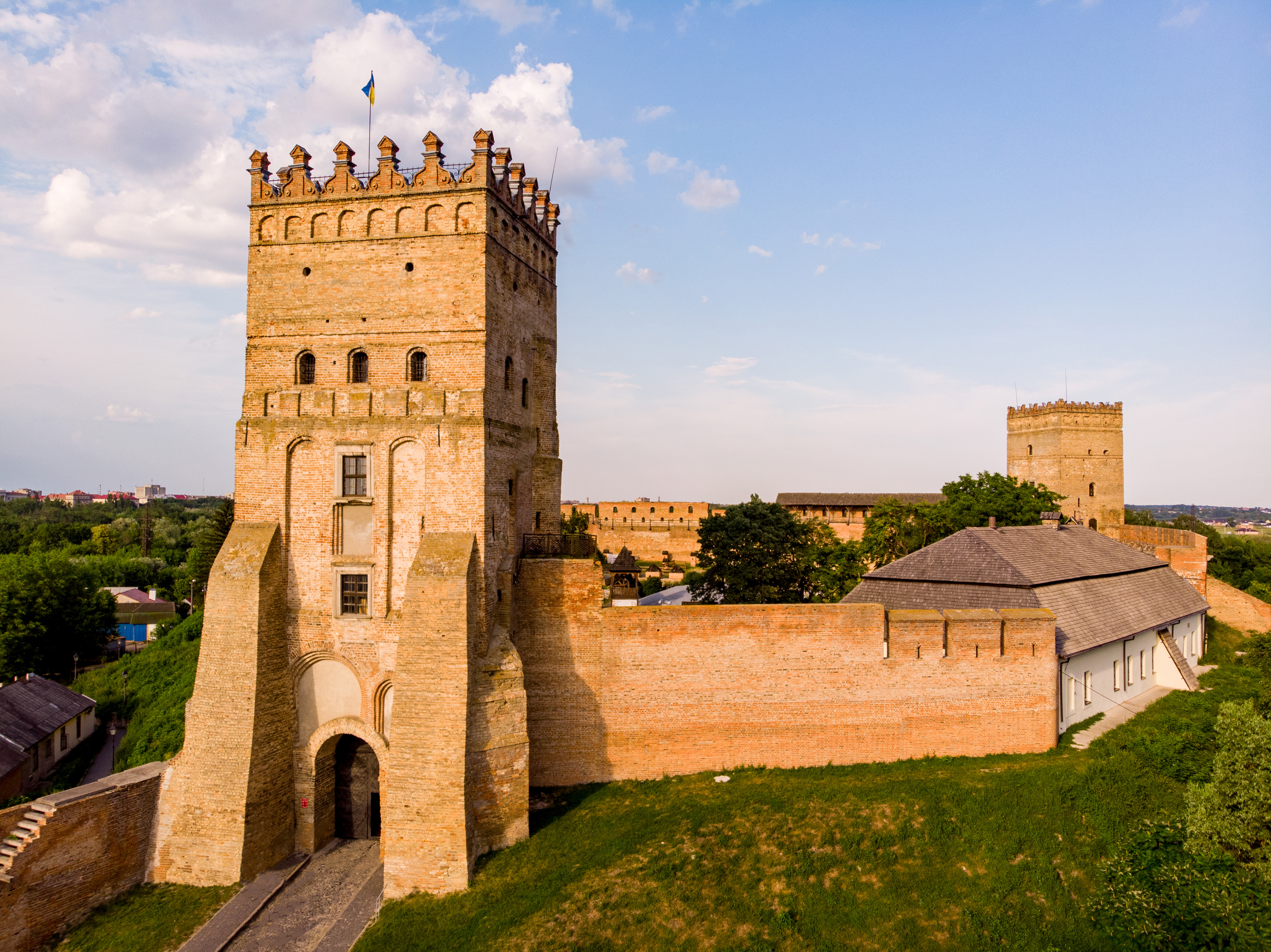
Lubart's Castle in Lutsk, where the Congress of Lutsk was held in 1429

The political and military efforts of Lithuanian Grand Duke Vytautas the Great and his supporters Lithuanian nobles secured a separate monarchial institution of the Grand Duke of Lithuania and separate management organization of the Grand Duchy of Lithuania. Since 6 January 1429 the 13-week period Congress of Lutsk was held in the Lubart's Castle in Lutsk, Grand Duchy of Lithuania where Vytautas the Great was offered to be coronated as the King of Lithuania and this way restore the Kingdom of Lithuania. The royal coronation of Vytautas the Great was suggested by Sigismund, Holy Roman Emperor, as a result of Lithuanian nobles diplomatic efforts following the 1398 Treaty of Salynas and initially during the Congress of Lutsk was also supported by Polish King and Supreme Lithuanian Duke Władysław II Jagiełło, however it was opposed by Polish nobles, Polish Royal Secretary Zbigniew Oleśnicki and eventually pressurred by them Władysław II Jagiełło cancelled his initial approval for the royal coronation of Vytautas the Great. Vytautas the Great sought the royal coronation as the King of Lithuania in the Vilnius Cathedral to strengthen the sovereignty of the Grand Duchy of Lithuania and to dismiss the Polish nobles aspirations to incorporate the Grand Duchy of Lithuania into the Crown of the Kingdom of Poland, however Vytautas the Great died on 27 October 1430 before his royal crown arrived to the Grand Duchy of Lithuania.

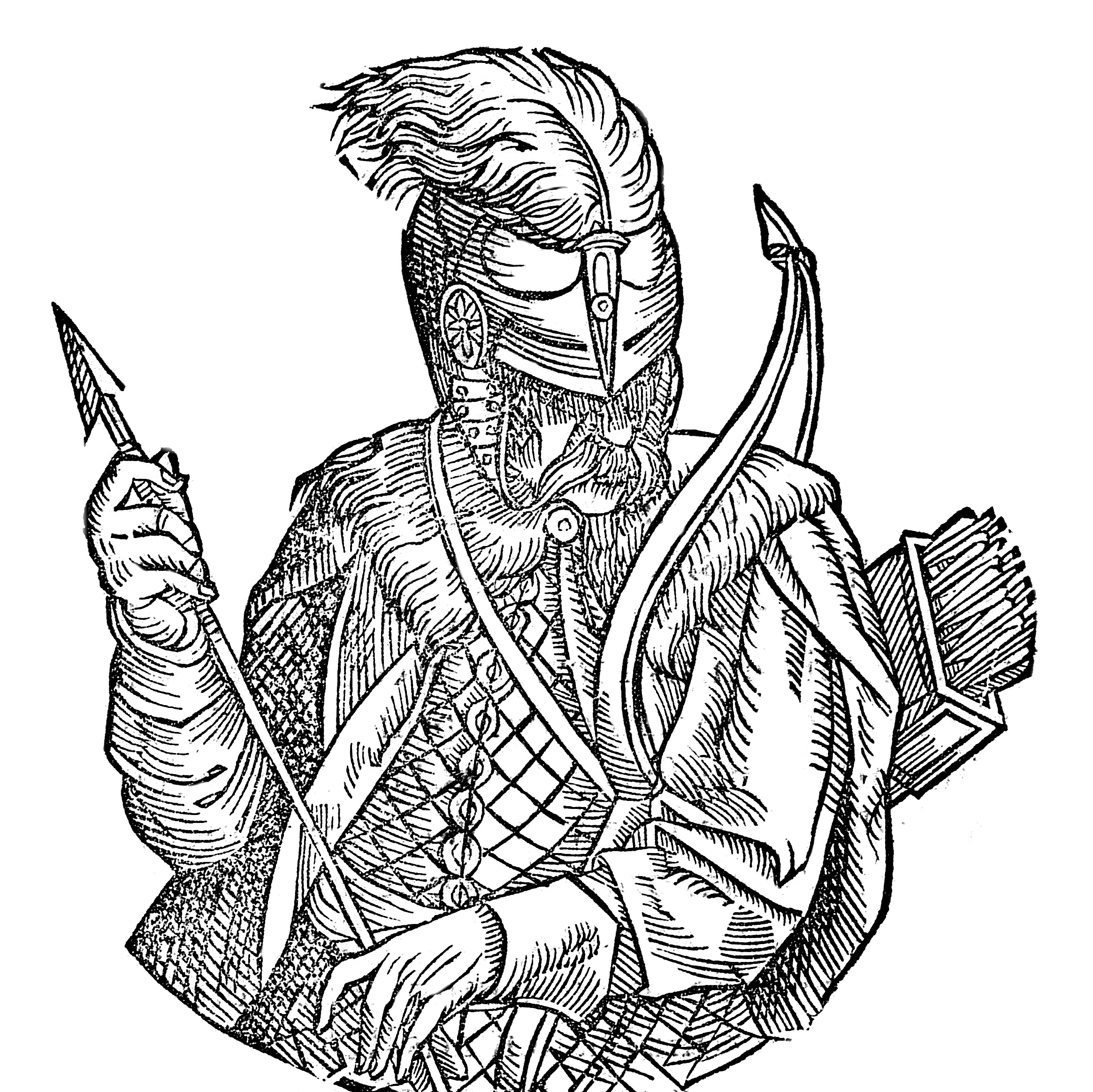
Grand Duke Švitrigaila sought to continue Vytautas the Great aspirations for a Lithuanian royal crown and restoration of the sovereign Kingdom of Lithuania

The Lithuanian nobles selected Švitrigaila as the new Grand Duke of Lithuania and he continued Vytautas the Great policies as he defended the sovereignty of the Grand Duchy of Lithuania and sought to be crowned as the King of Lithuania, however his poor relationships with the Polish nobles, Władysław II Jagiełło and lost two decisive battles (Battle of Ashmyany in 1432 and Battle of Wiłkomierz in 1435) resulted in his overthrow as the Grand Duke of Lithuania by Vytautas the Great brother Sigismund Kęstutaitis and his supporters. Sigismund Kęstutaitis initially supported Švitrigaila's struggle with Poland, but after the coup d'état against Švitrigaila (supported by Poland and a part of Lithuanians) and becoming the new Grand Duke of Lithuania he concluded the Union of Grodno (1432), according to which he ruled the Grand Duchy of Lithuania as regent of Władysław II Jagiełło and promised not to seek the Lithuanian royal crown for himself and his son Michael Žygimantaitis. Nevertheless, Sigismund Kęstutaitis in 1438–1439 sought to form an anti-Polish coalition with Albert II of Germany by seeking to annul his earlier agreements with Poland, but was assassinated in 1440.

In 1440, Casimir IV Jagiellon was sent by his older brother King of Poland and Hungary, Supreme Duke of Lithuania Władysław III to the Grand Duchy of Lithuania to rule in his name. But instead he was elected by the Lithuanian nobles as the Grand Duke of Lithuania upon his arrival to Vilnius on June 29, 1440, with the ringing of church bells and the singing of the Te Deum laudamus. This was breaching the agreements of the Union of Grodno (1432) and terminating the Polish–Lithuanian union. It manifested Lithuania as a sovereign state and its ruler Casimir IV Jagiellon stressed himself as a "free lord" (pan – dominus). According to historian Edvardas Gudavičius, Bishop of Vilnius put a Gediminas's Cap in the Vilnius Cathedral on his head, despite the Polish nobility's opposition. Following the death of Władysław III in the Battle of Varna (1444), Lithuanian Grand Duke Casimir IV Jagiellon, as requested by Lithuanian nobles, agreed to the Polish nobles offer to also become the King of Poland by only forming an alliance of two equal rights countries and concluding a personal union.

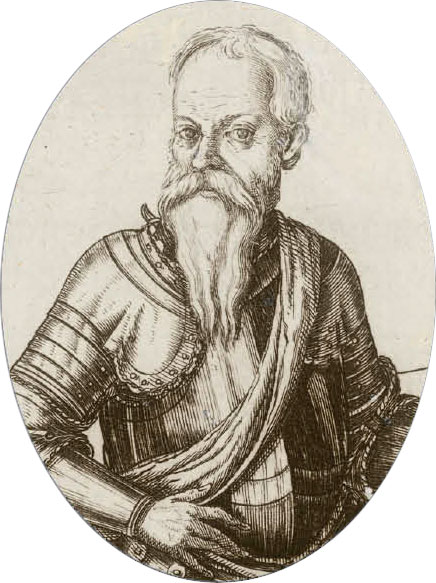
Lithuanian Grand Chancellor Mikołaj Radziwiłł the Red, who refused to further participate in the Polish–Lithuanian Union negotiations when the Polish nobles raised demands of Lithuania's incorporation into Poland per union in 1569

The Lithuania–Poland relations only grew closer when both states joined the Polish–Lithuanian Commonwealth in 1569. In 1563–1564, Lithuanian Grand Marshal Mikołaj Radziwiłł the Black, known for resolutely defending the sovereignty and territorial integrity of the Grand Duchy of Lithuania, led Lithuanian delegation which travelled to the Sejm of the Kingdom of Poland in Warsaw due to Lithuanian military failures in the Livonian War and accepted to conclude only a limited union of Lithuania and Poland without the unification of the two countries into one country, but it was not concluded and Mikołaj Radziwiłł the Black died on 28 May 1565. While further negotiating the closer Polish–Lithuanian Union during the Sejm held in Lublin since 10 January 1569 the highest Lithuanian delegation officials, including the head of delegation Lithuanian Grand Chancellor Mikołaj Radziwiłł the Red, Lithuanian Vice-Chancellor Eustachy Wołłowicz, Samogitian Elder Jan Hieronimowicz Chodkiewicz, Kievan Voivode Konstanty Wasyl Ostrogski, sought to maintain the statehood of the Grand Duchy of Lithuania, demanded for a separate Lithuanian parliament, separate proclamation in Vilnius of the Grand Duke of Lithuania and that joint Polish–Lithuanian parliament sessions be held alternately in Lithuania and Poland, while the Polish senators and members of parliament treated earlier Polish–Lithuanian Union acts as Lithuania's incorporation into Poland and demanded to conclude the Polish–Lithuanian Union as such. As monarch Sigismund II Augustus demonstrated support for the Polish nobles demands and transferred a part of the Grand Duchy of Lithuania territories to the Crown of the Kingdom of Poland (Kiev Voivodeship, Podolian Voivodeship, Bracław Voivodeship, Volhynian Voivodeship, Podlaskie Voivodeship), the head of the Lithuanian delegation Mikołaj Radziwiłł the Red refused to further participate in the Polish–Lithuanian Union negotiations and he was replaced by Jan Hieronimowicz Chodkiewicz as the head of the Lithuanian delegation. Since 6 June 1569 during further negotiations of the Polish–Lithuanian Union in Lublin, Polish nobles formally agreed that the Grand Duchy of Lithuania would be treated as equal with the Crown of the Kingdom of Poland and the Lithuanian delegation eventually agreed to a closer Polish–Lithuanian Union, which was adopted by monarch Sigismund II Augustus and, thanks to the diplomatic efforts of Chodkiewicz, preserved a separate Grand Duchy of Lithuania territory, monarchial title (Grand Duke of Lithuania), seal, administration, laws, courts, treasury, army. Nevertheless, Mikołaj Radziwiłł the Red refused to sign the 1569 Union of Lublin, viewed it as the funeral and eternal destruction of a free and independent state of the Grand Duchy of Lithuania, and following the death of monarch Sigismund II Augustus sought to decrease the consequences of the 1569 Union of Lublin. According to Lithuanian historian Saulius Sužiedėlis, the Lithuanians resistance to the Union of Lublin was an early modern times example of Lithuanians emphasis of a separate Lithuanian national identity and consciousness.

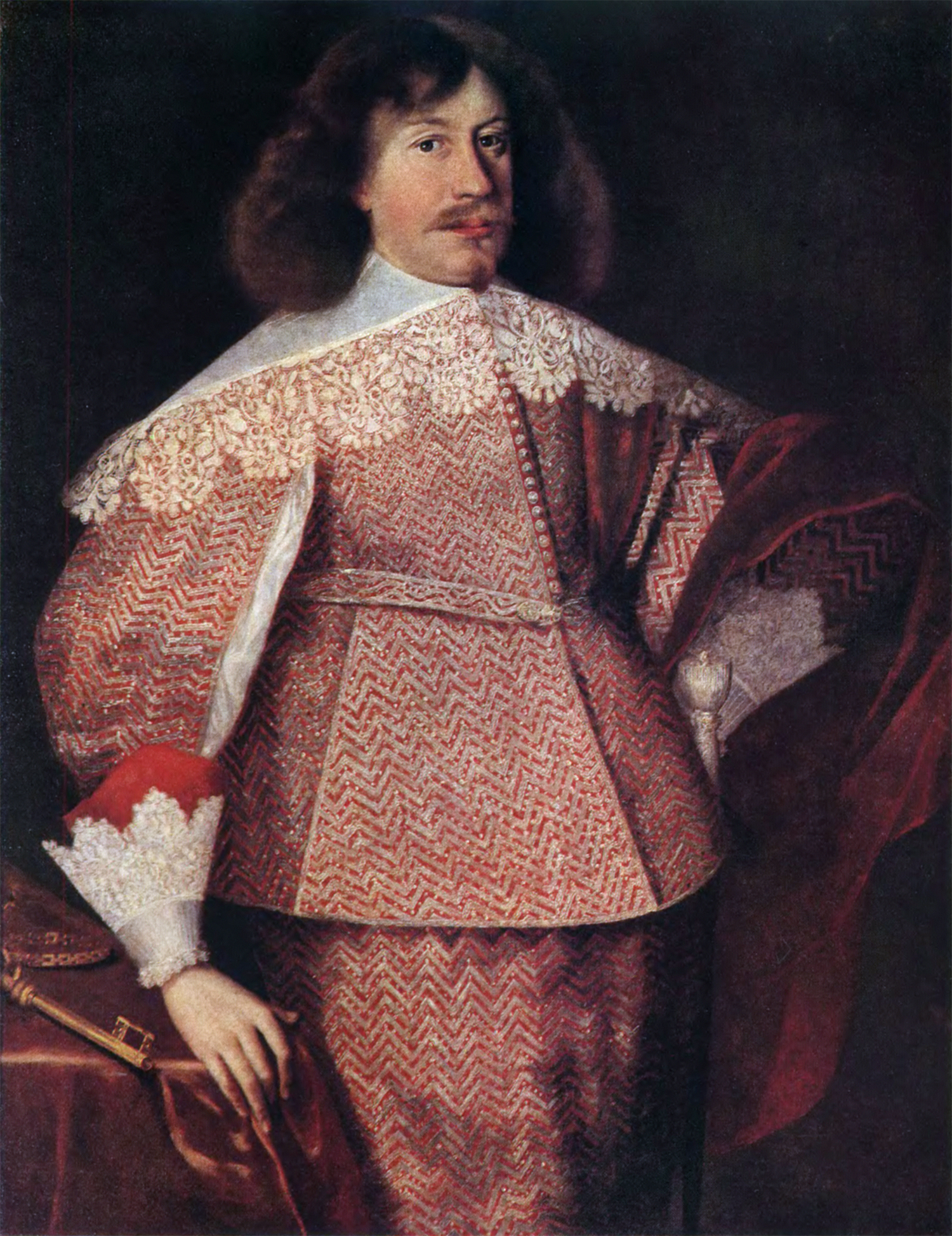
Prince Janusz Radziwiłł, one of the main initiators of the 1655 Swedish–Lithuanian Union

Within the Commonwealth, the Lithuanian raison d'état inspired the Lithuanian nobility to maintain their own state offices, administration, army, treasury, and courts. The legal system of Lithuania, through the Statutes of Lithuania and the Lithuanian Tribunal, was also a marker of Lithuanian separateness from Poland. On 28 January 1588, Polish–Lithuanian Commonwealth monarch Sigismund III Vasa confirmed the Third Statute of Lithuania, prepared by the Lithuanian Vice-Chancellor Lew Sapieha, which stated that the Polish–Lithuanian Commonwealth is a federation of two countries – Crown of the Kingdom of Poland and the Grand Duchy of Lithuania where both countries have equal rights within it. Furthermore, a notable example of Lithuanian raison d'état was the Union of Kėdainiai in 1655, guided by the Prince Janusz Radziwiłł, when the Polish–Lithuanian union broke down and the brief Swedish–Lithuanian union was created.

Still, an enduring sense of Lithuanian distinctness did not stop the widespread cultural (but not yet political) Polonization of the Lithuanian nobility. For example, among the Reformed Lithuanian Unity, the liturgical language was Polish, but Fatherland (patria) referred to the Grand Duchy of Lithuania and their attempts to maintain separate rites were seen as Lithuanian separatism. However, some Polish historians claim that the existence of Lithuanian separateness is overstated.

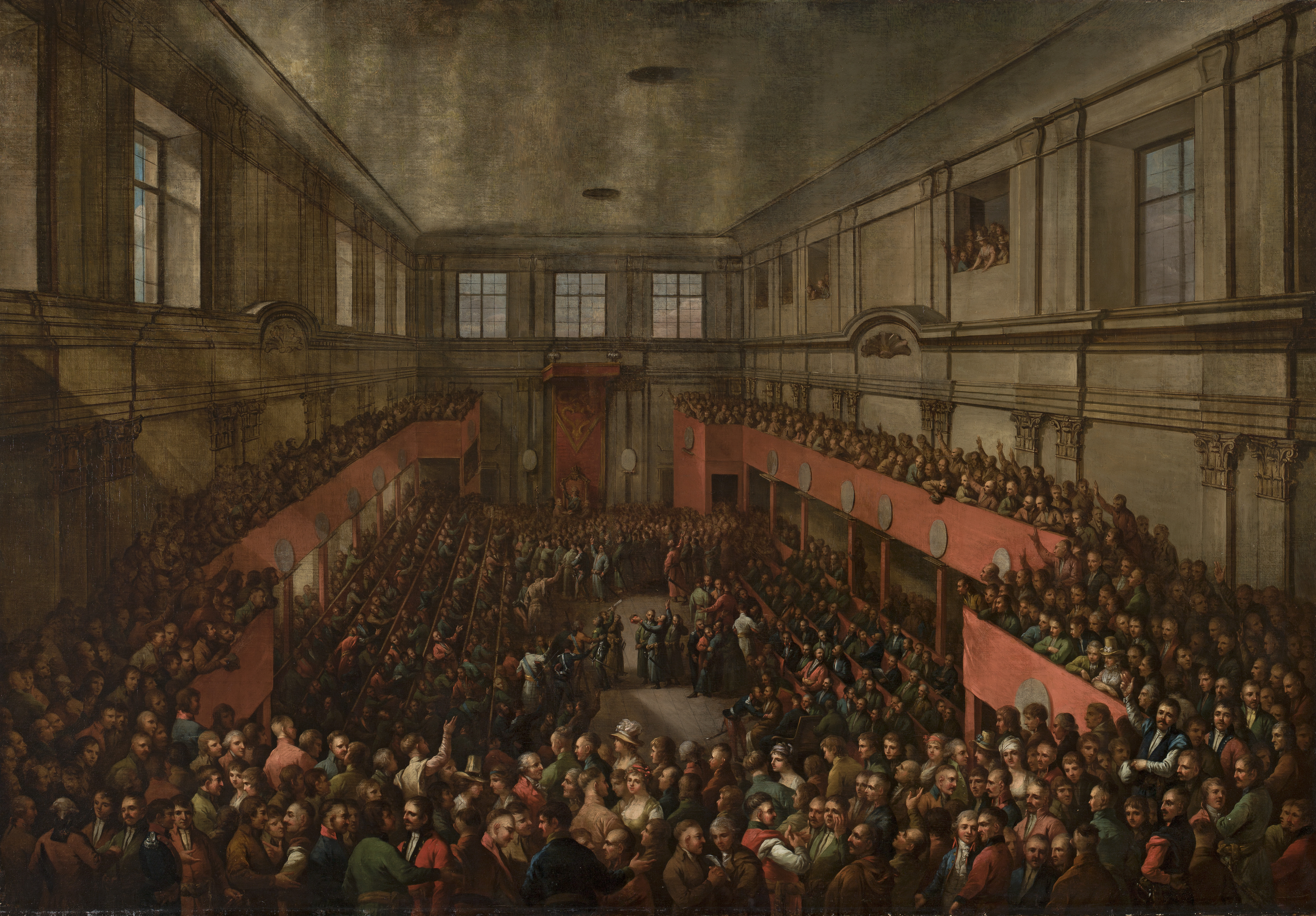
During the 1788–1792 Great Sejm in Warsaw (pictured) the majority of deputies of the Grand Duchy of Lithuania opposed the Polish deputies aspirations to abolish the separateness of the Grand Duchy of Lithuania and this resulted in adoption of the Reciprocal Guarantee of Two Nations

On 3 May 1791, the Great Sejm in Warsaw adopted the Constitution of 3 May 1791, which transformed the Polish–Lithuanian Commonwealth (Republic of Two Nations) into a unitary monarchy state called Rzeczpospolita Polska and in the Constitution the Grand Duchy of Lithuania was not mentioned as constituent part of the Rzeczpospolita Polska. The advocates of the draft of the Constitution in a hurry began the debate on the Constitution two days early, while many opposing deputies were away on Easter recess, thus on 3 May 1791 the Sejm convened with only 182 members, about half its "dual" number. During the Great Sejm the majority of deputies of the Grand Duchy of Lithuania opposed the Polish deputies aspirations to abolish the separateness of the Grand Duchy of Lithuania and the majority of Lithuanian deputies supported the adoption of the Constituon on a compromise that more sovereignty and rights will be granted to the Grand Duchy of Lithuania in the unitary state. Consequently, later on 20 October 1791 the Reciprocal Guarantee of Two Nations, an addendum to the Constitution, was adopted unanimously by the Great Sejm and was signed by monarch Stanisław August Poniatowski which confirmed duality of the Republic of Two Nations. The Reciprocal Guarantee of Two Nations emphasized different status of the Grand Duchy of Lithuania in the state, compared to the Greater Poland and Lesser Poland, and the Grand Duchy of Lithuania gained the right to separate courts, treasury and equal representation with the Crown of the Kingdom of Poland in the most important state central institutions as half of their members had to be of the Grand Duchy of Lithuania. In November 1793, the Grodno Sejm formally abolished the Constitution of 3 May 1791 and it was the last convening Sejm of the Polish–Lithuanian Commonwealth.

In the Kościuszko Uprising, controversy arose regarding the organization of the Lithuanian insurgents. The first insurgents in Lithuania in Šiauliai, having acknowledged Tadeusz Kościuszko, a self-declared Lithuanian, as Supreme Commander of the Nation on 16 April 1794, named Antoni Chlewiński as the Commander of the insurgent forces in Lithuania. Then, the successful insurgents in Vilnius formed the National Supreme Council of Lithuania as Lithuania's sovereign government, with Jakub Jasiński as commander-in-chief, on April 24. Kościuszko dissolved the Council on June 10 and created the Central Deputation, subordinate to the Supreme National Council. This action weakened Lithuanian support for the uprising.

== In 19th-century Lithuania ==
Even after the Commonwealth's independence was destroyed in the 18th century Partitions, the Polonization of Lithuania continued. Continuing Polish cultural influence led to the 19th-century Lithuanian National Revival as a defensive reaction, when Lithuanian culture slowly reappeared as a vigorous force. However, this revival was seen as a threat by Polish nationalists fighting for an independent Poland.

In the words of the historian Bronius Makauskas:

The main problem with Lithuanian-Polish coexistence has been programmed into their cultural heritage, which each side evaluates differently or does not want to analyze critically at all. The political elite of the Grand Duchy of Lithuania, having adopted the Polish language, opened the gates for Polonization. Neither then nor later did anyone create levers for maintaining or promoting the Lithuanian language. As a result, the process of Lithuanian culture went forward through, and by means of, the Polish language, in which masterpieces of high culture were created in Lithuania. Suffice it to recall Adam Mickiewicz, Władysław Syrokomla, Józef Ignacy Kraszewski, and Stanisław Moniuszko, without whom Polish culture would be inconceivable. Unfortunately for the Lithuanians, the romantic visions and images of Lithuania harbored by Mickiewicz and Kraszewski not only encouraged the Lithuanian patriotic movement that led to so-called “Lithuanian separatism,” but also helped to solidify the Polish image of Lithuania as a Polish area that can in no way be separated from, nor exist independently of, Poland.

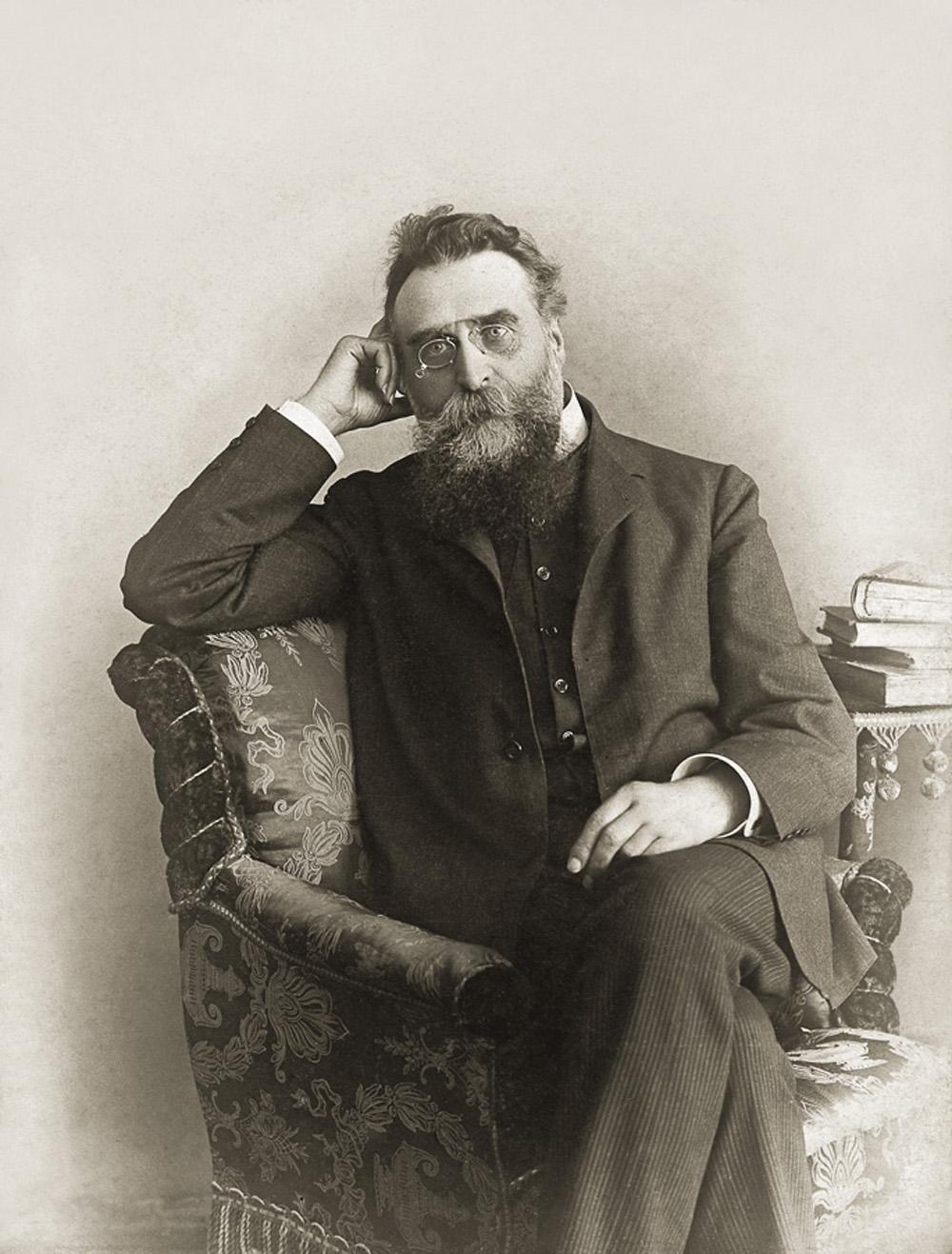
Jonas Basanavičius in 1905

By mid-19th century, the greatest danger to the mere existence of the Lithuanian language was Polonization. Most of the Lithuanian nobility and intelligentsia had long been linguistically polonized, so Lithuanian was mostly spoken by the common people and those closest to them, namely the Catholic priests. Those climbing in the social hierarchy sought to show their "social superiority" by using the Polish language. Even the Lithuanians of the Lithuanian National Revival were deeply affected by the Polish language, for example, Bishop Motiejus Valančius wrote his "notes to self" in Polish and even the activist Jonas Basanavičius wrote in his diary entry from March 2 (14), 1887, in Polish: "work hard – do not seek empty honor, but be positive – avoid fighting windmills – less words, more deeds – always have the goal you are striving for in front of your eyes!!!". The future creator of the Lithuanian anthem, Vincas Kudirka, who saw himself as a Pole, changed his views after reading Aušra. Moreover, Vincas Kudirka in 1889 founded a Lithuanian language monthly newspaper Varpas, which formulated Lithuanians political goals by rejecting Lithuania's historic connection to Poland and resisting the oppression by the Russian Empire.

The conscious efforts to revive the Lithuanian language and bring it to the heights of an educated literary language did not please the Poles. The appearance of Aušra in autumn 1883 immediately caused a polemic in the Polish press. The Lithuanians' concern for their native language displeased the Poles and the interethnic relations soon became grounds for conflict, somethimes even physical violence.

Many Poles, as well as the thoroughly Polonized part of Lithuanian nobility, pejoratively called the Lithuanian National Revival, its activists and adherents, Lithuanian separatists and label them as people that were sick with a form of mania – Lithuanomania (Polish: litwomania). Many Poles continued to deny the legitimacy of the movement and continued to maintain that Lithuania was merely a part of Poland, whereas Lithuanians were simply Poles speaking a different language.

Already before with the appearance of Aušra in the diaspora, especially in America, struggles began for the rights of the Lithuanian language, primarily in churches. Aušra transferred this local-level struggle to the plane of national understanding. From the Polish perspective, the Lithuanian National Revival presaged the end of the Union of Lublin and the Polish–Lithuanian Union. Starting in the early 1880s, this period of revival was marked by a fierce duel between the Lithuanian and Polish languages in across Lithuania Proper, which first began in the churches and the press. However, the situation was more complicated than only direct conflict. A renewed focus on Lithuanian distinctness did not necessarily mean hostility to Poland as friendly relations with Poland were sometimes seen as the only real chance for Lithuania's independence. The Social Democratic Party of Lithuania laid out in its programme in 1896 the ideal of an "independent democratic republic consisting of Lithuania, Poland and other countries, founded on a free federation", still reminiscent of the Polish–Lithuanian Commonwealth over a century after it ceased to exist.

== 20th century ==
Increasingly incompatible interests ultimately led to the Polish–Lithuanian War between the two nations that had jointly fought for independence in the uprisings of 1794, 1830–1831, 1863–1864.

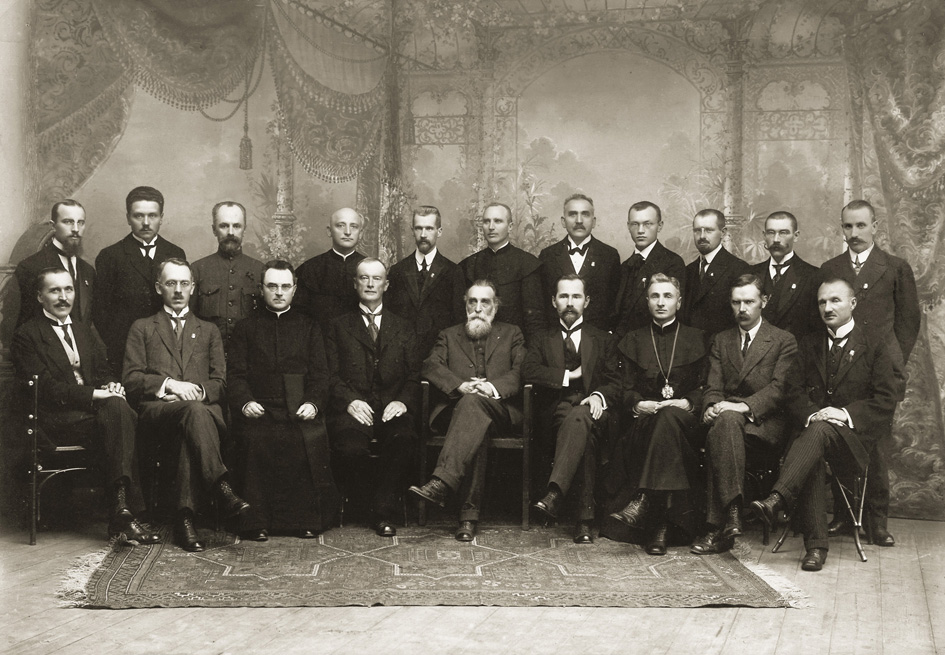
The original 20 members of the Council of Lithuania after signing the Act of Independence of Lithuania in 1918

On 16 February 1918, the Council of Lithuania in Vilnius adopted the Act of Independence of Lithuania where they proclaimed the restoration of the independent State of Lithuania, with Vilnius as its capital, and declared the termination of all state ties which formerly bound this State to other nations.

The aspiration of Lithuanian independence was incomprehensible to the Polish elite. Many Poles viewed the Lithuanian rejection of ancient and sometimes even described as "holy" traditions of the Polish–Lithuanian Union as tantamount to betrayal. The leader of newly independent Poland, Józef Piłsudski, declared himself as a "son of Lithuania", desired to create a new form of the Grand Duchy of Lithuania that would be united to Poland, whereas Roman Dmowski's National Democracy camp wanted the direct incorporation of Lithuania and other so-called Eastern Borderlands into the Second Polish Republic. Either way, Lithuania was seen as belonging to Poland, which led to the Polish–Lithuanian War as the realisation set in among the Polish elite that Lithuania could not be taken without force. The Polish representatives to the West declared themselves not to be against Lithuanian independence as such, but to only have some territorial pretensions. Even so, the Polish Military Organisation organised the failed 1919 Polish coup attempt in Lithuania to install a pro-Polish government in Kaunas.

Thus, the complicated situation in the aftermath of World War I, gave rise to a situation where both sides saw each other as having betrayed each other. The Lithuanians felt betrayed by the Polish actions of the Sejny Uprising, which took away one of the centres of Lithuanian National Revival from Lithuania, the 1919 Polish coup attempt in Lithuania and what they saw as the Polish occupation of Vilnius, their historical capital, in a dishonourable false-flag Żeligowski's Mutiny, whereas many Poles saw the newly independent interwar Lithuania that was fighting for its independence as an anti-Polish project, created by Poland's biggest enemies – Germany and Soviet Russia – to divide and weaken Poland. Interwar Polish diplomats persistently asserted to the Allies that the Lithuanian aspirations of independence and the opposition to a renewed Polish–Lithuanian union, which they labelled as Lithuanian separatism, were actually Russian and German intrigues against the reborn and peaceful Polish state. The Polish military attempts to incorporate restored Lithuania into "the Great Poland" resulted in the Polish–Lithuanian War during which Lithuania suffered territorial loses to Poland (Suwałki Region and Vilnius Region), however Lithuanians maintained sovereignty in the remaining territory of Lithuania and temporarily relocated their capital to Kaunas. Nevertheless, a part of the Polish speakers in Vilnius supported Lithuania's independence and its claims to capital city Vilnius (e.g. Michał Pius Römer, Stanisław Narutowicz). Tadeusz Wróblewski defended Vilnian Lithuanians who acted against Polish authority in Vilnius. In 1922, the Lithuanians formally renounced the 1569 Union of Lublin. Upon reflecting on the development of Lithuanian historiography, the famous Lithuanian historian Zenonas Ivinskis wrote in 1940, that "If in the 19th century our history enthusiasts entered into history guided by the current interests of their time, it was appropriate. Then everything that could be found against the Poles was also useful, wherever Lithuanian separatism manifested itself, which had to be emphasized all the time, because it was necessary to separate from the Poles."

== See also ==
- Polish question

== Sources ==
=== In English ===
- Ambroziak, Tomasz (2014). "The necessity to reexamine the question of Lithuanian particularism during the reign of Sigismund III and Władysław IV (English)" (PDF). Zapiski Historyczne. LXXIX (4): 89. doi:10.15762/ZH.2014.17. ISSN 2449-8637.
- Augustyniak, Urszula (2016-01-01). History of the Polish-Lithuanian Commonwealth. Polish Studies – Transdisciplinary Perspectives. Vol. 13. Peter Lang D. doi:10.3726/978-3-653-05491-0. ISBN 978-3-653-99731-6.
- Makauskas, Bronius (Winter 2012). Skrupskelytė, Viktorija (ed.). "Twists in Lithuanian-Polish Relations after the Reestablishment of Independence: A Historian's Reflections". Lituanus. 58 (4). ISSN 0024-5089.
- Pawlikowska-Butterwick, Wioletta (2017). "'Lithuanians', 'Foreigners' and Ecclesiastical Office: Law and Practice in the Sixteenth-Century Grand Duchy Of Lithuania". The Journal of Ecclesiastical History. 68 (2): 285–305. doi:10.1017/S0022046916000646. ISSN 0022-0469.
- Ziober, Aleksandra (2019-01-01). "Lithuanian aspirations for an equality with the Crown in the 17th century. An attempt to systematize". Open Political Science. 2 (1): 181–187. doi:10.1515/openps-2019-0017. ISSN 2543-8042.
- Wójcik, Zbigniew (1994). "The Separatist Tendencies in the Grand Duchy of Lithuania in the 17th century" (PDF). Acta Poloniae Historica. 69. ISSN 0001-6829.
- Frost, Robert (2015). The Oxford History of Poland-Lithuania. The Making of the Polish-Lithuanian Union, 1385—1569. Oxford. ISBN 978-0-19-820869-3.
- Kosman, Marceli (1989). ""Podniesienie" książąt litewskich" ["Elevation" of the Lithuanian princes]. Litwa pierwotna. Mity, legendy, fakty. pp. 244–282.

=== In Lithuanian ===
- Birgelis, Sigitas (2010). "Kovų dėl Seinų klausimu (1918-1919)" (PDF). Terra Jatwezenorum (in Lithuanian). 2. ISSN 2080-7589.
- Ivinskis, Zenonas (1940). Eretas, Juozas (ed.). Lietuvos istorija romantizmo metu ir dabar. Lietuvių katalikų mokslo akademijos suvažiavimo darbai (in Lithuanian). Vol. III. „Šviesos“ spaustuvė.
- Kasparavičius, Algimantas (2002). "Don Kichotas prieš Prometėją : tarpukario lietuvių-lenkų iracionalioji diplomatija". Darbai ir Dienos (in Lithuanian). 30. doi:10.7220/2335-8769.30.5. ISSN 1392-0588.
- Vidzgiris, Julius (September 1983). "Lietuva po 100 metų nuo „Aušros" pasirodymo" (PDF). Į Laisvę (in Lithuanian). 88 (125).

=== In Polish ===
- Bobiatyński, Konrad (2020-05-14). "Aktywność senatorów litewskich podczas sejmów z pierwszego okresu panowania Jana III Sobieskiego (1676-1683) i ich stosunek do najważniejszych problemów państwa w świetle wotów senatorskich". Saeculum Christianum (in Polish). 27: 131–146. doi:10.21697/sc.2020.27.w.sp.10. ISSN 1232-1575.
- Ochmański, Jerzy (1990). Historia Litwy (in Polish) (3rd ed.). Wrocław–Warszawa–Kraków: Zakład Narodowy im. Ossolińskich.
- Meilus, Eimantas (2019). "Unia lubelska w historiografii litewskiej XXI w." (PDF). Biuletyn Historii Pogranicza. 19. ISSN 1641-0033.
