= Franciszek Ksawery Niesiołowski =

Polish–Lithuanian colonel and politician

- Coat of arms: Korzbok coat of arms
- Born: 18 December 1771; Lyakhavichy, Polish–Lithuanian Commonwealth
- Died: 15 September 1845 (aged 73); Rybitwy, Lublin Voivodeship, Congress Poland
- Father: Józef Niesiołowski
- Mother: Katarzyna née Massalska

Franciszek Ksawery Niesiołowski (18 December 1771 – 15 September 1845) was a colonel in the 6th Lithuanian Foot Regiment, general in the Kościuszko Uprising, the Army of the Duchy of Warsaw, and the Army of the Kingdom of Poland, served during the November Uprising, became a member of the Sejm in 1830, and was Senator-Castellan of the Kingdom of Poland from 8 August 1831.

== Early life ==
Niesiołowski was born on 18 December 1771 in Lachowicze, which at that time belonged to the Massalski family, in Nowogródek Voivodeship, Grand Duchy of Lithuania, a part of the Polish–Lithuanian Commonwealth. He was the son of Józef and Katarzyna (née Massalska) Niesiołowski. The main residence of the Niesiołowski family was Worończa, where they were likely to have been visited by Tadeusz Kościuszko several times during his holidays.

== Polish–Lithuanian Commonwealth ==
In 1788, at the age of 17, Franciszek Niesiołowski became colonel and commander of the 6th Lithuanian Infantry Regiment.

=== War in Defence of the Constitution ===
In 1792, he participated in the War in Defence of the Constitution and was awarded the Order of the Virtuti Militari. He distinguished himself during the Battle of Brest Litovsk.

=== Kościuszko Uprising ===
Niesiołowski was involved in organizing the Kościuszko Uprising and on 16 April 1794, together with Antoni Chlewiński, Romualdas Giedraitis, Alojzy Sulistrowski, Antoni Prozor, and Piotr Zawisza, swore to uphold the Act of Uprising, at Šiauliai, in the Grand Duchy of Lithuania. During the uprising, he was promoted to the rank of major general by Tadeusz Kościuszko and fought in many battles, including the Vilnius uprising and Battle of Saločiai. He distinguished himself with his regiment on 7 May 1794 at the Battle of Polyany (near Ashmyany) and in June–July in a raid on Courland. When Franciszek Niesiołowski was operating in Samogitia, he captured a Russian courier to Saint Petersburg detailing all the Russian units in the Kingdom of Poland and the exact Russian casualties at the Battle of Racławice.

In September 1794, he was taken prisoner by the Russian forces. In Hrodna, the Russian General Repnin, in response to a request from Niesiołowski's parents to meet with the detainee, encouraged Niesiołowski to swear allegiance to Catherine II, but he refused. After the rebellion, he retired from military service and travelled to Germany in 1796, coming back to Lithuania two years later.

== Napoleonic Wars ==
On 31 August 1812, at the beginning of Napoleon's invasion of Russia, Dirk van Hogendorp appointed Franciszek Niesiołowski as General Inspector of the Lithuanian Infantry in the Military Committee of the Provisional Government of Lithuania. Although nominally a general, this entailed no field command responsibilities; instead he served in the 1813 Campaign as a soldier in the four-company-strong Polish Guards of Honour, commanded by Stanisław Wojczyński, which consisted of surplus officers from the Duchy of Warsaw's Army (there was a disproportionate ratio of officers to men, in favour of officers, due to heavy losses incurred during the invasion).

== Congress Poland ==
After Napoleon's 1st abdication in 1814 and the Tsar's amnesty, Franciszek Niesiołowski returned to sell his ancestral estates in the former Grand Duchy of Lithuania, thereafter leaving for Congress Poland. Niesiołowski formed part of the honorary guard company of fifty officers, of whom many were former comrades-in-arms of the honorand, at the funeral of Józef Poniatowski in 1817.

== November Uprising ==
On the first day of the Uprising of 1830, Niesiołowski donated 15,000 złotys in bonds to the national cause. From 18 December, he was a member of the Sejm. From January to 6 February, he was in service as the Deputy of the Military Governor of Warsaw. On 25 January 1831, Franciszek Niesiołowski signed the Act of Dethronement of Nicholas I as the representative of the Kazimierz Powiat of the Lublin Voivodeship in the Sejm of the Uprising. On 24 March 1831, Niesiołowski was assigned the command of an infantry brigade, comprising the 12th Infantry Regiment and 13th Infantry Regiment, which was stationed in Stężyca near the Vistula. However, he was considered to be inept by his commander Jan Skrzynecki and was already back in the Sejm on 7 May, although he was only officially dismissed nearly two months later, on 25 June. While fleeing to Prussia, he was arrested by the Russians and exiled to Vologda.

== Later life ==
After his release in 1833, he returned to his estates in Lithuania. When he died on 15 September 1845, he was buried in the parish church of Rybitwy.

Niesiołowski was a freemason.

== Bibliography ==
- Marakoŭ, Leanid U. (2003). "НЕСЯЛОЎСКІ Францішак Ксаверы". Рэпрэсаваныя літаратары, навукоўцы, работнікі асветы, грамадскія і культурныя дзеячы Беларусі, 1794–1991. Vol. 3. Minsk. ISBN 985-6374-04-9.
