= Wyżnica (river) =

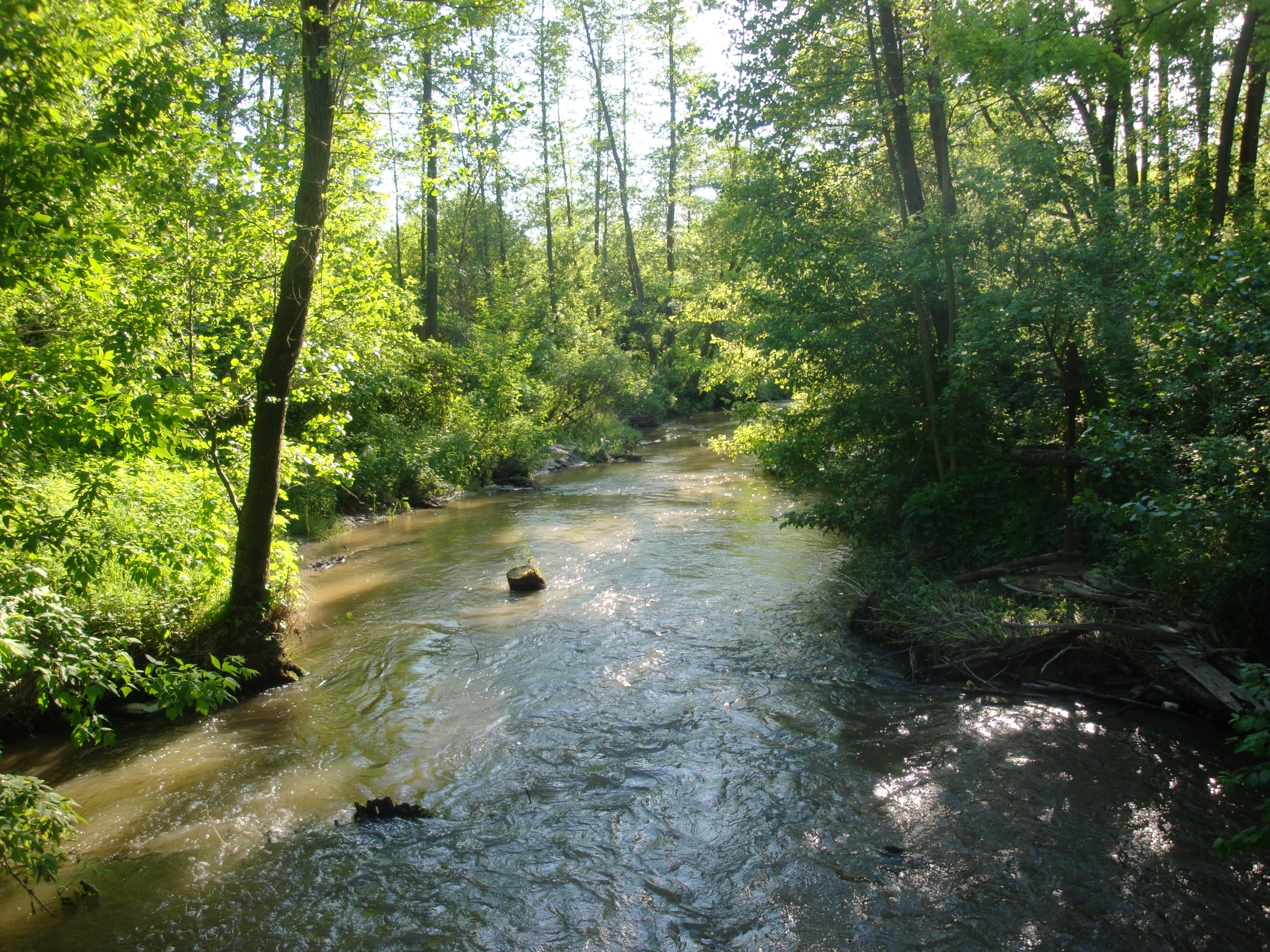
- Wyżnica in village Bór

Location
- Country: Poland

Physical characteristics
- Mouth
  - location: Vistula
  - coordinates: 51°02′22″N 21°49′34″E
- Length: 43.93 km (27.30 mi)

Basin features
- Progression: Vistula→ Baltic Sea
- Tributaries
  - right: Urzędówka, Podlipie

The Wyżnica, known also as Wyżnianka, Struga, Stróżka, and Rybitwa, is a river in the Lublin Upland region in Lublin Voivodeship, Poland. It is 43.93km long. Wyżnica has its source at Słodków Trzeci in gmina Kraśnik. It is a right tributary of Vistula near Józefów nad Wisłą. It runs through Kraśnik, Wyżnica, Dzierzkowice, and Rybitwy. Its right tributaries include Urzędówka and Podlipie.

In 2006, a retention reservoir on Wyżnica was built in Kraśnik.

== See also ==
- Rivers of Poland
