= Vilnius Uprising =

Vilnius Uprising may refer to:

- Vilnius Uprising (1794), an uprising of Polish-Lithuanian forces during the Kościuszko Uprising against the Russian Empire in 1794
- Operation Ostra Brama, a failed uprising by the Polish Home Army against Nazi Germany in July 1944
