= Słodków Trzeci =

- Village
- Location within Poland
- Coordinates: 50°53′N 22°18′E
- Country: Poland
- Voivodeship: Lublin
- County: Kraśnik
- Gmina: Kraśnik
- Population: 700

Słodków Trzeci [ˈswɔtkuf ˈtʂɛt͡ɕi] is a village in the administrative district of Gmina Kraśnik, within Kraśnik County, Lublin Voivodeship, in eastern Poland. In Słodków, there is source of Wyżnica, the right inflow of Wistula.

In 2006 the village had a population of 700.
