= Romuald Tadeusz Giedroyć =

Polish-Lithuanian prince and military officer

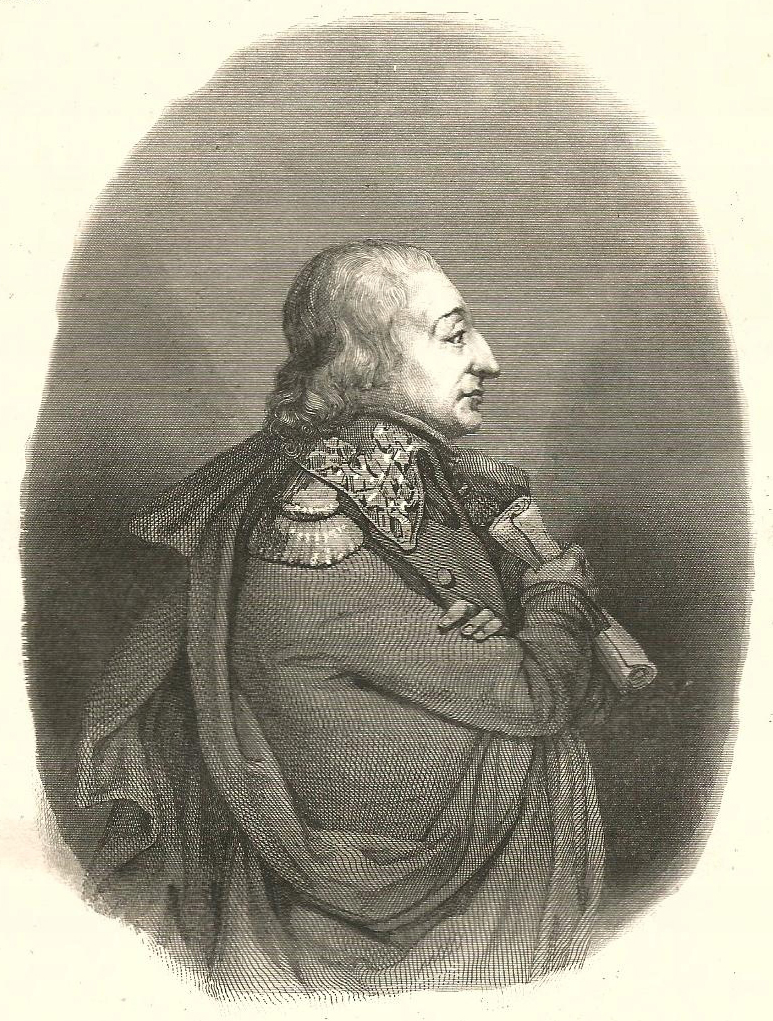
- Portrait of Giedroyć in the uniform of a General of the artillery Coat of arms: Hipocentaur
- Born: 7 February 1750; Babtinas, Grand Duchy of Lithuania, Polish–Lithuanian Commonwealth
- Died: 15 October 1824 (aged 74); Warsaw, Congress Poland, Russian Empire
- Military career
- Allegiance: Polish–Lithuanian Commonwealth (1765–1794); Lithuanian Provisional Governing Commission (1812–1813)
- Branch: Polish–Lithuanian Commonwealth Army
- Service years: 1765–1794, 1812–1813
- Rank: major general, 1792
- Units: Lieutenant-general (Lithuanian Cavalry Division, 1813)
- Conflicts: Bar Confederation; War of 1792; Kościuszko Uprising; Battle of Saločiai 1794; Battle of Praga
- Awards: Order of Saint Stanislaus (1790)

Romuald Tadeusz Giedroyć (Lithuanian: Romualdas Giedraitis; French: Romuald Gedroitze; 7 February 1750 – 15 October 1824) was a Polish-Lithuanian prince from the princely Giedroyć family, who fought in the Bar Confederation, War of 1792 and the Uprising of 1794 as part of the Grand Ducal Lithuanian Army. From mid-1812 to early 1813, Giedroyć was also the commander of the Polish-Lithuanian regiments raised during the French invasion of Russia. In early 1813, he was captured by the Russians and exiled to Arkhangelsk. In 1815, Alexander I of Russia amnestied Giedroyć and made him a Lieutenant general of the Army of Congress Poland.

== Biography ==
He came from a Lithuanian princely family. His father was Józef Giedroyć, starosta of Bernatowszczyzna, his mother was Józefa Kiełpsz. He was born on 7 February 1750 in Babtinas.

=== Bar Confederation ===
From 1765, he was in the Corps of Cadets in Warsaw. Giedroyć began his military career in 1765 as a cadet in the 2nd Foot Regiment of the Grand Ducal Lithuanian Army, part of the Polish-Lithuanian military forces. The regiment in which he served followed Casimir Pulaski. In it, Giedroyć reached the rank of major. In 1771, he served in the unit led by Michał Kazimierz Ogiński. At the battle of Stołowicze in 1771, Giedraitis was distinguished by his valour and was wounded eight times.

After a long recovery he became vice-commander of the 1st Lithuanian National Cavalry Brigade in 1778. In 1784 he was delegate to the Grodno Sejm.

=== War of 1792 ===
Giedroyć fought in the War of 1792, during it he was elevated to the rank of major general. When Stanisław August Poniatowski signed the Targowica Confederation, Giedroyć wrote a letter to the king demanding to be released from military service.

=== Uprising of 1794 ===
In 1794, he was one of the organizers of the Kościuszko Uprising in the Grand Duchy of Lithuania. On April 16 in Šiauliai, together with Antoni Prozor, Piotr Zawisza and Franciszek Niesiołowski, announced the first act of uprising in Lithuania. On April 18, Giedryoć with 200 cavalrymen advanced to Šatės, where he fought against Kossakowski's regiment which supported the Russians. From April 24, he was a member of the Lithuanian National Supreme Council. On April 30 he arrived to Vilnius.

From June to August, he commanded the Samogitian Division's right wing. Together with Tomasz Wawrzecki, they took over Liepāja. In July, Giedroyć took over Salistrovski's command of a corps, and on July 3, fought with the Imperial Russian Army near Pušalotas. A week later, on July 10, the Russians attacked him once more. After a fortnight and a few more days, on July 28, Giedraitis won a battle near Vaiškai. On July 29, he won the Battle of Saločiai 1794. In the battle, he dealt a heavy defeat to the stronger Russian unit of Lieutenant General Sergei Fedorovich Golitsyn. Thanks to this victory, southern Courland came under the control of the insurrectionary forces. Tadeusz Kościuszko promoted him to the rank of Lieutenant general. Moreover, Kościuszko gave Giedroyć the permission to raise a regiment named Sałaty. Following the victorious fight on July 29, he went towards Johaniszkiele.

On 8 September 1794, he took over the command of the Lithuanian army in the Kościuszko Uprising from Antoni Chlewiński. At the time, he marched to Orany. From there, he retreated towards the Kingdom of Poland. On November 3, near Stara Wieś, he joined Jan Henryk Dąbrowski. At the time, Romuald Giedroyć had 2,000 infantrymen, 700 cavalrymen and 17 cannons under his command. On November 4, already after the battle of Praga, he was recalled to Warsaw. However, on November 5, he stopped near Tarczyn, and received Wawrzecki on November 10, who was retreating from Warsaw. After his soldiers began dispersing, Giedroyć and others surrendered to the Russians at Radoszyce, being the last of the rebels to surrender.

=== From 1795 to 1812 ===
After the uprising's defeat, he emigrated to Paris. He went there together with Tadeusz Mostowski, both being part of the Polish Deputation, a committee that sought the support of the French government. In Paris, Giedroyć became acquainted with Josephine Beauharnais. Quickly thereafter, he came back to Lithuania. In February 1796, he was sent by the committee to Lithuania in order to encourage the insurrectionary spirit. He first stopped in Dresden, but, seeing no way of being useful to the cause of independence, he retired to his lands, where he lived until 1812. Nevertheless, In 1797, he was involved in the Ciecierski conspiracy. In fact, he was a founder of a secret patriotic organization in Lithuania in 1797.

=== Napoleon's Invasion of Russia ===
During the French invasion of Russia in 1812, the day after Napoleon entered Vilnius, on 29 June 1812, an act of renewal of the Polish-Lithuanian Union was proclaimed at Vilnius Cathedral on the initiative of university students. In the following days, this act was signed by several thousand people, and the signatures were collected at the home of Romuald Giedroyć. Later he was made Chairman of the Military Committee of the Lithuanian Provisional Governing Commission. He was also the Inspector General of the Lithuanian regiments and Pospolite ruszenie formed for Napoleon's army.

On 31 August 1812, General Van Hogendorp appointed him commander of the emerging Lithuanian military units.

=== War of the Sixth Coalition ===
During Napoleon's retreat, Giedroyć crossed the Nemunas and the Vistula. On 12–13 February 1813, the Lithuanian cavalry division, which included the 17th Lithuanian Uhlan Regiment, led by him was surprised and defeated by a Russian vanguard of Cossacks under General Chernyshev near Sieraków. He was wounded during his capture. He was captured by the Russians and imprisoned in Arkhangelsk until 1815. He was amnestied by Alexander I of Russia.

He was part of the Army of Congress Poland with the rank of the Imperial Russian Divisional General. He was a member of the military committee charged with the army's organisation.

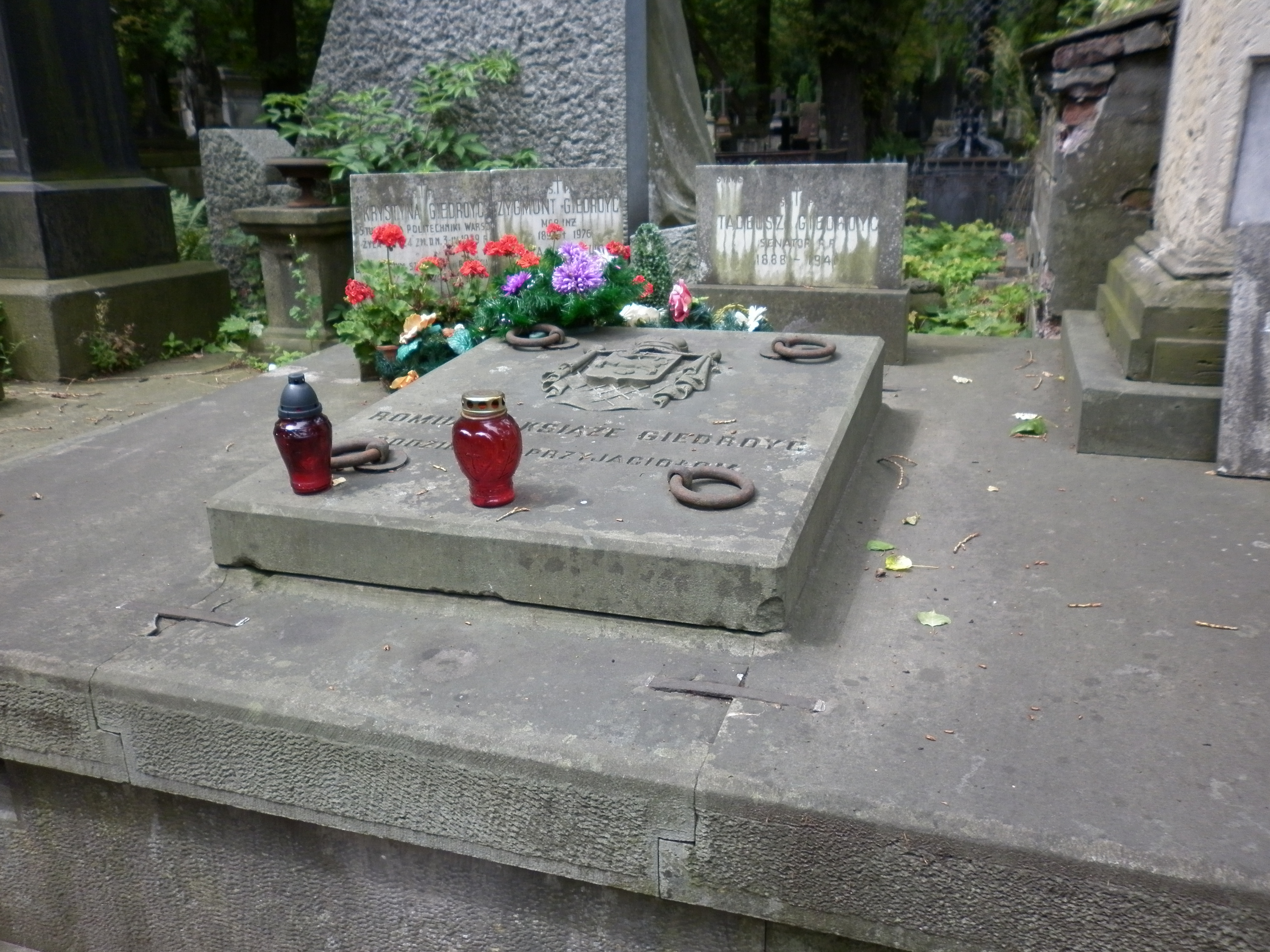
Tomb of Romuald Giedroyć

== Family ==
Romuald Giedroyć married Karolina Anna Borzymowska (1766-1858), their children were:

- Ludwik Jerzy (born 1785)
- Stefan Józef Franciszek Ksawery Giedroyć (1787-1855), Colonel of the French Army (1808-1815), fought in the Battle of Waterloo. He received French citizenship in 1835, as Joseph Étienne François Xavier, prince Giedroyc. He married Franciszka Szymańska in 1821.
- Kunegunda Franciszka Róża Giedroyć (1793-1883), Lady-in-waiting of Empress Joséphine and the Russian Empress Elizabeth Alexeievna. She married Jerzy Białopiotrowicz (1785-1871) in 1825.
- Barbara Łucja Giedroyć (1798-1886), wife of general Józef Rautenstrauch (1773-1842) from 1828
- Aleksander Konstanty Julian Giedroyć (1805-1844), Kammerherr of the Imperial Russian palaces. He married Alina Aleksandra Podoska in 1841

== Commemoration ==
On 30 April 2004, the General Romualdas Giedraitis Artillery Battalion of the Lithuanian Armed Forces was given the name of General Romuald Giedroyć.

== Sources ==
- Ivinskis, Zenonas; Biržiška, Vaclovas (1956). "Romualdas Giedraitis". Lietuvių Enciklopedija (in Lithuanian). Vol. 7. United States of America.
- Daugirdas, A. (2021). "Divizijos Generolas Kunigaikštis Romualdas Gedraitis" (in Lithuanian). Archived from the original on 9 October 2021.
- Jasas, Rimantas (2004). "Romualdas Giedraitis (1750)". Visuotinė lietuvių enciklopedija (in Lithuanian). Vol. VI (Fau-Goris). Vilnius: Mokslo ir enciklopedijų leidybos institutas.
- Jasas, Rimantas (2021). "Romualdas Giedraitis". Vle.lt (in Lithuanian). Mokslo ir enciklopedijų leidybos centras. Archived from the original on 8 October 2021.
- Michaud, Louis Gabriel (1838). "Giedroyc". Biographie universelle, ancienne et moderne (in French). Vol. 65. Paris: Imprimerie de Paul Dupont et Cie. p. 322.
- Mościcki, Henryk (1958). "Romuald Tadeusz Giedroyć". Polski Słownik Biograficzny (in Polish). Vol. 7. Wrocław. pp. 432–433.
- Judycki, Zbigniew; Judycki, Maksymilian (2021). Polacy w Armii Napoleona - Słownik Biograficzny Dowódców (PDF). Warsaw. ISBN 978-83-66640-51-1.
- Nawrot, Dariusz (2008). Litwa i Napoleon w 1812 roku. Katowice. ISBN 9788322617489.
