= Samogitian Division =

1794 military unit

- Žemaičių divizija
- Active: 1794
- Allegiance: Grand Duchy of Lithuania
- Size: 10,000 (July 1794)

The Samogitian Division (Lithuanian: Žemaičių divizija) was a division-size unit of rebels of the Grand Duchy of Lithuania during the Kościuszko Uprising in 1794.

== Composition ==
The Samogitian Division consisted of rebels from the Duchy of Samogitia and the counties of Upytė, Kaunas and Ukmergė. At the beginning of July, the division had 15 regiments, totalling about 10,000 people. However, only three of those were from the regular Grand Ducal Lithuanian Army, with the majority being county militias and groups of pospolite ruszenie, both noble and peasant.

== Commander ==
The division's overall commander was Tomasz Wawrzecki.

== History ==
The Samogitian division defended northern Lithuania from the Imperial Russian army stationed in Courland, fighting it between Akmenė and Biržai. The division's left wing took over Liepoja and part of Courland west of Venta river from June 25 to July 12, and then again from 8 August to the end of that same month. The division's right wing, led by Romuald Giedroyć, defeated the Russian army in the Battle of Saločiai (1794) on July 29. In late July–September 1794, the Samogitian division withdrew from Courland and Samogitia to Užnemunė and the Kingdom of Poland.

Finally, on 18 November 1794, the division capitulated in Radoszyce.

== Sources ==
- Jasas, Rimantas (2021). "Žemaičių divizija". Vle.lt (in Lithuanian). Archived from the original on 9 October 2021.
