= 3rd Lithuanian Vanguard Regiment =

- Active: 1776-1795
- Country: Grand Duchy of Lithuania
- Type: Cavalry
- Garrison/HQ: Loyew (1789); Mazyr (1789-1790); Strzeszyn (1791); Vilkaviškis (1792)
- Engagements: War in Defence of the Constitution: Battle of Zelwa; Kościuszko Uprising: Battle of Maciejowice; Battle of Praga

The 3rd Lithuanian Vanguard Regiment (Polish: 3 Pułk Litewski Przedniej Straży) was a military unit of the Grand Duchy of Lithuania. The full name was 3rd Advance Guard Regiment Field Hetman of Lithuania Antoni Chlewinkiego.

== History ==
=== Origins ===
Formed in 1776.

=== Great Sejm 1788-1792 ===
The regiment was stationed in Mazyr & Loyew (1789), Mazyr (1790), Strzeszyn (1791), Vilkaviškis (Oct 1792).

=== War in Defence of the Constitution ===
The regiment fought in the battle of Zelwa.

=== Kościuszko Uprising ===
The unit partook in the battles of Krupczyce, Brzesc, Maciejowice, Praga.

== Uniforms ==
In the Polish Army Museum, there is a yellow metal plume-holder from 1776 to 1789, which is enamelled with the king's cypher (turquoise), a crown (blue and gold), wreath (blue with red ribbons) and metal feathers (turquoise and red). The officers had blue konfederatkas, which were adorned with white cockades and plumes, whereas the towarzycz had blue belts. On their left shoulders, the troopers had blue shoulder straps.

== Commanders ==
Pułkowniks of the regiment:

- Kazimierz Romanowski (1785),
- gen. mjr. Antoni Chlewiński (1791-?),
- Piruski.
