= General Romualdas Giedraitis Artillery Battalion =

- Generolo Romualdo Giedraičio artilerijos batalionas
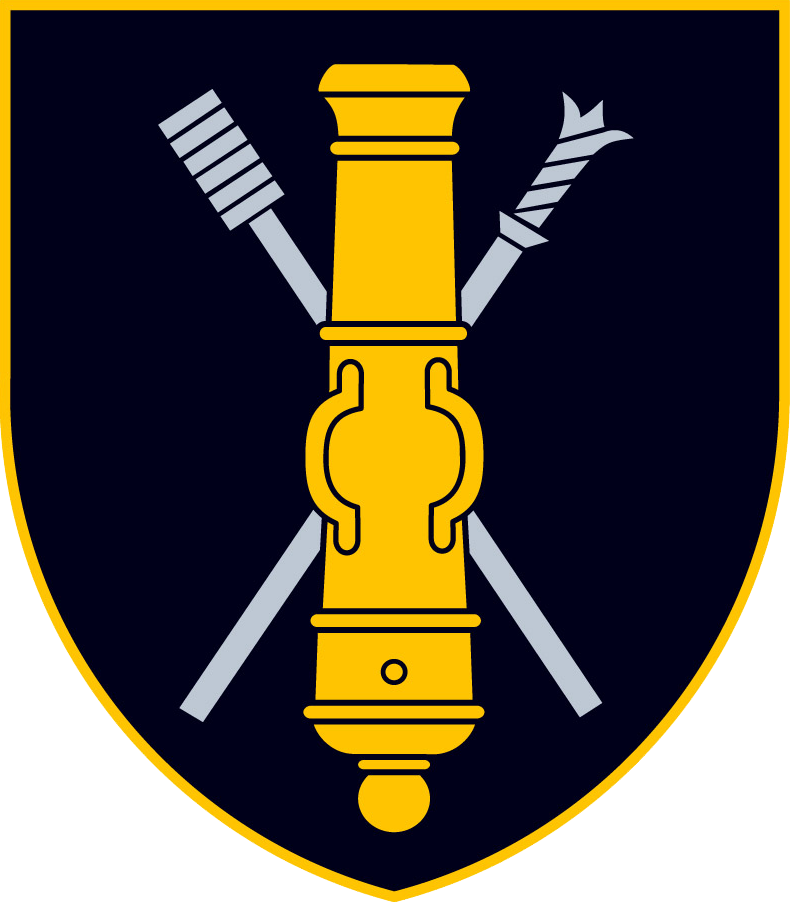
- Insignia
- Active: 2000–present
- Country: Lithuania
- Branch: Lithuanian Land Force
- Type: Artillery
- Role: Fire support
- Size: Battalion
- Part of: Iron Wolf Mechanised Infantry Brigade
- Garrison/HQ: Rukla
- Patron: General Romualdas Giedraitis
- Equipment: Panzerhaubitze 2000

Commanders
- Current commander: Lieutenant Colonel Aušrius Buikus
- Chief of Staff: Major Marijus Jonelis

Insignia
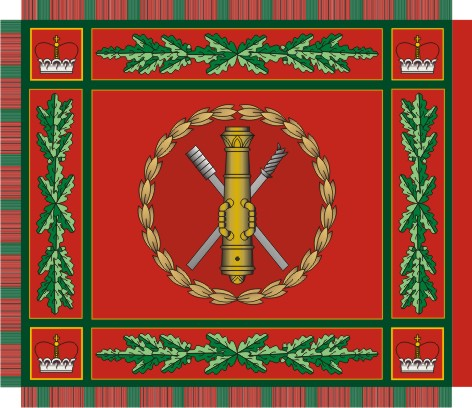
- Flag

The General Romualdas Giedraitis Artillery Battalion, named after Romualdas Giedraitis, equipped with 155mm howitzers, was founded in December 2000, under a joint Lithuanian-Danish project – LITART. The Danish Army provided material and methodical assistance in the founding of the artillery unit.

== History ==
Implementation of the LITART project involved the following four stages:

- The first stage (January 2000 – January 2002) – planning, coordination and preparations for the training of personnel for the Artillery Battalion at artillery and logistic schools in Denmark. The Co-ordination Group was established. The Artillery Battalion received the required technical equipment and armaments.
- The second stage (January 2002 – January 2003)—training of control group officers, armament officers, logistic specialists at the Danish military artillery and logistic schools. 63 military personnel serving with the Artillery Battalion underwent training in Denmark. Establishment of fire posts at Central Training Area of the Lithuanian Armed Forces in Pabradė Training Area and Gaižiūnai Training Area in Rukla. The Artillery Battalion received the required artillery equipment, armaments, technical equipment, modern surveillance devices, navigation systems, most advanced computer equipment, ammunition, modern targeting systems like laser system, termovision, nightvision devices, GPS.
- The third stage (July 2003 – December 2003)—junior grade commander and specialist training course delivered at the Artillery Battalion in Lithuania. Over 90 junior grade officers (gun commanders, anti-tank observers, signal officers, fire control non-commissioned officers, weather specialist etc.) received training. In 2003 the artillery battalion was attached to the Iron Wolf Mechanised Infantry Brigade.
- The fourth stage (May 2004 – February 2005)—training of servicemen of the initial mandatory military service at the Artillery Battalion in Lithuania. During the stage, all troops serving with the Artillery Battalion will receive training, artillery simulator was set up at the Artillery Battalion. In 2004 the artillery battalion was granted with a name in honor of General Romualdas Giedraitis.

== Tasks ==
Main role of the battalion is to support infantry. Other units may have mortars, but the artillery battalion uses only heavier weapons. Artillery may provide support in all types of battle at any time of day under any weather conditions. Artillery fire may be moved from one shooting area to another in order to define the course of the battle.

== Equipment ==
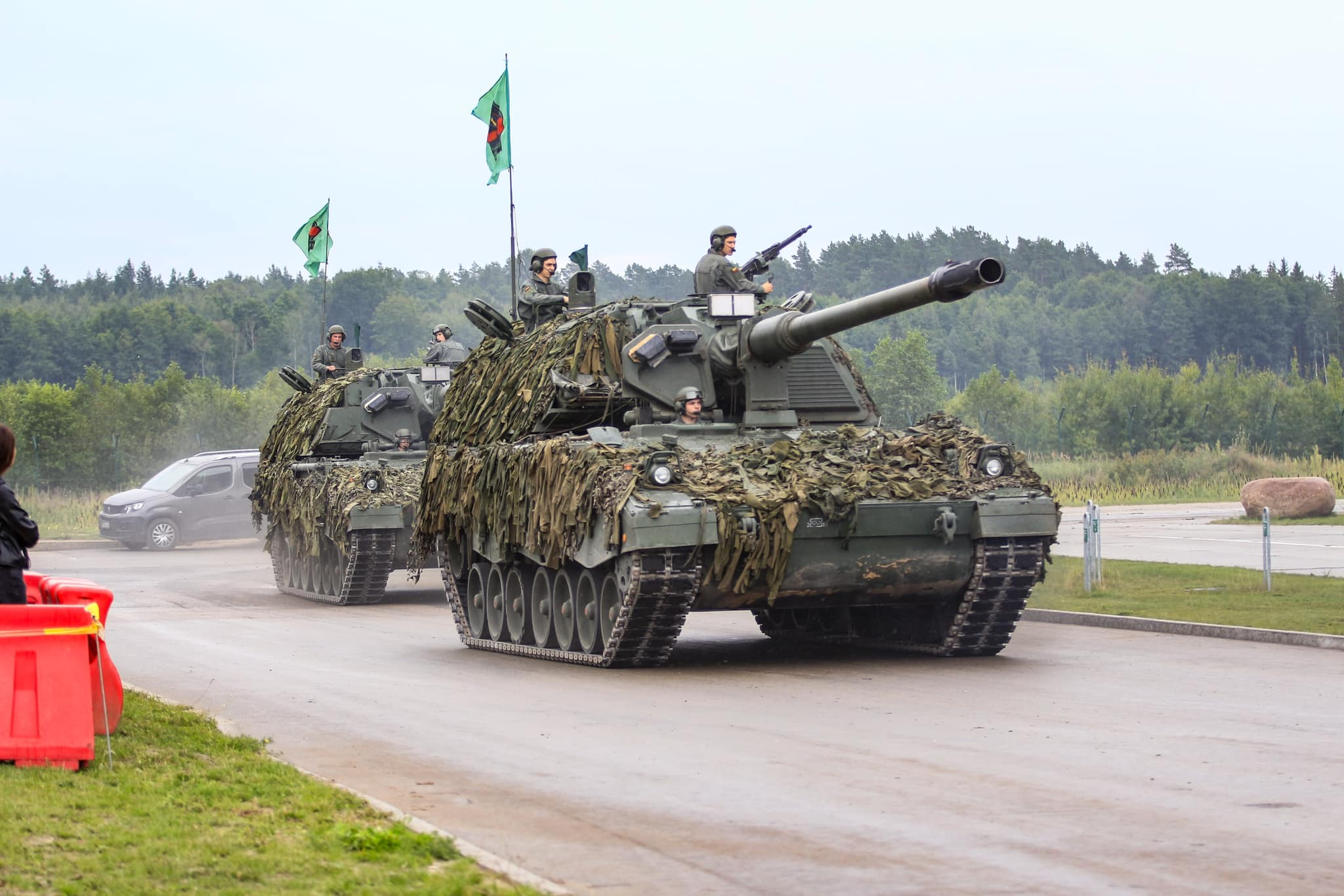
Lithuanian Land Force 155 mm howitzer PzH200

=== Current ===
- 155 mm Panzerhaubitze 2000

=== Former ===
- 105 mm M101 howitzer

== Sources ==
- Lithuanian Armed Forces web site
