= Antoni Chlewiński =

Antoni Chlewiński (1750–1800) was a member of the Polish–Lithuanian landed gentry of the Radwan coat of arms. A lieutenant general of the Lithuanian Army, he fought in both the War of 1792 and Kościuszko Uprising of 1794.

He was the son of Ludwik, Rechytsa's wojski. He was for some time an officer of the Prussian army.

== Polish-Lithuanian Commonwealth ==
=== War of 1792 ===
From 1791 onwards, he was in the Lithuanian Army, becoming the Colonel and commander of the 3rd Lithuanian Vanguard Regiment. During the War of 1792, he commanded the 3rd Lithuanian Vanguard Regiment, whose nominal chief was Michał Zabiełło. Chlewiński stood out as a good tactician and was hence decorated with the Order of Virtuti Militari.

After the war, he remained in service of the Targowica Confederation. In 1793, he was appointed major-general and commander of the 3rd National Cavalry Brigade and was awarded the Order of St. Stanislaus. He was opposed to the Kościuszko Uprising.

=== Kościuszko Uprising ===
On 16 April 1794, in Šiauliai, he swore the Act of Uprising (together with Franciszek Ksawery Niesiołowski, Romuald Giedroyć, Alojzy Sulistrowski, Antoni Prozor, and Piotr Zawisza) and was proclaimed head of the Armed Forces of the Grand Duchy of Lithuania in the Kościuszko Uprising. He approached Vilnius with his troops, which led to the Vilnius Uprising breaking out earlier. Not accepted by the Supreme National Council, Chlewiński was appointed by Tadeusz Kościuszko as commandant of Vilnius and promoted to lieutenant general. He was an opponent of Gen. Jakub Jasinski.

He failed or did not want to defend Vilnius on August 11–12, 1794 against the advancing Russian troops. After the fall of the city, he was accused of treason. Later, he handed over his leadership to the Lithuanian Supreme Government Council established on April 24 and was arrested. In view of the imminent collapse of the uprising, the investigation did not reveal anything.

His fate after the uprising is unknown.

== Bibliography ==
- H. P. Kosk, Generalicja polska t. 1, wyd. Oficyna wydawnicza "Ajaks" Pruszków 1998.
