= Nikolay Arsenyev =

Nikolay Dmitrievich Arsenyev
- Russian: Никола́й Дми́триевич Арсе́ньев
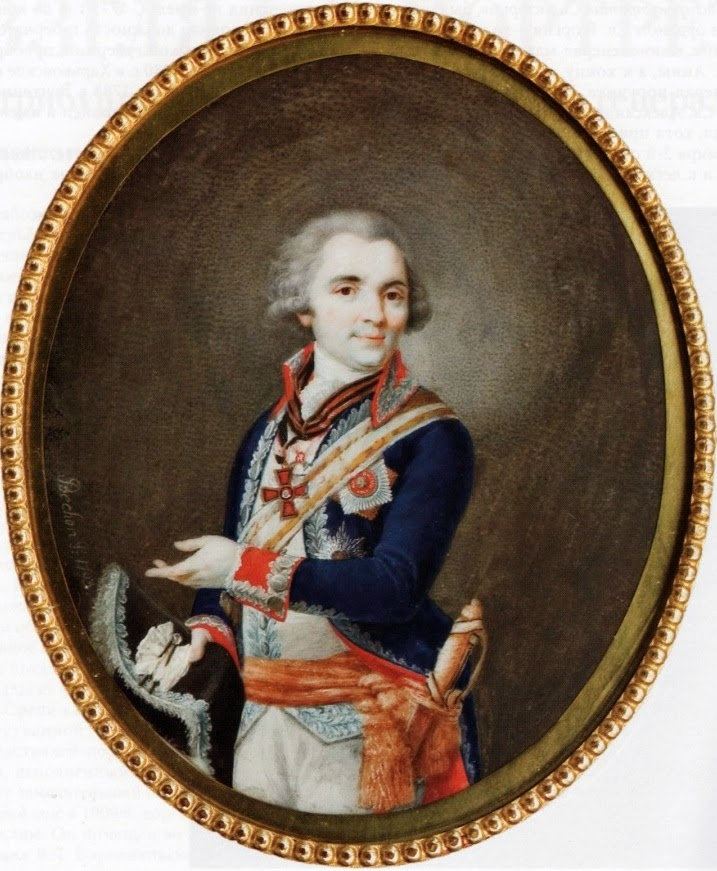
- Arsenyev as pictured on a miniature, dated 1793.
- Born: c. 1739
- Died: 1796
- Military career
- Allegiance: Russian Empire
- Branch: Imperial Russian Army
- Service years: 1760-1794
- Rank: Major-General
- Conflicts: Russo-Turkish War (1768–1774); Russo-Turkish War (1787–1792); Polish–Russian War of 1792; Kościuszko Uprising

Nikolay Dmitrievich Arsenyev (Russian: Никола́й Дми́триевич Арсе́ньев; c. 1739 – 1796) was a major-general of the Russian Empire, who served during the reign of Catherine the Great (r. 1762–1796). He fought at the Russo-Turkish War of 1768-74, the Russo-Turkish War of 1787-92, the Polish–Russian War of 1792 as well as the Kościuszko Uprising.

== Career ==
Nikolay Arsenyev was born around 1739, but according to Prof. Alexander Mikaberidze, the exact date of his birth is unclear. He started his military career in 1760, when he enlisted into the Preobrazhensky Regiment, one of the oldest guard/elite regiments of the Imperial Russian Army. Several years later, he would fight his first war, namely the Russo-Turkish War of 1768-74, and engaged at the battles of Kafa (1771) and Obashtu (1773). In 1780, he was promoted to colonel (polkovnik), seven years later, in 1778, to brigadier, and lastly on 16 February 1790 to major general. During the Russo-Turkish War of 1768-74, he participated in the siege of Izmail, and fought at Tulcea as well. For his deeds at the successful siege of Izmail, he was awarded the Order of Saint George (3rd class) on 5 April 1791. Soon after, he was moved to participate in the Polish–Russian War of 1792 and the relatively shortly ensuing Kościuszko Uprising, led by Tadeusz Kościuszko. In these two years in Poland (1792-1794), Arsenyev fought at several battles, namely those at Nesvizh, Slutsk, as well as Brest-Litovsk. For his deeds at this front, he received the Order of Saint Vladimir (2nd class). However, on 20 April 1794, he was captured by the Poles. He would remain in captivity until the Russians took the city later that same year.

== Sources ==
- Mikaberidze, Alexander (2005). Russian Officer Corps of the Revolutionary and Napoleonic Wars. Savas Beatie. ISBN 978-1611210026.
- Montefiore, Simon Sebag (2015). Catherine the Great and Potemkin: The Imperial Love Affair. Hachette UK. pp. 1–640. ISBN 978-0297866237.
- Степанов, В. С.; Григорович, П. И. (1869). В память столетнего юбилея императорского Военного ордена Святого великомученика и Победоносца Георгия (1769—1869) (in Russian).
