= Zapiski Historyczne =

Zapiski Historyczne (English: Historical Records) is one of the oldest Polish historical journals (quarterly) consisting of articles on the history of Pomerania and the Baltic States, published in Toruń, Poland since 1908. In total, 83 tomes were published (as of 2019). The journal is published by the Toruń Society of Arts and Sciences and the Faculty of History of the Nicolaus Copernicus University. Since the 1960s, the journal has also been publishing texts by authors from the Baltic countries: Lithuania, Latvia, and Estonia.
