= Vilnius uprising (1794) =

Action of the Kościuszko Uprising

- Part of the Kościuszko Uprising
Date	22 April 1794
Location	Vilnius, Grand Duchy of Lithuania, Polish–Lithuanian Commonwealth
Result	Polish-Lithuanian victory

Belligerents
Poland-Lithuania	(Russia) Russian Empire

Commanders and leaders
Jakub Jasiński; Karolis Prozoras	(Russia) Nikolay Arsenyev (Russia) Szymon Kossakowski (executed)

Strength
370	2,000

Casualties and losses
Unknown	Unknown

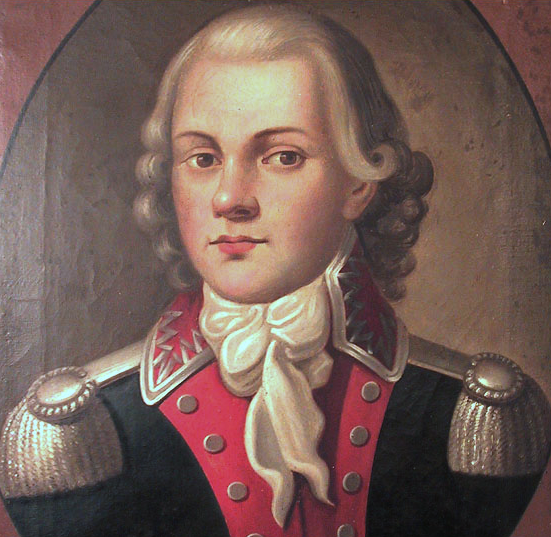
Jakub Jasiński

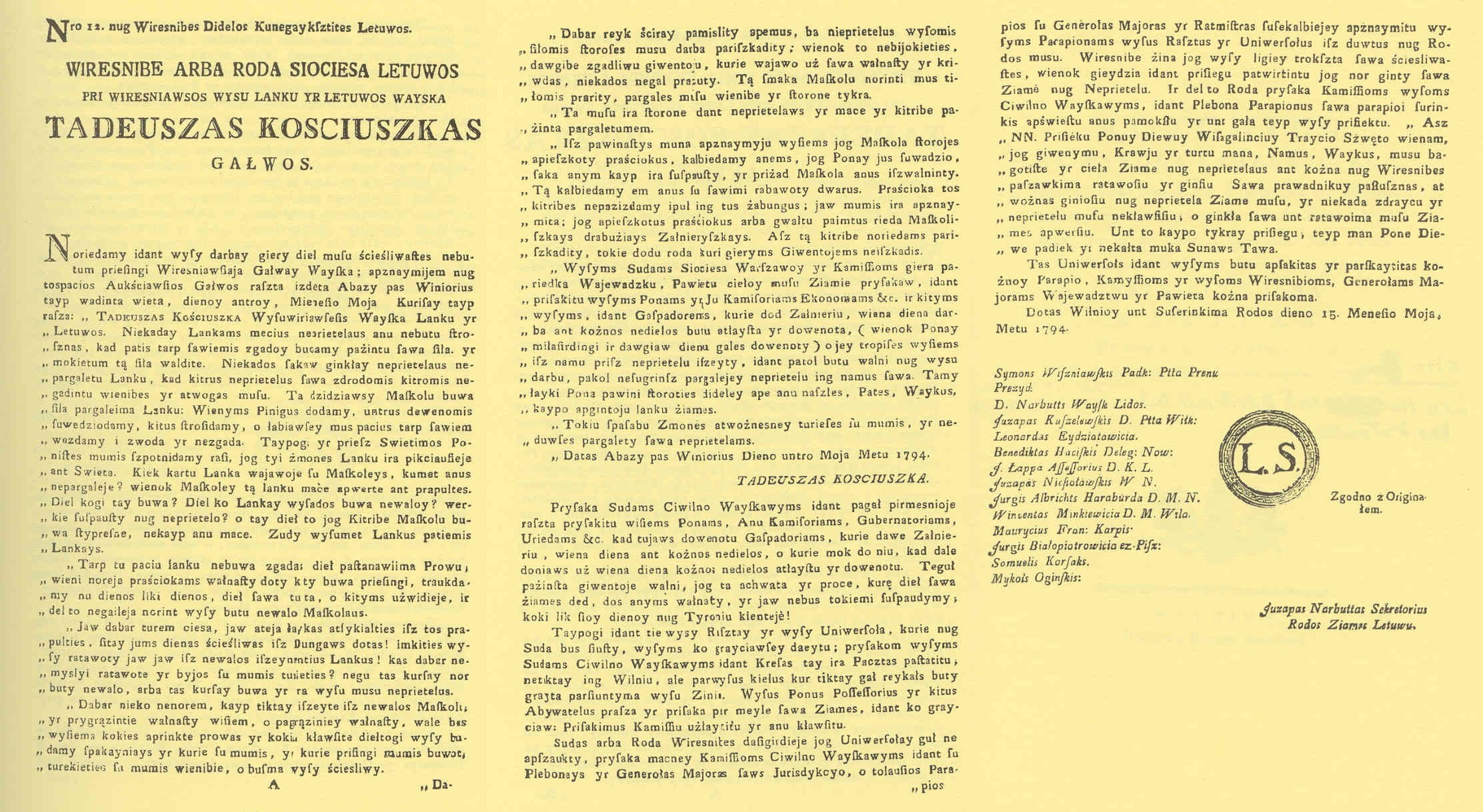
Lithuanian language manifesto of Vilnius uprising, issued and distributed in Vilnius in spring of 1794

The Vilnius Uprising of 1794 (Lithuanian: Vilniaus sukilimas) began on April 22, 1794, during which Polish-Lithuanian force led by Jakub Jasiński fought Russian forces occupying the city during the Kościuszko Uprising. The Russians were expelled from Vilnius, and thanks to Jasiński's skill, no casualties were sustained during the bloodless uprising. Vilnius townspeople also actively participated in the city's defense from the Russians, some even by throwing stones at them.

== Uprising ==
A Russian garrison of some 2,000 was stationed in Vilnius in the spring of 1794, while Commonwealth forces had less than 400 soldiers. On the night of April 11 / 12, upon order of Russian General Nikolay Arsenyev, several rebels were arrested. On April 21, Grand Lithuanian Hetman Szymon Kossakowski came to Vilnius, urging the Russians to capture yet more rebels, and attack rebel forces concentrated around the city. Under the circumstances, Jakub Jasiński decided to initiate the insurrection. It began on the night of April 22 / 23, and after a short fight, the city was under rebel control.

On April 24 the “Act of Rebellion of the Lithuanian Nation” was announced. The rebels declared their unity with the Kościuszko Uprising, which had begun in Lesser Poland. On the same day, April 24, the so-called High Temporary Council was created, headed by the Mayor of Vilnius, Antoni Tyzenhaus, and Voivode of Novogrudok, Józef Niesiołowski. It had 31 members and formed separate offices to manage the military forces, the administration and the treasury. Jakub Jasinski was named commandant of rebel forces in the Grand Duchy of Lithuania. On April 25, Grand Lithuanian Hetman Szymon Marcin Kossakowski was hanged as a traitor of the Commonwealth.

== Aftermath ==
On June 4 Tadeusz Kościuszko dissolved the council, as he regarded it too radical, and replaced it with Central Office of the Grand Duchy of Lithuania. Also, Kościuszko dismissed Colonel Jasiński, naming General Michał Wielhorski commandant of the rebel army in Lithuania.

Preparing for the Russians' return, even the nobility of Vilnius participated in the digging of the defensive lines near the city. On July 19, the Russians attacked Vilnius The city was defended by 500 soldiers and 1,500 armed members of the municipal militia. The Russian army, commanded by General Gotthard Johann von Knorring, had some 8,000 soldiers, with several cannons. After two days of heavy fighting, Vilnius remained in the hands of the rebels.

On August 11, General von Knorring, whose forces had grown to 12,000 soldiers, initiated another assault on Vilnius. The city, whose defence was commanded by General Antoni Chlewiński, capitulated after one day.

== Legacy ==
The Vilnius Uprising is commemorated on the Tomb of the Unknown Soldier, Warsaw, with the inscription "WILNO 22 IV – 13 VIII 1794”.

== Notes ==
a. Sometimes sources refer to Lithuanians interchangeably with Poles due to the fact that Poland and Lithuania were both in the Polish–Lithuanian Commonwealth. Cases of this are in Wojsko Polskie Kościuszki w roku 1794 written by Bolesław Twardowski in 1894.

== Sources ==
=== In Polish ===
- Kukiel, Marian (1929). Zarys historii wojskowości w Polsce (in Polish). Kraków: Krakowska Spółka Wydawnicza. ISBN 0907587992.
- Twardowski, Bolesław (1894). Wojsko Polskie Kościuszki w roku 1794 (in Polish). Poznań: Księgarnia Katolicka. p. 49.

==== Wydawnictwo MON ====
- Grabski, Andrzej; Wimmer, Jan (1966). Zarys dziejów wojskowości polskiej do roku 1864 (in Polish). Warszawa: Wydawnictwo Ministerstwa Obrony Narodowej.
- Zahorski, Andrzej (1960). "Polska sztuka wojenna w okresie powstania kościuszkowskiego". Wypisy źródłowe do historii polskiej sztuki wojennej (in Polish). 10. Warszawa: Wydawnictwo Ministerstwa Obrony Narodowej.
