= Tomasz Wawrzecki =

Polish general (1753–1816)

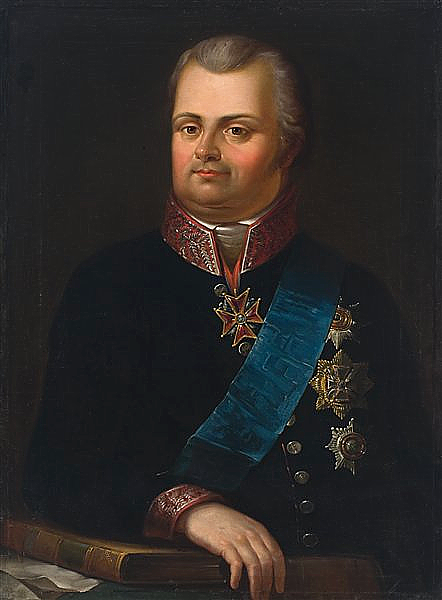
- Tomasz Wawrzecki, c. early 1800s
- Born: 7 March 1759; Meikštai, Grand Duchy of Lithuania, Polish–Lithuanian Commonwealth (now Lithuania)
- Died: 5 August 1816 (aged 57) Vidzy, Lithuania-Vilnius Governorate, Russian Empire (now Belarus)

Tomasz Antoni Wawrzecki (Lithuanian: Tomas Vavžeckis; 1753–1816) was a distinguished Polish–Lithuanian politician and military commander. During Kościuszko Uprising, he succeeded Tadeusz Kościuszko as the Supreme Commander of the National Armed Forces.

== Early life ==
Tomasz Wawrzecki was born in the Meikštai manor in 1754 or 7 March 1759. Wawrzecki was a judge in the Lithuanian Tribunal in 1778, 1782 and 1784.

== Great Sejm (1788–1792) ==
During the Four-Year Sejm, Wawrzecki belonged to the Patriotic Party. In 1790, in his manor in Kalviai near Kruonis, he replaced serfdom with contractual agreements.

On 17 May 1790, Wawrzecki, Matheus Butrymowicz, Jacek Jezierski and Ignacy Wyssogota Zakrzewski all condemned attacks against the Jewish population of Warsaw. Wawrziecki was of the opinion that Jews should have equal rights, however, this was motivated by the desire to make them socio-culturally resemble Poles more.

Together with others, Wawrziecki contributed to writing the Constitution of 3 May 1791 and also initiated the foundation of civilian and military administrative commissions. Wawrzecki was Grand Standard-bearer of Lithuania.

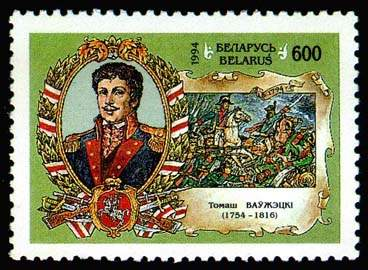
Tomasz Wawrzecki on a 1994 Belarusian stamp

== Kościuszko Uprising ==
During the Kościuszko Uprising of 1794, Wawrzecki was a member of the National Supreme Council of Lithuania and then the Supreme National Council. From 12 May to October 12, Wawrzecki commanded the Samogitian Division. In 1794, Wawrzecki gave his peasants personal freedom.

After Tadeusz Kościuszko was captured in the Battle of Maciejowice on October 10, lieutenant general Tomasz Wawrzecki was named his successor. From 12 October, Wawrzecki was the Supreme Commander of the National Armed Forces. After Warsaw was taken over by the Russian Empire following the Battle of Praga, he retreated with the remnants of his forces southwards. On November 18, Wawrzecki was taken prisoner by the Imperial Russian Army in Radoszyce. On November 22, the captured senior officers that signed an assurance that they would not fight against Catherine II of Russia were released, however Wawrzecki did not sign it and was thus sent to Saint Petersburg. Wawrzecki's surrender to the Imperial Russian Army on 16 November 1794 marked the effective end of the uprising. Wawrzecki was imprisoned in Petropavlovsk fortress in 1794, but was amnestied in 1796 by Paul I of Russia.

== Later life ==
In 1800, he and his wife were the initiators of building the Church of St. Anthony of Padua in Kalviai, whose building was completed and consecrated in 1806. In 1807, he replaced his peasants' corvée with quit-rent. Wawrzecki was the head of the second section of the Vilnius Charity Society that was established in 1807.

In March 1813, a Temporary Council for a new government in the Russian-conquered Duchy of Warsaw was created. It consisted of Tomasz Wawrzecki, Adam Jerzy Czartoryski, Nikolay Novosiltsev and Franciszek Ksawery Drucki-Lubecki. Wawrzecki was the chairman of the Commission of Justice of the Duchy of Warsaw in 1813–15. On 20 June 1815, when the Kingdom of Poland was re-created as a Russian puppet state, Wawrzecki delivered a speech praising Tsar Alexander I of Russia and Grand Duke Konstantin Pavlovich of Russia. Wawrzecki was the Justice minister of the Kingdom of Poland in 1815–16 and proposed that the Lithuanian Statutes should be the new law in the Kingdom of Poland, as he thought that the Lithuanian Statutes were better than the Napoleonic Code. Wawrzecki was part of conservative Lithuanian nobility that opposed keeping of the Napoleonic Code within Congress Poland. He died on 5 August 1816 in Vidzy, then part of the Russian Empire's Lithuania-Vilnius Governorate, but now in Belarus.

== Awards ==
- Order of Saint Stanislaus in 1786.
- Order of the White Eagle in 1791.

== Sources ==
- Jasas, Rimantas (2017). "Tomasz Wawrzecki". vle.lt (in Lithuanian).
- Pipiraitė, Asta, ed. (2009). Kas yra kas Lietuvoje: Kraštiečiai - Kaišiadorys (in Lithuanian). Kaunas: UAB „Neolitas“.
- Sužiedėlis, Saulius (2011). Historical Dictionary of Lithuania (2nd ed.). Scarecrow Press. ISBN 978-0-8108-7536-4.
