= Rybitwy, Lublin Voivodeship =

Rybitwy
- Village
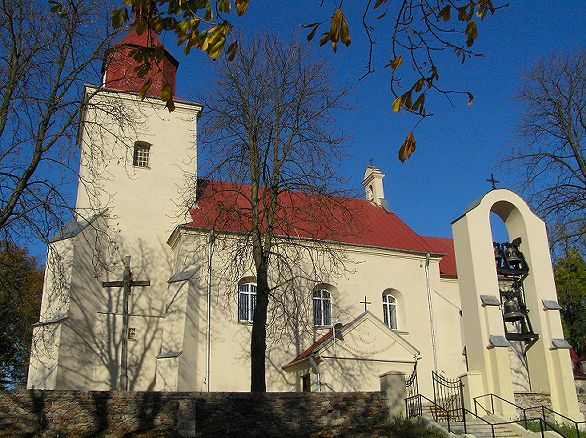
- Church of All Saints

- Location within Poland
- Coordinates: 51°2′N 21°51′E
- Country: Poland
- Voivodeship: Lublin
- County: Opole
- Gmina: Józefów nad Wisłą

Population
  - Total: 310

Rybitwy [rɨˈbitfɨ] is a village in the administrative district of Gmina Józefów nad Wisłą, within Opole County, Lublin Voivodeship, in eastern Poland.
