= Ignacy Działyński =

Polish noble

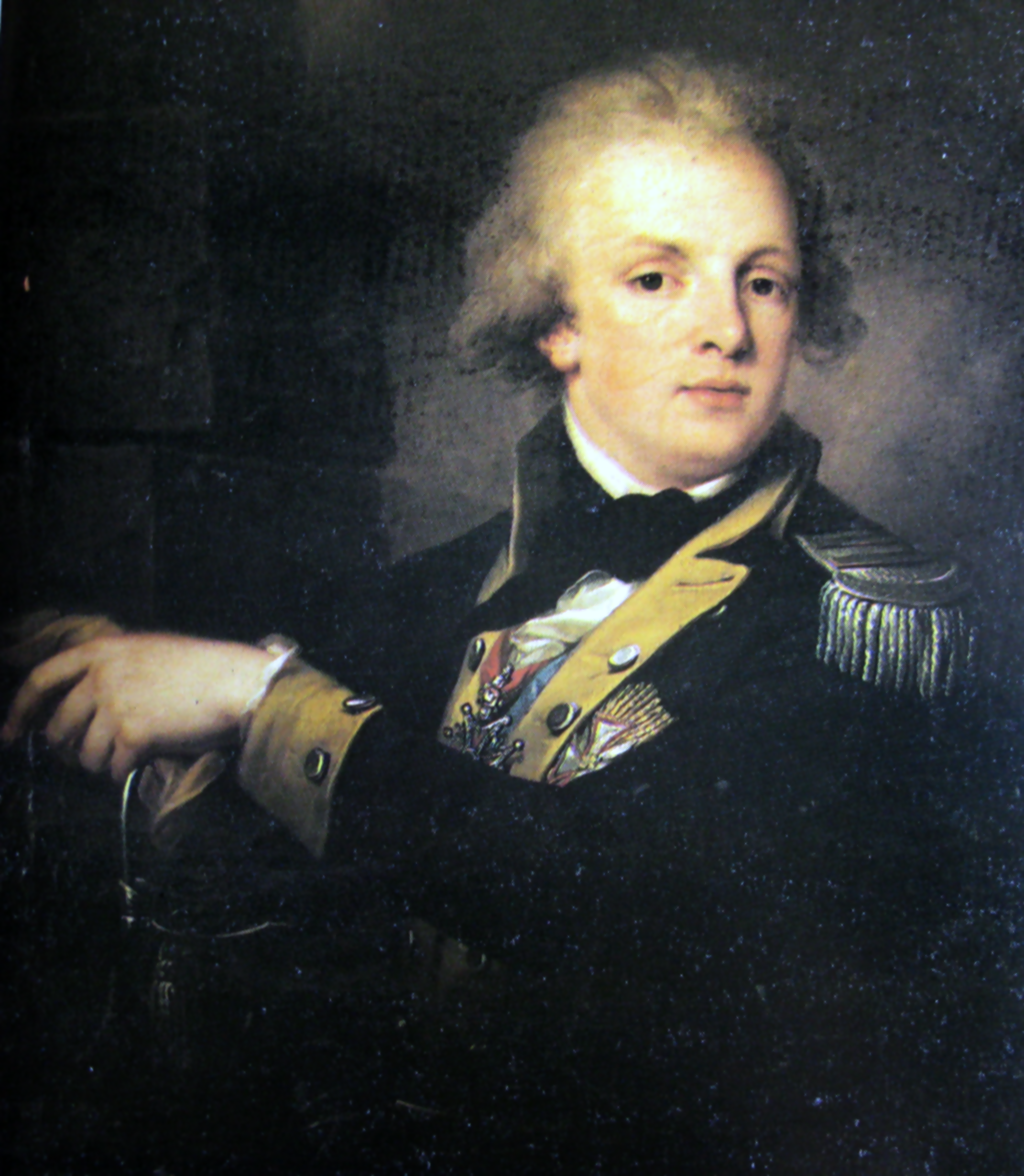
Ignacy Działyński

Ignacy Erazm Działyński (1754–1797) was a Polish nobleman (szlachcic) of Ogończyk coat of arms and a military officer, known for his participation in the Warsaw Uprising of 1794.

== Biography ==
Born in 1754 in Konarzewo near Poznań, he was the son of the Voivode of Kalisz Augustyn Radomiecki and his wife Anna. Orphaned early by his father, he was raised by his father-in-law, Great Lithuanian Marshal Władysaw Gótowski. Educated in the Jesuit school in Poznań and the Collegium Nobilium in Warsaw, in 1784 he married Szczęsna Woroniczówna, daughter of a Spaniard of Bełsk and owner of much land in Wołyń.

In 1780 he joined the Polish Army with the rank of Rotmistrz of Cavalry. On 23 December 1788 he bought from general Aleksander Mycielski the rank of General and the command of 10th Regiment of Foot. That regiment, known as the 'Radzyński Regiment' (of the Ordynacja Rydzyńska) under his command became known as 'Działyński Regiment'. He was a deputy for the famous Sejm Wielki, where together with Jan Kiliński he was one of the leaders of the 'moderate' faction, supporting the King Stanisław August Poniatowski, Polish Constitution of 3 May 1791, and advocating strengthening of the army, enfranchisement of the burghers and alliance with Revolutionary France. The following year together with his regiment he took part in the ill-fated War in Defense of the Constitution (Battle of Swisłocz, Battle of Zelwa on 4 July, Battle of Izabelin on 5 July, Battle of Piaski, Battle of Granne and Battle of Krzemień on 24 July).

Together with his unit he took a leading role in the Warsaw Uprising of 1794 during the early stages of the Kościuszko Uprising (17–19 April). Later he fought in the Battle of Biała, Battle of Nowe Miasto on 3 May, Battle of Chełm on 8 June, Battle of Kurów, Battle of Gołków on 9 July, Battle for Warsaw-Wola on 27 July and 28 August and the Battle of Maciejowice on 10 October.

He was preparing for the Uprising since 1793, and he continued his opposition to the Russians invasion and partitions of Poland by organising resistance in Wołyń until he was arrested in 1794 and sentenced to exile to Berezowo in Siberia.

Freemason. Received Order of the White Eagle (1791) and Order of Saint Stanislaus.
