= 1835 =

1835 in various calendars
- Gregorian calendar: 1835; MDCCCXXXV
- Ab urbe condita: 2588
- Armenian calendar: 1284; ԹՎ ՌՄՁԴ
- Assyrian calendar: 6585
- Balinese saka calendar: 1756–1757
- Bengali calendar: 1241–1242
- Berber calendar: 2785
- British Regnal year: 5 Will. 4 – 6 Will. 4
- Buddhist calendar: 2379
- Burmese calendar: 1197
- Byzantine calendar: 7343–7344
- Chinese calendar: 甲午年 (Wood Horse); 4532 or 4325 — to — 乙未年 (Wood Goat); 4533 or 4326
- Coptic calendar: 1551–1552
- Discordian calendar: 3001
- Ethiopian calendar: 1827–1828
- Hebrew calendar: 5595–5596
- Hindu calendars
- Vikram Samvat: 1891–1892
- Shaka Samvat: 1756–1757
- Kali Yuga: 4935–4936
- Holocene calendar: 11835
- Igbo calendar: 835–836
- Iranian calendar: 1213–1214
- Islamic calendar: 1250–1251
- Japanese calendar: Tenpō 6 (天保６年)
- Javanese calendar: 1762–1763
- Julian calendar: Gregorian minus 12 days
- Korean calendar: 4168
- Minguo calendar: 77 before ROC 民前77年
- Nanakshahi calendar: 367
- Thai solar calendar: 2377–2378
- Tibetan calendar: ཤིང་ཕོ་རྟ་ལོ་ (male Wood-Horse); 1961 or 1580 or 808 — to — ཤིང་མོ་ལུག་ལོ་ (female Wood-Sheep); 1962 or 1581 or 809

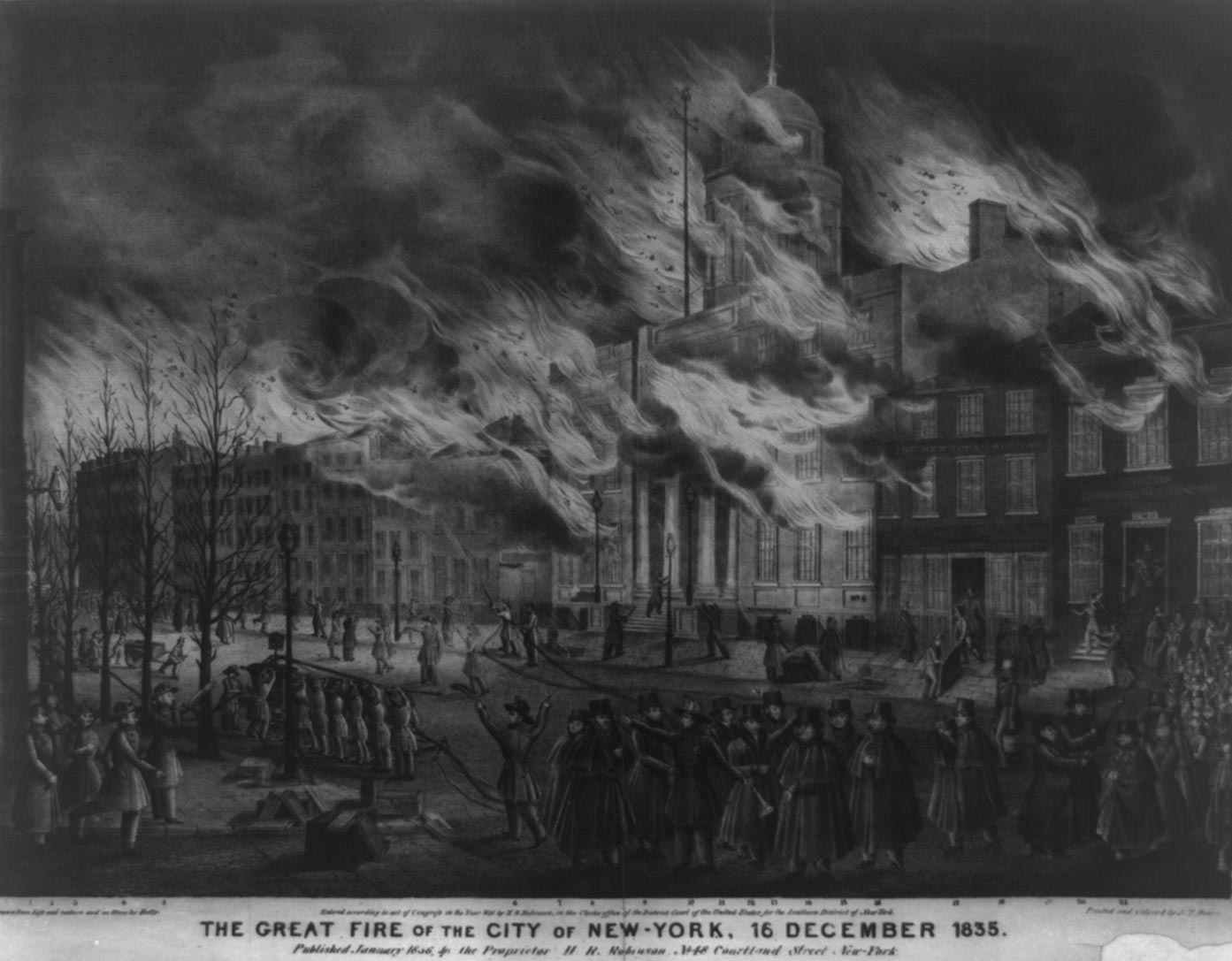
December 16: The Great Fire of New York destroys 17 blocks of businesses in Manhattan, including the New York Stock Exchange.

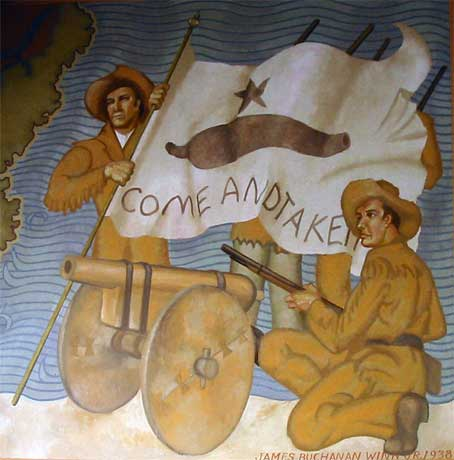
October 2: The Texas Revolution starts in Mexico at the American settlement of Gonzalez.

1835 (MDCCCXXXV) was a common year starting on Thursday of the Gregorian calendar and a common year starting on Tuesday of the Julian calendar, the 1835th year of the Common Era (CE) and Anno Domini (AD) designations, the 835th year of the 2nd millennium, the 35th year of the 19th century, and the 6th year of the 1830s decade. As of the start of 1835, the Gregorian calendar was 12 days ahead of the Julian calendar, which remained in localized use until 1923.

== Events ==
=== January–March ===
- January 7 – HMS Beagle anchors off the Chonos Archipelago on her second voyage, with Charles Darwin on board as a scientist.
- January 8 – The United States public debt contracts to zero, for the only time in history.
- January 24 – Malê Revolt: African slaves of Yoruba Muslim origin revolt against Brazilian owners at Salvador, Bahia.
- January 26
  - Queen Maria II of Portugal marries Auguste de Beauharnais, 2nd Duke of Leuchtenberg, in Lisbon; he dies only two months later.
  - Saint Paul's in Macau is largely destroyed by fire after a typhoon hits.
- January 30 – Attempted assassination of Andrew Jackson: The first assassination attempt against a President of the United States is carried out against President Andrew Jackson at the United States Capitol in Washington, D.C., by English-born delusional unemployed house painter Richard Lawrence; the attempt fails when his pistols misfire due to humidity.
- February 1 – Slavery is finally abolished in British-administered Mauritius, with compensation to slaveowners.
- February 20 – 1835 Concepción earthquake: Concepción, Chile, is destroyed by an earthquake. The resulting tsunami destroys the neighboring city of Talcahuano.
- March 2 – Ferdinand becomes Emperor of Austria.
- March 23 – The Academia Mexicana de la Lengua (Mexican Academy of Language) is established.

=== April–June ===
- April 18 – Lord Melbourne succeeds Sir Robert Peel as Prime Minister of the United Kingdom.
- May 5
  - The first railway in continental Europe is opened between Brussels and Mechelen in Belgium.
  - Braulio Carrillo is sworn in as Head of State of Costa Rica.
- May 8 – Hans Christian Andersen's Fairy Tales Told for Children. First Collection. is first published.
- May 11 – Matua, High Priest (taura tupua) of the Polynesian island of Mangareva, is baptized into the Roman Catholic Church.
- May 13 – At least 224 people, most of them female convicts being transported from Cork, Ireland, to Australia, are drowned when the British barque Neva is wrecked in the Bass Strait. Only 15 people survive.
- May 23 – The Mexican State of Aguascalientes is formed, by decree of President Antonio López de Santa Anna.
- June 1 – Kingston Penitentiary opens in Kingston, Ontario.

=== July–September ===
- July 14 – The universal Catholic Apostolic Church is organized, initially in the U.K.
- July 25 – James Bowman Lindsay demonstrates a constant electric light at a public meeting in Dundee, Scotland.
- July 28 – An assassination attempt against King Louis Philippe I of France is attempted by Giuseppe Marco Fieschi, who uses a home-made volley gun and kills 10 people. The King escapes with a minor wound.
- July – The Bertelsmann company is founded by Carl Bertelsmann as a religious printer and publisher in Prussia.
- August 25 – In the U.S., The New York Sun prints the first of six installments of the Great Moon Hoax.
- August 28 – St. Vincent's Ecclesiastical Seminary, a predecessor of Castleknock College, is founded by the Vincentian community in Dublin, Ireland.
- August 30 – European settlers, landing on the north banks of the Yarra River in Victoria, Australia, found the settlement of Melbourne.
- August – H. Fox Talbot exposes the world's first known photographic negatives, at Lacock Abbey in England.
- September 7 – Charles Darwin arrives at the Galápagos Islands, aboard HMS Beagle.
- September 19 – William Lloyd Garrison publishes Angelina Grimké's anti-slavery letter in The Liberator.
- September 20 – The Ragamuffin War begins in Rio Grande do Sul, Brazil.

=== October–December ===
- October 2 – The Texas Revolution – Battle of Gonzales: Mexican soldiers attempt to disarm the people of Gonzales, Texas, but encounter stiff resistance from a hastily assembled militia.
- October 3 – The Staedtler Company (pencil manufacturers) is founded by J. S. Staedtler in Nuremberg, Germany.
- October 28
  - The United Tribes of New Zealand is founded at Waitangi, with the Declaration of the Independence of New Zealand.
  - Texas Revolution – Battle of Concepción: The Texian Army defeats the Mexicans.
- November 12 – Construction is completed on the Wilberforce Monument in Kingston Upon Hull.
- November 16 – Halley's Comet reaches perihelion, its closest approach to the Sun.
- November 27 – Two London men, James Pratt and John Smith, are hanged in front of Newgate Prison in London, after a conviction of buggery. They are the last to suffer capital punishment for homosexual acts in England.
- December 5 – Start of Moriori genocide, the killing and enslavement of the indigenous people of the Chatham Islands by 500 Māori people from New Zealand.
- December 7
  - The Bavarian Ludwig Railway opens between Nuremberg and Fürth, with a train hauled by the English-built Der Adler ("The Eagle"), the first railway in Germany.
  - Future U.S. President James K. Polk becomes Speaker of the United States House of Representatives.
- December 9 – The Army of the Republic of Texas captures San Antonio.
- December 16– The Great Fire of New York begins and lasts until the next day, destroying 530 buildings, including the New York Stock Exchange.
- December 20 – The Texas Declaration of Independence is signed by American residents rebelling against Mexico at Goliad, Texas.
- December 21 – The Raleigh and Gaston Railroad is chartered in Raleigh, North Carolina.
- December 28 — The Second Seminole War, led by Seminole Chief Osceola breaks out in the U.S. state of Florida.
- December 29 – The Treaty of New Echota is signed between the United States Government and representatives of the Cherokee Nation.

=== Date unknown ===
- The British East India Company negotiates a lease of the Darjeeling area west of the Mahananda River, from the Kingdom of Sikkim.
- The British Geological Survey is founded, as the world's first national geological survey.
- Civil war erupts in Uruguay, between supporters of the Blanco and Colorado parties.
- The Cachar Levy, forerunner of the Assam Rifles, is founded in India.
- The first Bulgarian-language school opens in the Ottoman Empire.
- The French word for their language changes to français, from françois.
- Fort Cass is established, the military headquarters and site of the largest internment camps during the 1838 Trail of Tears.
- Charles-Louis Havas creates Havas, the first news agency in the world (which later spawns Agence France-Presse).
- English becomes the official language of India.
- Juan Manuel de Rosas becomes Caudillo of Argentina.
- Edward Strutt Abdy publishes his Journal of a Residence and Tour in the United States of North America: From April, 1833, to October 1834.
- David Strauss begins publication of Das Leben Jessu, kritisch bearbeitet ("The life of Jesus, critically examined") in Tübingen.
- The first Egyptian Museum in Cairo opened.

== Births ==
=== January–June ===
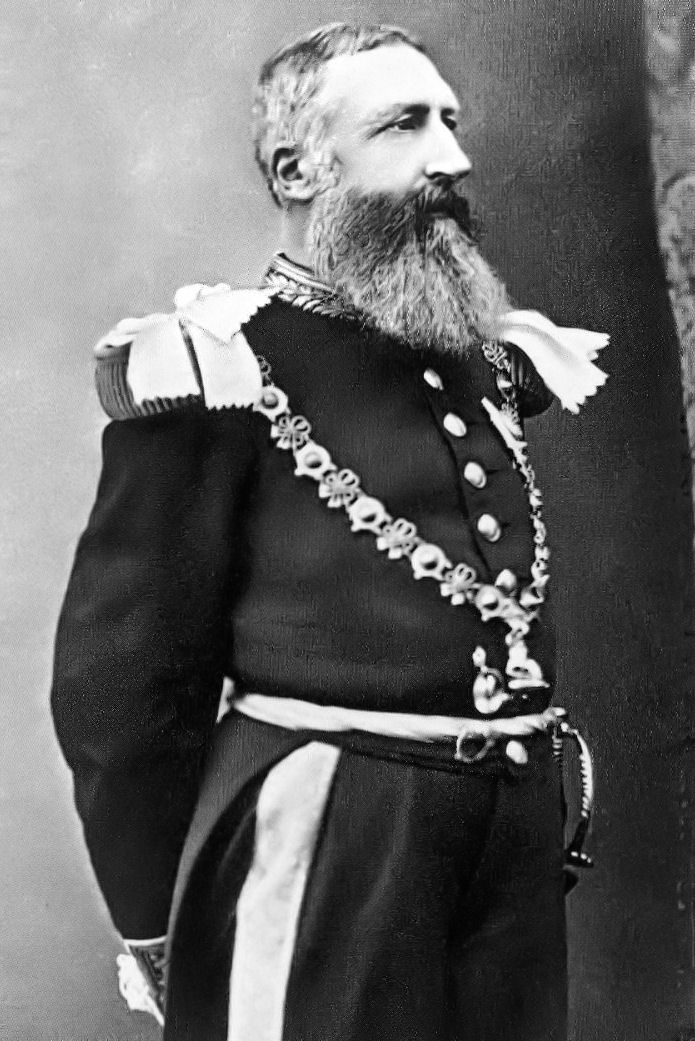
Leopold II of Belgium

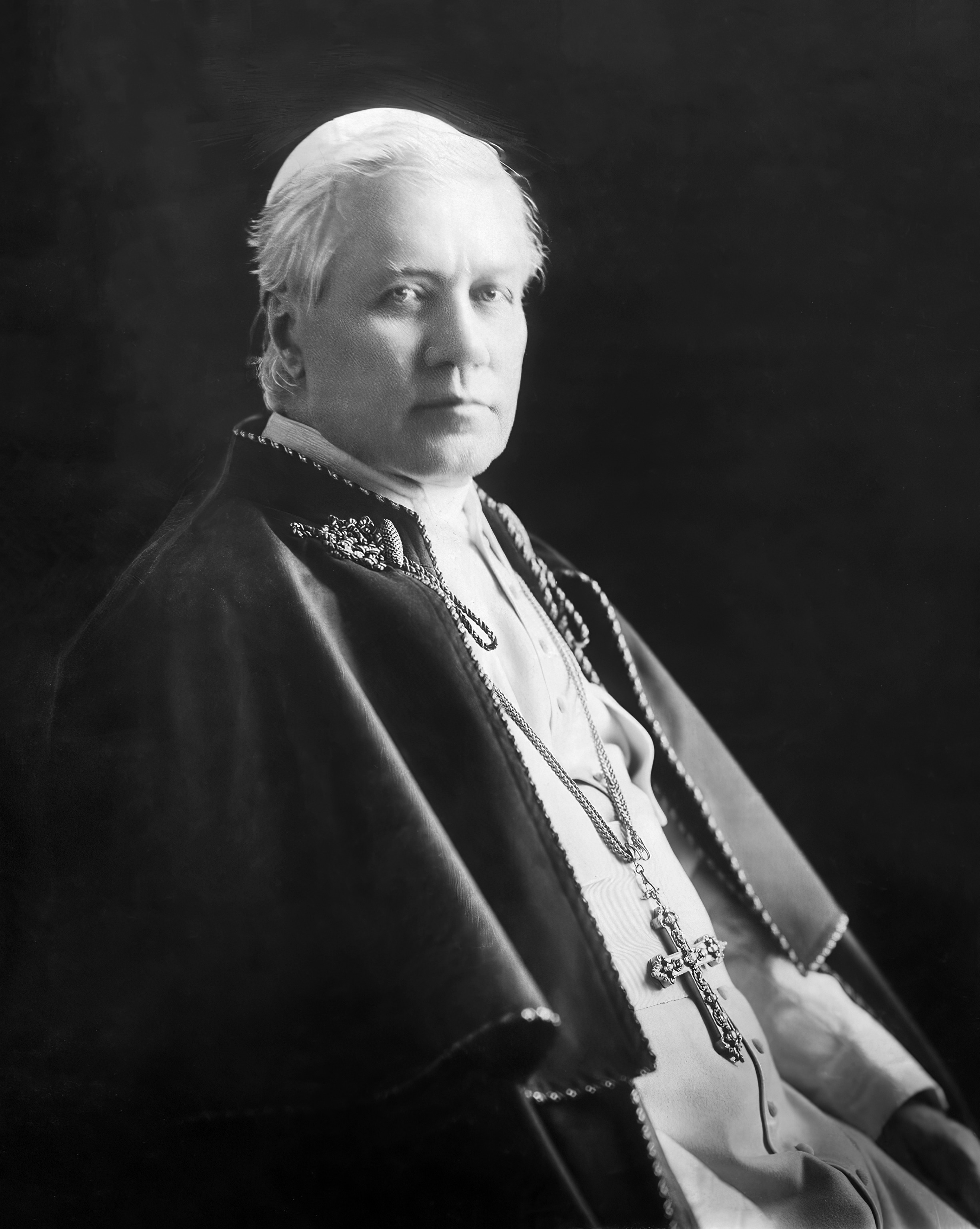
Pope Pius X

- January 14 – Emmy Rappe, Swedish nurse pioneer (d. 1896)
- February 13 – Mirza Ghulam Ahmad, founder of the Ahmadiyya Muslim Community (d. 1908)
- February 15
  - Demetrius Vikelas, Greek International Olympic Committee president (d. 1908)
  - Nguyễn Khuyến, Vietnamese Ruist scholar, poet and teacher (d. 1910)
- February 18 – César Cui, Lithuanian composer (d. 1918)
- February 22 – Jeannette Walworth, American novelist, journalist (d. 1918)
- March 12
  - Simon Newcomb, Canadian-American astronomer (d. 1909)
  - Sigismondo Savona, Maltese educator and politician (d. 1908)
- March 14 – Giovanni Schiaparelli, Italian astronomer (d. 1910)
- March 15 – Eduard Strauss, Austrian composer (d. 1916)
- March 21 – Maria Magdalena Mathsdotter, Swedish Sami educator (d. 1873)
- March 24 – Josef Stefan, Slovenian physicist, mathematician, and poet (d. 1893)
- April 1 – James Fisk, American entrepreneur (d. 1872)
- April 4 – John Hughlings Jackson, English neurologist (d. 1911)
- April 9 – King Leopold II of Belgium (d. 1909)
- May 3 – Alfred Austin, English poet (d. 1913)
- May 18 – Charles N. Sims, American Methodist preacher, third chancellor of Syracuse University (d. 1908)
- May 21 – František Chvostek, Moravian physician (d. 1884)
- June 2 – Pope Pius X (d. 1914)
- June 6 – Ștefan Fălcoianu, Romanian general and politician (d. 1905)
- June 9 – Ramón Barros Luco, 15th President of Chile (d. 1919)
- June 10 – Ferdinand IV, Grand Duke of Tuscany, (d. 1908)
- June 12 – George Atzerodt, conspirator with John Wilkes Booth, assigned to assassinate Vice President Andrew Johnson (d. 1865)
- June 15 – Adah Isaacs Menken, American actress (d. 1868)
- June 23 – Fanny Eaton, Jamaican-born artists model and domestic worker (d. 1924)
- June 24 – Johannes Wislicenus, German chemist (d. 1902)
- June 26 – Thomas W. Knox, American author, journalist (d. 1896)

=== July–December ===
Adolf von Baeyer

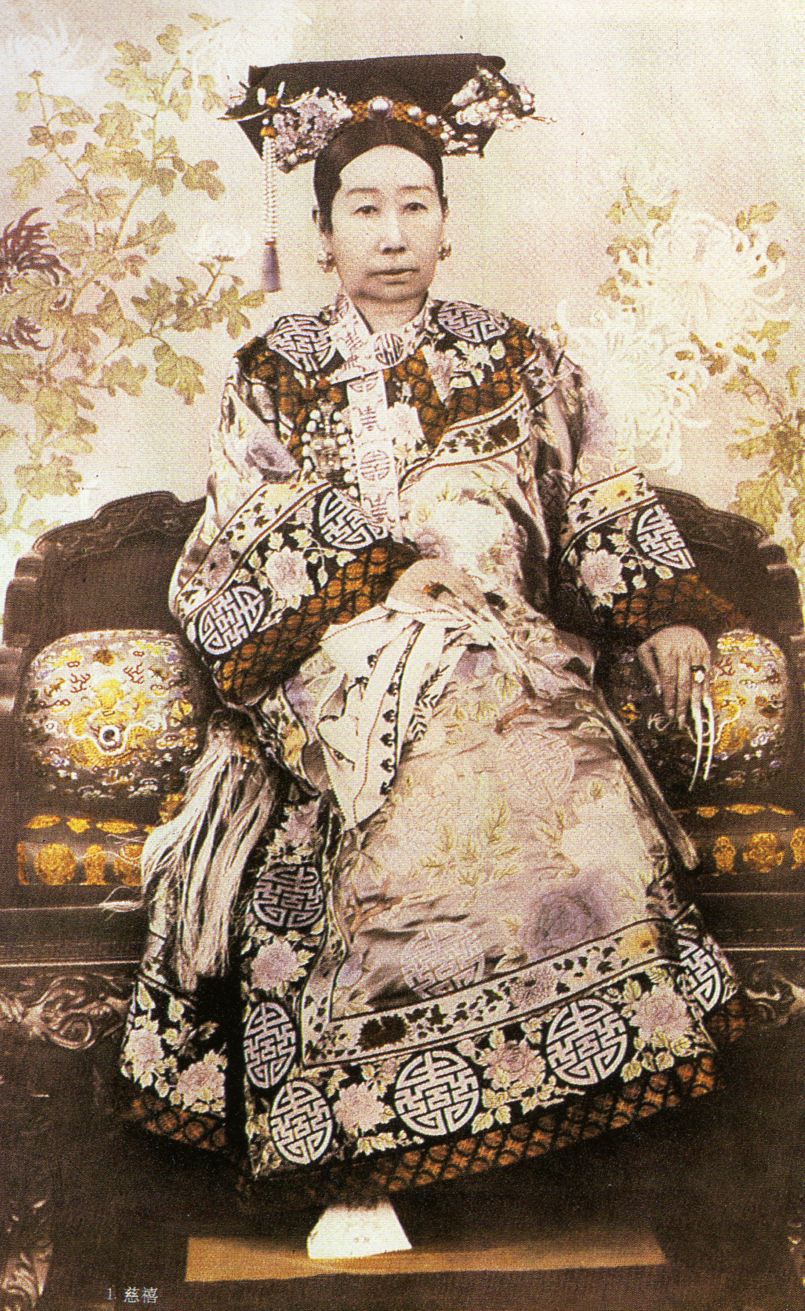
Empress Dowager Cixi

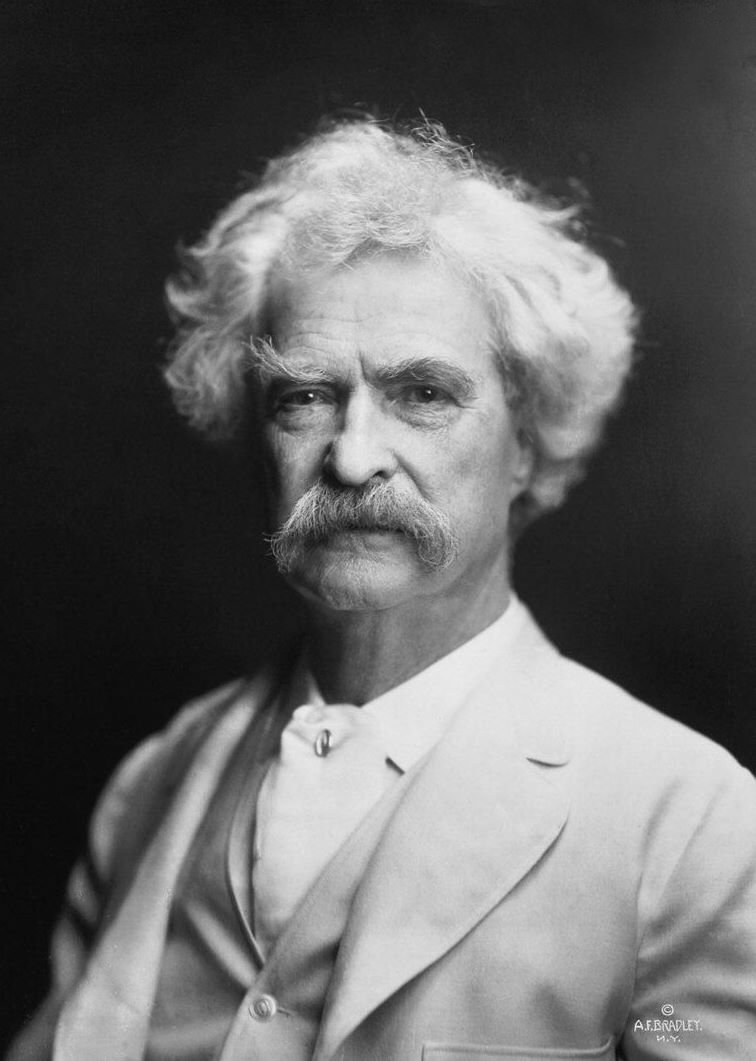
Mark Twain

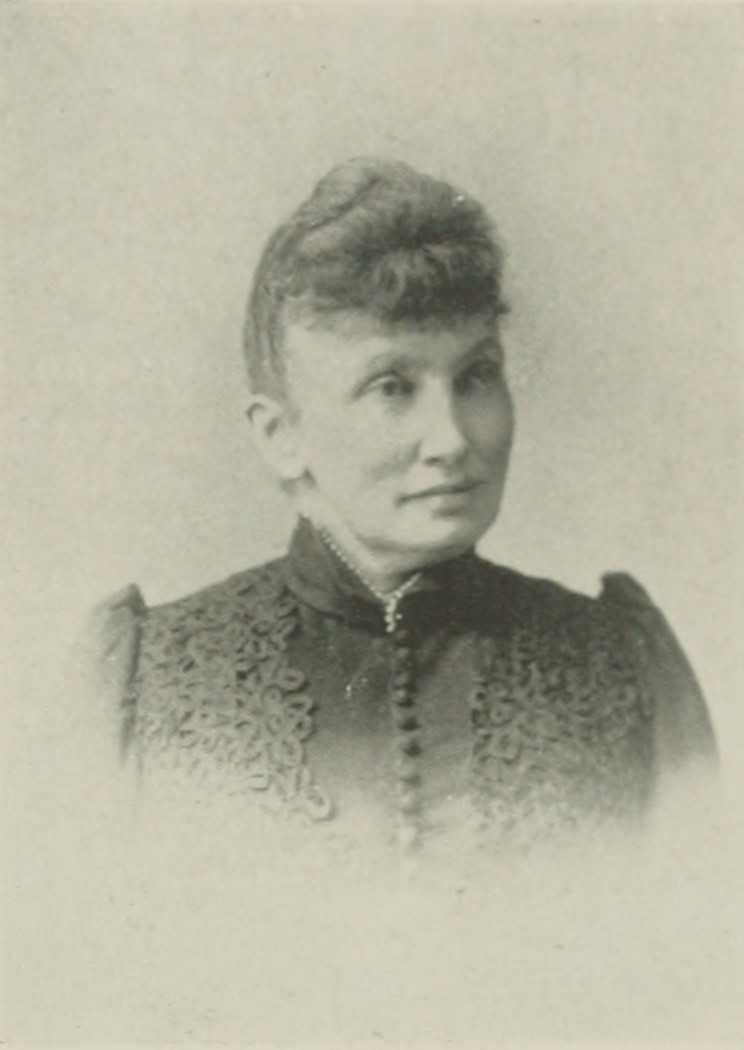
Matilda Carse

- July 6 – Sir George White, British field marshal (d. 1912)
- July 7 – Ernest Giles, Australian explorer (d. 1897)
- July 10 – Henryk Wieniawski, Polish composer (d. 1880)
- July 19 – Justo Rufino Barrios, 9th President of Guatemala (d. 1885)
- July 27 – Giosuè Carducci, Italian writer, Nobel Prize laureate (d. 1907)
- July 30 – Edmund Francis Dunne, American politician, jurist, and Catholic orator (d. 1904)
- July 31 – Henri Brisson, 2-time prime minister of France (d. 1912)
- August 2 – Elisha Gray, American inventor, businessman (d. 1901)
- August 6 – Hjalmar Kiærskou, Danish botanist (d. 1900)
- August 19 – Tom Wills, Australian cricketer, pioneer of Australian rules football (d. 1880)
- August 27 – Thomas Burberry, English businessman, inventor (d. 1926)
- September 1 – Raphael Kalinowski, Polish Discalced Carmelite friar, saint (d. 1907)
- October 7 – Felix Draeseke, German composer (d. 1913)
- October 9 – Camille Saint-Saëns, French composer (d. 1921)
- October 16 – William Rufus Shafter, American general (d. 1906)
- October 23 – Adlai Stevenson I, American lawyer and politician, 23rd Vice President of the United States (d. 1914)
- October 31 – Adolf von Baeyer, German chemist, Nobel Prize laureate (d. 1917)
- November 6 – Cesare Lombroso, Italian criminologist (d. 1909)
- November 17 – Andrew L. Harris, American Civil War hero, Governor of Ohio (d. 1915)
- November 19 – Matilda Carse, Irish-born American businesswoman, social reformer (d. 1917)
- November 21 – Rose Eytinge, American actress (d. 1911)
- November 25
  - Andrew Carnegie, American industrialist, philanthropist (d. 1919)
  - Arthur Sewall, American politician, industrialist (d. 1900)
- November 29 – Empress Dowager Cixi of China (d. 1908)
- November 30 – Mark Twain, American author, humorist (d. 1910)
- December 4 – Samuel Butler, English writer (d. 1902)
- December 6 – Wilhelm Rudolph Fittig, German chemist (d. 1910)
- December 17 – Alexander Emanuel Agassiz, American scientist (d. 1910)
- December 18 – Lyman Abbott, American clergyman, author (d. 1922)
- December 28 – Sir Archibald Geikie, Scottish geologist (d. 1924)

== Deaths ==
=== January–June ===
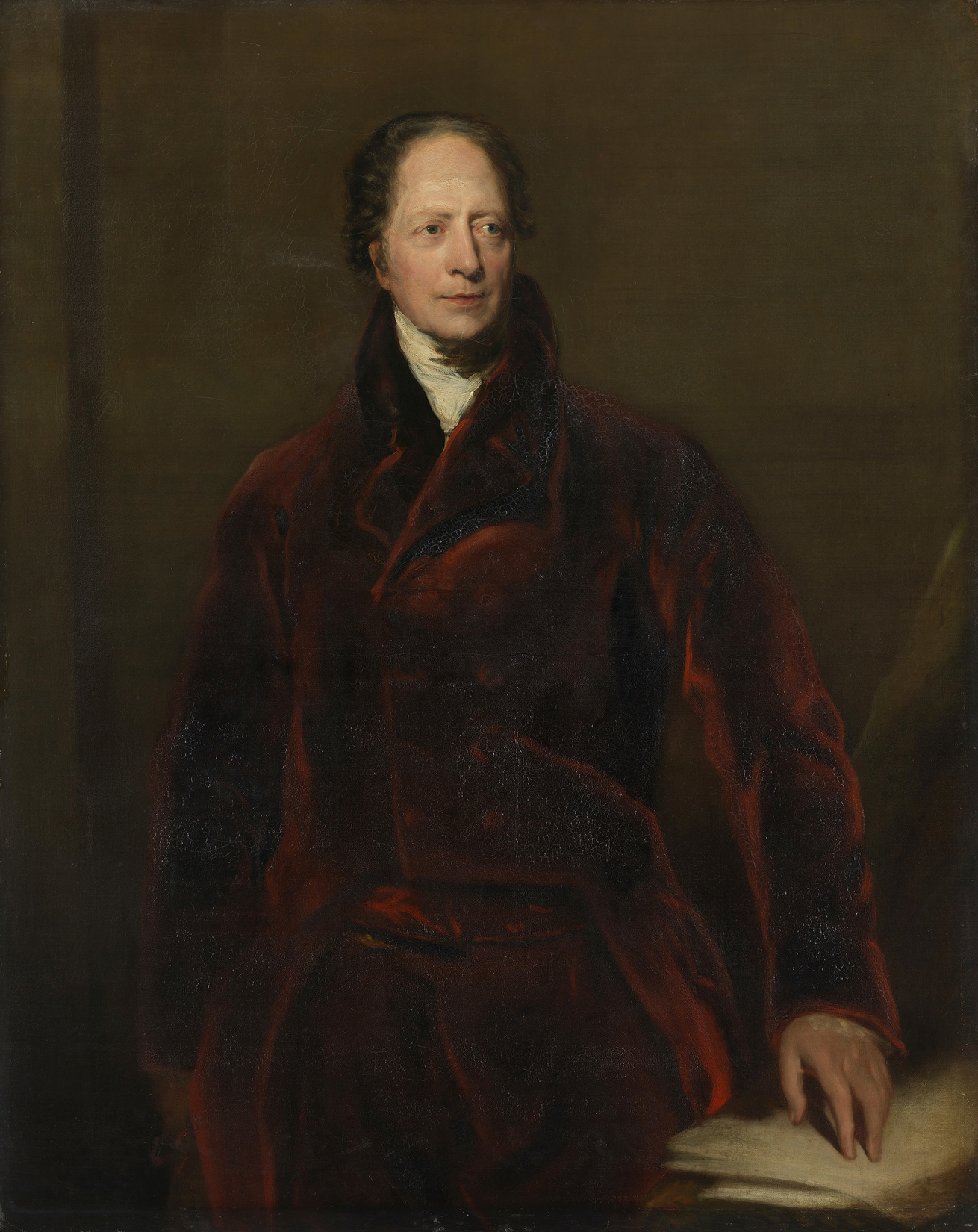
Wilhelm von Humboldt

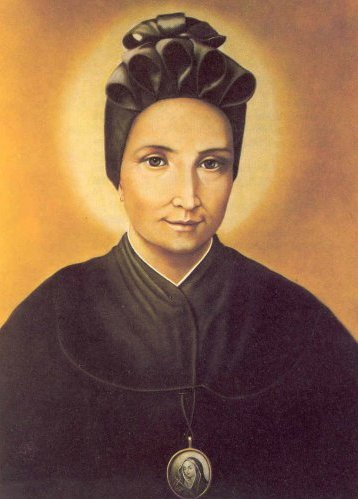
Saint Magdalene of Canossa

- January 1 – Mátyás Godina, Slovene Lutheran pastor, writer, and teacher (b. 1768)
- February 8 – Guillaume Dupuytren, French anatomist, military surgeon (b. 1777)
- February 15
  - Nathan Dane, American politician (b. 1752)
  - Henry Hunt, British politician (b. 1773)
- March 2 – Francis II, Holy Roman Emperor (b. 1768)
- March 18 – Christian Günther von Bernstorff, Danish, Prussian statesman, diplomat (b. 1769)
- March 28 – Auguste de Beauharnais, Prince consort of Queen Maria II of Portugal (b. 1810)
- March 30 – Richard Sharp, English hat-maker, banker, merchant, poet, critic, Member of Parliament, and conversationalist
- April 1 – Józef Zeydlitz, Polish military leader (b. 1755)
- April 8 – Wilhelm von Humboldt, German linguist, philosopher (b. 1767)
- April 10 – Magdalene of Canossa, Italian Catholic religious professed, saint (b. 1774)
- April 21 – Samuel Slater, American industrialist (b. 1768)
- May 8 – Francisca Zubiaga y Bernales, first lady of Peru, controversial socialite (b. 1803)
- May 13 – John Nash, English architect (b. 1752)
- June 18 – William Cobbett, English journalist, author (b. 1763)
- June 24 – Andreas Vokos Miaoulis, Greek admiral (b. 1768)
- June 25 – Ebenezer Pemberton, American educator (b. 1746)

=== July–December ===
- July 6 – John Marshall, influential American Chief Justice of the United States Supreme Court (b. 1755)
- July 15 – Izabela Czartoryska, Polish magnate princess (b. 1746)
- July 28 – Édouard Mortier, Duke of Trévise, French marshal (b. 1768)
- August 18 – Friedrich Stromeyer, German chemist (born 1776)
- September 23
  - Georg Adlersparre, Swedish military leader (b. 1760)
  - Vincenzo Bellini, Italian composer (b. 1801)
- November 14 – James Freeman, first American clergyman to call himself a Unitarian (b. 1759)
- November 20 – Joseph von Baader, German railway pioneer (b. 1763)
- November 29 – Princess Catharina of Württemberg, wife of Jérôme Bonaparte (b. 1783)
- December 17 – Pierre Louis Roederer, French politician, economist, and historian (b. 1754)
- December 22 – David Hosack, American physician and educator, attending doctor at the Hamilton-Burr duel (b. 1769)

=== Unknown ===
- Sally Hemings – American-born slave, concubine to Thomas Jefferson (b. c. 1773)
- Ishak Efendi – Ottoman engineer, translator (b. c. 1774)
