= Michał Chomentowski =

Polish military commander

Michał Chomentowski (died 1794) was a Polish military commander and a decorated officer - he was one of the first recipients of the Virtuti Militari Knight's Cross - of the Polish Army. As the commander of Warsaw's garrison, he took part in the successful Warsaw Uprising (1794). Following the liberation of Warsaw he joined the forces of the Kościuszko's Uprising and commanded the artillery of Józef Zajączek's Corps in the rank of Major. He was killed in the Battle of Chełm of June 8, 1794.
