= General Poniatowski =

General Poniatowski may refer to:

- Andrzej Poniatowski (1734/5–1773), Polish general in Austrian service
- Dionizy Poniatowski (1750–1811), Polish Army major general
- Józef Poniatowski (1763–1813), Polish general who became a Marshal of the French Empire
- Kazimierz Poniatowski (1721–1800), Polish Army lieutenant general
- Stanisław Poniatowski (1676–1762) (1676–1762), Polish–Lithuanian Commonwealth general
