= Aleksander Mycielski =

- Born: 1760
- Died: 1818
- Allegiance: Polish–Lithuanian Commonwealth
- Service / branch: Polish–Lithuanian Army
- Commands: 10th Regiment of Foot
- Battles / wars: Kościuszko Uprising

Aleksander Mycielski (born 1760) was a Polish commander of the 10th Regiment of Foot.

His most notable years were between (1786–1788). Together with his unit he took a role in the Warsaw Uprising of 1794 during the early stages of the Kościuszko Uprising (April 17–19). Later he fought in the Battle of Biała, Battle of Nowe Miasto on 3 May, Battle of Chełm on 8 June, Battle of Kurów, Battle of Gołków on 9 July, Battle for Warsaw-Wola on 27 July and 28 August and the Battle of Maciejowice on 10 October.

He was later killed in 1818 whilst still serving in the Regiment.
