= Józef Zeydlitz =

Polish military commander (1755–1835)

Józef Zeydlitz (19 March 1755 – 1 April 1835) (his name also rendered Seydlitz or Zejdlicz) was a Polish military commander and a colonel of the Polish Army.

== Early life ==
Zeydlitz was born on 19 March 1755 in Chłapów near Kalisz, to Jan Zeydlitz and Kunegunda née Białoskórska.

== Kingdom of Poland ==
On 1 September 1770, he joined the Cadet Corps of the Crown Army. In 1776, he became a chorąży in August Sułkowski's 10th Regiment of Foot. He quickly rose through the ranks, partially thanks to his family's wealth. In 1786, he held the rank of staff captain. In 1791, he was involved in a conflict between his superior and a foreigner, which resulted in Zeydlitz being arrested and imprisoned for half a year for falsely accusing the foreigner. However, soon after his term ended he returned to his unit and took part in the War of 1792.

In 1793, he joined the Revolutionary Association and promoted its aims among his fellow officers.

=== Kościuszko Uprising ===
After the outbreak of the Warsaw Uprising of 1794, he led his regiment in the city fights and formally replaced the former commander Filip Hauman soon afterwards. On May 20, he was promoted to the rank of Colonel and became the regiment's commander. With it he took part in the Kościuszko Uprising, fighting in the ranks of the Corps of Gen. Józef Zajączek. After the battle of Chełm his regiment shielded the retreat of the Polish units towards Warsaw. In the battle of Maciejowice, Zeydlitz's regiment fought valiantly against the numerically superior Russian forces and held its positions but at the expense of tremendous losses. The regiment practically ceased to exist, and Zeydlitz was taken prisoner.

== Polish Legions ==
Set free in 1797, he returned to Russia and was then settled in Volhynia, where he founded a secret resistance association, aiming at the removal of Russian forces occupying most of Poland in the aftermath of the partitions. However, the Russians discovered the plot and Zeydlitz had to flee for Saxony, together with Cyprian Godebski. In Dresden he became one of the associates of Gen. Romualdas Giedraitis, who recommended him for service in the Polish Legions in Italy. On 20 May 1798. Gen. Jan Henryk Dąbrowski nominated him to the post of the commanding officer of the 1st Legion's 3rd Battalion. He took part in French operations in Italy but was dismissed on May 18 of the following year, after his soldiers refused to fight against Italian freedom fighters.

Dispatched to the newly formed Danube Legion under Gen. Karol Kniaziewicz, Zeydlitz became the commander of the 3rd Battalion of that unit, formally attached to the French 5th Military Division (French: 5ème division militaire). However, as the Legion was never fully formed and was disbanded in 1801, Zeydlitz was attached to a cavalry regiment of Col. Rożniecki. With that unit, he returned to Italy, where he took part in the War of the Third Coalition.

== Army of the Duchy of Warsaw ==
Dispatched to Poland, he arrived in Warsaw where Prince Józef Poniatowski accepted him into the Army of the Duchy of Warsaw and to a new corps formed under the command of Gen. Zajączek. He took part in several skirmishes, as well as took part in the formation of several cavalry units. On 12 May 1808, Marshal Louis-Nicolas Davout promoted Zeydlitz to the rank of commander of the garrison of Kostrzyń (de facto General), and the following year Zeydlitz decided to retire from the army. However, soon afterwards the Polish–Austrian War broke out and he remained in active service as the commanding officer of Łęczyca. Taken prisoner by the Austrians in August 1813, he was released the following year and returned to Warsaw. There he became the commander of the Veteran Corps and organized the return of Polish war veterans from France.

== Concert of Europe ==
On 18 December 1830 he was awarded a commemorative medal for 50 years in active service, as the first Polish officer ever. However, as for most of his career, he served on various staff positions rather than as a front-line officer in major battles, he was never awarded any high-ranking military award. He continued to serve as the commander of the Veteran and War Invalids Corps even during and after the November Uprising. He died in Warsaw on 1 April 1835.
