= Warsaw Uprising (1794) =

Armed uprising by Polish forces against the Russian garrison of Warsaw in 1794

Coordinates: 52°13′48″N 21°00′39″E

Warsaw Uprising of 1794
- Part of the Kościuszko Uprising
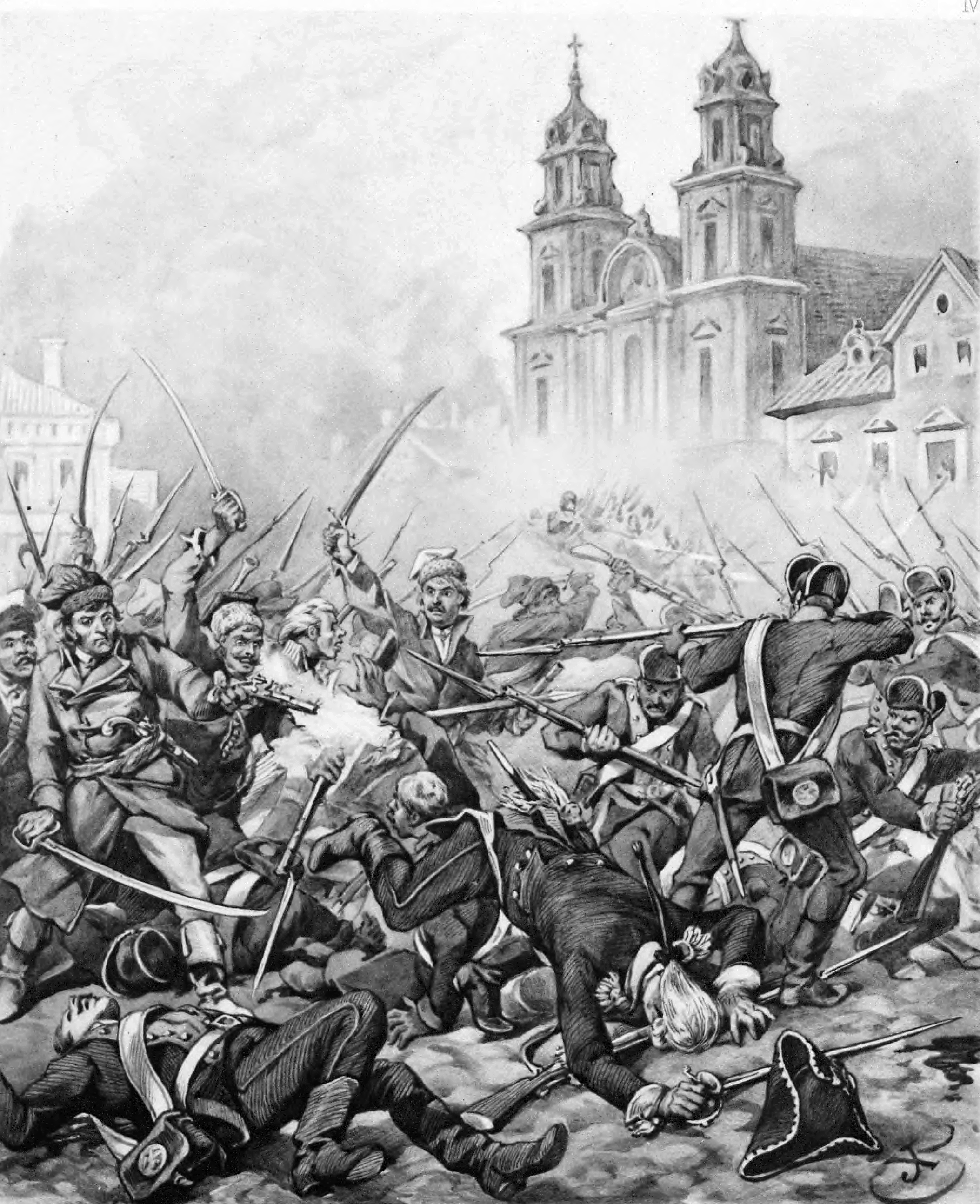
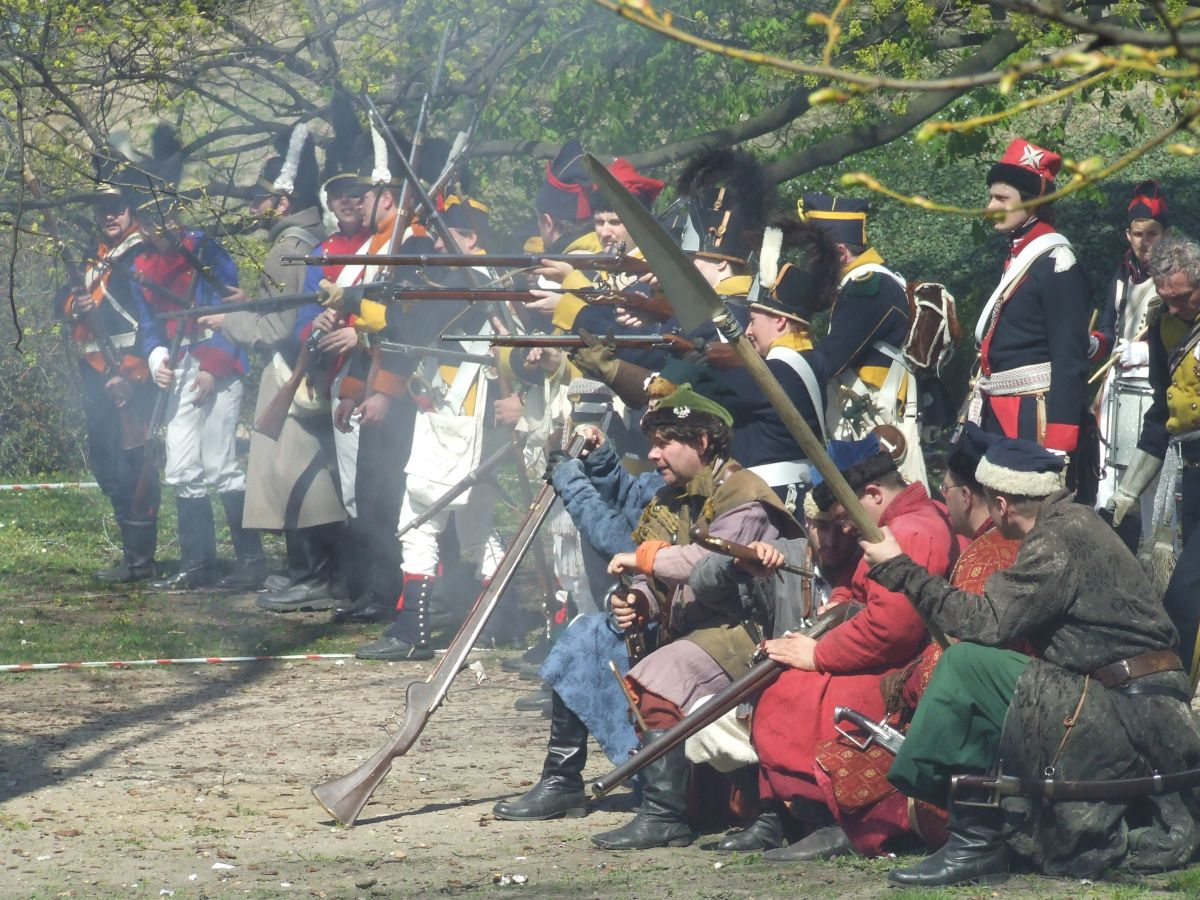
- Fighting on Krakowskie Przedmieście by Juliusz Kossak (top); Historical reconstruction in the Saxon Garden (bottom)
Date	17 to 19 April 1794
Location	Warsaw, Poland
Result	Polish victory

Belligerents
Poland-Lithuania	Russian Empire

Commanders and leaders
Stanisław Mokronowski; Jan Kiliński	(Russian Empire) Iosif Igelström

Strength
3,000–3,500 soldiers, ~2,500 militia^{[1]}	8,000 soldiers^{[1]}

Casualties and losses
507 soldiers killed and 437 wounded, ~700 militias and civilians killed	2,000 or 2,250 to 4,000 killed 1,500 to 2,000 taken prisoner

The Warsaw Uprising of 1794 or Warsaw Insurrection (Polish: insurekcja warszawska) was an armed insurrection by the people of Warsaw early in the Kościuszko Uprising. Supported by the Polish Army, the uprising aimed to throw off control by the Russian Empire of the Polish capital city (Warsaw). It began on 17 April 1794, soon after Tadeusz Kościuszko's victory at the Battle of Racławice.

Although the Russian forces had more soldiers and better equipment, the Polish regular forces and militia, armed with rifles and sabres from the Warsaw Arsenal, inflicted heavy losses on the surprised enemy garrison. Russian soldiers found themselves under crossfire from all sides and from buildings, and several units broke early and suffered heavy casualties in their retreat.

Kościuszko's envoy, Tomasz Maruszewski, and Ignacy Działyński and others had been laying the groundwork for the uprising since early 1793. They succeeded in winning popular support: the majority of Polish units stationed in Warsaw joined the ranks of the uprising. A National Militia was formed by several thousand volunteers, led by Jan Kiliński, a master shoemaker.

Within hours, the fighting had spread from a single street at the western outskirts of Warsaw's Old Town to the entire city. Part of the Russian garrison was able to retreat to Powązki under the cover of Prussian cavalry, but most of it was trapped inside the city. The isolated Russian forces resisted in several areas for two more days.

== Prelude ==
Following the Second Partition of Poland of 1793, the presence of Prussian and Imperial Russian garrisons on Polish soil was almost continuous. The foreign occupation forces contributed both to the economic collapse of the already-weakened state and to the growing radicalisation of the population of Warsaw. Foreign influence at the Polish court, often embodied by Russian ambassador Nikolai Repnin, had been strong for many years; during the partitions of Poland it started to influence the Polish government and szlachta (nobility), and the entire people.

After losing the Polish–Russian War of 1792, the Permanent Council was pressured by Russia to enact an army reform, in which the Polish Army was reduced by half, and the demobilised soldiers conscripted into the Russian and Prussian armies. This move was secretly opposed by many officers and the arms and supplies of disbanded units were stored in warehouses in Warsaw.

Upon receiving news of Kościuszko's proclamation in Kraków (24 March) and his subsequent victory at Racławice (4 April), tension in Warsaw grew rapidly. Polish king Stanisław August Poniatowski was opposed to Kościuszko's uprising, and with the Permanent Council issued a declaration condemning it on 2 April. The King dispatched Piotr Ożarowski, who as Grand Hetman of the Crown was the second-highest military commander after the king, and the Marshal of the Permanent Council, Józef Ankwicz, to Iosif Igelström, Russian ambassador and commander of all Russian occupation forces in Poland, with a proposal to evacuate both the Russian troops and Polish troops loyal to the King to a military encampment at Nowy Dwór Mazowiecki.

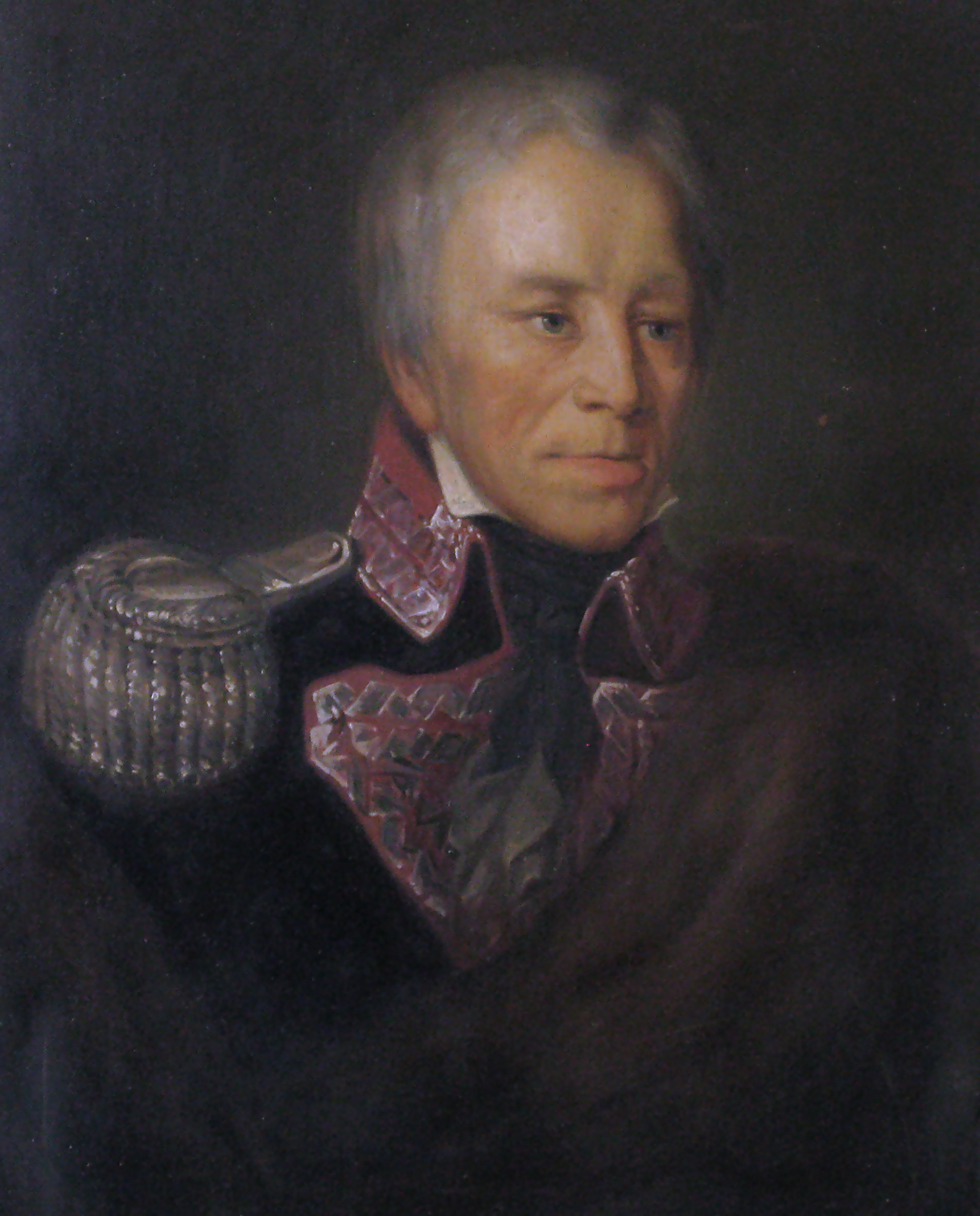
General Stanisław Mokronowski

Igelström rejected the plan and saw no need for the Russians to evacuate Warsaw. He sent a corps under General Aleksandr Khrushchev to intercept Kościuszko and prevent him from approaching Warsaw. He also ordered increased surveillance of suspected supporters of the uprising, and imposed censorship all mail passing through Warsaw. Igelström issued orders for the arrest of those he suspected of having any connection with the insurrection. These included some of the more prominent political leaders, among them Generals Antoni Madaliński, Kazimierz Nestor Sapieha and Ignacy Działyński, King's Chamberlain Jan Walenty Węgierski, Marshal of the Sejm Stanisław Małachowski, Ignacy and Stanisław Potocki and Hugo Kołłątaj. At the same time Russian forces started preparations to disarm the weak Polish garrison of Warsaw under General Stanisław Mokronowski by seizing the Warsaw Arsenal at Miodowa Street. These orders only made the situation worse as they were leaked to the Poles.

The Russian forces prepared a plan to seize the most important buildings to secure the city until reinforcements arrived from Russia. General Johann Jakob Pistor suggested that the barracks of "unsafe" Polish units be surrounded and the units disarmed, and the Warsaw Arsenal captured to prevent the revolutionaries from seizing arms. At the same time bishop Józef Kossakowski, known for his pro-Russian stance, suggested that the churches be surrounded on Holy Saturday on 19 April with troops and all suspects attending the mass be arrested.

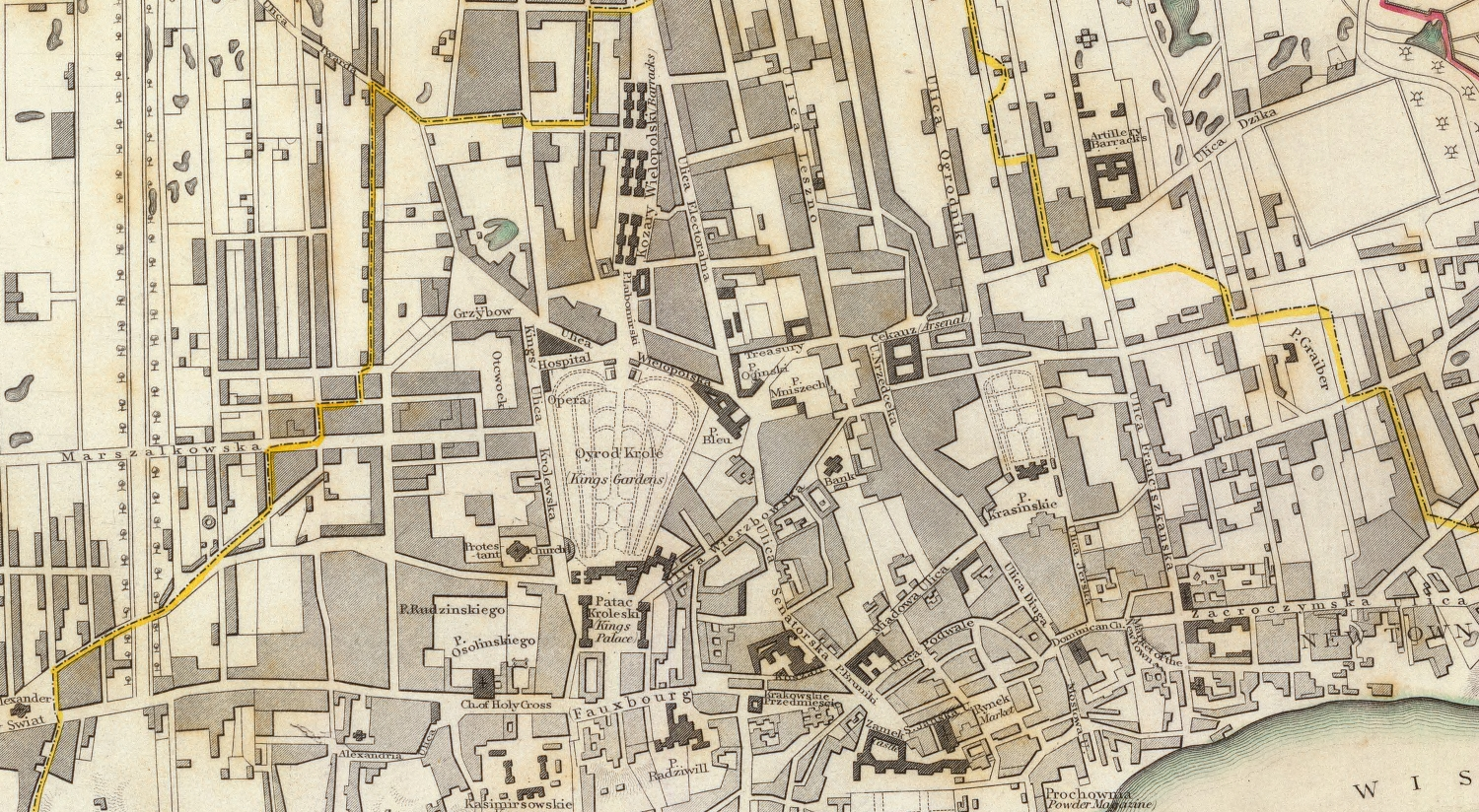
Centre of Warsaw as seen on an 1831 map

On the Polish side, weakened by the arrests of some of its leaders, both the radical Polish Jacobins and the centrist supporters of King Stanisław August Poniatowski began preparing plans for an all-out attack on the Russian forces to drive them from Warsaw, which was still in theory the capital of an independent state. Kościuszko already had supporters in Warsaw, including Tomasz Maruszewski, his envoy who was sent to Warsaw with a mission to prepare the uprising. Maruszewski created the Revolution Association (Związek Rewolucyjny), organizing the previously independent anti-Russian factions. The Association included among its members various high-ranking officers from the Polish forces stationed in Warsaw. Among them were Michał Chomentowski, Gen. Krystian Godfryd Deybel de Hammerau, Major Józef Górski, Capt. Stanisław Kosmowski, Fryderyk Melfort, Dionizy Poniatowski, Lt. Grzegorz Ropp and Józef Zeydlitz.

Among the most influential partisans of the uprising was General Jan August Cichowski, the military commander of the Warsaw's garrison. He and General Stepan Stepanovich Apraksin devised a plan to defend the city against the revolutionaries, and convinced the Russians to leave the Arsenal, the Royal Castle and the Gunpowder Depot defended by the Polish units. Cichowski also undermined the Russian plan to reduce the number of soldiers serving in the Polish units, which also added to the later Polish successes. Also, a prominent burgher, shoemaking master Jan Kiliński, started gathering support from other townsfolk. The King remained passive, and subsequent events unfolded without any support — or opposition — from him.

=== Opposing forces ===
As a large part of the Polish forces consisted of irregular militia or regular units in various stages of demobilisation, the exact number of the troops fighting on the Polish side is difficult to estimate. Pay rolls of the Russian garrison have been preserved, which give a fairly accurate number of regular soldiers available to Igelström.

The Polish regular forces consisted of 3000 men at arms and 150 horses. The largest Polish unit was the Foot Guard of the Polish Crown Regiment with 950 men at arms. The regiment was stationed in its barracks in Żoliborz, away from the city centre, but it was also responsible for guarding the Royal Castle and some of the strategically important buildings. The 10th Regiment of Foot was to be reduced to 600 men, but in April 1794 could still muster some 850 soldiers. In addition, two companies of the reduced Fusilier Regiment were stationed in the vicinity of the Arsenal and still had 248 soldiers.

The Polish forces included a variety of smaller units in various stages of demobilisation, among them the 4th Regiment of Front Guard, 331 men of the 5th Cavalry Regiment and 364 men of the once-powerful Horse Guard of the Polish Crown Regiment. In the eastern borough of Praga there were 680 men and 337 horses of the royal uhlan squadrons and the Engineering Battalion ("pontonniers"). The latter units crossed the Vistula and took part in the fighting, but served as standard infantry as their horses had to be left on the other side of the river. Kazimierz Bartoszewicz in his monograph of the Uprising assesses that the number of townspeople serving in various irregular militia forces did not exceed 3000, and probably totalled between 1500 and 2000. Many of them were demobilised veterans of regular Polish units who followed their units to Warsaw.

The Russian garrison of Warsaw had a nominal strength of 11,750 men, including 1500 cavalrymen, at least 1000 artillerymen with 39 guns and an unspecified number of Cossacks. Due to widespread corruption among Russian officers, Russian infantry battalions rarely had more than 500 men at arms instead of the nominal strength of 960. According to the Russian payroll found after the uprising in the Russian embassy and published soon after in the Gazeta Wolna Warszawska newspaper, the Russian garrison had 7,948 men, 1,041 horses and 34 guns. Most of them were soldiers of the Siberian and Kiev Grenadier Regiments. In addition, Igelström could request assistance from a Prussian unit of General Friedrich von Wölcky stationed west of the city in the fields between Powązki and Marymont. The latter unit had 1,500 men and 4 guns.

Although the Russian force was more numerous than the Polish units left in the city after the Polish–Russian War of 1792, Russian soldiers were dispersed all around the city, guarding numerous warehouses or manning outposts in front of residences of their officers. In addition, their orders in case of an armed uprising were often contradictory and did not take into account the possibility of fighting against regular Polish units.

== 17 April ==
=== Opening moves ===
After the Russian plan of surrounding the churches on Saturday was discovered by the Poles, it was decided that the uprising should start immediately. On Holy Wednesday the Polish garrison was secretly provided with volleys and artillery charges and overnight was dispatched to various parts of the city. The Russians were conscious of the preparations for the uprising and their troops were also equipped with additional ammunition. At 03:30 some 20 Polish dragoons left the Mirów barracks and headed for the Saxon Garden. Encountered by a small Russian force equipped with two cannons guarding the Iron Gate, the squadron charged the Russian positions and captured the guns. Soon afterwards the remainder of the Royal Horse Guard regiment left the barracks on foot and headed in two directions: towards the outer gates of the city at Wola and towards the Warsaw Arsenal, where the Russian forces were preparing an assault. The crew of the Arsenal was also joined by a small troop of National Cavalry under Colonel Jan Jerzy Giessler, who crossed the Vistula overnight.

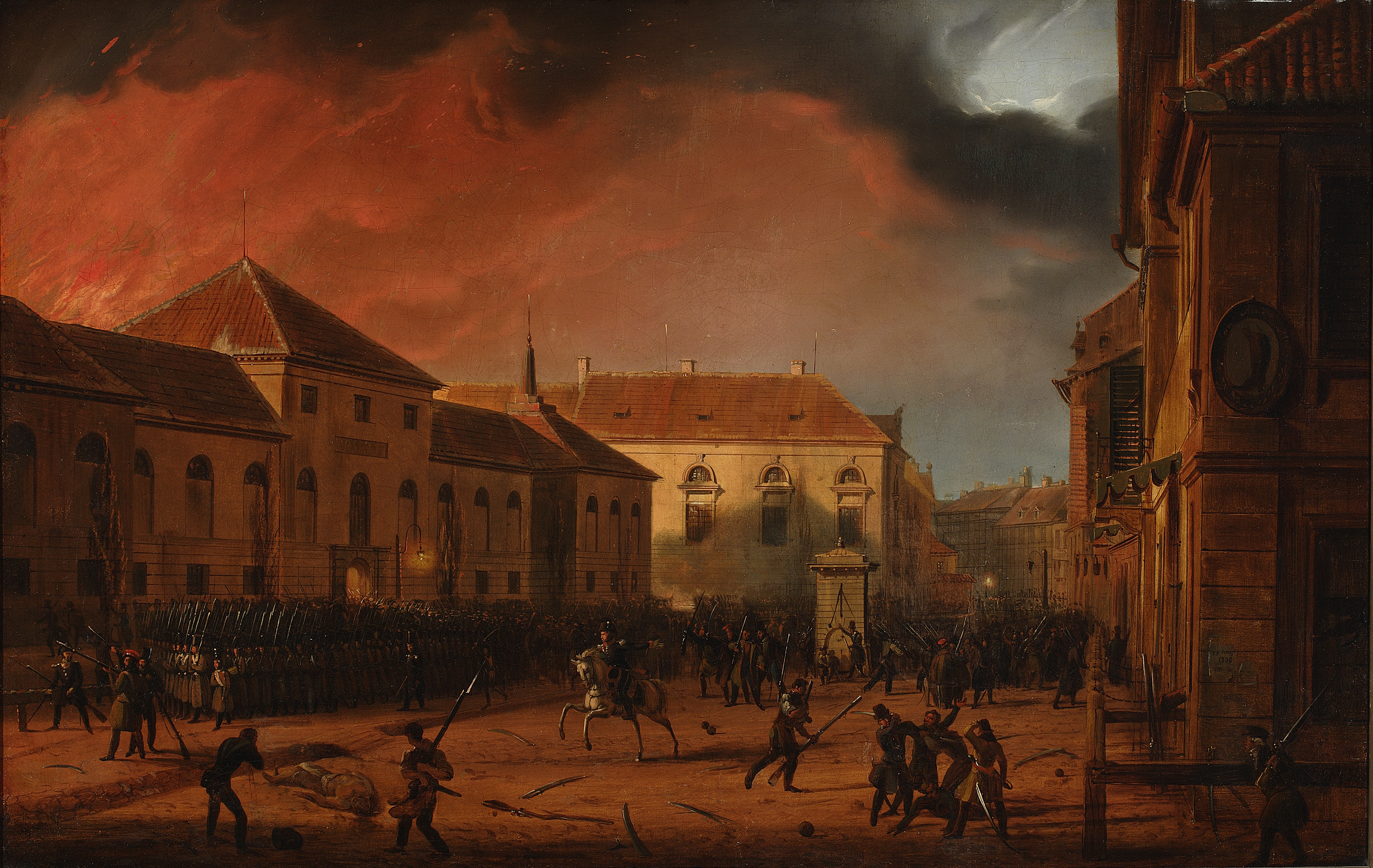
Warsaw Arsenal, on the left, was the scene of heavy fighting during the Uprising, as well as 35 years later, during the November Uprising (pictured).

At 05:00 the planned Russian assault on the Arsenal started, but was repelled by unexpected opposition from Polish forces. After the first shots, the crew of the Arsenal started giving out arms to the civilian volunteers, who quickly joined the fights. The arsenal was secured, but the Polish plan to catch most of the Russian soldiers on the streets rather than in buildings and barracks failed. One such group armed with a cannon broke through the Warsaw's Old Town to Krasiński Square, and two others started marching along Długa Street. Their action spread the uprising to all parts of the city. Until 06:30 the regular units and the militia clashed with the Russian outposts at Nalewki, Bonifraterska, Kłopot and Leszno streets.

The initial clashes caused much confusion as not all forces involved had been notified of the plans of both sides. Among such units was the Royal Foot Guard unit, which broke through to Castle Square, where it was to await further orders. The small troop pledged to defend the monarch as soon as he appeared at the Castle's courtyard, but on hearing the sounds of a battle nearby, the unit left the king and joined the fighting at Miodowa Street; The Russian forces, pushed back after their initial failure at the gates of the Arsenal, withdrew towards Miodowa Street, where they amassed in front of Igelström's palace. There they were shelled by a small Polish force stationed in the gardens of the Krasiński Palace, but destroyed the Polish unit and successfully reorganise and rally. The chaos in the Russian ranks could not be eliminated as Igelström's headquarters had been cut out from the rest of the city and he could not send a request for reinforcement to Russian units stationed outside the city centre and the Russian chain of command had been practically paralysed. By 07:00 the confusion was partially cleared and heavy fighting at Miodowa street turned into a regular battle in the vicinity of both the Arsenal and Igelström's headquarters, as both sides struggled to secure both buildings. Three Russian assault groups, each of them battalion strength, attacked the Arsenal from three sides: from Tłomackie, along Miodowa Street and from Franciszkańska Street. All the Russian assaults were repelled with heavy losses on both sides and the Poles started a counter-attack towards the Russian positions at Miodowa, Senatorska, Leszno and Podwale Streets, but with little success.

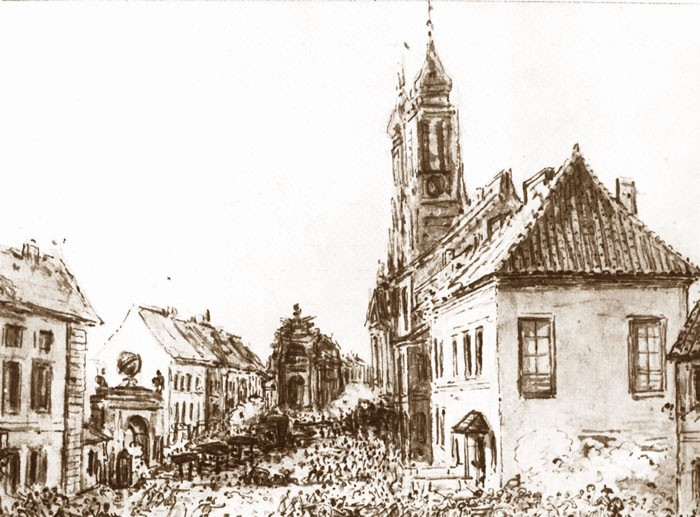
A witness to the fighting was Jan Piotr Norblin (1740–1830), a French-born Polish painter who created a set of sketches and paintings of the struggle.

The assault on Leszno Street was aimed at the Russian battalion occupying positions before the Carmelite Church. After several hours' heavy close-quarters fighting, the Russian forces were forced to retreat to the church itself, where fighting continued. The Russian soldiers surrendered, and only a small detachment, mostly of officers, continued the fight inside the church, where most of them perished. Also the Russian battalion under Major Titov, stationed at Bonifraterska Street, had been attacked around 07:00 by the Poles. After four hours' fighting, the Russians retreated towards the city's western outskirts.

At 06:00 the Polish 10th Regiment of Foot under Colonel Filip Hauman had left its barracks at Ujazdów to the south of the city centre, and started its march towards the Royal Castle. As an effect of the chaos in Russian ranks, the regiment reached Nowy Świat Street and Świętokrzyska Streets unopposed by Russian units stationed there, as the Russian commanders did not know what to do. It was stopped by a Russian force at Krakowskie Przedmieście Street, consisting of no less than 600 men and 5 pieces of artillery, and commanded by General Miłaszewicz. The Russian force was strategically dislocated on both sides of the street, in both the Kazimierz Palace (now the Warsaw University rectorate) and before Holy Cross Church. Colonel Hauman started lengthy negotiations with the Russian commander asking him to allow the Polish forces to pass. The negotiations were broken and at 08:00 the Polish regiment assaulted the Russian positions. After a skirmish that ensued the Polish unit was partially dispersed and had to retreat. Parts of the unit under Major Stanisław Lipnicki retreated to the Dominican Church, where the fights continued. Other troop under Lieutenant Sypniewski broke through to the Branicki Palace, yet others found their way farther towards the Old Town, outflanking the Russians. Because of that, the Russian infantry under General Miłaszewicz and a small cavalry force under Prince Gagarin, though victorious, found themselves under crossfire and surrounded. In addition, a small yet loud militia force under Jan Kiliński (Note: The number of civilians in that troop was most probably no greater than 150 people, though Kiliński in his memoirs seriously overstated both the Russian and Polish numbers. In his memoirs he cites the Russian force of 4000 and the militia unit of 5000.) appeared on their rear and all of the Polish units in the area assaulted the Russians from all directions, which resulted in almost complete destruction of the Russian units. General Miłaszewicz was wounded trying to retreat with the remnants of his force towards the Kazimierz Palace, while Prince Gagarin retreated with some cavalrymen towards the Saxon Garden, where they were ambushed by civilians who killed almost all of them. (Note: A popular legend has it that Gagarin perished in a fight with certain blacksmith's pupil, who killed him with an iron pole.) The 10th Regiment then reformed around noon and moved towards the Castle Square, where it took part in the fights against smaller Russian forces in the Old Town.

=== City centre ===
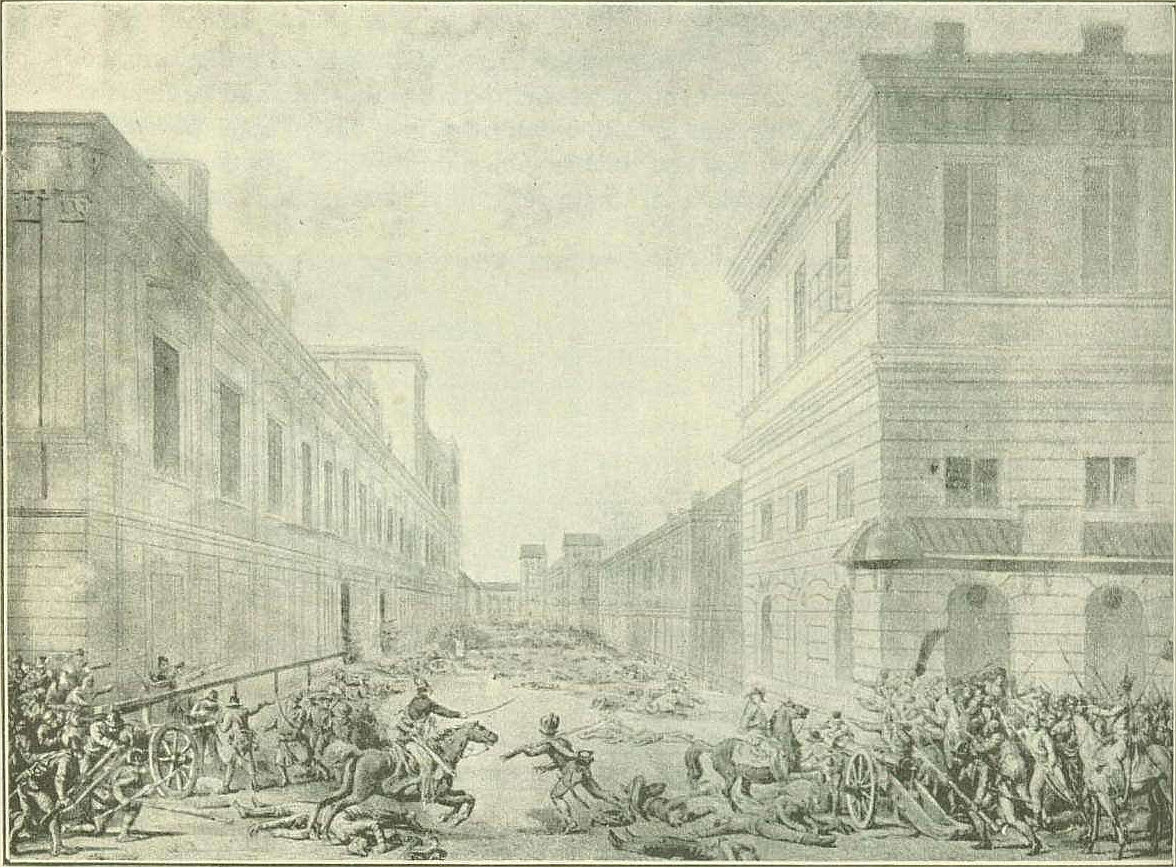
Fighting at Miodowa Street on Krakowskie Przedmieście, sketch by Jan Piotr Norblin, 1794

The victory of the 10th Regiment marked a turning point in the uprising, as it broke the morale of the Russian forces. After noon the fighting in front of Igelström's headquarters, at Miodowa Street and for the Arsenal continued as both sides drew reinforcements from all parts of the city. Russian units put up the strongest defence and although they were forced to retreat in the direction of the Franciscan church, they repelled early Polish attacks and captured the Krasiński Palace which the Poles had been using to fire on them from behind. At the same time the palace's garden remained in Polish hands and heavy fighting spread to that area as well. In other parts of the city smaller Russian forces defended themselves in isolated manors, as was the case of Szanowski's house at the Vistula in the borough of Powiśle, where a small Russian troop offered fierce resistance against the 10th Regiment until late afternoon. Nearby, a Russian force under Major Mayer, consisting of two companies, each armed with a cannon, fortified itself in the Kwieciński's Baths, where it defended itself for several hours. After repeated charges by the 10th Regiment, the Russian commander was left with no more than 80 men, with whom he retreated to the other side of the river.

In the meantime, the king and some members of the Targowica Confederation took refuge in the Warsaw Castle. Among them were Piotr Ożarowski, Józef Ankwicz, Great Crown Marshall Fryderyk Józef Moszyński and the king's brother Kazimierz Poniatowski. From there they tried to restore peace, but without any success. Poniatowski nominated two trusted people to take command of the troops: Ignacy Wyssogota Zakrzewski became the mayor of Warsaw, and general Stanisław Mokronowski became the commander-in-chief of the Warsaw troops, but both quickly turned to support the uprising.

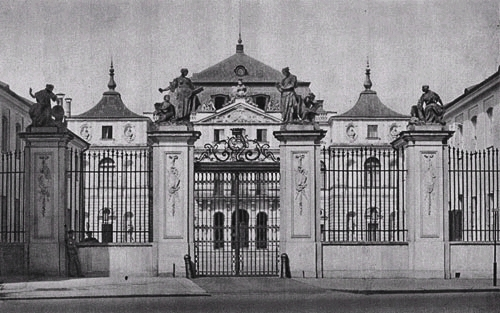
Brühl Palace in Warsaw.

At the same time General Ivan Novitskiy amassed more than half the Russian forces at the western end of Jerusalem Avenue. 4,000 men were withdrawn from there without a shot being fired. Among the units rallied there were forces that – according to the Russian plan – were to secure the entire southern part of Warsaw, including forces under Lieutenant-Colonel Kasztoliński and von Klugen, parts of Igelström's personal guard and the remnants of the force to take part in the battle against the 10th Regiment, commanded by Major Bago. Novitskiy, after several hours of wavering, organised a relief force of 3000 men and 10 cannons, and started a march towards the city centre. The column crossed Marszałkowska Street unopposed and reached Saxon Square. There it was met by a negligible unit of not more than 100 civilians armed with a single 6-pounder cannon, (Note: Kukiel mentions 60 to 100 men, Pistor 50 to 60, with 2 artillery officers.) commanded by Captain of Artillery Jacek Drozdowski. The Polish unit opened fire from its cannon and started gradually retreating across the square towards the Brühl's Palace on its northern edge, firing all the way. At the same time the Russian commander did not issue any orders and his column simply stopped under fire. Although much inferior in numbers, training and equipment, Drozdowski's unit was not attacked by the Russian force, as Novitskiy lost control over his troops. The Russian soldiers broke ranks and entered the undefended Saxon Palace, where they seized the cellars full of alcohol. The Poles continued to shell them with artillery for almost three hours, without being attacked. When a company of the 10th Regiment returning from Powiśle appeared at Królewska Street, the Russians started a disorganised retreat towards Jerusalem Avenue, leaving Igelström to his fate.

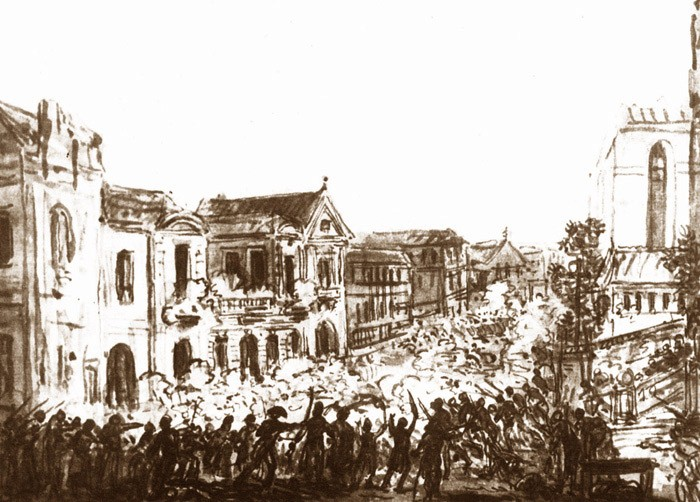
Assault on the Russian Embassy, sketch by Jan Piotr Norblin.

The retreat of the Russian unit allowed the Poles to repel other assaults by Russian forces as well, including an attack by a thousand men from Warsaw's New Town towards the northern gate of the Old Town. Although the Russian force broke through to the Old Town, it had lost all its guns and more than half of its men. Also repelled were repeated assaults on the Arsenal from Miodowa Street, under the command of General Tishchev. The Russians, approaching in three columns, did not coordinate their manoeuvres, allowing the Poles to deal with them separately. The first column under Tishchev approached the Arsenal at 15:00 from Miodowa Street. Although one of the building's turrets exploded, the Poles repelled the assault within half an hour, before the Russians had gathered reinforcements. The second Russian column approached the Arsenal through the Krasiński Gardens, but was stopped by massed fire from several cannon concealed in the bushes. The third Russian battalion, commanded by Tishchev personally, approached the Arsenal from the west, along Leszno Street, where it was stopped by the Royal Guard. After a fierce fight, Tishchev died soon after a cannonball ripped his leg off, and the remainder of his force surrendered to the Poles.

In these circumstances the Poles began a counter-attack aimed at capturing Igelström's palace and the positions of the forces that he had around him. These included a battalion under Johann Jakob Pistor; a battalion drawn from Marywil commanded by Colonel Parfyeniev; a battalion of the famed Siberian Regiment; and some cavalry under Brigadier Baur. All but Parfyeniev's men had previously been involved in the failed assaults at the Arsenal and towards the Royal Castle, and all were battle-hardened. As the Poles took several buildings along Senatorska Street opposite the palace and fired at the Russians from the windows, the Russians could not reorganise their ranks and hid in the palace and the nearby Capuchin Church. Before 16:00, Działyński's Regiment reached Senatorska Street and began a frontal assault on the palace, but was bloodily repelled by the Russian defenders. Constant fire from the windows and roofs of nearby houses prevented them from mounting a counter-attack and both sides reached a stalemate. Because of that Igelström was left with little option but to await reinforcements from the outside, which did not happen. After dark a small unit under Major Titov broke through to Igelström, but his force was not strong enough to break the stalemate.

Unable to reach the palace, the Poles assaulted the Russian positions in front of the Capuchin Church and the adjoining monastery. The Russians withdrew to the courtyard, from where the fighting spread to the entire monastery. The Poles secured the courtyard and placed a cannon there, which allowed them to storm the monastery, but fierce hand-to-hand fighting, with heavy losses on both sides, continued until late evening. In the coming night, some smaller Russian units lost cohesion and attempted to retreat on their own. Many soldiers engaged in looting, and Krasiński's Palace was among the most prominent buildings looted by the soldiers during the Uprising.

== 18 April ==
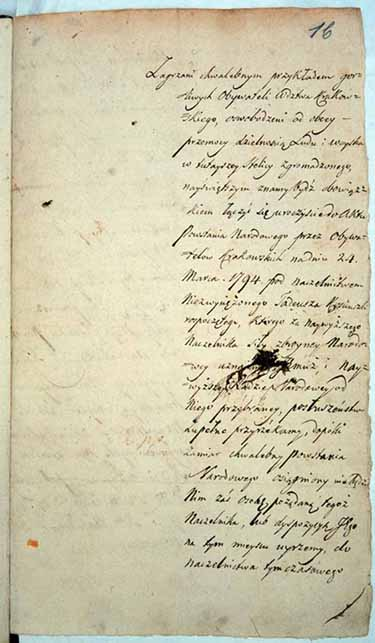
Document of accession of the city of Warsaw to Kościuszko Uprising, signed on 19 April

Overnight the fights in various parts of the city continued. The isolated Russian units defended themselves in houses in various parts of the city. In the early morning of 18 April, Mokronowski concentrated on the main remaining Russian stronghold in the city — the embassy at Miodowa Street. The Polish units, reinforced with the civilian volunteers, continued the repeated assaults on the building's courtyard. Although all were bloodily repelled, the Russians suffered significant losses as well, particularly by constant fire from buildings located to the other side of the street. The Russians held a small area delimited by Miodowa and Długa Streets, as well as Krasiński Square and the palace. Believing further defence of his palace was futile, Igelström left only a token force of 400 men there and withdrew to the Krasiński Palace. He planned to prepare a sortie in order to break through from the city centre, but all surrounding streets were filled with Polish troops and cannons.

Igelström requested permission to capitulate around 10:00, having been unable to command most of his troops during the uprising. After being granted a truce, he withdrew to the Prussian camp near Warsaw in Powązki, and then further away from the city, towards Karczew. The exact number of troops that retreated with Igelström is unknown and varies from source to source, but most estimates place it at between 300 and 400 men, with 8 cannons. As soon as Igelström's retreat was discovered, the assault on Russian positions was resumed. The remaining troops defending the embassy and covering Igelström's retreat eventually ran out of ammunition and their positions were overrun by 17:00 by the forces of the 10th Regiment under Kalinowski, aided by Kiliński's militia. Polish forces released political prisoners held by Russians in the basement and were able to secure most of the embassy's secret archive, covering all of Russian secret operations in Poland since 1763. Among the prominent captives taken during the final fights for the embassy was Colonel Parfyeniev. Among the captured documents were the lists of various Polish officials on the Russian payroll; many of them were later executed. The Polish forces also captured the treasury of the Russian ambassador, exceeding 95,000 golden ducats. This Polish victory marked the end of the uprising, with the last Russian units either routed or in retreat. The last small spots of Russian resistance were eliminated or surrendered on that day.

== Casualties ==
During the chaotic battle the Russian force lost 2,265 men killed and around 2,000 wounded. (Note: Williams cites 2,000 dead, Kukiel 2,250. PWN Encyclopedia cites "over 4,000 soldiers lost", but this number includes both dead and wounded.) In addition, 1926 Russian soldiers were taken prisoner of war, including 161 officers. (Note: Kukiel cites 1,500 prisoners, Rambaud and Saltus mention 2,000.)

Losses among Polish regular forces amounted to between 800 and 1000 dead and wounded; civilian casualties and losses among various irregular militia units did not exceed 700.

== Aftermath ==
Several factors contributed to the Russian defeat and losses. Igelström had reduced the size of the garrison, sending some of units to deal with Kościuszko's main forces, and posted his remaining regiments so incompetently that they were easily cut off from each other and overwhelmed by the Polish forces. From the onset of the insurrection, the Polish forces were aided by the civilian population and had surprise on their side; after the crowd captured the city arsenal, Russian soldiers found themselves under attack throughout the city.

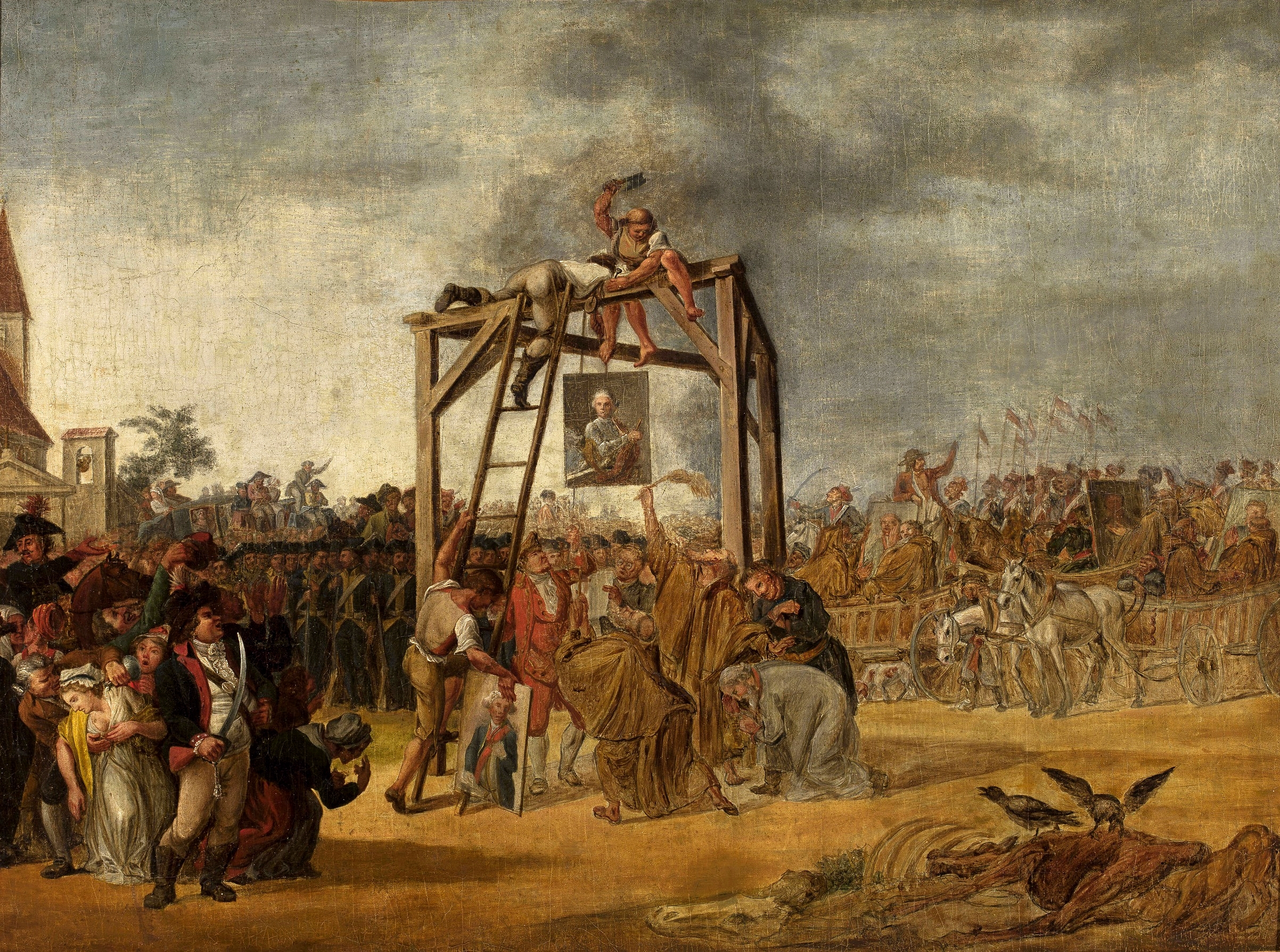
Hanging of traitors at Warsaw's Old Town Market, a contemporary painting by Jan Piotr Norblin. The supporters of the Targowica Confederation, responsible for the Second Partition of Poland, became public enemies. If they could not be captured, their portraits were hanged instead.

The uprising in Warsaw marked a significant victory for the entire cause of Kościuszko, and echoes of the victory in Warsaw spread across the country. Ignacy Zakrzewski became the city's commander in chief and mayor. General Mokronowski repeatedly begged the King, who was at the same time his cousin, to support the uprising. The king refused and power in the city was seized by the Provisional Temporary Council (Polish: Rada Zastępcza Tymczasowa) composed of Zakrzewski, Mokronowski, Józef Wybicki and Kiliński. Mokronowski was soon removed from the council for his opposition to Kościuszko. On 27 May the council was dissolved, and power passed to Kościuszko's Supreme National Council (Polish: Rada Najwyższa Narodowa). On 9 May four prominent supporters of the Targowica Confederation, including Józef Ankwicz, Józef Kossakowski, hetman Piotr Ożarowski and hetman Józef Zabiełło, were sentenced to death by the Insurrectionary Court and were hanged in Warsaw. A few weeks later, on 28 June, an angry mob stormed the prisons and hanged other supporters of Targowica, including bishop Ignacy Jakub Massalski, prince Antoni Stanisław Czetwertyński-Światopełk, ambassador Karol Boscamp-Lasopolski and others. Szczęsny Potocki was not found; his portrait was hoisted on the gallows instead. Kosciuszko quickly put an end to the lynch mob declaring, "What happened in Warsaw yesterday filled my heart with bitterness and sorrow ...Those who do not obey the laws are not worthy of liberty."

The National Militia of Warsaw grew to over 20,000 men at arms and constituted a large part of the Polish Army fighting against Russia. This included 1200 horsemen organised by Peter Jazwinski and 6000 under Kiliński.

The uprising was also openly commented upon in Russia. As a result of this defeat, Igelström was recalled in disgrace, although he would redeem himself in future fighting. In the 19th century the Uprising of 1794 was presented in a bad light in Imperial Russian historiography, as the fights in Warsaw were referred to as a "massacre" of unarmed Russian soldiers by Warsaw's mob. (Note: In the words of Zhukovich: On Thursday of the Holy Week in 1794 in Warsaw the conspirators attacked several Russian detachments, placed far apart from each other. This started a massacre of an unheard of scale. In one church 500 soldiers that came unarmed for Eucharist, were killed. The crowd besotted by the bloodshed ransacked the arsenal and Russians were shot endlessly from all windows and roofs, those in the streets or those running out from their houses. No one could walk along the streets. The crowd snatched anyone in the Russian uniform and beat them to death. The King's troops took part in this repugnant massacre. The king himself had neither the courage to lead the uprising nor to take steps to stop it. In the end, the remnants of the Russian troops had to leave Warsaw.) Russian historian Platon Zhukovich marked his relation of the events with many horrific, yet counter-factual descriptions of unarmed Russian soldiers being slaughtered in an Orthodox church during the Eucharist, even though there was no Orthodox church in Warsaw at that time, the participation of Kiliński's militia was seriously overrated and no other source confirms the thesis that the Russian garrison was unarmed. The defeat in this battle is sometimes seen as one of the reasons for the massacre of Praga, in which the Russian forces killed between 10,000 and 20,000 civilians (Note: Estimates vary, see article on Battle of Praga for details.) of Warsaw upon their reconquest of the city later that year.

The Warsaw Uprising is commemorated on the Tomb of the Unknown Soldier, Warsaw, with the inscription "WARSZAWA 17 IV – 4 XI 1794".
