= Johann Jakob Pistor =

German general

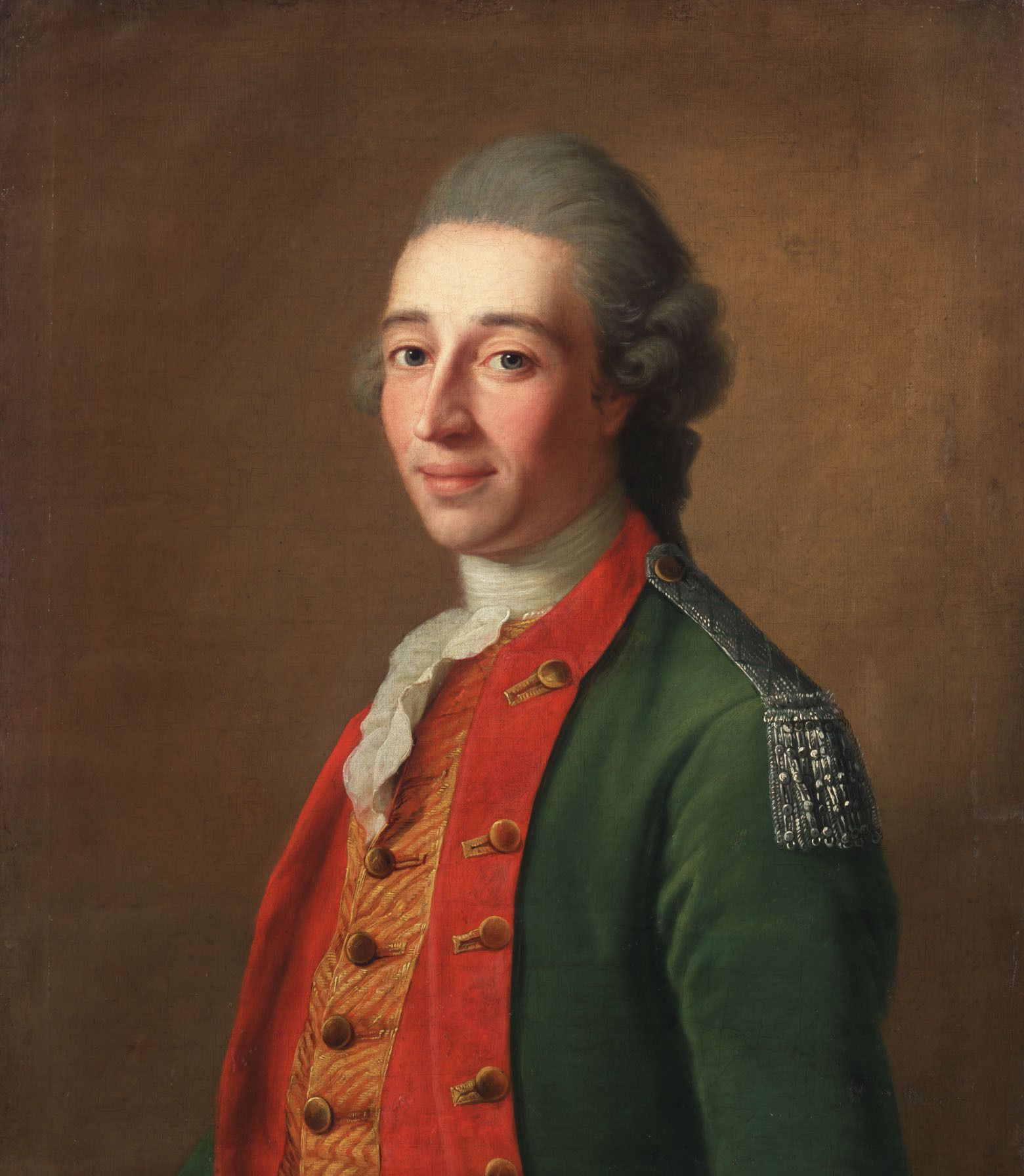
Pistor in a Russian artillery uniform, painting by Johann Werner Kobold

Johann Jakob von Pistor (1739 - 1814), also known as Yakov Matveyevich Pistor (Russian: Яков Матвеевич Пистор), was an 18th-century German general who served in the Imperial Russian Army. One of the most notable commanders of Russian forces in the Warsaw Uprising (1794), he authored a memoir on both the fights in Warsaw and the entire Kościuszko's Uprising.

== Bibliography ==
- Johann Jakob Pistor (1806). Mémoires sur la révolution de la Pologne, trouvés a Berlin (in French). Paris. p. 167.
- Johann Jakob Pistor; Bolesław Prawdzic-Chotomski (1906). Pamiętniki o rewolucyi polskiej z roku 1794 (in Polish). Warsaw: Biblioteka Dzieł Wyborowych. p. 150.
