= Jean Michel de Venture de Paradis =

18th-century French orientalist

Jean-Michel de Venture de Paradis (8 May 1739, Marseille – 16 May 1799, Acre, aged 60) was an 18th-century French orientalist and dragoman.

== Biography ==
The son of a family of diplomats and military (King's interpreter in the Levant), he studied at the École des Jeunes de langues, in the premises of the collège Louis-le-Grand in Paris. After an internship at the Embassy of France in Constantinople, he held various positions of drogoman in Syria, Egypt, Morocco, Tunis and Algiers. He also participated as an interpreter to the inspection mission of the Levant, which was entrusted to baron de Tott, secretary and interpreter of the Embassy of France in Constantinople.

He returned to Paris in 1797 to occupy the chair of Turkish language at the Institut national des langues et civilisations orientales.

He was the oldest member of the Commission des sciences et des arts and was appointed first interpreter (military interpreter) of the Armée d'Orient. He became a member of the Institut d'Égypte 22 August 1798, in the art and literature section.

Jean-Joseph Marcel, who was his pupil says he died from dysentery, while others speak of plague. Another hypothesis assumes that he died April 19, 1799, at Nazareth of illness following the Siege of Acre

Married June 14, 1774, in Cairo with Victoria Digeon, he had two daughters including Jeanne Venture de Paradis who in 1810 married the clockmaker Antoine Louis Breguet, son of the famous Abraham-Louis Breguet, who is an ascendant of actress Clémentine Célarié and the other daughter who married Joseph Sulkowski, Polish aristocrat favorite aide of Napoleon Bonaparte during the expedition of Egypt.

== Bibliography ==
- Tunis et Alger au XVIIIe siècle, Sindbad, 1999 ISBN 978-2727400875
- Alger au XVIIIe siècle, Alger, Jourdan, 1898 available at Gallica
