= Fryderyk de Melfort =

Polish military officer and freedom fighter

Fryderyk de Melfort (1763 - 1797) was a Polish military officer. A soldier of the Royal Foot Guards Regiment, he took part in the Warsaw Uprising (1794), for which on May 21 of that year he was promoted to the rank of Major. After that he remained in Polish formations and took part in the ill-fated expedition of Brigadier Joachim Deniska in Moldavia. Taken prisoner by the Austrians in the battle of Dobronowice of June 30, 1797, he was executed on July 7 of that year.

== See also ==
- Feliks Melfort
