= Jan August Cichocki =

Jan August Cichocki (1750–1795) was a Polish military officer and a general of the Polish Army, notable for his service in the 1794 Warsaw Uprising.

== Biography ==
Thanks to a scholarship funded by Alois Bruhl, Cichocki studied artillery tactics in Dresden. Upon his return to Poland, he co-authored the military reforms of 1776–1779. At the same time until May 1792 he was the commanding officer of the Polish 5th Rifle Regiment (Polish: 5. pułk fizylierów koronnych), after which he was the creator and the first commander of the Polish 15th Regiment of Foot.

By 1794, Cichocki was a General. One of the commanders of the garrison of Warsaw during the Warsaw Uprising, he joined the Kościuszko's Uprising soon afterwards. On June 20, Tadeusz Kościuszko promoted him to the rank of General and nominated him to the post of the commander of the Narew river front, where however he showed little value as a front commander. Cichocki was dismissed to some unimportant post in Warsaw.

He died November 18, 1795, and was buried at the Holy Cross cemetery in Warsaw.
