= 10th Regiment of Foot (Poland) =

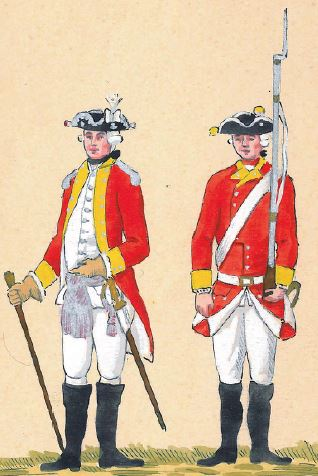
Illustration of the regiment in 1775

The 10th Regiment of Foot (Polish: 10. regiment pieszy, also known as the 10th Regiment of Foot of Działyński and Radzyński Regiment) was a line infantry regiment of the Polish Crown Army. Initially raised in 1775 as the Regiment of Foot of the Land of Rydzyna, it was stationed in Rydzyna under Colonel Ignacy Działyński. Relocated to Warsaw, in 1789 it was numbered as the 11th Foot and in 1794 as the 10th Foot. Forming part of the Warsaw garrison, the regiment was stationed in the Ujazdów Castle. It took part in the 1794 Warsaw Uprising and formed the core of the Polish rebel army, fighting in the Battle of Praga and Battle of Maciejowice.

== Notable officers ==
- August Sułkowski (1775–1786)
- Aleksander Mycielski (1786–1788)
- Ignacy Działyński (1788–1789)
- Karol de Falckenhayn
- Filip Hauman
- Józef Zeydlitz
