= Attempted assassination of Andrew Jackson =

1835 failed assassination attempt

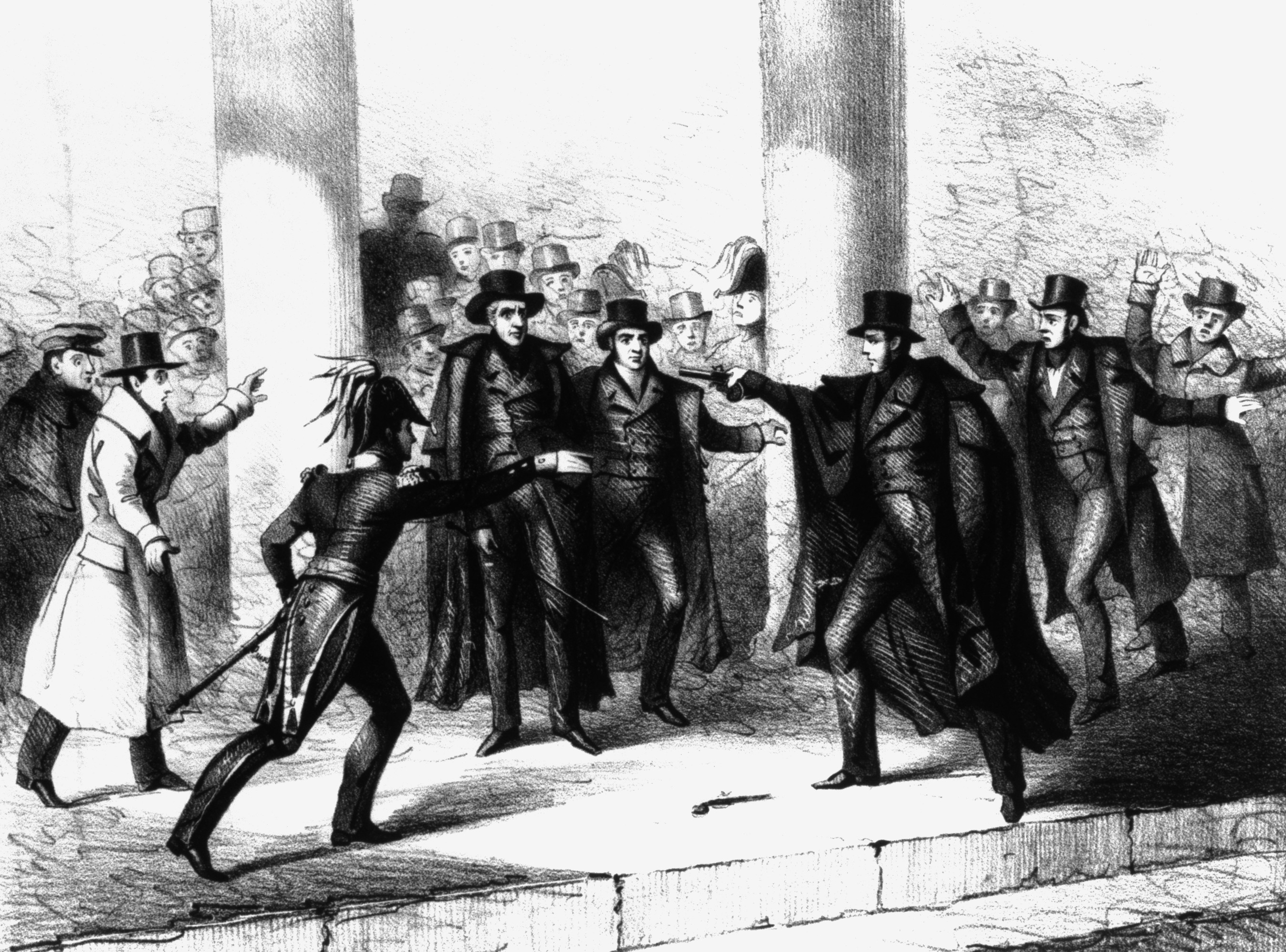
- Illustration of the assassination attempt, 1835
- Location: Outside the United States Capitol, Washington, D.C., U.S.
- Date: January 30, 1835; 191 years ago
- Target: Andrew Jackson
- Attack type: Attempted assassination by shooting
- Weapon: Flintlock duelling pistol (x2)
- Deaths: 0
- Injuries: 1 (perpetrator)
- Perpetrator: Richard Lawrence
- Motive: Insane delusions
- Charges: Assault upon the president of the United States with intent to murder
- Verdict: Not guilty by reason of insanity
- Sentence: Involuntary commitment

On January 30, 1835, Andrew Jackson, the 7th president of the United States, survived an assassination attempt outside of the United States Capitol in Washington, D.C. while returning to the White House from a funeral. Richard Lawrence, a British-American unemployed house painter, approached Jackson and attempted to shoot him, but both of Lawrence's pistols misfired. Jackson charged Lawrence and beat him with his walking cane before Lawrence was taken into custody. This is the first known attempted assassination of a U.S. president.

After the assassination attempt, Lawrence was found not guilty by reason of insanity. He was institutionalized in an insane asylum for the remainder of his life. Jackson, aged 67 at the time of the assault, served for over two more years as president before completing his term in office.

The odds of both pistols misfiring the way they did was estimated to be 1 in 125,000.

== Background ==
The 1828 presidential election marked the rise of Jacksonian democracy and the transition from the First Party System to the Second Party System. The "Age of Jackson" experienced much political turmoil and realigned American politics for decades. Major events, like the nullification crisis and the rechartering of the Second Bank of the United States, known as the "Bank War", became the central issues that divided the American people. Jackson was the most influential and controversial political figure of the 1830s.

In January 1835, Senator John C. Calhoun, Jackson's first vice president and a leading proponent of nullification, called Jackson "a Caesar who ought to have a Brutus."

Richard Lawrence became convinced that he was Richard III of England and that the U.S. government owed him a large sum of money. He believed opposition to the Second Bank of the United States by "King Andrew" (in reference to Andrew Jackson) was preventing the distribution of the money he believed he was owed. He felt that if Jackson were no longer in office, Vice President Martin Van Buren would establish a national bank and allow Congress to pay him the money for his English estate claims.

== Assassination attempt ==
In the weeks leading up to the assassination attempt, Lawrence began observing Jackson's movements. Witnesses later testified that Lawrence was often seen sitting in his paint shop muttering to himself about Jackson. On Friday, January 30, 1835, the day of the assassination attempt, Lawrence was seen sitting in his paint shop with a book in his hand while laughing. Lawrence suddenly got up, left the shop and stated, "I'll be damned if I don't do it."

Later on that same day, Jackson was attending the funeral of South Carolina representative Warren R. Davis at the U.S. Capitol. Lawrence originally planned to shoot Jackson as he entered the service, but was unable to get close enough to him. By the time Jackson left the funeral, Lawrence had found a space near a pillar on the East Portico, where Jackson would pass. As the President walked by, Lawrence stepped out and fired his first pistol at Jackson's back; it misfired. As Lawrence pulled a second pistol and took aim, Jackson charged his assailant with his cane held high. Lawrence quickly pulled the trigger of his second pistol, but it also misfired.

After Lawrence's unsuccessful attempts, Jackson proceeded to beat Lawrence with a cane. The crowd, which included Tennessee congressman and frontiersman Davy Crockett, eventually intervened and wrestled Lawrence into submission. Lawrence became the first known person to attempt to kill a sitting U.S. president.

== Perpetrator ==
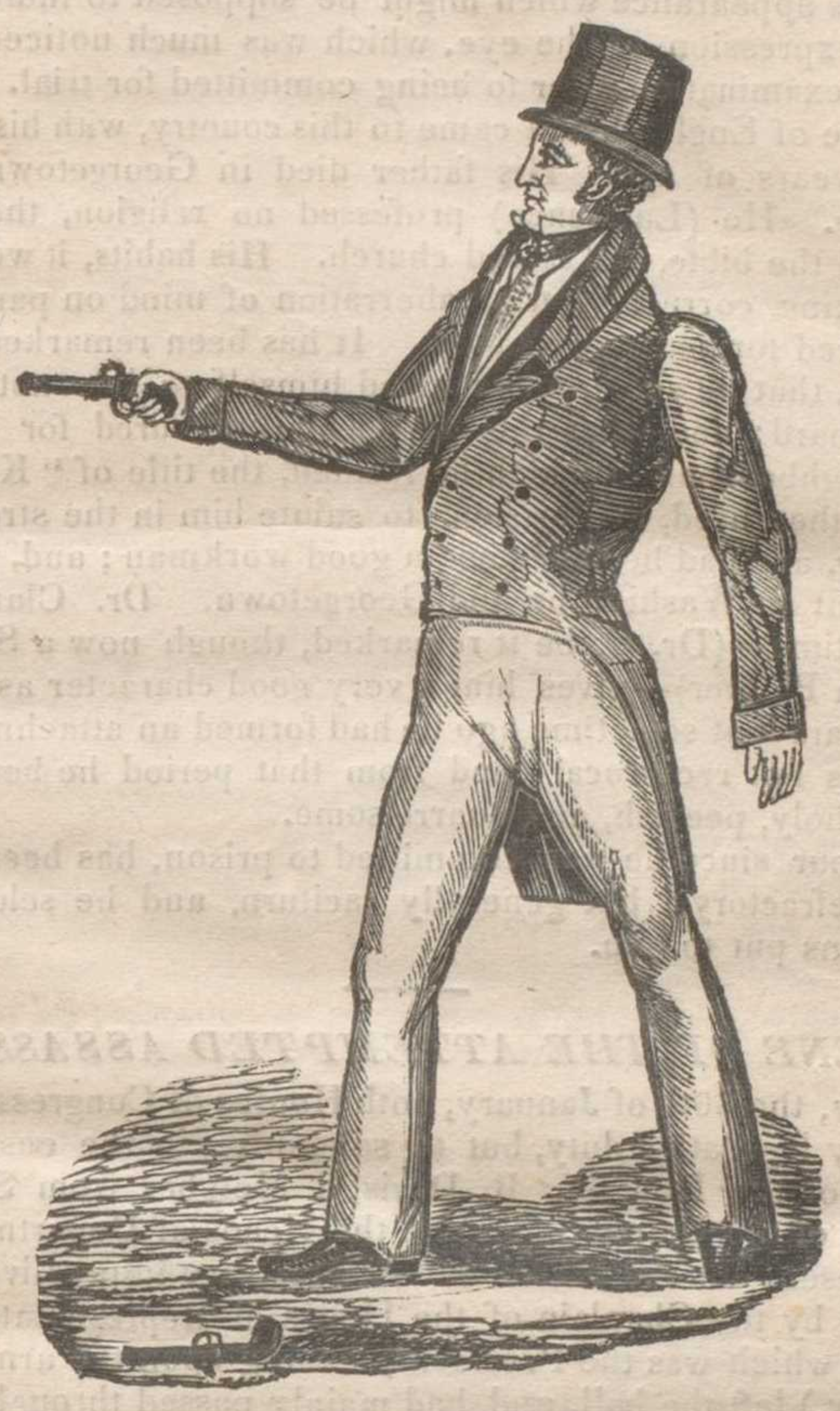
Depiction of Lawrence, 1835

The attempt on Jackson's life was perpetrated by Richard Lawrence, a British American unemployed house painter. He was born around 1800, in England, Great Britain. His family migrated to the United States when he was 12 years old and settled in Virginia. Lawrence's childhood and early adult years were apparently normal as was his behavior. At his trial, he was described by acquaintances and relatives as a "relatively fine young boy" who was "reserved in his manner; but industrious and of good moral habits."

Lawrence's behavior and mental stability had inexplicably changed by November 1832. He abruptly announced to his family that he was returning to England, and he left Washington shortly thereafter. He returned a month later telling his family he had decided not to travel abroad as it was too cold. Shortly after returning, he again announced that he was returning to England to study landscape painting.

Around the time Lawrence believed he was Richard III, his personality and outward appearance changed dramatically. Once conservatively dressed, Lawrence grew a mustache and began buying expensive and flamboyant clothing, which he would change three or four times a day. He would stand in the doorway of his home for hours and gaze into the street. Neighborhood children would jokingly address him as "King Richard", which typically pleased Lawrence, who failed to realize the children were mocking him. He also demonstrated signs of paranoia and became hostile towards others. On one occasion, he threatened to kill a maid whom he thought was laughing at him. Lawrence also began verbally and physically abusing his family, mainly his sisters, over imagined slights. At Lawrence's trial, witnesses described the bizarre behavior that he exhibited. Several people testified that Lawrence would engage in nonsensical conversations with himself, and others stated that he would have laughing and cursing fits.

== Aftermath and trial ==
On April 11, 1835, Lawrence was brought to trial at the District of Columbia City Hall. The prosecuting attorney was Francis Scott Key. At his trial, Lawrence was prone to wild rants and he refused to recognize the legitimacy of the proceedings. At one point he said to the courtroom, "It is for me, gentlemen, to pass judgment on you, and not you upon me." After only five minutes of deliberation, the jury found Lawrence "not guilty by reason of insanity".

In the years following his acquittal, Lawrence was held by several institutions and hospitals. In 1855, he was committed to the newly opened Government Hospital for the Insane (later renamed St. Elizabeths Hospital), in Washington, D.C., where he remained until his death on June 13, 1861.

It was later determined that the weapons that he had chosen were noted for being vulnerable to moisture, and the weather on that date was humid and damp.

== Conspiracy theories ==
There has long been speculation that Lawrence was part of a conspiracy. While nobody denied Lawrence's involvement, many people, including Jackson, believed that he might have been supported in or put up to carrying out the assassination attempt by the President's political enemies. Senator Calhoun made a statement on the Senate floor that he was not connected to the attack. Nevertheless, Jackson believed that Calhoun, an old enemy, was at the bottom of the attempt.

Jackson also suspected a former friend and supporter, Senator George Poindexter of Mississippi, who had used Lawrence to do some house painting a few months earlier. Because Poindexter was unable to convince his supporters in Mississippi that he was not involved in a plot against Jackson, he was defeated for re-election. However, no evidence was ever discovered that connected Lawrence with either Calhoun or Poindexter in a plot to kill Jackson.

== See also ==
- List of United States presidential assassination attempts and plots

== Sources ==
- Clarke, James W. (2012). Defining Danger: American Assassins and the New Domestic Terrorists. New Brunswick, NJ: Transaction Publishers. ISBN 978-1-4128-4590-8. OCLC 743040369.
- Johnson, Scott Patrick (2010). Trials of the Century: An Encyclopedia of Popular Culture and the Law, Volume 1. Santa Barbara, CA: ABC-CLIO. ISBN 978-1-59884-261-6. OCLC 702674902.
- Oliver, Willard M. & Marion, Nancy E. (2010). Killing the President: Assassinations, Attempts, and Rumored Attempts on U.S. Commanders-In-Chief. Santa Barbara, CA: ABC-CLIO. ISBN 978-0-313-36474-7. OCLC 733346450.
- Regan, Chris (2008). Mass Historia: 365 Days of Historical Facts and (Mostly) Fictions. Kansas City, MO: Andrews McMeel Publishing. ISBN 978-0-7407-6869-9. OCLC 172521785.
