= Richard Lawrence (failed assassin) =

Failed assassin of Andrew Jackson (c. 1800–1861)

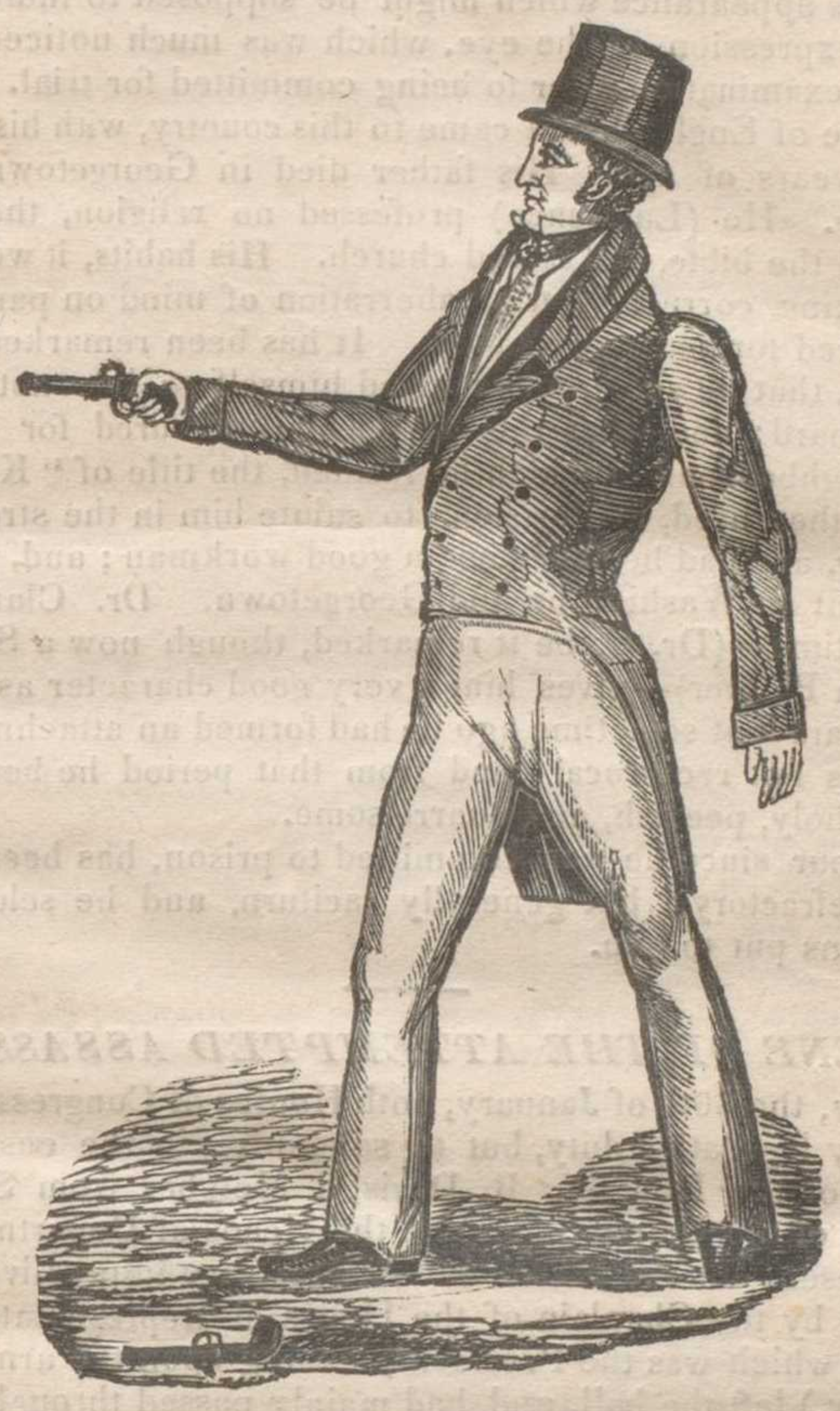
- Depiction of Lawrence, 1835
- Born: c. 1800; England, Great Britain
- Died: June 13, 1861 (aged 60–61); Washington, D.C., U.S.
- Resting place: Rock Creek Cemetery
- Other name: King Richard
- Occupation: House painter
- Known for: Attempt to assassinate Andrew Jackson
- Motive: Insane delusions; Retribution for perceived obstruction of money owed
- Criminal charges: Assault upon the president of the United States with intent to murder
- Verdict: Not guilty by reason of insanity
- Penalty: Involuntary commitment

Details
- Date: January 30, 1835
- Locations: Outside the United States Capitol, Washington, D.C., U.S.

Richard Lawrence (c. 1800 – June 13, 1861) was a British-born American unemployed house painter who was the first known person to attempt the assassination of a sitting president of the United States. Lawrence attempted to shoot President Andrew Jackson outside the United States Capitol on January 30, 1835, however both of his pistols misfired and he was taken into custody. At trial, Lawrence was found not guilty by reason of insanity and spent the remainder of his life in insane asylums.

== Early life ==
Lawrence was born in England, Great Britain most likely around 1800 or 1801. His family migrated to the United States when he was 12 years old and settled in Virginia, near Washington, D.C. Lawrence's childhood and early adult years were apparently normal as was his behavior. At his trial, he was described by acquaintances and relatives as a "relatively fine young boy" who was "reserved in his manner; but industrious and of good moral habits." Lawrence later found work as a house painter. Historians have speculated that Lawrence’s exposure to the toxic chemicals used in paint in the 1800s (including lead, antimony, chromates, sulfides and barium) contributed to his mental illness, which manifested itself when he was in his thirties. Lawrence began exhibiting dissociative behavior and violent tendencies, especially towards his siblings.

== Life, and mental health issues ==
By November 1832, Lawrence's behavior and mental stability had inexplicably changed. He abruptly announced to his family that he was returning to England, and he left Washington D.C. shortly thereafter. He returned a month later telling his family he had decided not to travel abroad as it was too cold. Shortly after returning, he again announced that he was returning to England to study landscape painting.

Lawrence left once again and briefly stayed in Philadelphia before returning home. He told his family that "unnamed persons" had prevented him from traveling abroad and that the U.S. government also disapproved of his plan to return to England. Lawrence also claimed that while he was in Philadelphia, he had read several stories about himself in the newspaper that were critical of his travel plans and his character. Lawrence told his family that he had no choice but to return to Washington until he could afford to buy a ship and hire a captain who would sail the ship to England for him.

Around this time, Lawrence abruptly quit his house painting job. When questioned by his sister and brother-in-law, with whom he was living, Lawrence claimed that, because the U.S. government owed him a large sum of money, he did not need to work. Lawrence had come to believe that he was owed money because he was Richard III of England and owned two English estates. Lawrence became convinced that President Andrew Jackson's opposition to the Second Bank of the United States was preventing the distribution of the money he believed he was owed. He felt that if Jackson were no longer in office, Vice President Martin Van Buren would establish a national bank and allow Congress to pay him the money for his English estate claims.

Lawrence's personality and outward appearance changed dramatically around this time. Once conservatively dressed, Lawrence grew a mustache and began buying expensive and flamboyant clothing, which he would change three or four times a day. He took to standing in the doorway of his home for hours and gazing out into the street. Neighborhood children would jokingly address him as "King Richard", which typically pleased Lawrence, who failed to realize the children were teasing him. He also became paranoid and hostile towards others. On one occasion, he threatened to kill a maid who he thought was laughing at him. Lawrence also began verbally and physically abusing his family, mainly his sisters, over imagined slights. In one instance, he threatened to hit his sister with a paperweight because he believed that she had been talking about him. At Lawrence's trial, witnesses described the bizarre behavior that he exhibited. Several people testified that Lawrence would engage in nonsensical conversations with himself, and others stated that he would have laughing and cursing fits.

== Assassination attempt ==
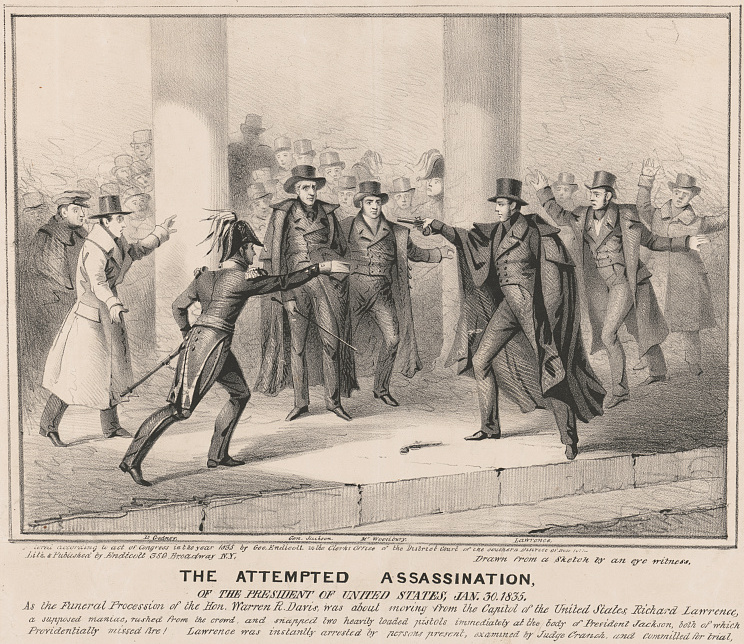
Etching of the assassination attempt

In the weeks leading up to the assassination attempt, Lawrence began observing Jackson's movements. Witnesses later testified that Lawrence was often seen sitting in his paint shop muttering to himself about Jackson. On Friday, January 30, 1835, the day of the assassination attempt, Lawrence was seen sitting in his paint shop with a book in his hand while laughing. Lawrence suddenly got up, left the shop and stated, "I'll be damned if I don't do it."

Later on that same day, Jackson was attending the funeral of South Carolina Representative Warren R. Davis at the U.S. Capitol. Lawrence originally planned to shoot Jackson as he entered the service but was unable to get close enough to him. However, by the time Jackson left the funeral, Lawrence had found a space near a pillar on the East Portico, where Jackson would pass. As Jackson walked by, Lawrence stepped out and fired his first pistol at Jackson's back; it misfired. Lawrence quickly made another attempt with his second pistol, but that also misfired. It was later determined that the weapons that he had chosen were noted for being vulnerable to moisture, and the weather on that date was humid and damp.

Lawrence's unsuccessful attempts were noticed by Jackson, who proceeded to beat Lawrence with a cane. The crowd, which included U.S. Representative Davy Crockett, eventually intervened and wrestled Lawrence into submission. Lawrence was the first person to attempt to kill a sitting U.S. president.

== Trial and commitment ==
Lawrence was brought to trial on April 11, 1835, at the District of Columbia City Hall. The prosecuting attorney was Francis Scott Key. At his trial, Lawrence was prone to wild rants and he refused to recognize the legitimacy of the proceedings. At one point he said to the courtroom, "It is for me, gentlemen, to pass judgment on you, and not you upon me." After only five minutes of deliberation, the jury found Lawrence "not guilty by reason of insanity".

In the years following his acquittal, Lawrence was held by several institutions and hospitals. In 1855, he was committed to the newly opened Government Hospital for the Insane (later renamed St. Elizabeths Hospital), in Washington, D.C., where he remained until his death on June 13, 1861.

== Aftermath ==
As with later assassinations, there was speculation that Lawrence was part of a conspiracy. While nobody denied Lawrence's involvement, many people, including Jackson, believed that he might have been supported in or put up to carrying out the assassination attempt by the President's political enemies. U.S. Senator (and Jackson's former vice president) John C. Calhoun made a statement on the Senate floor that he was not connected to the attack. Nevertheless, Jackson believed that Calhoun, an old enemy, was at the bottom of the attempt.

Jackson also suspected a former friend and supporter, Senator George Poindexter of Mississippi, who had used Lawrence to do some house painting a few months earlier. Because Poindexter was unable to convince his supporters in Mississippi that he was not involved in a plot against Jackson, he was defeated for re-election. However, no evidence was ever discovered that connected Lawrence with either Calhoun or Poindexter in a plot to kill Jackson.

== Sources ==
- Clarke, James W. (2012). Defining Danger: American Assassins and the New Domestic Terrorists. New Brunswick, NJ: Transaction Publishers. ISBN 978-1-4128-4590-8. OCLC 743040369.
- Johnson, Scott Patrick (2010). Trials of the Century: An Encyclopedia of Popular Culture and the Law, Volume 1. Santa Barbara, CA: ABC-CLIO. ISBN 978-1-59884-261-6. OCLC 702674902.
- Oliver, Willard M. & Marion, Nancy E. (2010). Killing the President: Assassinations, Attempts, and Rumored Attempts on U.S. Commanders-In-Chief. Santa Barbara, CA: ABC-CLIO. ISBN 978-0-313-36474-7. OCLC 733346450.
- Regan, Chris (2008). Mass Historia: 365 Days of Historical Facts and (Mostly) Fictions. Kansas City, MO: Andrews McMeel Publishing. ISBN 978-0-7407-6869-9. OCLC 172521785.
