= Władysław Gurowski =

Polish noble

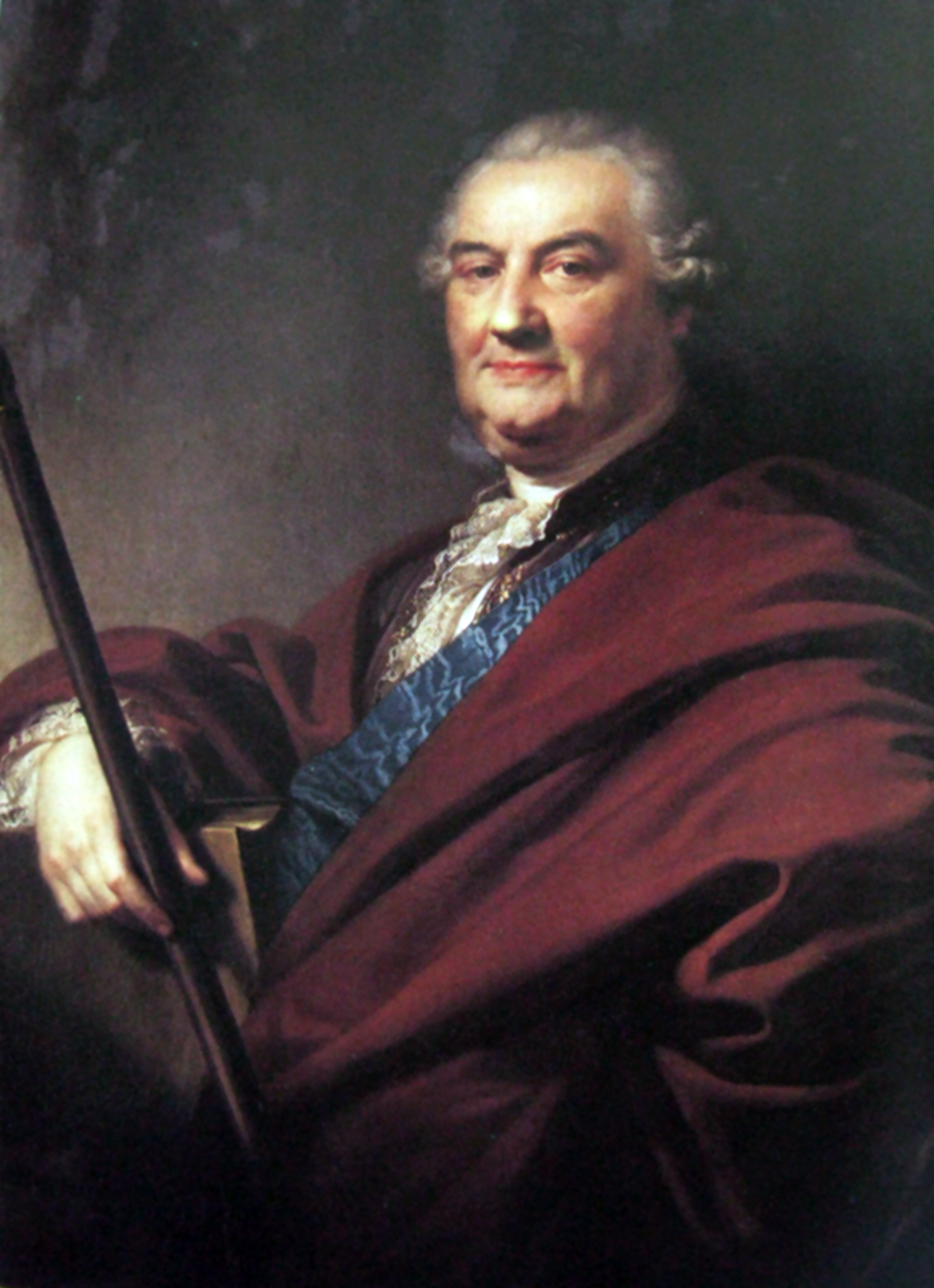
Władysław Gurowski

Władysław Gurowski (1715 – 23 May 1790) was a noble of the Polish–Lithuanian Commonwealth. Chamberlain of Polish king Augustus III of Poland from 1758; Great Crown Clerk from 1764; Court Lithuanian Marshal from 1768; Great Lithuanian Marshal from 1781.

In Polish politics he was one of the most outspoken supporters of Russian dominance in Polish–Lithuanian Commonwealth.

In June 1772, Gurowski was awarded the Order of St. Stanislaus and the Order of the White Eagle. In 1774 he was awarded the Order of St. Alexander Nevsky.
