= Dionizy Poniatowski =

Dionizy Poniatowski (1750–1811) was a Polish 18th century military commander and a high-ranking commander of the Polish Army during the Kościuszko's Uprising. A relative of the king Stanisław August Poniatowski, Dionizy Poniatowski served in the Royal Horse Guards Regiment since 1765. He passed all ranks from a mere cadet to a Colonel and the commanding officer of the unit. He took part with his unit in the Warsaw Uprising (1794), for which Tadeusz Kościuszko promoted him to the rank of Major General. In 1795 he was made a Knight of the Order of Saint Stanislaus.
