= Battle of Chełm =

Battle of the Kościuszko Uprising

Coordinates: 51°08′N 23°39′E

- Part of the Kościuszko Uprising
Date	8 June 1794
Location	Chełm, present-day Poland
Result	Russian victory

Belligerents
(Russia) Russian Empire	Poland-Lithuania (Kosciuszko rebels)

Commanders and leaders
Wilhelm Derfelden; Petrowicz Zagriażski	Józef Zajączek

Strength
16,500 men 24 cannons	6,000; 14 cannons 2,000 peasant soldiers

Casualties and losses
200	1,400–1,600

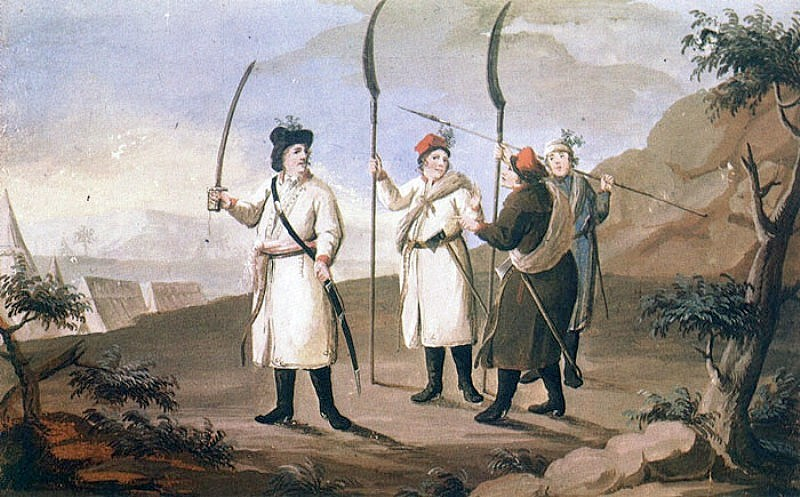
Peasant militia of 1794 by Michał Stachowicz

The Battle of Chełm was fought on 8 June 1794 between Poland and the combined forces of the Russian Empire and Prussia. The Polish were led by Józef Zajączek, the Russo-Prussian forces by Petrowicz Zagriażski and Wilhelm Derfelden. The Russo-Prussian forces consisted of 16,500 soldiers, and 24 cannons, while the Polish general only had about 6,000 soldiers, 14 cannons, and 2,000 peasant soldiers armed with war scythes.

Zajączek occupied the forested hills 1.5 km away from the city. In the early noon the Russian troops started the attack. After several hours of fighting Zajączek could only try to save as much of his army as possible through a withdrawal. In the battle, the Polish forces lost between 1,400 and 1,600 men. The Russian forces lost only about 200 men and were victorious.

== Literature ==
- Andrzej Grabski, Jan Wimmer u. a..: Zarys dziejów wojskowości polskiej do roku 1864. Wydawnictwo Ministerstwa Obrony Narodowej, Warschau 1966
- Marian Kukiel: Zarys historii wojskowości w Polsce. Puls, London 1993, ISBN 0-907587-99-2.
- Andrzej Zahorski: Wypisy źródłowe do historii polskiej sztuki wojennej. Polska sztuka wojenna w okresie powstania kościuszkowskiego. Wydawnictwo Ministerstwa Obrony Narodowej, Warschau 1960
- Bolesław Twardowski: Wojsko Polskie Kościuszki w roku 1794. Księgarnia Katolicka, Poznań 1894
- Mała Encyklopedia Wojskowa. Wydawnictwo Ministerstwa Obrony Narodowej, Warschau 1967, (Wydanie I Tom II).
