= History of the Polish Army =

The Polish Army (Polish: Wojsko Polskie) is the name applied to the military forces of Poland. The name has been in use since the early 19th century, although it can be used to refer to earlier formations as well. Polish Armed Forces consist of the Army (Wojsko Lądowe), Navy (Marynarka) and Air Force (Lotnictwo) branches and are under the command of the Ministry of National Defense (Ministerstwo Obrony Narodowej).

== History ==
=== Kingdom of Poland (10th century–1569) ===
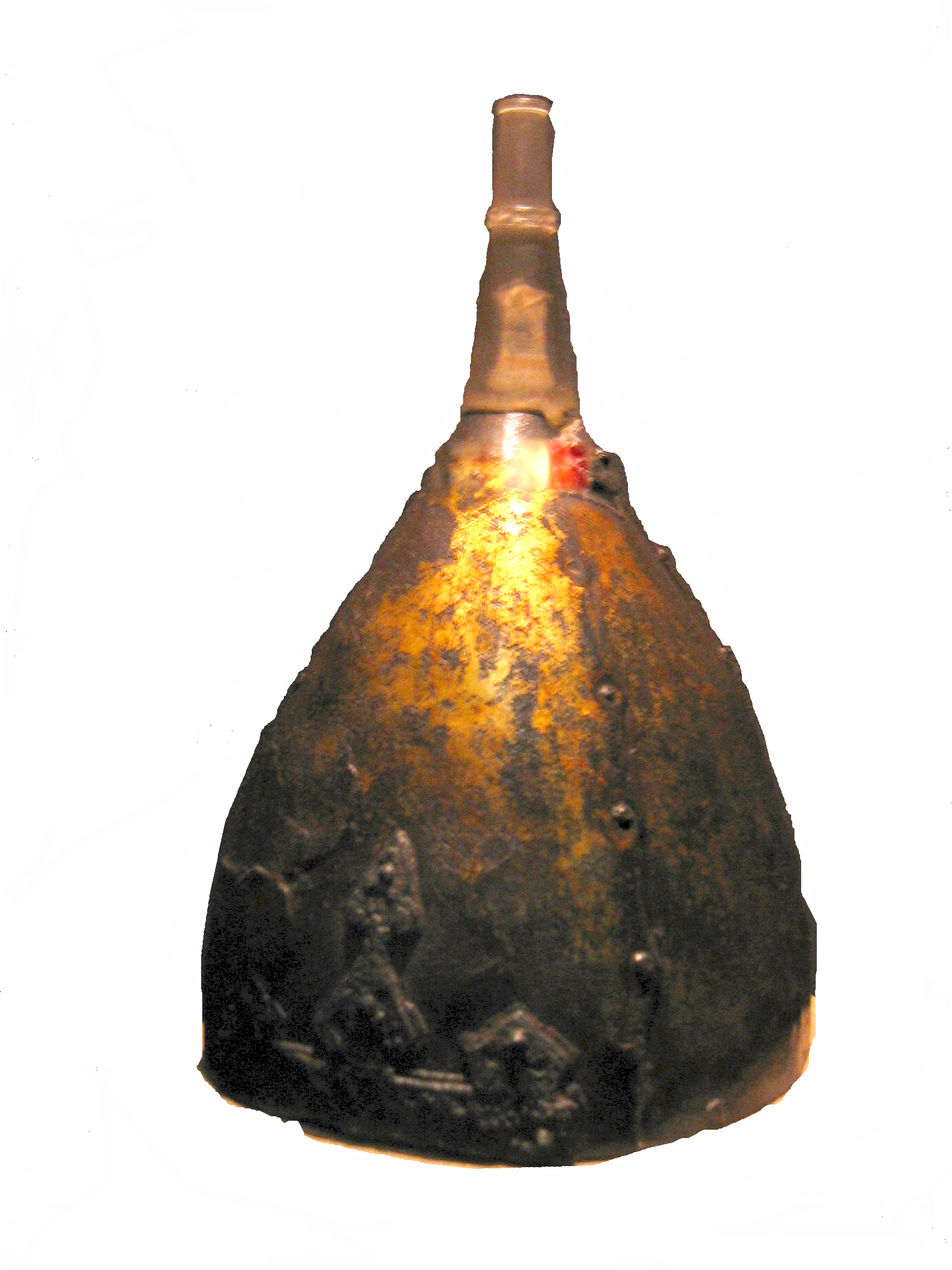
Helmet of Polish drużyna from the 10th century

The first Polish Army was created in the 10th-century kingdom of Poland, under the Piast dynasty. The prince's forces were composed of a group of armed men, usually mounted, named drużyna. Their key role was the protection of the monarch and supporting the taxation effort. Their organisation was similar to other such armed units of other Slavic rulers, and were often of foreign origin.

With time, the early tribal warriors gave rise to knights and eventually, by the 15th century, the whole social class of the szlachta or Polish gentry. The Polish gentry formed a distinct element within the ancient tribal groupings. This is uncertain, however, as there is little documentation on the early history of Poland, or of the movements of the Slavonic people into what became the territory so designated.

Around the 14th century, there was little difference between those called knights and those referred to as szlachta in Poland. Members of the szlachta had the personal obligation to defend the country (pospolite ruszenie), and thereby became the kingdom's privileged social class. It was they who were obliged to build and support castles as well as to keep peace and order on territory they were assigned.

=== Polish–Lithuanian Commonwealth (1569–1795) ===
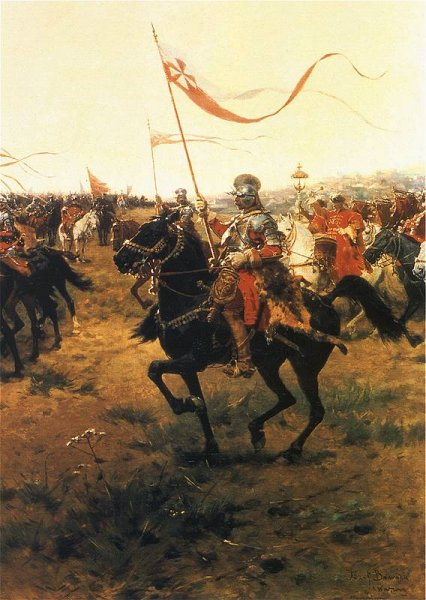
Depiction of a Commonwealth husaria.

The armies of the Polish–Lithuanian Commonwealth, or the First Polish Republic, were commanded by four hetmans. The armies comprised:

- Wojsko kwarciane: Regular units with wages paid from taxes (these units were later merged with the wojsko komputowe)
- Wojsko komputowe: Semi-regular units created for times of war (in 1652 these units were merged with the wojsko kwarciane into a new permanent army)
- Pospolite ruszenie: Szlachta levée en masse
- Piechota łanowa, piechota wybraniecka and piechota dymowa: Units based on peasant (later, townsfolk) recruits
- Registered Cossacks: Troops made up of Cossacks, who were recruited until 1699; included many infantry
- Royal guard: A small unit whose primary purpose was to escort the monarch and members of his family
- Mercenaries: As with most other armies, hired to supplement regular units
- Private armies: Usually paid for and equipped by magnats or cities

Some units of the Commonwealth used fairly unusual tactics. These units included:

- Husaria: heavy cavalry armed with lances; their charges were extremely effective until advances in firearms in the late 17th century substantially increased infantry firepower.
- Cossacks: general name for all Commonwealth units of light cavalry, even if they did not contain a single ethnic Cossack; fast and maneuverable like oriental cavalry units of Ottoman Empire vassals, but lacking the firepower of European cavalry such as the Swedish rajtars.
- Tabor: military horse-drawn wagons, usually carrying army supplies. Their use for defensive formations was perfected by the Cossacks, and to a smaller extent by other Commonwealth units.

=== Army without a country (1795–1918) ===
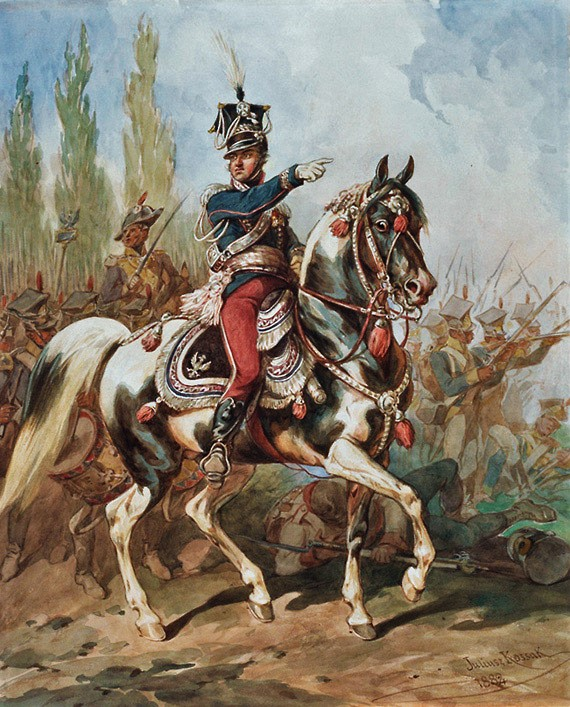
Jan Henryk Dąbrowski, commander of the Polish Legions during the Napoleonic Wars.

After partitions of Poland, during the period from 1795 until 1918, Polish military was recreated several times in Poland during uprisings like the November Uprising of 1830 and the January Uprising in 1863, and outside Poland like during Napoleonic wars (Polish Legions in Italy). The Congress Kingdom of Poland, ruled by Russian Tsars with a certain degree of autonomy, had an Army in the years 1815-1830 which was disbanded after the unsuccessful insurrection.

Large numbers of Poles also served in the occupiers' armies: Austro-Hungarian (before 1867 Imperial Austrian), Imperial Russian and German armies (before 1871 Prussian). However, these powers took care to spread Polish soldiers all over their armies and as a rule did not form predominantly Polish units.

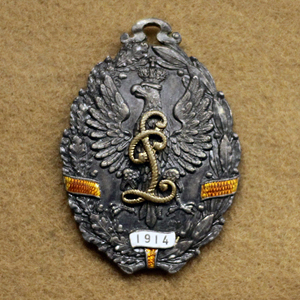
Puławy Legion

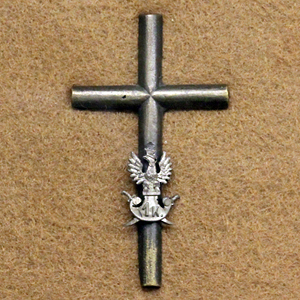
Polish First Corps in Russia

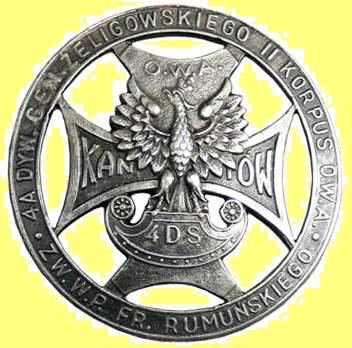
4th Rifle Division badge

During World War I, the Polish Legions were set up in Galicia, the southern part of Poland under Austrian occupation. They were both disbanded after the Central Powers failed to provide guarantees of Polish independence after the war. General Józef Haller, the commander of the Second Brigade of the Polish Legion, switched sides in late 1917, and via Murmansk took part of his troops to France, where he created the Blue Army. It was joined by several thousand Polish volunteers from the United States. It fought valiantly on the French front in 1917 and 1918.

=== Second Polish Republic and World War II (1918–1945) ===
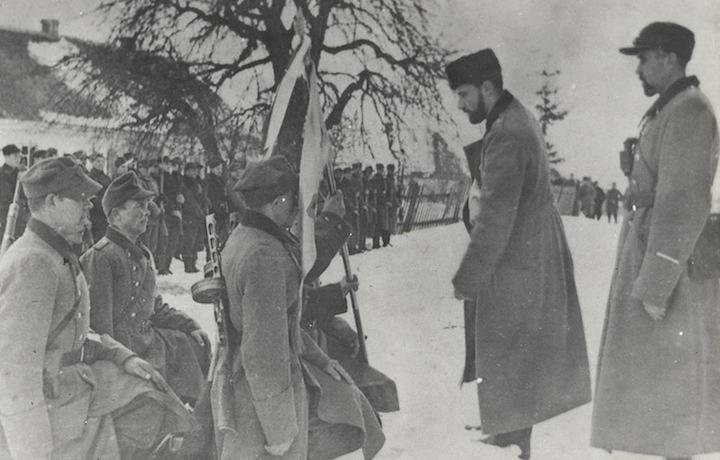
Home Army recruits taking an oath, 1944. The Home Army was a Polish resistance movement in World War II.

When Poland regained independence in 1918, it recreated its military which participated in the Polish–Soviet War of 1919-1922 and in World War II, 1939–1945. During the German occupation of Poland, a number of resistance movements were created, of which the Home Army was the most significant.

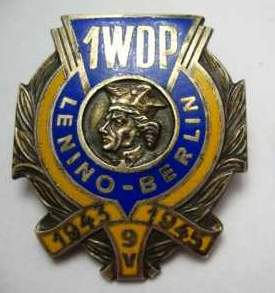
1st Tadeusz Kościuszko Infantry Division

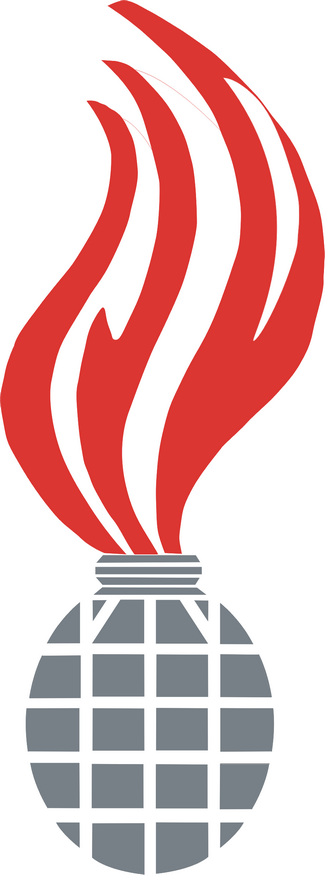
4th Infantry Division

=== People's Republic of Poland (1947–1989) ===
The Polish armed forces, then known as Polish People's Army, were part of the Soviet-controlled Warsaw Pact. Polish units took part in occupying Czechoslovakia in response to the Prague Spring in 1968. The command post for the invasion was actually located on Polish soil, at Marshal Ivan Yakubovsky's Legnica headquarters.

=== Third Polish Republic (1989–present) ===
After January 1990 the name of the armed forces was changed to 'Armed Forces of the Republic of Poland,' to accord with the Polish State's new official name.

In March 2003 the Polish Armed Forces took part in the 2003 invasion of Iraq, deploying 1500 personnel, special forces and a support ship (see Polish involvement in the 2003 invasion of Iraq).

Following the destruction of Saddam's regime the Polish Land Forces supplied a brigade and a division headquarters for the 17-nation Multinational Division Central-South, part of the U.S.-led Multi-National Force – Iraq. At its peak, Poland had 2,500 soldiers in the south of the country. Poland deployed about ten attack and transport helicopters as part of its force in Iraq between 2004 and 2008.

The troop number was reduced to 900 in 2006. Of the 900 soldiers, only 80 ever left their Forward operating base to conduct operations.

== See also ==
- History of Polish Intelligence Services
- List of wars involving Poland
