= Cossack cavalry =

Historical Polish cavalry formation

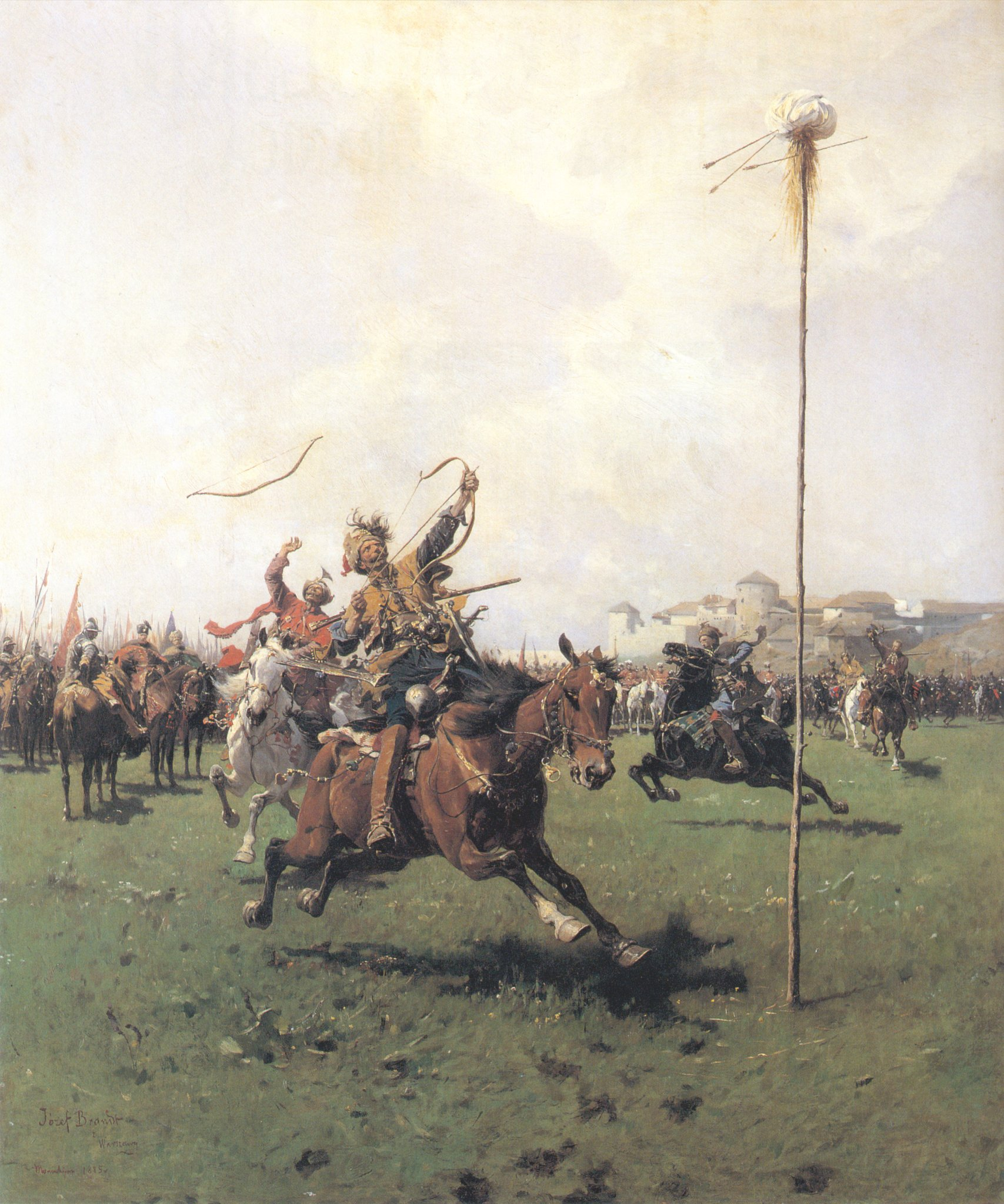
Józef Brandt, Lisowczyk: shooting with a bow, 1885. The image depicts archery exercises at a Lisowczyks camp, a unit of the Cossack cavalry.

Cossack cavalry (Polish: jazda kozacka) was a light and highly mobile cavalry formation with standardized arms and equipment, created in the Polish Crown Army in the mid-1500s to counter the recurring Tatar raids on Polish–Lithuanian territory. The main founder of this formation is considered to be Bernard Pretwicz, starosta of Bar and Terebovlia. The Cossack evolved in the mid-17th century into the formation known as the pancerni, and as such survived in the Polish Army until 1776.

Cossack cavalry's armament and fighting style were modelled on that of the Tatar forces, which at the time consisted almost entirely of lightly armed horsemen. The name of this cavalry was borrowed from the Crimean Tatar language, just like the term that, in the same period, came to be applied to the Zaporozhian Cossacks. Cossack cavalry had no other connection to the Zaporozhian Cossacks.

A mercenary unit of Cossack cavalry commanded by Aleksander Lisowski, known as the Lisowczyks, gained particular fame throughout Europe.

== History ==
=== Background ===
In the mid-15th century, the Tatars bordering the Kingdom of Poland from the southeast and organized into various political entities, the largest of which was the Crimean Khanate, began to raid Polish lands regularly, as well as the Grand Duchy of Lithuania and other states in the region. The raids, aimed solely at plunder, terror, and the capture of people, took place almost every year. According to the estimates of Dariusz Kołodziejczyk, between 1500 and 1700 they took about 2 million people from Slavic lands into captivity—around 7,000 people annually from the Polish-Lithuanian state.

The Tatar army was exceptionally mobile. Composed almost exclusively of cavalry, it was capable of covering 150–225 km per day and also avoided battles and sieges. The first major raid took place in 1468. The Polish army, relying on heavy cavalry and the noble levy, was unable to effectively oppose them. Retaliatory options were also limited, as the Tatars were Ottoman vassals and under their protection. The response, on the one hand, was to send so-called "gifts" to the Tatar khan to dissuade him from attacks, and on the other, to create a system of mobile defense forces known as the obrona potoczna.

These were permanent cavalry units paid from the royal treasury; however, due to limited funds, their numbers were relatively small (1,000–3,000), and they consisted of traditionally, moderately, and heavily armed horsemen. After initial failures, once tactics had been developed, a defensive line organized, and outposts moved into Lithuanian territory, the effectiveness of the obrona potoczna increased. In the years 1520–1547, the rate of successful defense against raids reached 80% in the Crown, but only 20% in the Grand Duchy of Lithuania.

=== Creation and development ===
An important role in this was played by the emergence, in the mid-16th century, of light cavalry known as Cossacks, as well as medium-armored cavalry the hussars. Bernard Pretwicz is considered the creator of the Cossack cavalry. Gaining experience under Mikołaj Sieniawski and later serving as the starosta of Bar and Terebovlia, he was effectively the commander of the southeastern borderlands of the Wild Fields. He came to the conclusion that the key to defense was light cavalry. He expressed this in a memorandum addressed to the king in 1550. In his units, Cossack cavalry soon began to dominate, and other frontier commanders followed his example. Somewhat earlier, similar experiments were carried out by the Kaniv starost Ostap Dashkevych, who reshaped the Lithuanian cavalry based on the Moscow-Tatar model.

The first Cossack soldiers appeared under Pretwicz in 1537. The first Cossack company was formed in 1544. In 1577, out of 2,859 cavalry in the kwarta army, as many as 2,009 were armed in the Cossack style. Until 1648, this cavalry formation was the second most numerous after the hussars, and from that year it became the most important.

== Armament and tactics ==
In 1574, Jan Andrzej Krasiński was one of the first describe the Cossack cavalry as follows:

The third type of horsemen are the Cossacks, who are very hardy when it comes to cold, hunger, and all kinds of hardship. They arm themselves very lightly, similarly to the Tatars. Their horses are very swift and suitable for small skirmishes. They arrange the saddles on their horses in such a way that they can easily turn in all directions and shoot with a bow. For fighting, they most often use the bow, striking enemy horsemen and horses with a hail of arrows. They also use sabres in the Eastern style and short shafts. In enemy territory they advance very quickly, destroying everything with fire and sword; and indeed, speed and the soldier’s safety are the basis of victory. Living in the vast Podolian steppes, where they fight constant wars with the Crimean Tatars, they carry all their provisions in their saddlebags, consisting of bread, smoked meat, and salt mixed with pepper. Each of them is also equipped with tinder and flint, so that if they happen to kill an animal (of which there are many in those deserted regions), they can immediately start a fire and roast their catch, seasoned with salt and pepper.

— Jan Andrzej Krasiński, Polska czyli opisanie topograficzno-polityczne Polski w wieku XVI oraz materyały do panowania Henryka Walezyusza,

This description shows the character, armament, and tactics of the Cossack cavalry. It relied on a rapid response to emerging Cossack bands, an initial clash followed by a pursuit, often all the way to Crimea, without a supply train or unnecessary equipment. They were equipped with bows (having abandoned firearms and crossbows), sabers, and rohatinas, and were protected by armor. Their tactic was to shower the enemy with arrows.

== Name ==
The word kozak first recorded in the 13th century ine the Crimean Tatar language, originally had several meanings. It referred to a guard or watchman of steppe caravans, as well as free mercenary soldiers who were not tied to any clan or ulus. Later, it came to denote simple bandits. The term was adopted by the Poles to describe their own horsemen who fought in the same manner as the Tatar kozaks, and independently it also came to designate the multi-ethnic group of free warriors and brigands living on the borderlands, who would later develop into the Zaporozhian Cossacks.

== Bibliography ==
- Bołdyrew, Aleksander; Łopatecki, Karol (2025). Meandry (r)ewolucji militarnej w Królestwie Polskim (1492-1569) [The Meanders of the Military (R)evolution in the Kingdom of Poland (1492–1569)] (in Polish).
- Głubisz, Bartosz (2016). Jazda kozacka w armii koronnej 1549-1696.
- Yakovenko, Natalia (2011). Historia Ukrainy do 1795 roku [History of Ukraine until 1795] (in Polish). Warsaw.
