= Michta =

Michta is a surname. Notable people with the surname include:

- Andrew A. Michta (born 1956), American political scientist
- Maria Michta-Coffey (born 1986), American race walker
- 20286 Michta, minor planet
