= Wojsko komputowe =

Military force in Poland–Lithuania

Wojsko komputowe (Polish pronunciation: [ˈvɔjskɔ kɔmpuˈtɔvɛ], comput army) is a type of military unit that was used in the Polish–Lithuanian Commonwealth from 1652 into the 18th century.

Until the mid-17th century, Polish forces were divided into permanent units (Polish: wojsko kwarciane) and supplemental units (Polish: wojsko komputowe or wojsko suplementowe), which were created in the time of military needs. In 1652 this distinction ceased, and both types of forces were merged into wojsko komputowe.

The etymology of the name is from Latin: computatio (account, calculation), and Old Polish Komput—an army budget which was voted for by the Commonwealth parliament, the Sejm.

Wojsko kwarciane was composed of various units.

Starting in the 1630s, there two so-called contingents (Autorament) in the military of the Polish–Lithuanian Commonwealth: National Contingent and Foreign Contingent. They were mostly split between Commonwealth-born soldiers and foreign mercenaries, respectively. The Diet voted to pay for a certain number of infantry and cavalry.

Personnel number (which was kept a state secret) varies, because often the commanders (hetmans) paid for additional manpower themselves. During peacetime, the Commonwealth komput army numbered about 12,000 for the Crown (Poland proper) and 6,000 for the Grand Duchy of Lithuania. During wartime it was increased to around 24,000–40,000 for the Crown and 8,000–22,000 for Lithuania.

In addition, wojsko kwarciane was supplemented with peasant-based recruits of piechota wybraniecka and from 1653, piechota łanowa, registered Cossacks (until 1699), pospolite ruszenie, royal guard, armies of magnates and cities, and wojsko ordynackie.

== Sources ==
- Michta, Andrew A. (1990). The Red Eagle: The Army in Polish Politics, 1944–1988. Hoover Institution Press. ISBN 0-8179-8861-0.
- Nolan, Cathal J. (2008-07-30). Wars of the Age of Louis XIV, 1650–1715: An Encyclopedia of Global Warfare and Civilization. ABC-CLIO. ISBN 978-0-313-35920-0.
