= Wojsko kwarciane =

Regular army of Poland–Lithuania

- Active: 1562–1652
- Disbanded: Disbanded in 1652; Replaced by Wojsko komputowe

Wojsko kwarciane (Polish pronunciation: [ˈvɔjskɔ kfarˈt͡ɕanɛ], Quarter Army, Latin: quartanus or quartianus miles) was the term used for regular army units of the Polish–Lithuanian Commonwealth. The name was used in 1562–1652.

== Formation ==
Wojsko kwarciane was formed from earlier obrona potoczna units.

=== Name ===
The term "quarter" in the name of the army (Polish: kwarta) comes from the type of the tax paid for their upkeep (kwarta tax): a quarter of income from the crown lands (królewszczyzny) was supposed to be used for that purpose. As monarchs usually leased their land to szlachta (or merchants, or Jews) for short-term benefits, they didn't have direct control over cash flow and this often resulted in corruption and delayed payment of military wages. Military commanders (hetmans) often had to pay the wages of wojsko kwarciane and hired mercenaries from their own purse. Sometimes disgruntled unpaid units formed confederations in order to lawfully collect their wages by force.

== History ==
The standing numbers of wojsko kwarciane varied by peacetime and wartime. On average, the peacetime army totalled about 2,500 cavalry. Besides this, there were the supplemental units raised for wartime, which were called wojsko suplementowe.

It was a relatively small standing army when compared with other contemporary countries, especially considering the Commonwealth's huge area. Commonwealth armies would almost always be stretched thin to defend its territory from its aggressive neighbours (Kingdom of Sweden, Tsardom of Russia, the Ottoman Empire and its vassals).

In 1632 new quarter or royal taxes (dupla) was created to pay for artillery units.

In 1652 wojsko kwarciane was replaced with wojsko komputowe.

== See also ==
- skarb rawski
- piechota wybraniecka (piechota łanowa)
- pospolite ruszenie

== Sources ==
- Frost, Robert I. (2000). The Northern Wars: War, State, and Society in Northeastern Europe, 1558–1721. New York: Longman. ISBN 978-0-582-06430-0.
- Michta, Andrew A. (1990). The Red Eagle: The Army in Polish Politics, 1944–1988. Hoover Institution Press. ISBN 0-8179-8861-0.
- Nolan, Cathal J. (2008-07-30). Wars of the Age of Louis XIV, 1650–1715: An Encyclopedia of Global Warfare and Civilization. ABC-CLIO. ISBN 978-0-313-35920-0.
