= Polish Army Museum =

Museum in Mokotów, Warsaw, Poland

Coordinates: 52°13′55″N 21°1′33″E

Museum of the Polish Army
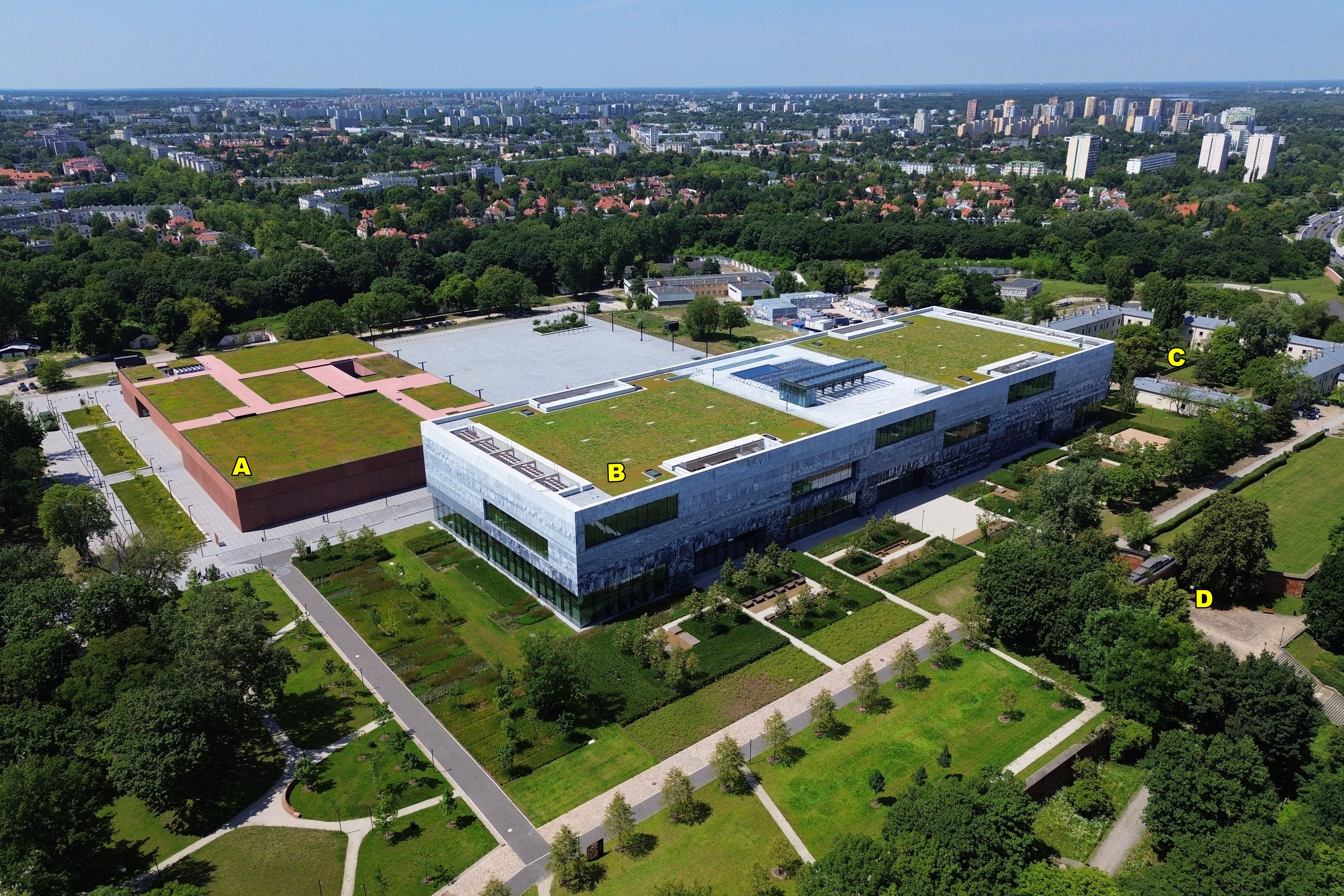
- New building of the Museum on the left (A)
- Established: 22 April 1920
- Location: Warsaw, Poland
- Website: www.muzeumwp.pl

Museum of the Polish Army (Polish: Muzeum Wojska Polskiego) is a museum in Warsaw documenting the military history of Poland. Established in 1920 under the Second Polish Republic, it formerly occupied a wing of the building of the Polish National Museum and now occupies a building of its own at the Warsaw Citadel, as well as several branches in Poland. It is Warsaw's second largest museum and the largest collection of military objects in Poland. The collection illustrates a thousand years of Polish military history, from the 10th century to the Second World War.

== Establishment ==
Decree about creation of Army Museum led by Bronisław Gembarzewski

Opened in 1920, the museum expanded in 1993 with the Museum of Katyn and the Museum of Polish Military Technology opened in the 9th Czerniakowski Fort.

== Collections ==
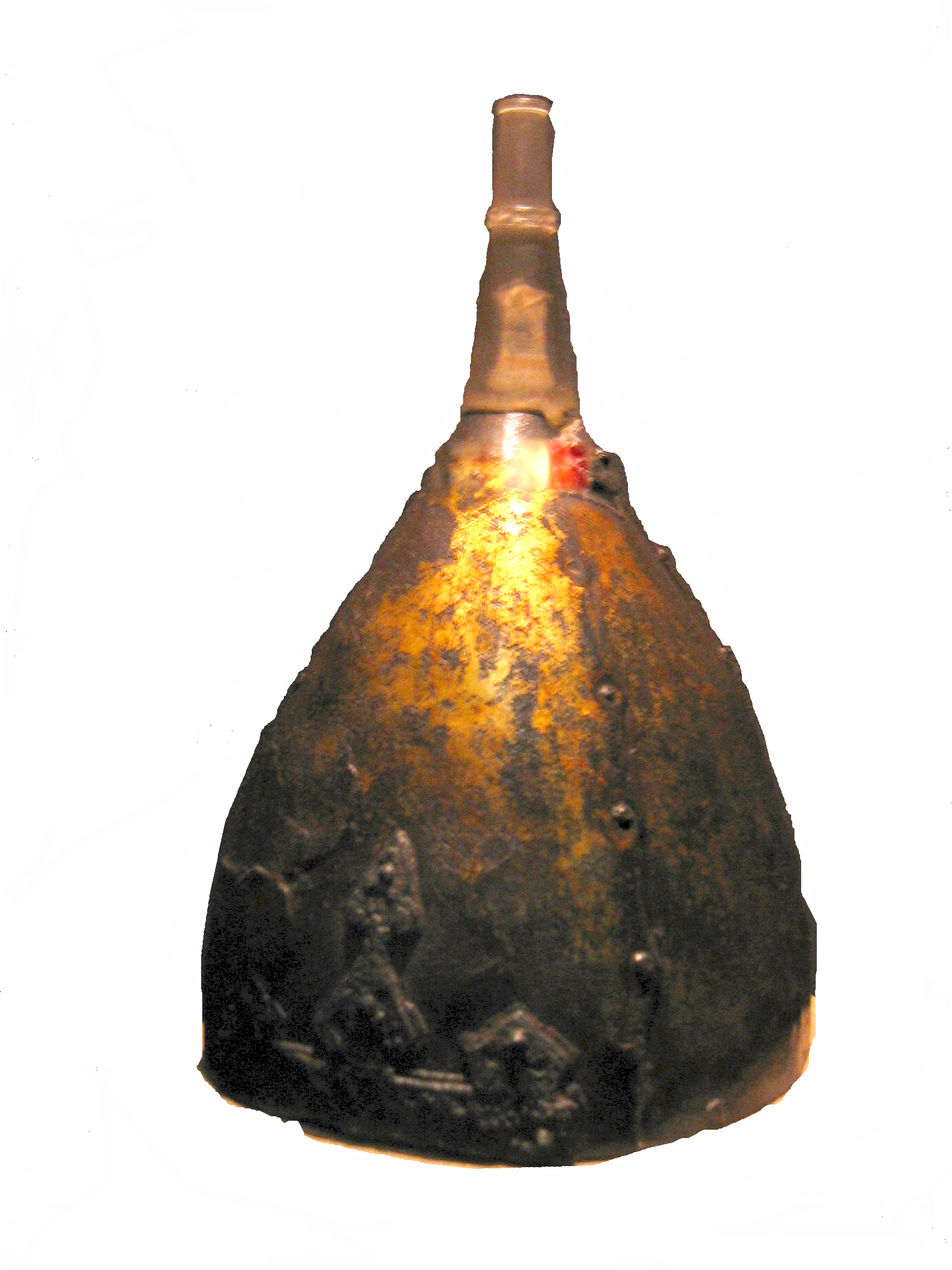
Polish helmet (szłom/szyszak), 10th century

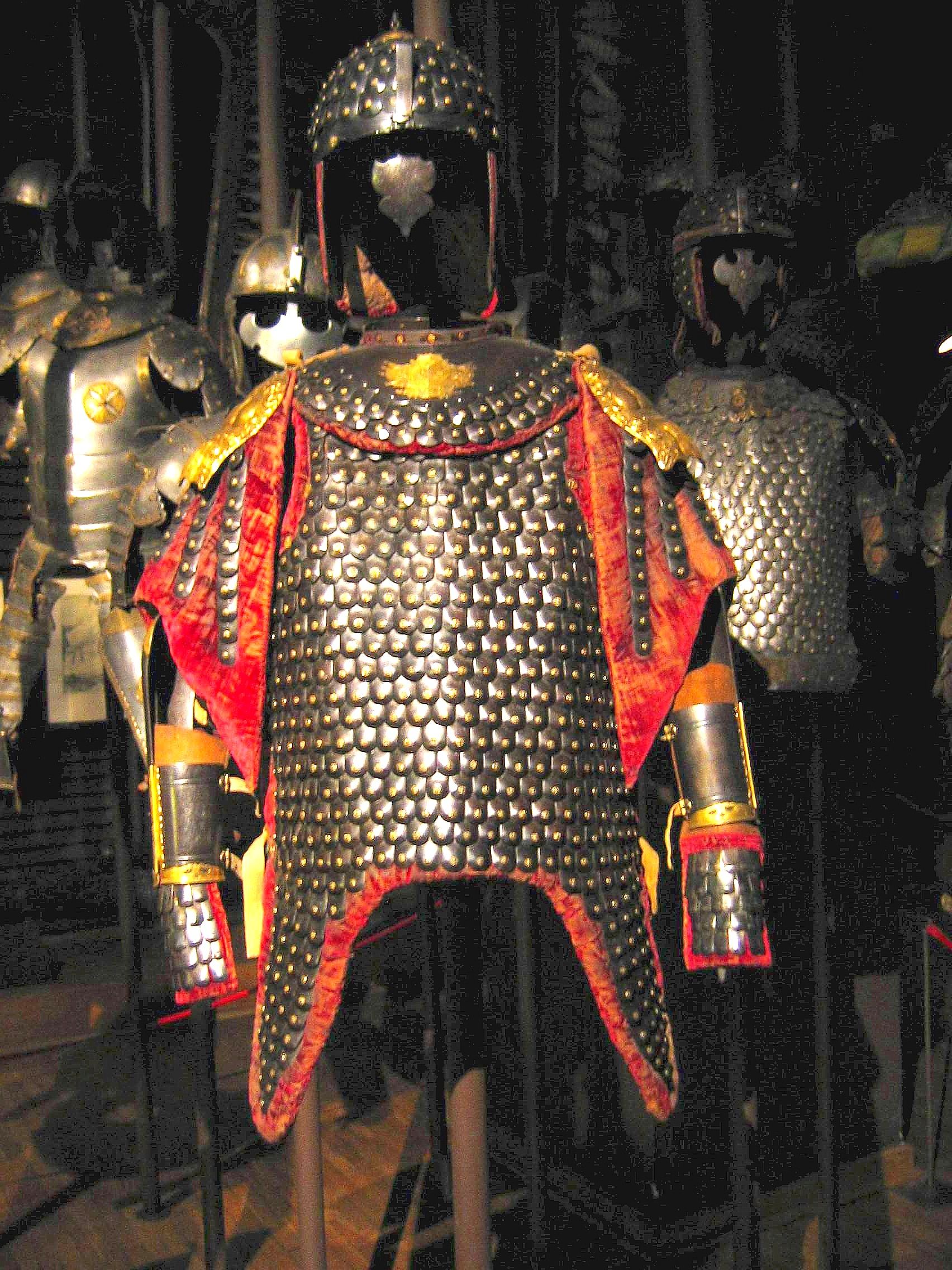
Karacena armour, 17th century

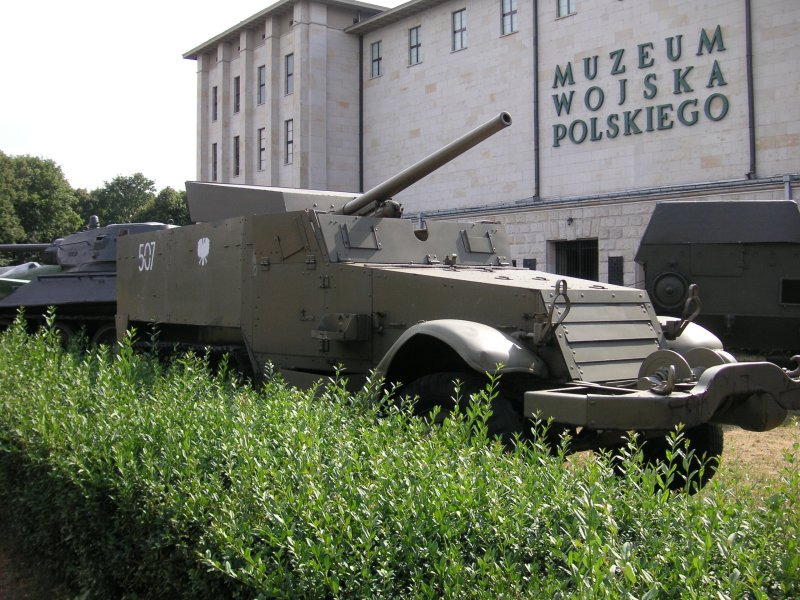
M-3 Halftrack in front of the museum

The forecourt of the museum houses several dozen armoured vehicles, artillery pieces and aircraft, an eclectic mix of Soviet, western and Polish equipment, mostly from the World War II era.

The indoor galleries concentrate on the military history of Poland since the 10th century, and are particularly strong on Poland's era of military greatness in the 17th century, through the decline into anarchy in the 18th century. Several rooms are devoted to Poland's part in the Napoleonic Wars, and the national uprisings of 1830-31 and 1863. By far the largest part of exhibition space is devoted to the 20th century, especially World War II. Highlights of the museum's collection include an extremely rare gilded helmet from the 10th century, which is said to have belonged to a Polish chieftain and the collection of hussars' armour.

Additionally there is a permanent exhibition of oriental arms and armour from the museum's own extensive collection, which includes many world-class items from Ottoman Turkey, the Crimean Tatar Khanate, Mongolia and Japan. The heavy weaponry is on display in the adjacent park and at the Fort Czerniakowski (Museum of Polish Military Technology, closed at present while it is being repaired). The park surrounding the museum is home to an open-air exhibition of heavy military equipment (tanks, artillery, aircraft and mine detection and diffusion). The Fort houses also the Museum of Katyń Victims, a subsidiary of the Polish Army Museum.

The museum was recently given the equipment from the soldiers lost in the presidential Smolensk aircraft crash. The equipment includes the ID Passes, portable radios, torches, holsters and much more all in their original state.

=== Permanent exhibitions ===
- Polish Armed Forces in the Middle Ages
- Polish Army at the Time of Renaissance
- History of the Old Polish Military: 1576–1648
- Polish Army in the Second Half of the 17th Century
- Polish Army in Saxon Times
- Polish Army at the Time of the Enlightenment and the Kosciuszko Rising
- Polish Legions in Italy and the Army of the Dukedom of Warsaw
- The Army of the Kingdom of Poland and the November 1831 Rising
- The January 1863 Rising
- Polish Paramilitary Organisations of the Early 20th Century
- The Roads to Independence: 1914–45
- The Polish Army: 1921–39
- Poland's Defence War of 1939
- The Armed Struggle in the Occupied Country: 1939–47
- Polish Army in the East: 1943–45
- UN Peace Missions of the Polish Army.

The museum is run as a department of the Polish armed forces, an arrangement which brings advantages - such as limitless access to military surplus stock - but also disadvantages (not least the lack of a proper giftshop/bookshop, since, by law Polish military facilities cannot sell goods to the public on a commercial basis).

== New Building ==
On December 15, 2008, the Museum of the Polish Army announced that it will sponsor an international competition to choose an architectural design for its new premises and surrounding area. The building will be built in the historic Citadel located in Warsaw's Żoliborz district. The new museum is expected to be a modern multimedia institution similar in concept to the highly successful Warsaw Uprising Museum. The winner was expected to be selected in August 2009, construction of the museum was supposed to begin in 2009 or 2010 and completion due in 2013. Due to delays, the new Polish Army Museum was inaugurated on 13 August 2023. The old museum site has been returned to the National Museum in Warsaw.

== Selected exhibition items ==
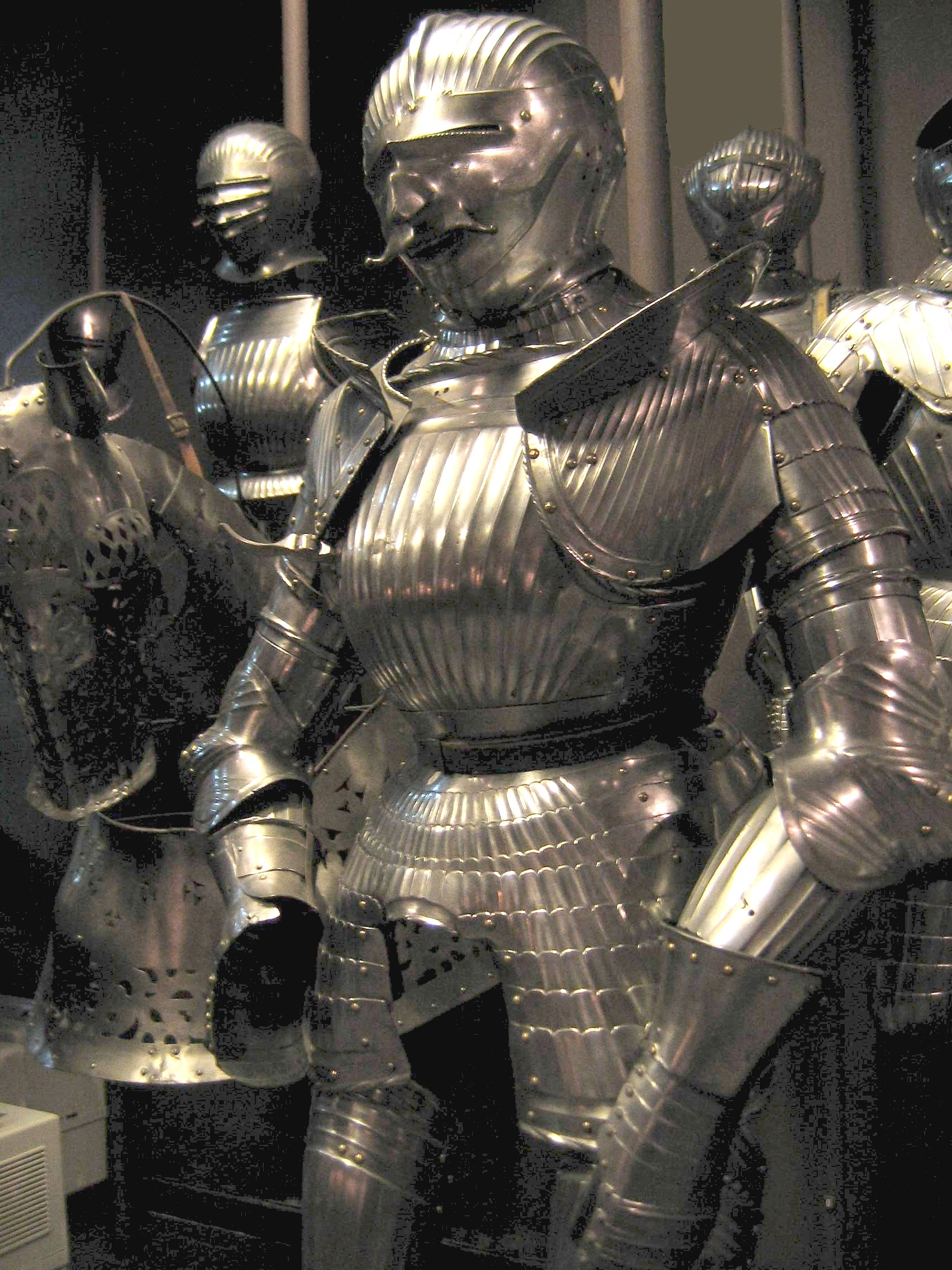
Polish plate armour, circa 1514

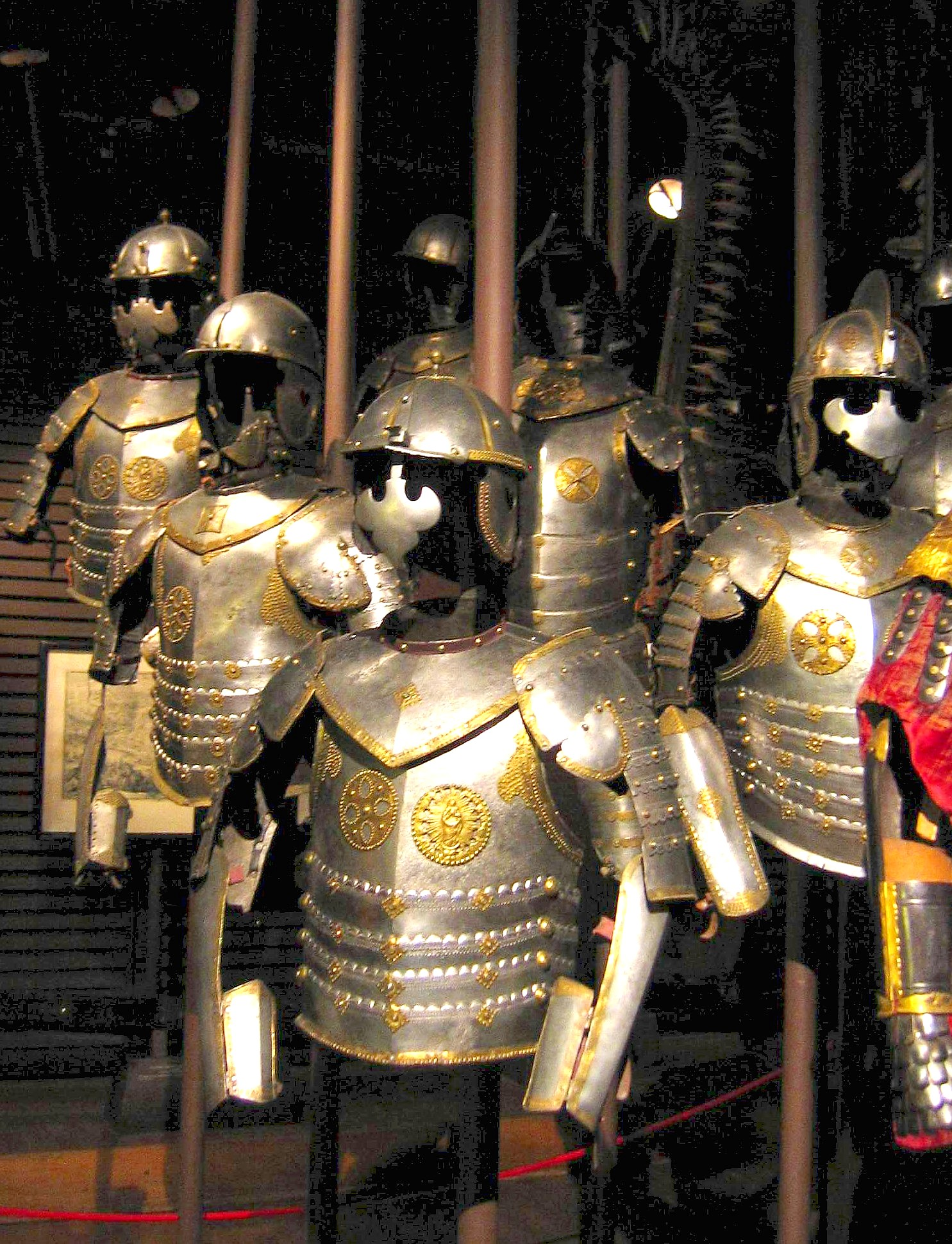
Polish hussars armours.

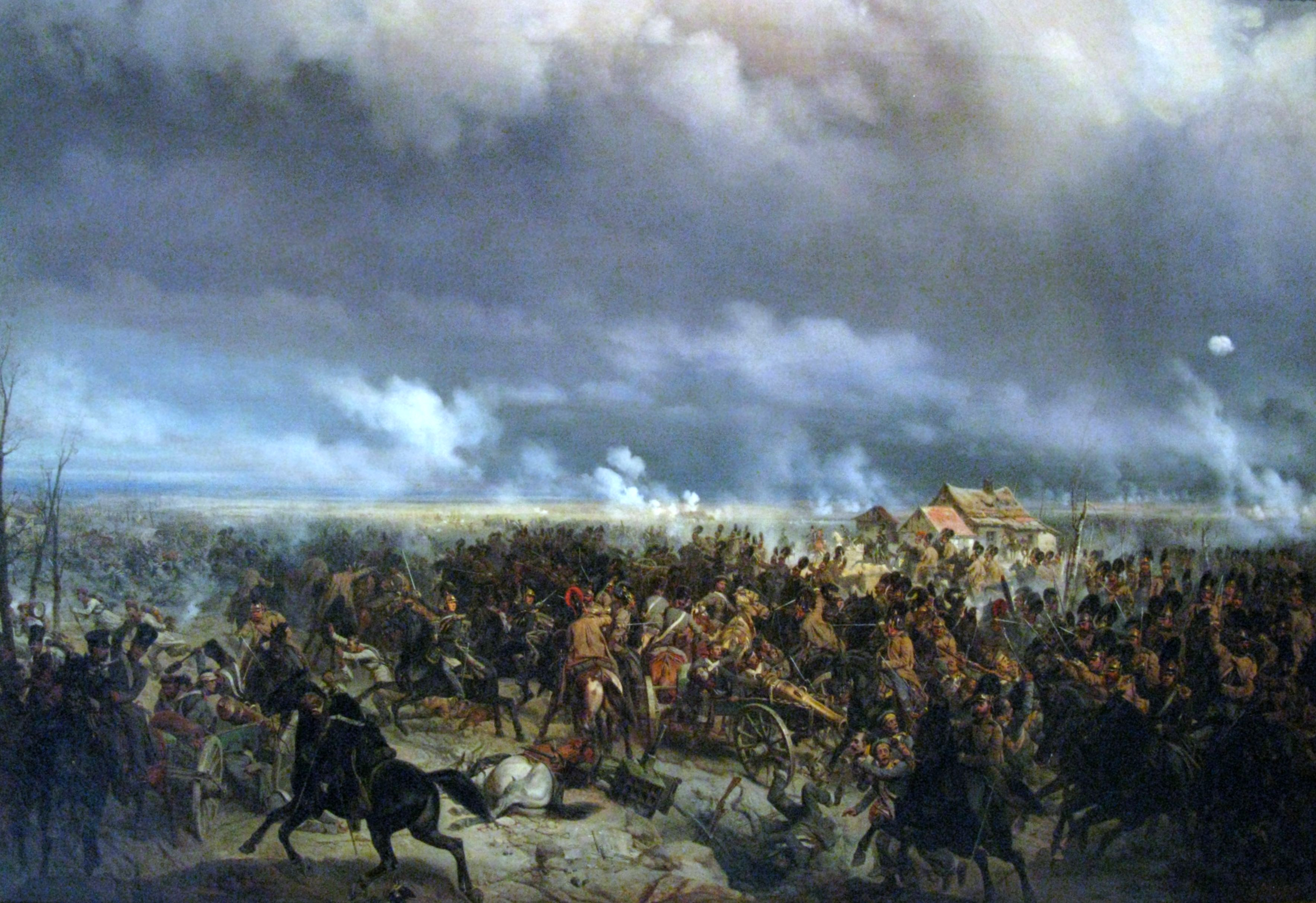
Battle of Grochów, 1831

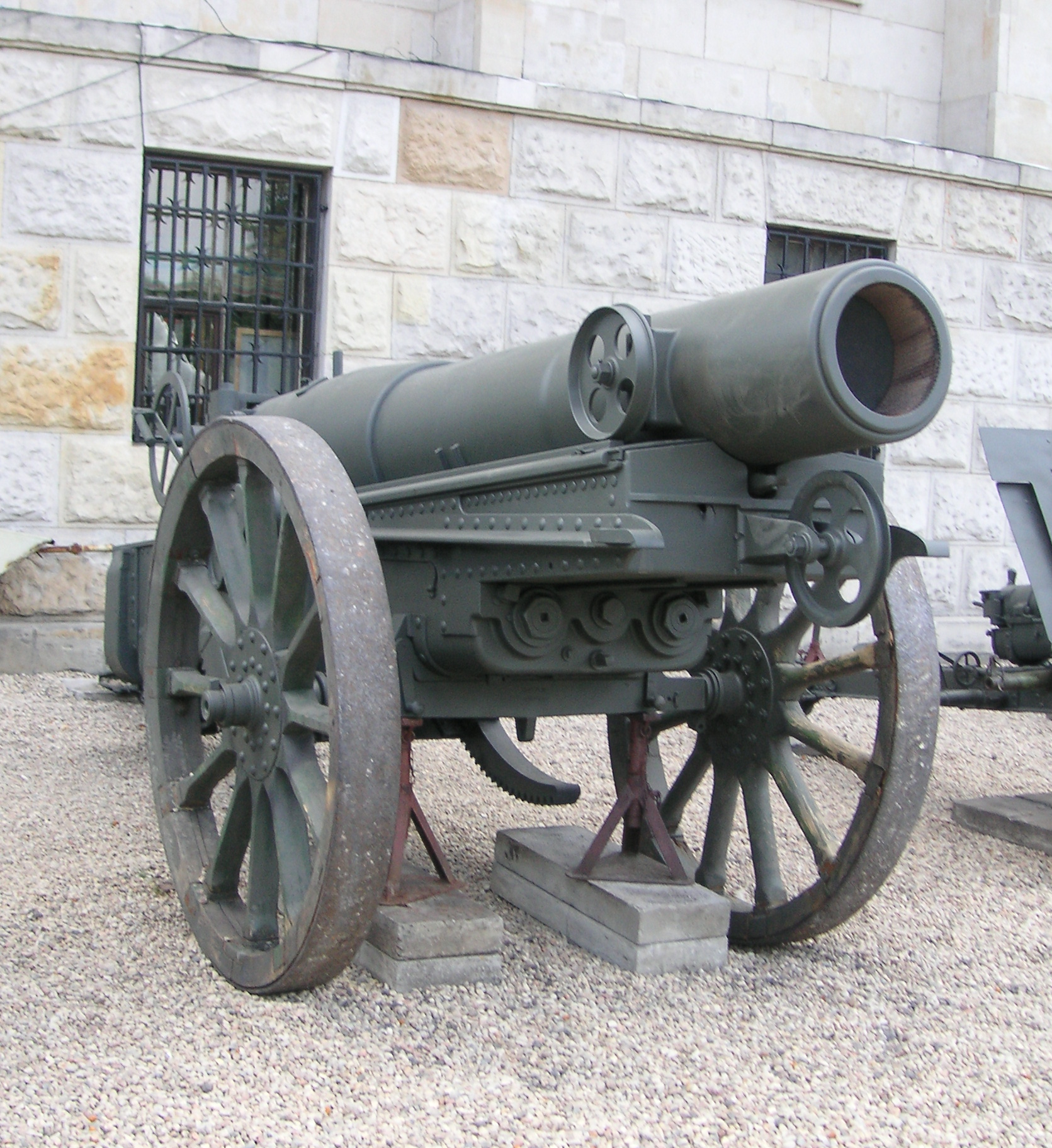
French World War I Mortier de 280 modele 1914 Schneider

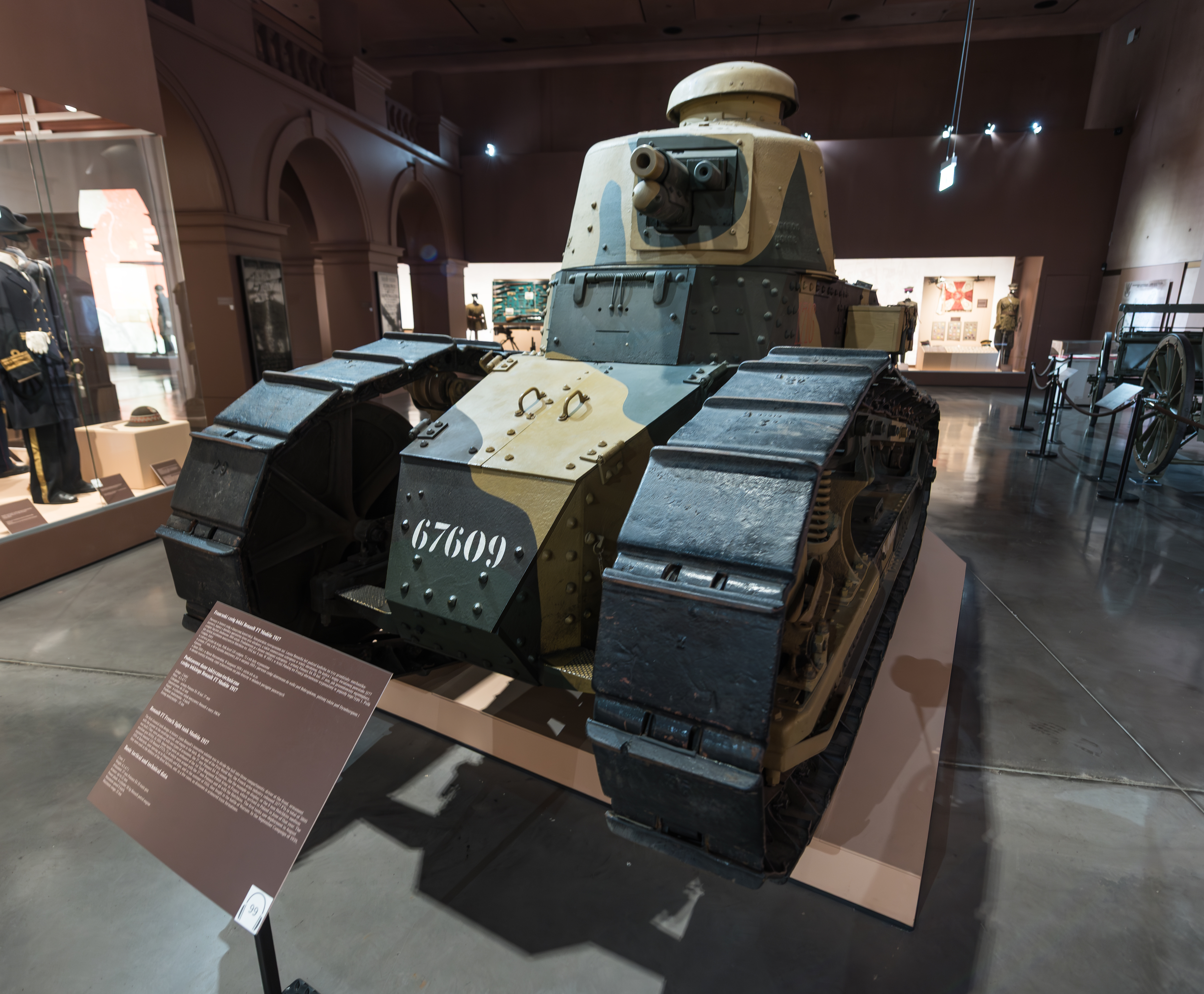
Renault FT tank

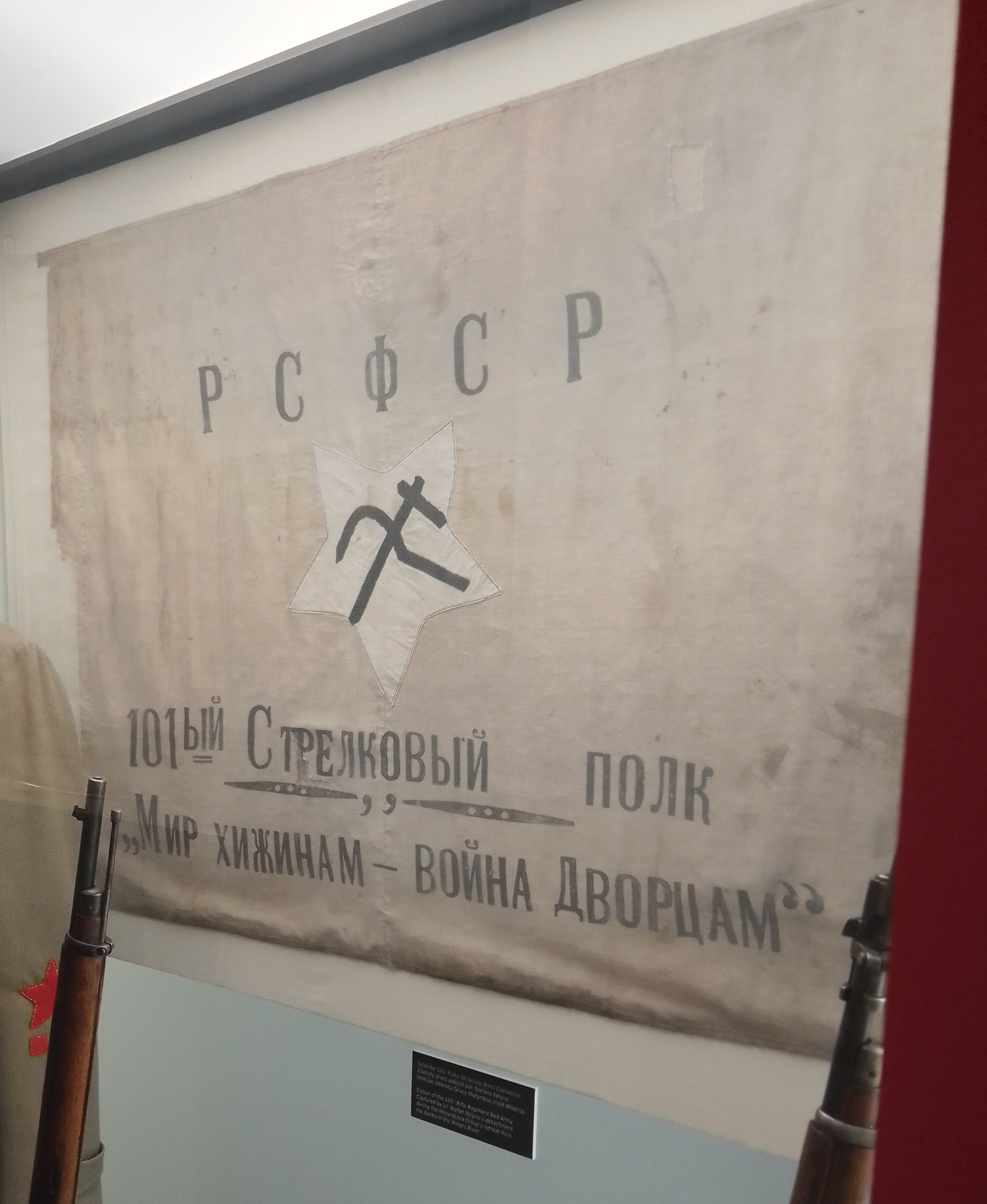
A captured Bolshevik flag from the 1920 war.

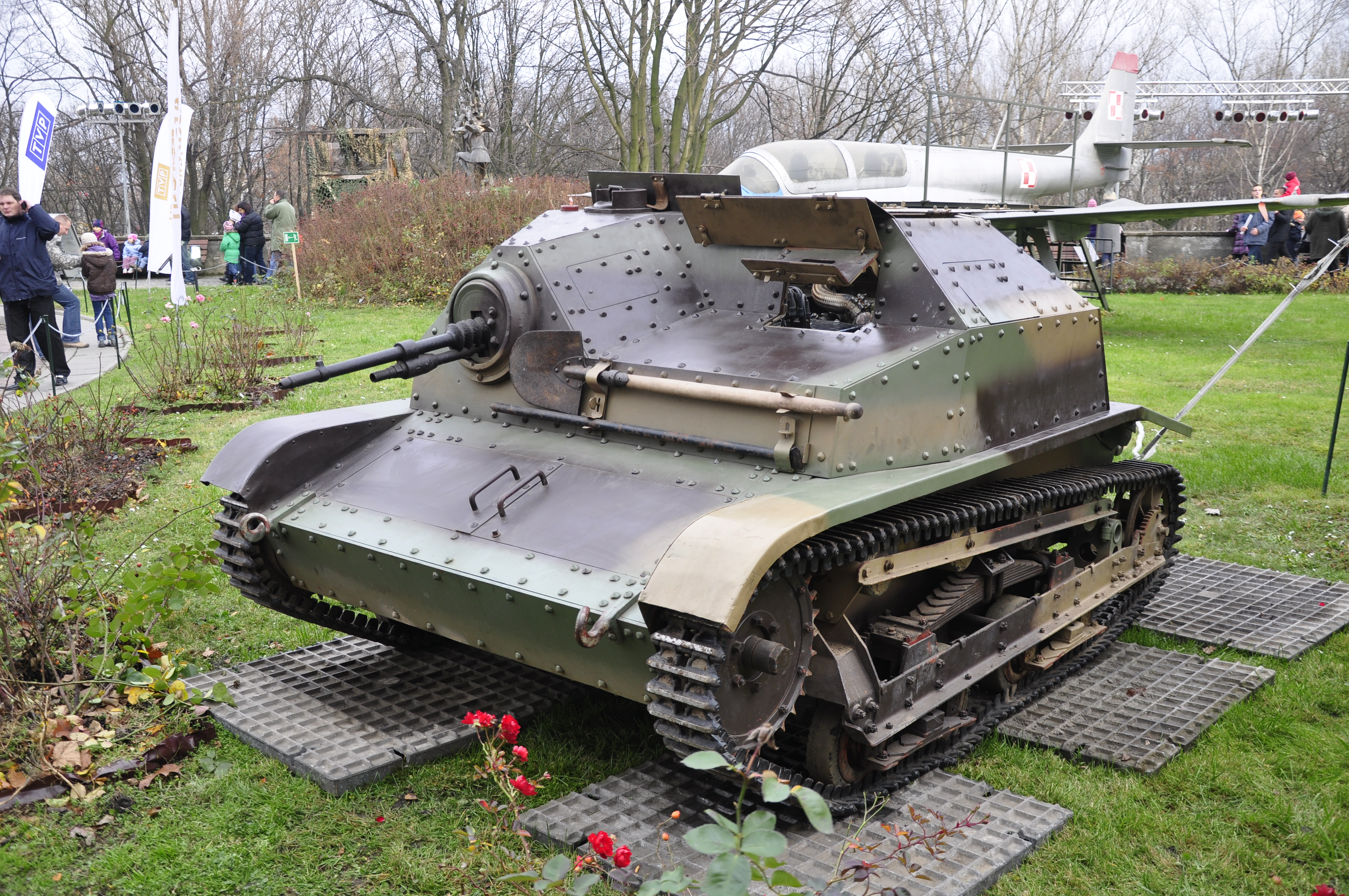
TKS Polish tankette during the Second World War.

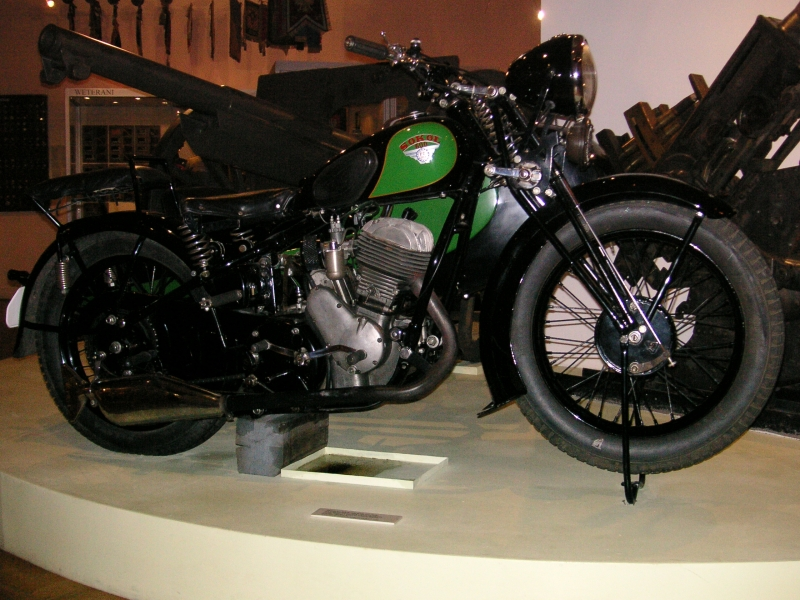
Polish Sokół 600 motorcycle

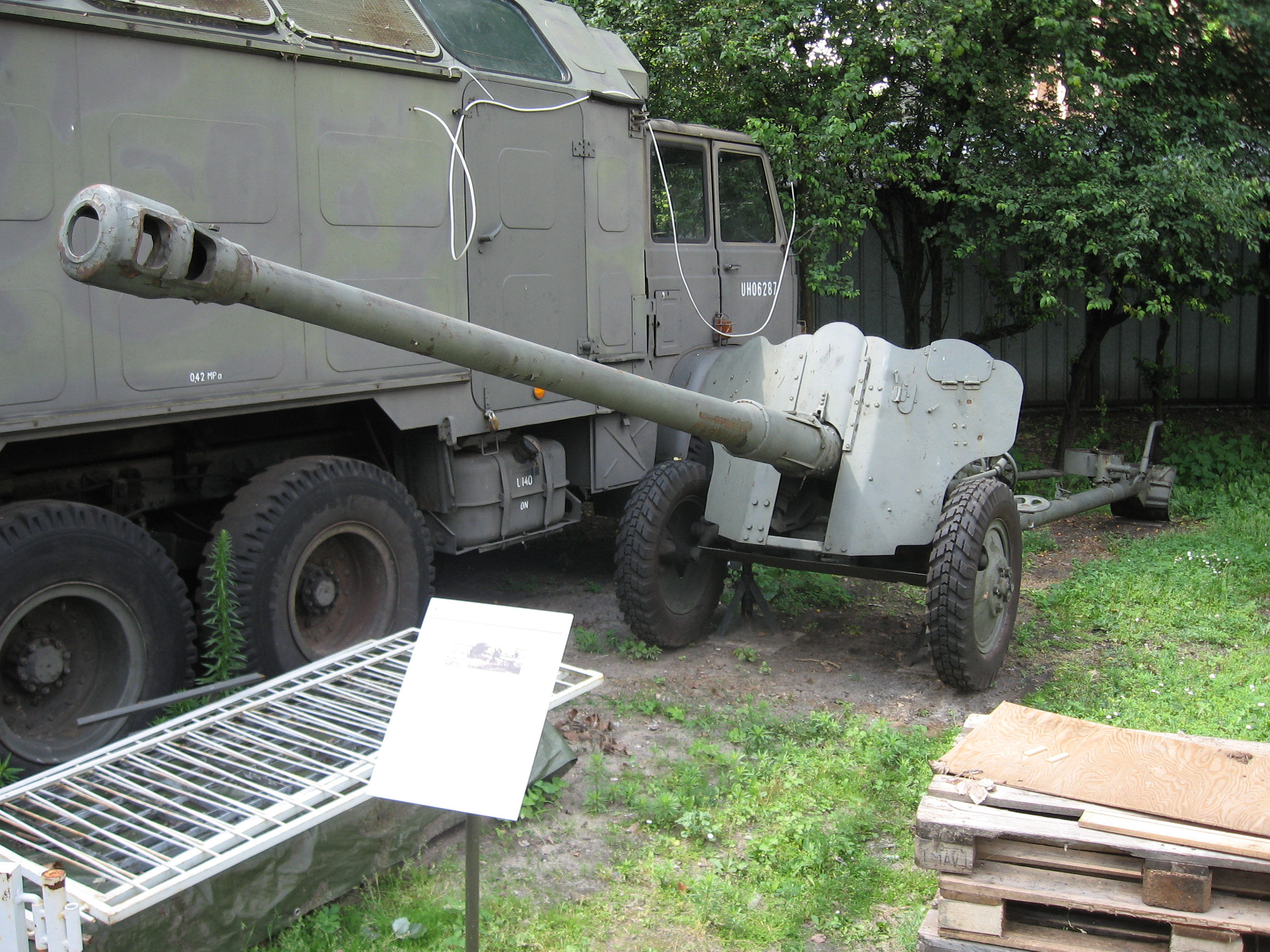
D-44 Field gun

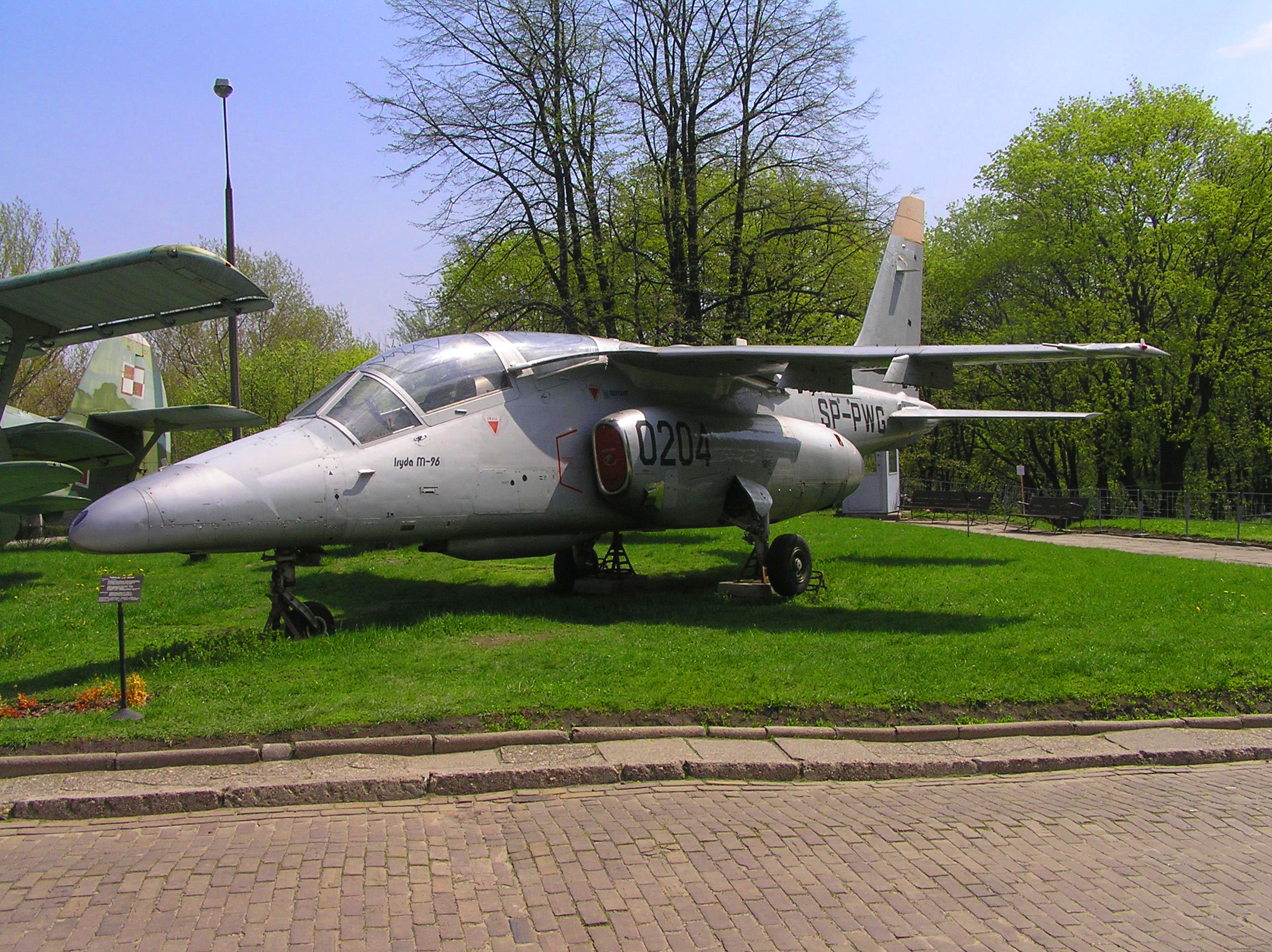
PZL I-22 Iryda light attack jet trainer

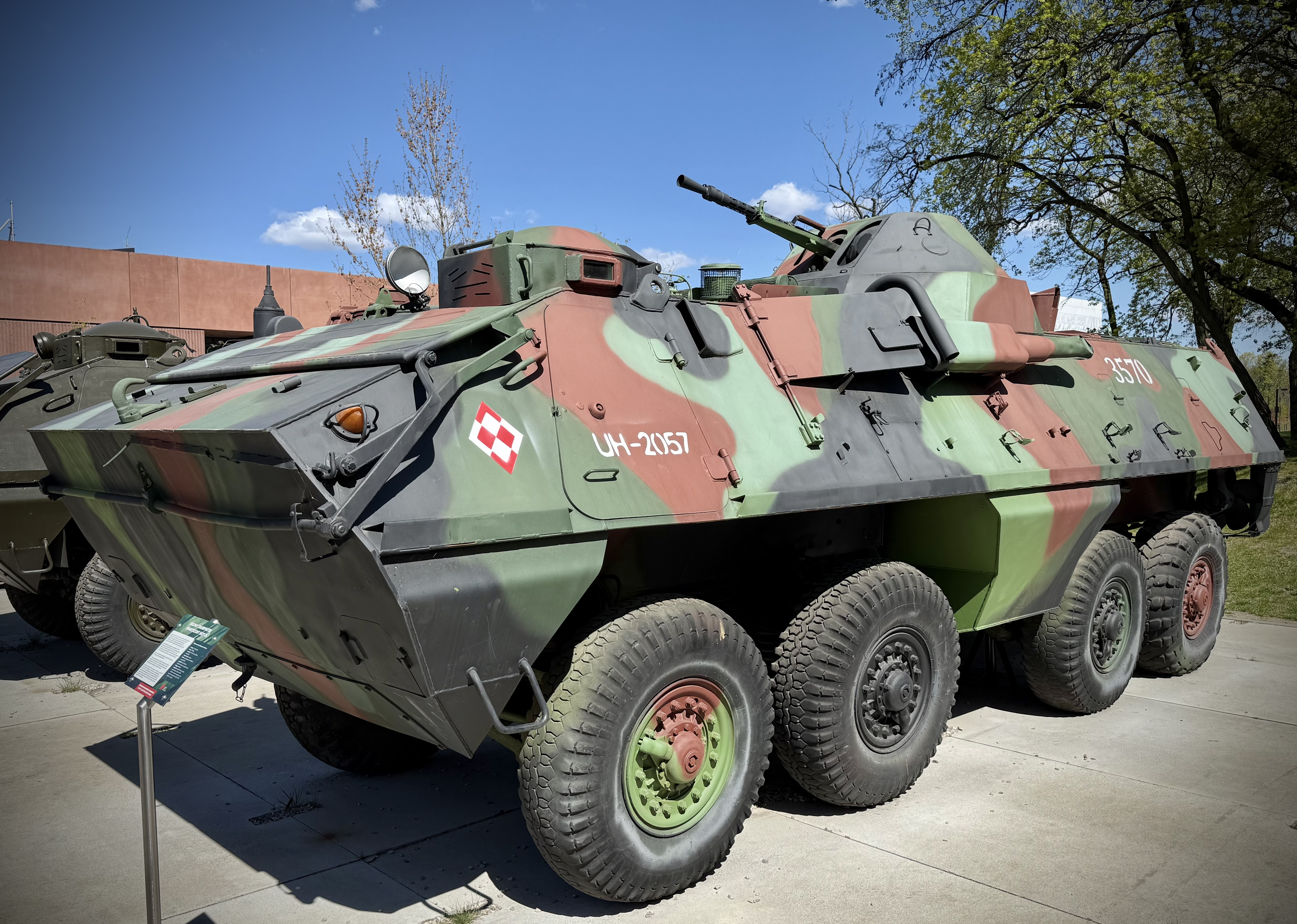
Skot-2A
