= Prittwitz =

Prittwitz coat of arms

The Prittwitz, Prittwitz-Gaffron or Pretwicz family is the name of a Silesian noble family of the Wczele coat of arms, whose first documented member is one Petrus de Prawticz from 1283.

According to older historiography, the family was of local Silesian origin, associated with Przybkowice (Prittwitz) near Kluczbork. According to more recent research by Tomasz Jurek, it was a family of Lusatian origin from Preititz. Originally, they used a crayfish or crab as their coat of arms, which they later changed to a shield divided diagonally; in the lower field there were stripes, and in the upper field a star. Eventually, they adopted the well-known Polish coat of arms Wczele. From the 15th century onward, they split into collateral branches, among them Hoyer, Hoger, and Gaffron.

One of the most well-known representatives of the family was Bernard Pretwicz, a member of the Prittwitz-Gaffron line, who made a career at the royal court in Poland as a rotmistrz of the royal army and commander of the defense of the eastern borderlands against the Tatars. His descendants settled in Poland, creating the Polish branch of the family.

== Notable members ==
- Bernard Pretwicz († 1561), officer in the service of the Polish Crown
- Carl Bernhard Baron von Prittwitz und Gaffron from the house of Lorzendorf (1735–1786), Royal Prussian Lieutenant Colonel, Chamberlain to Elisabeth Christine, Hofmarschall to the King of Prussia, Allod of Krippitz and Ulsche in Silesia
- Moritz Karl Ernst von Prittwitz (1795–1885), Royal Prussian Lieutenant-General of Infantry, Supervised the building of the large fortress in Ulm
- Ernst von Prittwitz und Gaffron (1833–1904), Royal Prussian Lieutenant-General
- Maximilian von Prittwitz (1848–1917), German general
- Friedrich Wilhelm von Prittwitz und Gaffron (1884–1955), German Ambassador to the United States under the Weimar Republic, from 1928 until April 14, 1933
- Heinrich von Prittwitz und Gaffron (1889-1941), German general killed during the Siege of Tobruk as a Commander of the 15th Panzer Division

== Bibliography ==
- Sękowski, Roman (2020). Herbarz szlachty śląskiej. Informator genealogiczn-heraldyczny. Vol. 7. Opole.
