= Wczele coat of arms =

Polish coat of arms

Wczele
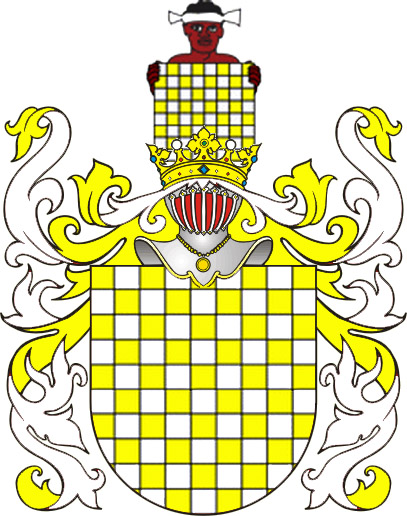
- Battle cry: Wczele, Wszczele
- Alternative names: Szachownica, Szczela, Wczela, Wszczele, Wszczelic, Łębno
- Earliest mention: 1368
- Towns: none
- Families: 84 names altogether: Berkowski, Cema, Ceyma, Chełchowski, Chełkowski, Chomętowski, Chudziński, Chyłkowski, Daleszyński, Dobiejewski, Dobiejowski, Dobkiewicz, Droszewski, Druw, Dzberowski, Dziakiewicz, Dziakowicz, Dziekczyński, Dzieleczyński, Dzieleszyński, Dzieszulski, Figler, Foglar, Fogler, Gaffron, Gałęski, Głuchowski, Gniazdowski, Golanka, Grabowiec, Grabowski, Grabski, Gurowski, Hołub, Iwan, Jabłkowski, Kaczanowski, Karchowski, Karmański, Karmieński, Karmiński, Karszanowski, Kemblan, Kęblan, Kościński, Kotowiecki, Lechon, Lechoń, Libek, Ludsławski, Ludzisławski, Luteński, Mieleński, Mieliński, Mieloński, Mileński, Miliński, Myślecki, Myślęcki, Naleski, Nalewski, Pelcz, Płuchowski, Pogorzelski, Pretficz, Pretwicz, Pretwitz, Prytwicz, Rumiejewski, Rumiejowski, Rumieniewski, Rumiewski, Rzegocki, Siekowski, Skoraczewski, Szołowski, Szucki, Trzecki, Tumigrała, Włościejewski, Włościejowski, Wszołowski, Zagłoba, Zagroba, Zberkowski

Wczele is a Polish coat of arms. It was used by several szlachta families in the times of the Polish–Lithuanian Commonwealth.

== History ==
This coat of arms was passed down from the Silesian Bernard Pretficz (Bernard Pretwicz, Pretwic). He was born in 1500 and was one of the few Silesians to have an elevated position under the Polish King. He became a Polish National Hero due to his success in driving the Tatars (Crimean Muslims) out of Poland, and what is now Ukraine. This is the Prittwitz coat of arms. The story is that his ancestor was taken by a North African King. The King told him that if he was able to beat his daughter in chess he would be set free, if he lost he would be killed. The Prittwitz won and was told that he could take the life of the King's daughter. Instead he cut off her arms so that she could no longer play chess (in other variants of this story, he simply hit her in the head with the chess board so hard that it broke, „Wczele” is similar to Polish „w czoło”, meaning „in the forehead”)

== Notable bearers ==
Notable bearers of this coat of arms include:

- Władysław Roch Gurowski
- fictional character Onufry Zagłoba

== See also ==
- Polish heraldry
- Heraldry
- Coat of arms
