= Katyń Museum =

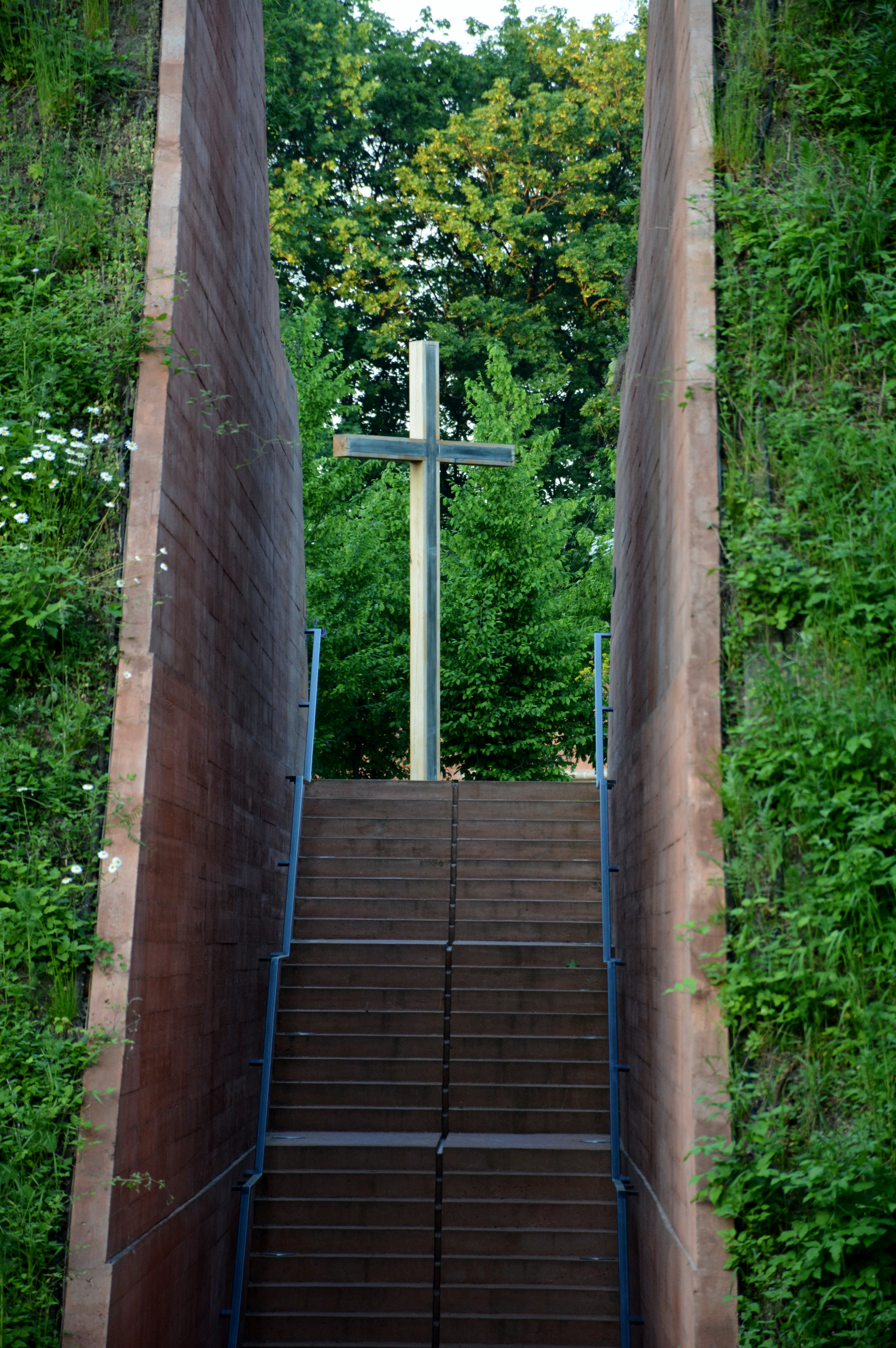
- Established: 1993
- Location: Jana Jeziorańskiego 4 Warsaw, Poland
- Type: military museum
- Website: www.muzeumkatynskie.pl

Muzeum Katyńskie w Warszawie is a museum in Warsaw, Poland. The museum was established in 1993. It is located in the Polish Army Museum. Objects, documents and personal effects from the site of the Katyn massacre can be seen in the museum. In 2017 museum was nominated for European Union Prize for Contemporary Architecture award.

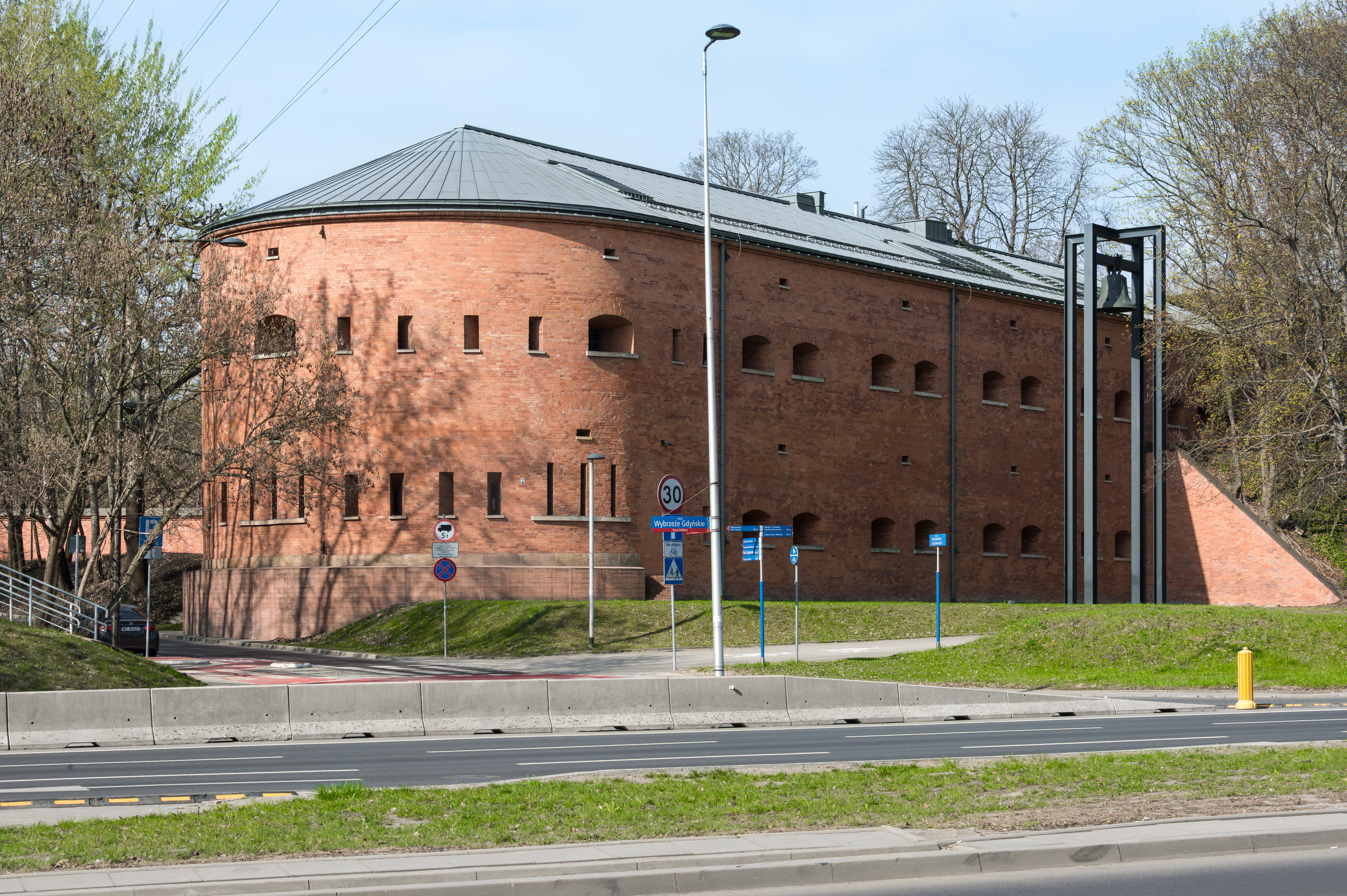

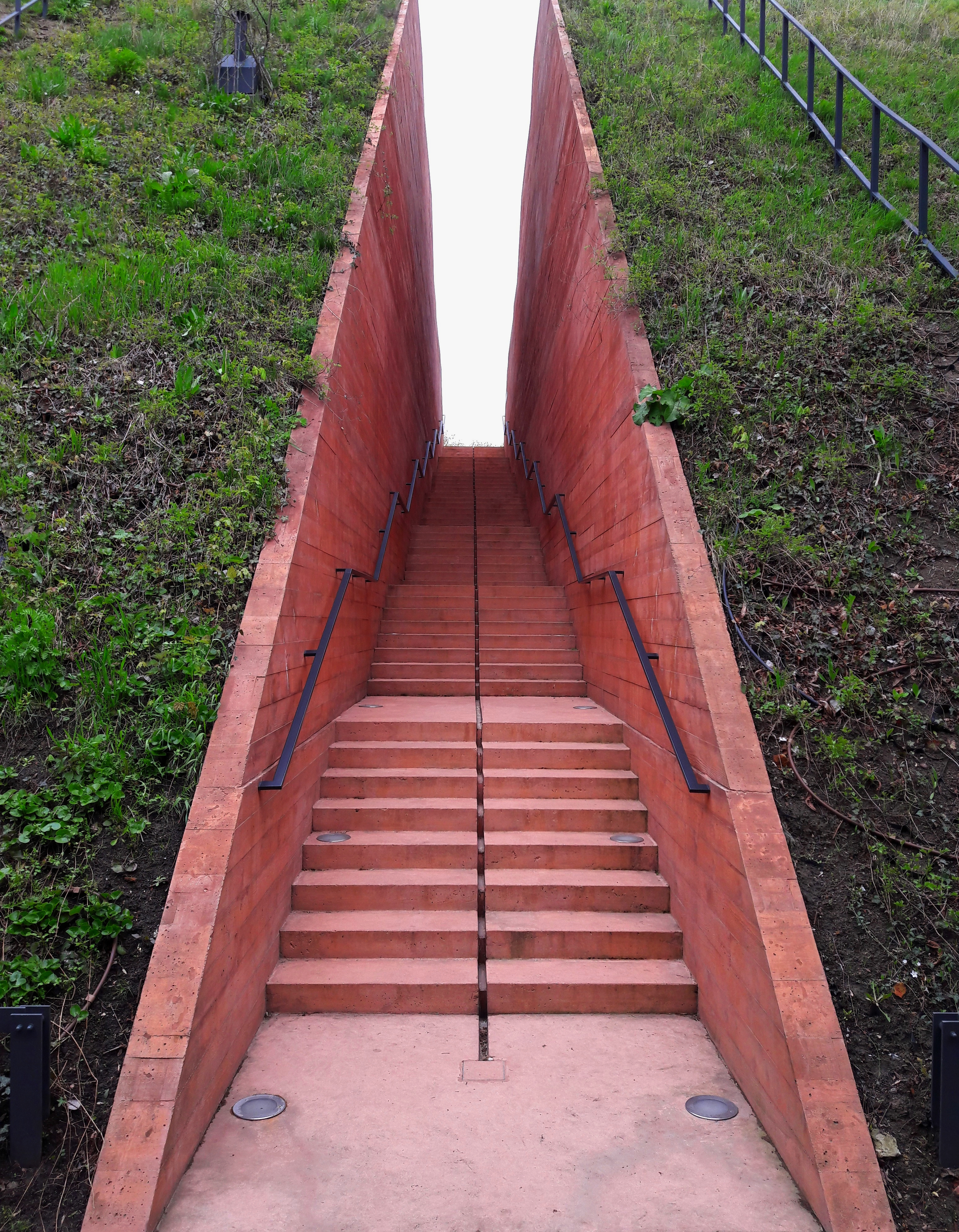

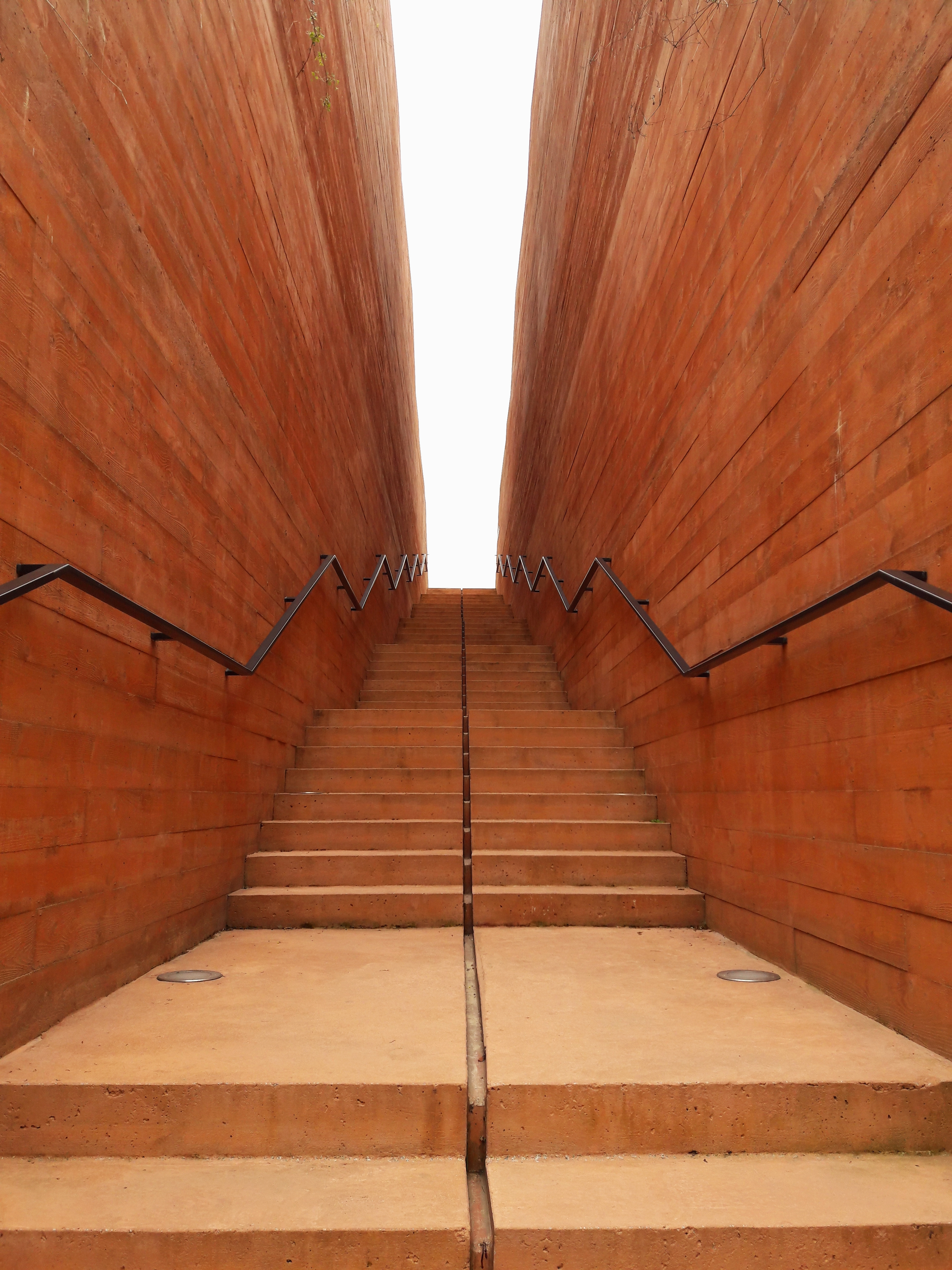

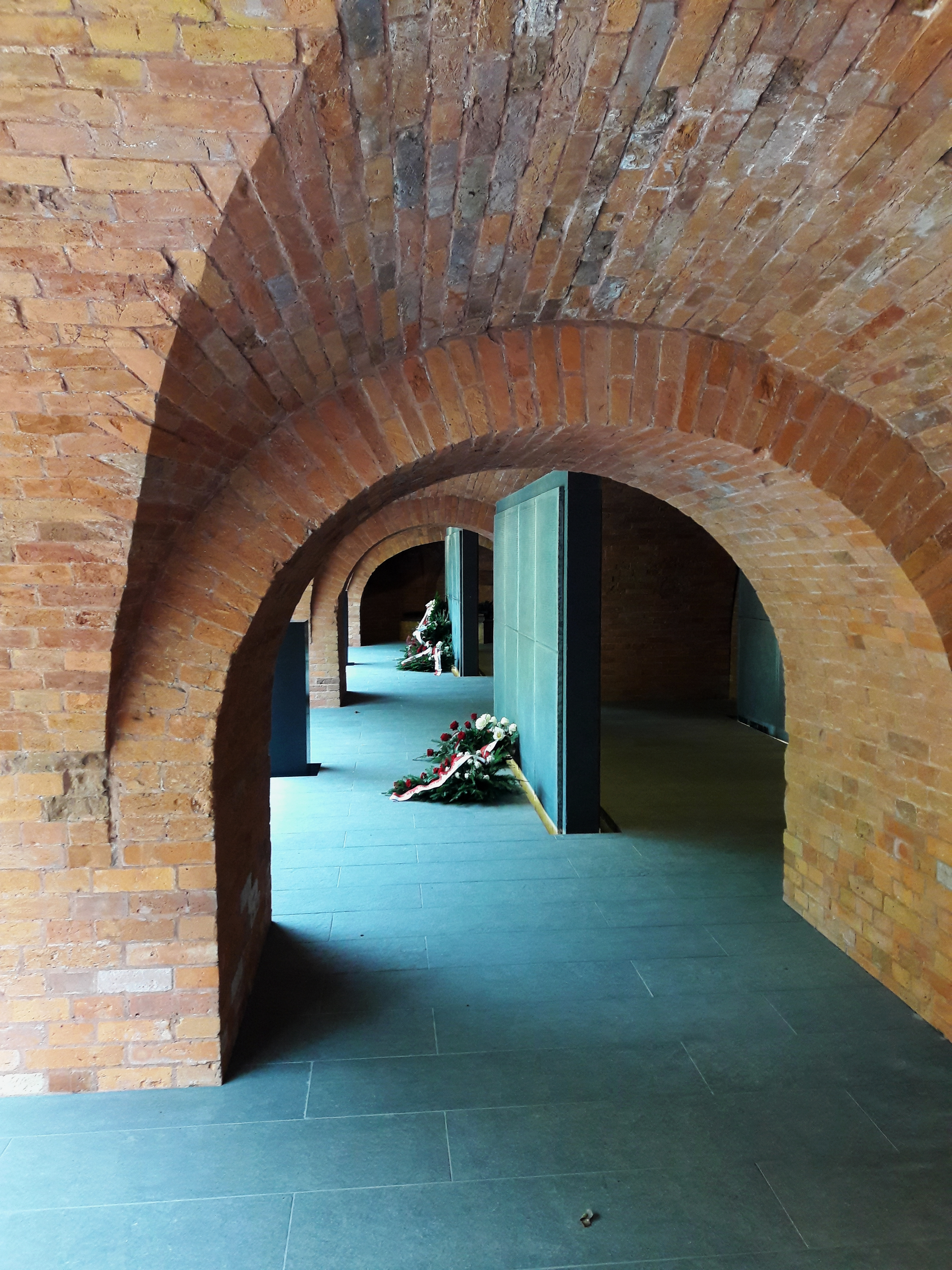

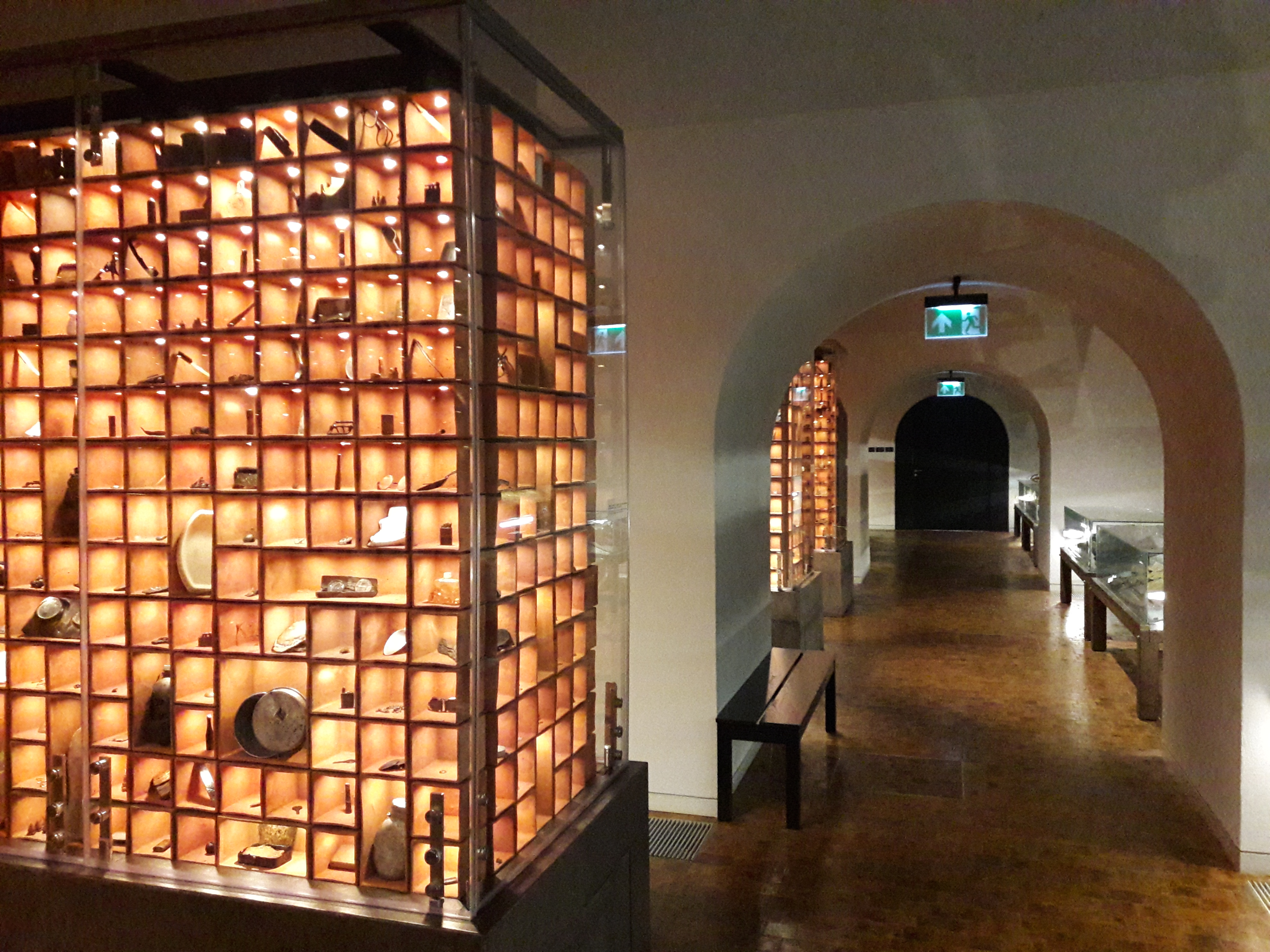
