= Piechota wybraniecka =

Type of infantry formation in the Polish–Lithuanian Commonwealth

Piechota wybraniecka (Polish pronunciation: [pjɛˈxɔta vɨbraˈɲɛt͡ska], chosen infantry) also known as piechota łanowa (łans infantry) was a type of an infantry formation in the Polish–Lithuanian Commonwealth. Formed in 1578. Consisted of "royal" peasants (one from every 20 łans) from not charged (not under frequent lien, etc.) and revendicated royal lands.

Difficulties in recruitment:

- mostly due to lack of constant dynasty in Poland (see: Royal elections in Poland), royal lands were under notorious, often illegal, control of Polish magnates (powerful and sometimes even semi-independent from the state), who opposed (see: liberum veto) losing their workers, legal revendication actions of King and Execution movement didn't give satisfactory results,
- even in free of charge and revendicated royal lands noble overseers preferred to cut costs by limiting the amount of training and equipment available, which reduced the military value of the unit,
- attempts to expand this duty to non-royal lands met with vast opposition (liberum veto) from feudally-bounded lesser and middle szlachta (the majority) so the formation was never expanded beyond the revendicated royal lands.
- armed "royal" peasants were inconvenient for stability of obsolete feudal political system of the country (see: Chmielnicki uprising supported by peasantry),
- nobility in Poland (szlachta) was much more numerous than in other countries reaching about 1,15 million people in 1618, a number high enough to fulfill any contemporary military requirement, without additional need to recruit "royal" peasants.

Eventually the formation was totally discontinued (late 17th / early 18th century) in exchange for a tax for the army.

== See also ==
- Piechota dymowa
- Piechota łanowa
- Wojsko komputowe
- Wojsko kwarciane
