= Bernard Pretwicz =

Hetman of Silesia (1500–1561)

- Bernhard von Prittwitz
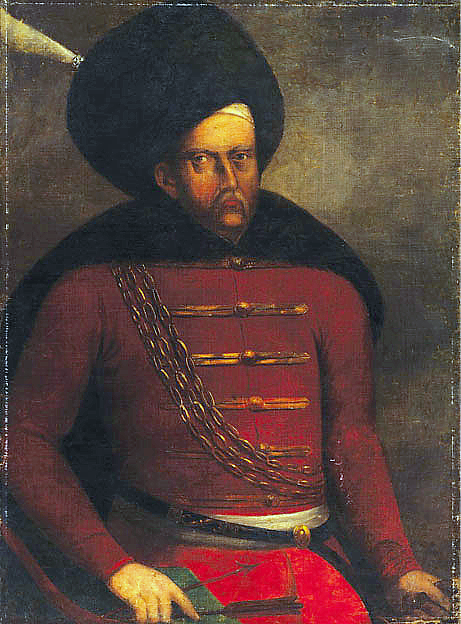
- Bernhard von Prittwitz, the "Terror Tartarorum", 1541
- Born: c. 1500; Silesia
- Died: 1561; Terebovlia
- Spouse: Barbara Zawadzka (m. 1551)
- Children: 3
- Relatives: Peter von Prittwitz
- Military career
- Allegiance: Crown of the Kingdom of Poland
- Rank: Starosta

Bernard Pretwicz (Note: German: Bernhard von Prittwitz; Polish: Bernard Pretwicz; Ukrainian: Бернард Претвич) (c. 1500 – 1561) was a Silesian noble of the Prittwitz family. After entering the service of the Polish King at a young age and leading a successful military career, he became a rittmaster of the obrona potoczna, and later the starosta of Bar and Ulaniv (1520–1552) and Terebovlia (1552–1561). He was widely known in Poland and Ukraine for fiercely protecting the borders of the Kingdom of Poland from Crimean Tatar raids, which earned him the nicknames of Terror of the Tatars (Latin: Terror Tartarorum) and Wall of Poland.

== Family ==
Pretwicz was the son of the landowner Peter von Prittwitz, lord of Gaffron, Rippin, Mangschütz and Kraschen (region Groß Wartenberg), Stronn (region Oels), as well as Haideberg and Myslniów (region Schildberg), and Ludmiła Stwolinska (Danewitz).

Details about his first wife are unknown. From this marriage he had a son Albert. In his second marriage in 1551 he was married to Barbara Zawadzka, also known as Branczlikowna, with whom he had son Jakob and a daughter. 'Jakob' 'later became Voivode. This 'Pretwicz' family living in Poland died out very soon.

== Life ==
=== Polish Captain (until 1540) ===
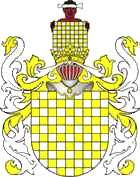
The coat of arms of the family of Pretwicz and Gaffron, Polish family coat of arms Wczele or Szachownica (chessboard)

Pretwicz probably came from Silesia to Poland at a young age and entered the service of the Polish King Sigismund I, who before his accession Duke of Glogau and Opole, as well as royally- Bohemian governor of his elder brother, the King Vladislav of Bohemia and Hungary had been in Silesia. Both may have known each other from that time. Perhaps also because his father Peter had already been in Polish military service, since he owned two goods in Poland. In any case, son Bernard is already mentioned in 1526 as a man at the Polish royal court. Later he also served as his successor Sigismund II of Poland.

In 1537, Pretwicz is called a royal Captain and commander a flock of 120 horsemen. But probably since 1530 he provided his service in the border area to the "Tatar Empire". At that time, all the enemies of Christianity s and all non-Christian peoples of the Orient were called Tartars, predominantly the Turks. The city of Bar as well as the neighboring towns of Trembowla and Ulanów had been invaded by Tartars in earlier times.

By 1538 Pretwicz must have already achieved first great merit in the fight against the Tartars and thus also the favor of Queen Bona Sforza, an Italian, because the Queen finally obtained the king, that contrary to the prevailing opinion of the "foreigner" Pretwicz. In 1538, the large estates around Koniacyn, in present-day Vinnytsia Oblast, were donated. But after all, Pretwicz's successes meant that he had to report in 1538/1539 even before the Polish Reichstag report. Also in 1539 Queen Bona provided for further benefits: It was left to Pretwicz city and Scharawka Castle (55 km northwest of Bar) with all its goods for lifelong use, from 1550 as property.

=== Starost of Ulanów, Bar and Trembowla (from 1540) ===
Bernard Pretwicz's struggle against Crimean Khanate
- Part of the Crimean–Nogai slave raids in Eastern Europe, Polish-Ottoman Wars and Cossack raids
Date	c.1540–1552
Location	Eastern Europe, predominantly the Polish and Ottoman borderlands
Result	Polish victory

Belligerents
Kingdom of Poland; Zaporozhian Cossacks	Crimean Khanate; Ottoman Empire; Wallachia

Finally, in 1540, Queen Bona entrusted him with the office of Starost of Bar, whose district belonged to her own. As a starost in the confines of Poland, Bernard Pretwicz's main mission was to protect Podolia from Tatar expeditions that devastated the region every year. With the income of the starosty, he managed to maintain a regular troupe to defend the province against the Tatar attacks. The resources of the starosty being insufficient, it engaged many Cossacks who often paid themselves by plundering the lands of the sultan, sometimes supplying them weapons and clothes. The pay of a Cossack was in any case half as high as that of a horse archer. The other starosts of the confines Fyodor Sanguszko, starost of Bratslav and Vinnytsia on the Southern Bug, and Dmytro Vyshnevetsky, staroste of Kaniv and Cherkasy on the Dnieper did the same.

At that time, only Polish noblemen were appointed to a "Starost" (Polish district administrator), which became - with the royal goods lying in this district - mostly hereditary - feud. Both in peace and in wartime, the Starost was the district captain, so in addition to his post as head of administration at the same time military Commander in Chief. So the appointment of a "foreigner" like Pretwicz to the Starost was an extraordinary honor.

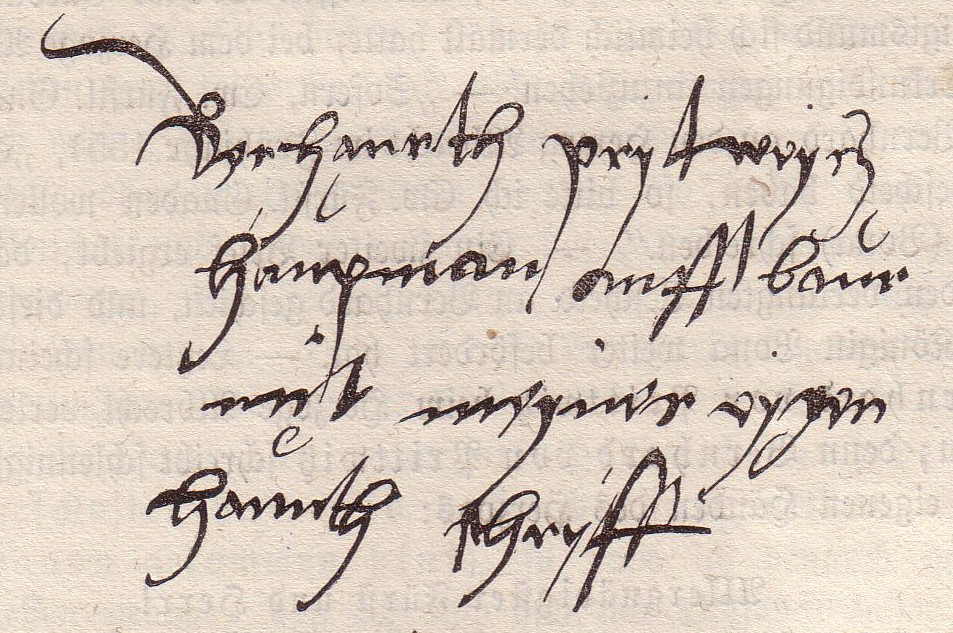
Signature of Bernard von Pretwicz as Captain on Bar in 1550: "Berhanrth prytwycz, Haupman auff baur with meyner eygen Hannth schryff"

Pretwicz became "the man of providence for the Podolian lands" (source: Pulaski ): The small fortress bar offered shelter and food for only 30 men. Therefore, Pretwicz gradually built up a new type of defense system. From Cheremissen and Cossacks he formed his own troop of about 300 men, which he housed in smaller, well-mounted groups in castle-like fortifications in villages in the area. In the border areas he also positioned spies. For the first time Pretwicz made it impossible for the Tartars to unexpectedly invade Polish settlements in the Bar district. Because of the new "warning system" it was now possible to concentrate the "flying border protection" within a very short time at the endangered spot. Also new was that the enemy was even attacked and persecuted until it was wiped out, trapped or killed. Pretwicz is said to have won more than 70 battles with the Tatars over the years. His defense system and his fighting technique were therefore taken over by all Cossacks. Thus, the Silesian Pretwicz became one of the first great Cossack leaders. Pretwicz became "the man of providence for the Podolian lands" (source: Pulaski ): The small fortress bar offered shelter and food for only 30 men. Therefore, Pretwicz gradually built up a new type of defense system. From Cheremissen and Cossacks he formed his own troop of about 300 men, which he housed in smaller, well-mounted groups in castle-like fortifications in villages in the area. In the border areas he also positioned spies. For the first time Pretwicz made it impossible for the Tartars to unexpectedly invade Polish settlements in the Bar district. Because of the new "warning system" it was now possible to concentrate the "flying border protection" within a very short time at the endangered spot. Also new was that the enemy was even attacked and persecuted until it was wiped out, trapped or killed. Pretwicz is said to have won more than 70 battles with the Tatars over the years. His defense system and his fighting technique were therefore taken over by all Cossacks. Thus, the Silesian Pretwicz became one of the first great Cossack leaders.

==== Campaigns of 1540 and 1541 ====
In March 1540, the Tatars had advanced to the city of Vinnytsia in northern Podolia. Pretwicz confronted them with a small group of Cossacks, and a battle took place as a result of which, the Tatar attack was repelled. Pretwicz then started pursuing the retreating raiders all the way to Ochakiv in the Jedisan, at that time one of the most important permanent places of the Ottoman Empire on the Black Sea, there he took away their rich prey and returned with Tatar women and children as prisoners. In 1541, Pretwicz invaded the Tatar territories again and pushed forward to Akkerman in the Budjak.

==== Sack of Ochakov 1545 ====
In 1545, he led a major naval expedition. The forces of border starostas led by him approached Ochakiv, attacked and sacked it. Polish government had denied Pretwicz's involvement in the raid, stating that these were likely Lithuanian or Muscovite free Cossacks.

==== Campaigns of 1547 and 1548 ====
In 1547, he led a campaign to Ochakiv once again. This time he failed to intercept the prisoners that were previously captured by Tatars near Vinnytsia. Pretwicz's Cossacks massacred and took captive some of the local Tatar population and returned to Ukraine. Similar raid was repeated in 1548.

==== Siege of Bar 1550 ====
In 1550, the Tatars, this time together with the Wallachians, re-entered the Polish Podolia and besieged the fortress Bar, well equipped with weapons, with at least 56 large and 1,120 small barracks. Modern sources estimate the size of Wallachian army in about five thousand people. Moldavian-Tatar attempts to capture the fortress with an assault ended in a failure, which forced them to withdraw back to the Ottoman Empire, looting villages that laid in their path.

Later, when King Sigismund II August, out of political calculations, prohibited him from retaliating against the Tartars, Pretwicz instead provided better border and city fortifications within his area of responsibility. These safeguards were a prerequisite for the beginning of peaceful settlement. Thus, under the protection of the "glorious starost" Pretwicz, the entire region of Bar and Vinnytsia was populated, trade and agriculture began to flourish.

During his tenure, not a single village in the Bar district has been cremated by Tatars. The fact is that many villages, towns and castles in Podolia have been rebuilt during this period.

== Silesian homeland ==
In all years Pretwicz has never stopped his contact with his Silesian homeland and his own family in Silesia. For example, B is B. Correspondence known with Duke Albrecht I of Brandenburg-Ansbach (1551/1552), the Grand Master of the German Order or with the Brieger Duke George II (1554). Also, he had in his home the estate Stronn, which he shared in 1548 with his brother Balthasar.

Pretwicz had probably met Duke Albrecht of Prussia, whose mother Sophie was the sister of King Sigismund I, perhaps at the Polish court. Or as a young man he had already been in the Duke's service; After all, he was also known in Silesia as a reiter horseman leader. Pretwicz was very open to Protestantism - like the entire family, which became Protestant early on. Therefore, Pretwicz tried to promote 12,000 soldiers for Duke Albrecht in Poland in support of the Protestant struggle.

== "Terror Tartarorum" ==
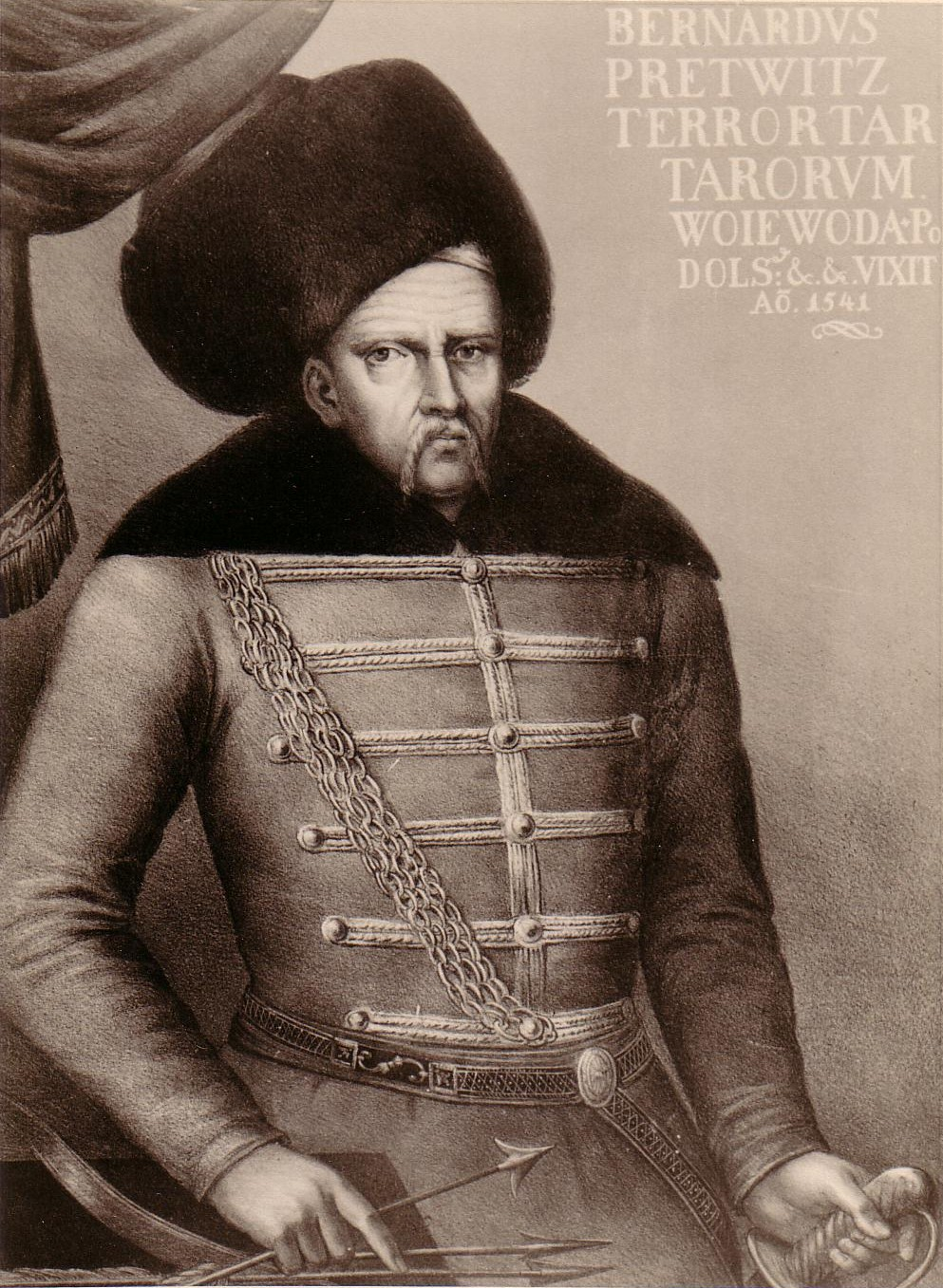
Bernard von Pretwicz, "Terror Tartarorum", 1541 (engraving from the 19th century after the original painting)

Pretwicz's victorious battles against the Tatars, who after decades of suffering at the border finally made the population of Poland breathe a sigh of relief in the Tatar defense, had to attract a great deal of attention. He therefore enjoyed the greatest fame, greatest reverence and esteem even during his lifetime - especially among the Polish youth. For example, a grandson of Biecki, who served as King Sigismund I as a squire, explicitly asked for permission to learn equestrian service at Pretwicz. A legend also later reported: "Just as Osowski and Pretwicz told us that children who cried too much in the cradle were frightened by their names so that they would be silent." (Source: Johann Sinapius ).

Pretwicz died in Trembowla in 1561. But even after his death, the enemies are said to have fled at the mere sight of Polish hosts - in the belief that the "Terror Tartarorum" still command them. Many years later, Ukrainian Cossacks are said to have sung the "Tartar Terror" in their war songs. A Polish chronicler reported back in 1726 that Pretwicz still stood in high esteem 170 years after his death. And King John II Casimir Vasa is said to have set up a portrait of Pretwicz in his room.

For his military achievements also speaks that only two years after Pretwicz 'death King Sigismund II in Poland a standing army erected to meet the renewed destruction in the border provinces by the Tartars, and long after his death the rhyme "Za Pana Pretfica wolna od Tatar granica" (At Pretwicz times the border was free of Tatars) was very popular in Poland.

Pretwicz's gravestone once bore the inscription cited here in Latin:

Wanderer, behold, how uncertain man's dwelling is;
I came from Silesia;
Podolia praises the deceased;
I taught the art of war to the army;
I have cut down Tartars, Turks and Wallachians;
therefore I was dear to the great king of the Sarmatians, Sigismund I.
I have received honorary testimonies and am celebrated in my mouth;
now I will be covered by this little mound,
abandoned by all;
I have neither treasures, nor piety, nor my fate helped;
not even my warfare took advantage of me;
So if you are religious, I ask you not to forget the Pretwicz if you pass by here.

== Commemoration ==
- Street Bernarda Pretficza named after him in Wrocław.
- Street Bernard Pretwicz named after him in Vinnytsia.

== See also ==
- Prittwitz – Pretwicz's family

== Bibliography ==
- Hans-Georg von Pretwicz: Bernard Pretwicz from the House of Gaffron (Terror Tartarorum). Selbstverlag, Flensburg 1961.
- Robert von Pretwicz and Gaffron: The v. Pretwicz'sche nobility sex. Publisher Wilh. Gottl. Korn, Wroclaw 1870, page 57f.
- Genealogical Handbook of the Nobility, Noble Houses A Volume VI, Volume 29 of the Complete Series, C. A. Strong Publisher, Limburg (Lahn) 1962, p. 310
- * Sękowski, Roman (2020). Herbarz szlachty śląskiej. Informator genealogiczn-heraldyczny. Vol. 7. Opole.
