= Obrona potoczna =

Hired military force in Medieval Poland

Obrona potoczna, variously translated into English as "Permanent Defense", "General Defense", or "Current Defense" was a hired military force in the 15th- and 16th-century Kingdom of Poland and the Polish–Lithuanian union that existed until 1563. It was charged with defending the country's southern borders against incursions by the Tatars as well as occasional raids by Moldovans, Turks and Wallachians.

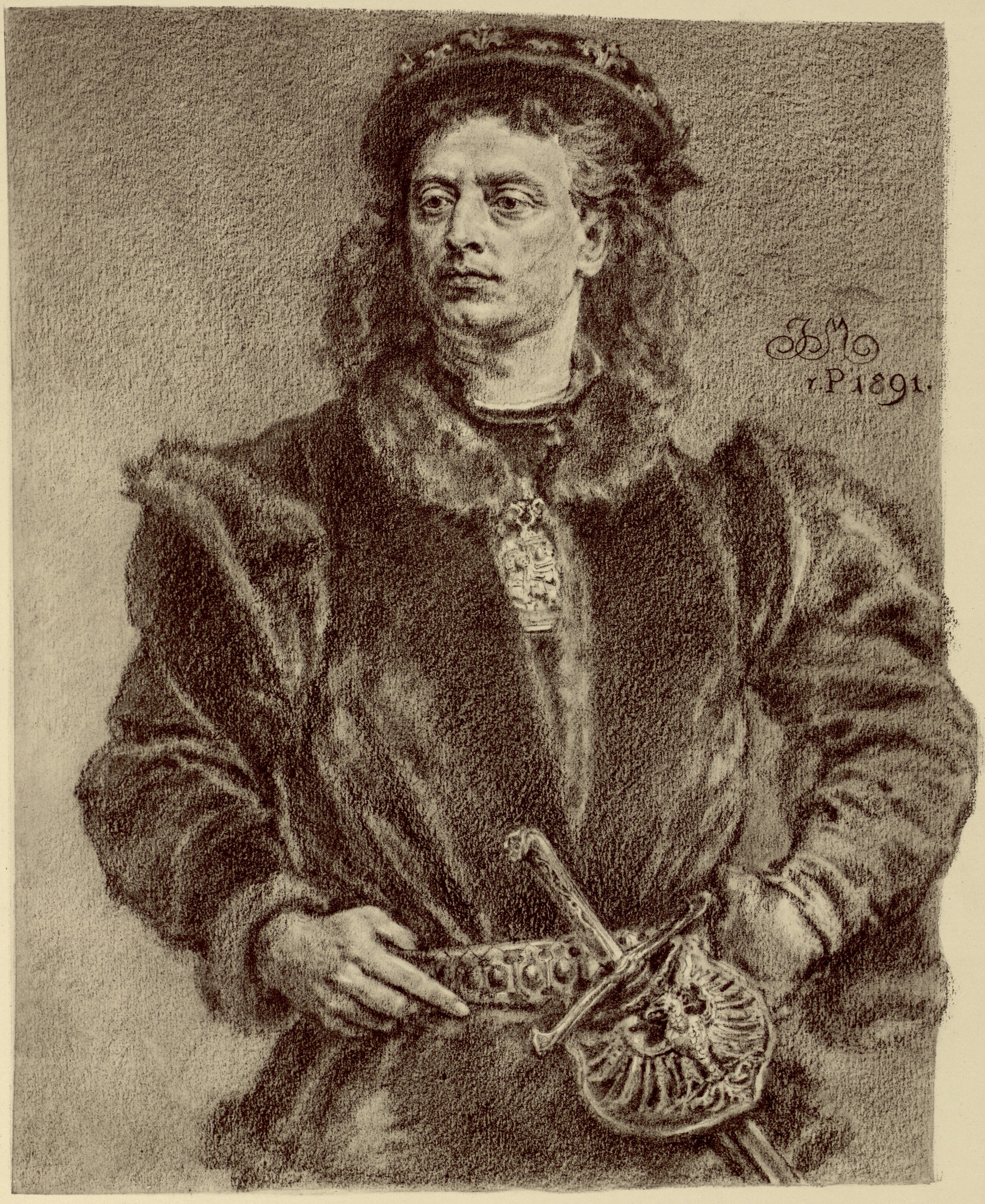
Prince (later King of Poland) John I Albert who oversaw the organization and funding of the formation.

The force originated in 1479 although similar formations had been discussed at various sessions of the Polish sejm previously. Its organization and funding was undertaken by prince John I Albert, later king of Poland, who at the time was charged with overseeing the defense of the south. While by the end of the 15th century it was a permanent formation, it was not a standing army as its members usually served seasonal shifts. The need for units of this type was recognized by the mid-15th century, as Tatar raids on the country's southern territories - mostly Red Ruthenia and Podolia - increased in frequency and the traditional pospolite ruszenie ("levee en masse") proved inadequate at protecting the borders. The first commander of the force was Jan Karnkowski, later appointed hetman. Due to this position his title was "hetman of the hired soldiers". Initially numbering 1,200 infantry and 900 cavalry, the size fluctuated depending on funding and need, and by the beginning of the 1500s it numbered around 2,000. The money for the soldiers came mostly from royal coffers while the nobility made only minor and occasional financial contributions.

The soldiers recruited mostly from Podolian and Ruthenian szlachta (nobility), and while in service were stationed at Kamieniec Podolski (Kamianets-Podilskyi, now Ukraine), Trembowla (Terebovl) and the fortress of Bar. Service in the formation provided the recruits with valuable military experience in a tough environment which made the Obrona potoczna one of the best units of the overall Polish armed forces of the time. In addition to protecting the frontier, Obrona potoczna also took part in regular military engagements, for example in the Polish victory against the Moldovans, at the Battle of Obertyn. After the military reforms of king Stephen Báthory in 1563, Obronna potoczna was replaced by the Wojsko kwarciane ("Quarter Army"), an actual standing army. Many of the best soldiers in Báthory's army during the Livonian War were former regimental leaders of the Obrona potoczna.
