= Cathal J. Nolan =

American historian and professor

- Born: August 2, 1956 (age 70); Dublin, Ireland
- Education: University of Toronto
- Occupation: Historian
- Scientific career
- Fields: History
- Workplaces: Boston University

Cathal J. Nolan is an American historian, author and university professor.

== Life ==
He was born on August 2, 1956, in Dublin, Ireland.

He was born in Ireland but grew up in Canada. He moved to the United States in 1995.

He married Valerie Ellen Duff on September 7, 1985.

== Education ==
He completed his M.A. and Ph.D. degrees at the University of Toronto.

== Career ==
He is a professor of history and director of the International History Institute at the Frederick S. Pardee School of Global Studies, Boston University.

== Awards and honours ==
He has received the Gilder Lehrman Prize for Military History.

== Bibliography ==
He is the author of a number of notable books:

- The Allure of Battle: A History of How Wars Have Been Won and Lost
- Ethics and Statecraft: The Moral Dimension of International Affairs
- Power and Responsibility in World Affairs: Reformation versus Transformation
- Notable U.S. Ambassadors Since 1775: A Biographical Dictionary
