= Andrew A. Michta =

American political scientist

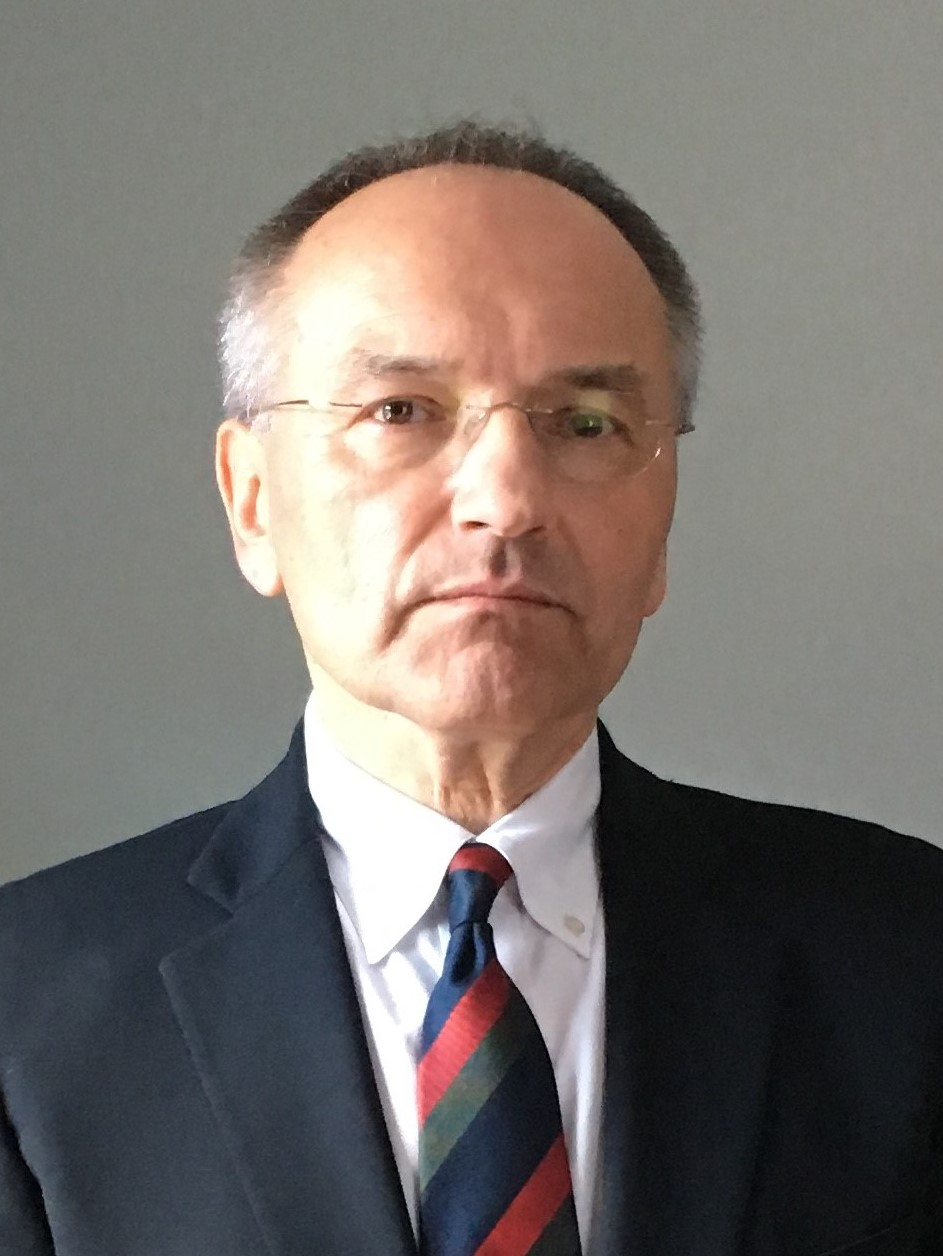
- Born: Poland
- Education: Johns Hopkins University SAIS (PhD)
- Occupation: Political scientist
- Employer: Atlantic Council

Andrew Alexander Michta (born April 4, 1956) is an American political scientist. He is Professor of Strategic Studies at the Hamilton School at the University of Florida. Previously he was a Senior Fellow at the Atlantic Council's GeoStrategy Initiative. From 2016-2023 he was Dean of the College of International and Security Studies at the George C. Marshall European Center for Security Studies in Germany. Previously he was Professor of National Security Affairs at the US Naval War College. He was also an affiliate of the Minda de Gunzburg Center for European Studies, an Adjunct Fellow at the Center for Strategic and International Studies – Europe Program, and an adjunct political scientist at the RAND Corporation. He is a life member of the Council on Foreign Relations.

== Early life and education ==
Michta was born in Poland, the son of Józef and Adela (Stokowiec) Michta. He holds a Ph.D. in International Relations from the Johns Hopkins University School of Advanced International Studies (1987).

== Career ==
From 1988–2015 he was the M.W. Buckman Distinguished Professor of International Studies at Rhodes College, a predominantly undergraduate college in Memphis, Tennessee. There he received the Clarence Day Dean's Award for Outstanding Research. He was on leave from 2005 to 09 and from 2011 to 13. In 2015 he left Rhodes and went to teach in the JPME system at the US Naval War College graduate program.

While on leave from Rhodes, from May 2011–13 he was the Senior Transatlantic Fellow and the founding Director of the Warsaw branch office of the German Marshall Fund of the United States. From 2005–09, he was Professor of National Security Studies and Director of Studies of the Senior Executive Seminar at the George C. Marshall European Center for Security Studies in Germany. He was a visiting scholar at the Hoover Institution on War, Revolution and Peace and a research associate at the Institute for European, Russian and Eurasian Studies at George Washington University. From 2000–2001 he was at the Woodrow Wilson Center in Washington, D.C. (2000–2001).

He is a life member of the Council on Foreign Relations. He is also a member of the International Institute for Strategic Studies in London. He is a Contributing Editor to 19FortyFive, a national security focused website. He served on the Advisory Council of the Center for European Policy Analysis in Washington, D.C. and has served on the AAASS Board of Directors (2001–2004). He was senior fellow at the Center for European Policy Analysis from 2013–14. The BBC characterized him as "a well-known expert on security issues." He speaks several languages, including English, French, German, Polish, and Russian.

== Views ==
Michta has argued that the United States and NATO missed opportunities after the September 11, 2001 attack to revitalize the NATO alliance. Specifically, he argues that NATO should have taken the lead in Afghanistan.

Michta has explored the implications of NATO's institutional effort to use its enlargement process as a means to advance civil-military reform in Eastern Europe. Michta argues that NATO's requirement that all new members must meet specific goals of democratic civilian control over its military was especially successful in reforming Poland, Hungary and the Czech Republic. He concludes that these three new NATO members have made dramatic efforts to depoliticize their military, in contrast to the political control during the communist era. Thereby the democratic forces in these countries have been strengthened.

Michta has written a number of editorials from a standpoint sympathetic to or aligned with right wing populism. This includes work critical of cancel culture as well as work attributing left-wing civil unrest in the United States to ideas passed down by political elites "unmoored from the fundamentals of this nation’s founding and its traditional commitment to building a decent society." Michta has also been critical of what he perceives as an open immigration policy in the EU, arguing that the rise of neo-nationalism in Europe since 2015 exists as a popular "anti-establishment rebellion" against politicians' refusal to significantly restrict the intake of migrants and refugees.

== Works ==
- The Limits of Alliance: The United States, NATO and the EU in North and Central Europe. Rowman & Littlefield (2006).
- The Soldier-Citizen
- Polish Foreign Policy Reconsidered
- East Central Europe after the Warsaw Pact
- The Government and Politics of Postcommunist Europe
- America's New Allies: Poland, Hungary and the Czech Republic in NATO
