= Sułkowski =

Sułkowski (feminine: Sułkowska) is a Polish-language surname associated with the Polish noble Sułkowski family. Russified version: Sulkovsky.

Notable people with this surname include:

- Alexander Joseph Sulkowski (1695–1762), a Saxon-Polish general
- Antoni Sułkowski (1735–1796), Polish Chancellor of the Crown
- Antoni Paweł Sułkowski (1785–1836), Polish division general
- David Sulkovsky (born 1978), German professional ice hockey player
- Joseph Sulkowski, (c.1770–1798), Polish captain, aide de camp to Bonaparte
- Łukasz Sułkowski (born 1972), Polish professor of economic sciences
