= Antoni Sułkowski =

Antoni Sułkowski is the name of:

- Antoni Sułkowski (chancellor) (1735–1796), Polish Chancellor of the Crown
- Antoni Paweł Sułkowski (1785–1836), Polish general
