= Sułkowski family =

Sułkowski
- Sulima coat of arms.
- Current region: Austria, Germany, Poland, Australia, United States, Canada
- Origin: Sułków, Poland

The House of Sułkowski (Polish plural: Sułkowscy) is a Polish princely family and gentry who owned palaces in Rydzyna and Bielsko. The family later became incorporated into the German and Austrian nobility.

== Coat of arms and motto ==
Family motto: All for the Fatherland.

Coat of arms of Counts Sułkowski (1732)

Coat of arms of Princes Sułkowski (1752), with Bohemian (silver lion), Saxon (green common rue on the black eagle) and Habsburg (red lion and a two-headed eagle) elements.(variant I)

Coat of arms of Princes Sułkowski (1752), with Bohemian (silver lion), Saxon (green common rue on the black eagle) and Habsburg (red lion and a two-headed eagle) elements. (variant II)

== History ==
The origins of the Sułkowski family are relatively obscure. The Sułkowski family originally lived in a village known as Sułków, now known as Sułkowo Borowe, in the Mława district 100 kilometers (62 mi) north of Warsaw. Of the family manor house, only a single gatepost remains. Close by there is a wooden church built in 1644. The earliest records are from the 16th century. For the first four generations only the oldest son has been recorded.

- Pawel of Sułków married Franciszka Maciejowska.
- Jan of Sułków married Katarzyna Dluska.
- Sebastian of Sułków married Barbara Razyminska.
- Stanislaw Sułkowski (b. mid 17th century) married Ełzbieta Szalewska (either in 1694 or 1695).

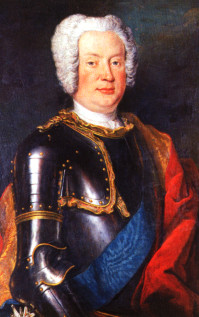
Portrait of Aleksander Józef Sułkowski

According to some sources, Elżbieta Szalewska had a liaison with Augustus II the Strong and bore him an illegitimate son. Her husband, Stanisław Sułkowski, gave this child, Aleksander Józef Sułkowski, his last name. On March 18, 1754, he gained from Queen Maria Theresa of Austria the title of Reichsfürst, along with the right of primogeniture. Additionally, in the same year, the princely title was granted to every descending member of the Sułkowski family.

In 1752, the State Country (Status Maiores) of Bielsko was purchased by Aleksander Józef. In that same year, the State Country was changed to the status of a principality (Fürstentum). On November 2, 1754, Bohemian Queen Maria Theresa of Austria created the Duchy of Bielsko (Herzogtum Bielitz). The next owners of the nominal Duchy had the right to the title of Herzog (Duke), while other members of the family were titled Fürst (Prince).

Aleksander Józef was the progenitor of the Bielsko line and the first of the Bielsko ordynats. Antoni, who established the Sułkowski Ordynat, was the progenitor of the "Wielkopolska", or Rydzyna, line of the Sułkowski family. The Rydzyna line became extinct in 1909 along with the death of the sixth and last Ordynat of Rydzyna, Antoni Stanisław. His two sons having produced no heirs, according to the rules of the ordynat, his fortune of over 10,000 hectares of land went into the possession of the Prussian government.

August Kazimierz's second youngest brother, Franciszek, did not join the Sułkowski Ordynat and obtained for himself an inheritance, to which entered the Bielsko castle and its fortune. The Bielsko ordynat was inherited by his son Aleksander, and after him, Jan. After Jan, the ordynat passed into the hands of his son Ludwik Jan Nepomucen, and next it was inherited by his son Jozef Maria Ludwik. Aleksander Ludwik was the last Ordynat of Bielsko. The descendants of this line have continued to the present day in Australia, Canada, Austria and Germany.

== Sułkowski Ordynat ==
On May 6, 1776, Aleksander Józef's oldest son, August Kazimierz, created the Rydzyna Ordynat (also known as the Sułkowski Ordynat), thus causing the younger Rydzyna line to separate from the older Bielsko line created by his father. His inheritances were placed into this ordynat. The Ordynat fortune was willed to the Komisja Edukacjna Narodowa in the moment of the death of the last male heir of the family. The Ordynat was to then take the name of Fundacja Książat Sułkowskich.

On January 16, 1783, the Sułkowski Ordynat gained the inheritances of his younger brother Aleksander Antoni, and half of his third youngest brother's, Antoni, fortunes. The Sułkowski Ordynat contained most of the town of Rydzyna along with its castle, several parcels of Leszno, Kobylin, and over 25 villages and small towns in that part of Wielkopolska, as well as several parcels in Warsaw and other parts of Poland.

Shortly after the last announcement of the Ordynat, two of the oldest brothers, August Kazimierz and Aleksander Antoni, died in 1786, both heirless. The Ordynat was thus taken up by Antoni. The debts incurred by the two brothers and by the Ordynat itself caused him great problems. He appealed to the Sejm and in 1791 was allowed to sell the possessions in Kobylin, Zduny, and Wijewo for over 3 million zloty. The occupation of the country by the Prussian and Russian armies in 1792 and, ultimately, the partitions of Poland increased the financial problems. In January 1796, Antoni died, leaving all complications to his widow and only child, his 11-year-old son, Antoni Paweł.

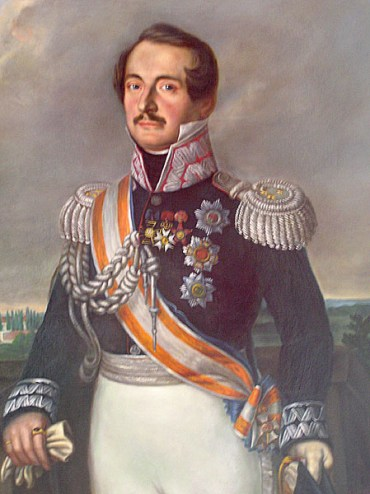
Prince Antoni Paweł Sułkowski

Baron Lestwitz, from the close-by fortune of Czyrniny, helped Antoni's widow in the administration of the large debts passed to her from her husband. In September 1798, the courts passed the verdict of liquidation of personal property, not including real property. In November and December of that year, in Leszno, furniture, libraries, and items from the Rydzyna Castle were sold. The Prussian government stated that the properties within the Ordynat did not fall under the creditors' pretensions.

During this time, the Napoleonic Wars had come. At the age of 22, Antoni Paweł entered the Napoleonic army and took part in battles in Spain and the invasion of Russia. After the death of Józef Poniatowski, for a short of amount of time, he took command over the Polish Corps. He returned to Rydzyna in 1815 and took on the responsibility of the Ordynat. Due to lack of funds, the orangery and other buildings were liquidated. Afterward, the financial status improved somewhat and Antoni Paweł changed the layout of the Rydzyna Castle park from the French to the English Style.

In April 1836, Antoni Paweł died. The care of his 16-year-old son August Antoni went to Luwigsdorf-Frankenberg, Chief Justice of Poznań. He adequately took care of Ordynat business. However, when August Antoni became an adult and married Maria Mycielska in 1843, the situation worsened again on account of the couple's extravagant style in their social life. In addition, there was the Prussian agricultural reform. In 14 village gminas belonged to the Ordynat, around 2500 hectares of land was divided amongst peasants.

After the death of August Antoni in November 1882, the Ordynat passed to his son, Antoni Stanisław, who was by then 38 years old. With his first wife, Countess Maria Emma Gislana de Sanchez d'Alcantara, he had two sons – Aleksander and Franciszek. Both sons died heirless while Antoni Stanisław was alive.

Therefore, after the death of the last ordynat, Antoni Stanisław on June 15, 1909, according to Article III, the property of the Sułkowski Ordynat was to be given to the use of the Komisja Edukacjna Narodowa under the name of Fundacja Kziazat Sułkowskich. Antoni Stanisław believed that this article was not valid, since the Komisja no longer existed. Before his death, in 1905, he signed in Berlin an inheritance agreement recognizing his cousins Henryk Potocki and Antoni Wodzicki as universal inheritors of his property. The Prussian government, however, believed that the Pruskie Kolegium Szkolne were the legal substitute of the Komisja, and the courts in Poznań agreed.

Following this, in September 1909, the Pruskie Kolegium Szkolne was written into the perpetual usufruct books at Rydzyna as the new owners of the Fundacja. The Fundacja had at that time a little over 7643 hectares.

== Family residences ==
Residential castles of the Sułkowski family

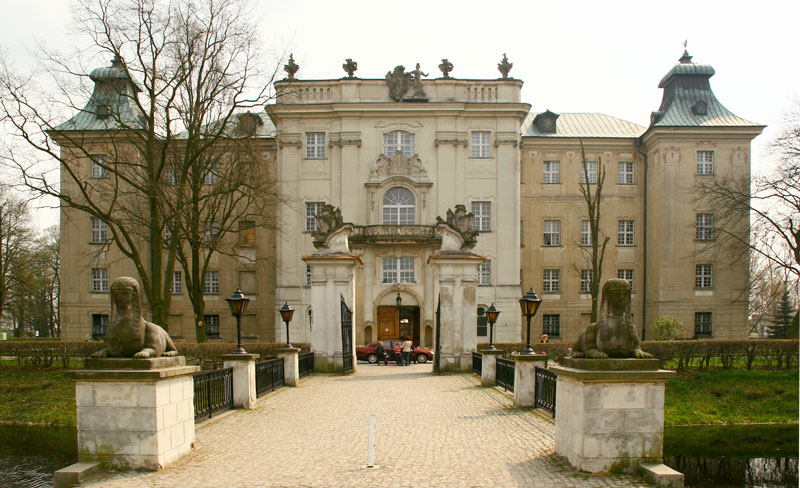
Rydzyna Castle

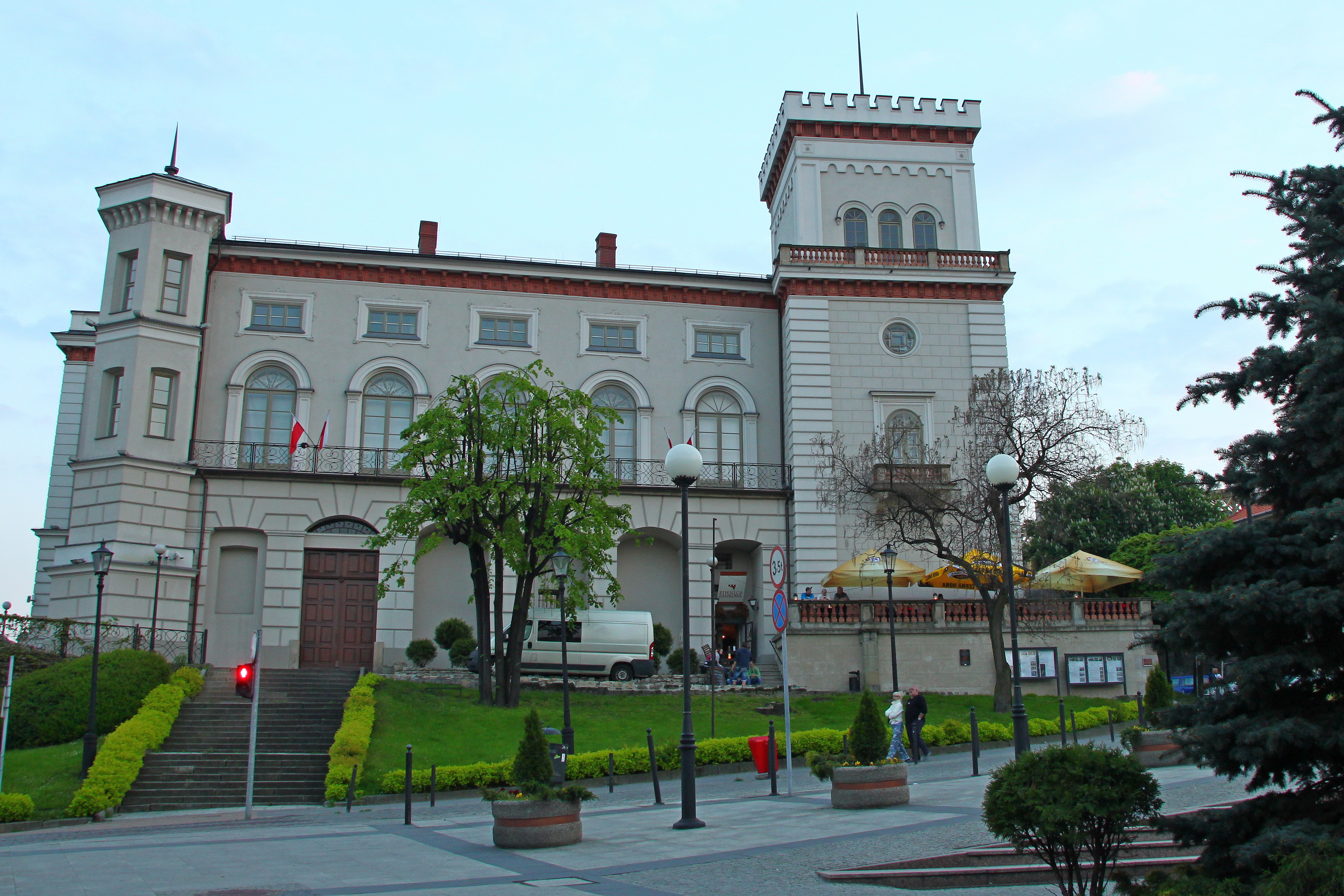
Sułkowski Castle in Bielsko-Biała
- Rydzyna Castle – Aleksander Józef purchased the Leszczyński estates of Rydzyna, Leszno, and neighboring areas in 1738. The castle was restored and expanded under his guide. Upon the death of Antoni Stanisław on June 15, 1909, the control of his possessions were taken by the Prussian government, which bequeathed it to the German Eastern Marches Society.
- Sułkowski Castle in Bielsko-Biała – Aleksander Józef bought this castle in 1752. The last Ordynat of Bielsko was Aleksander Ludwik, who moved to Austria in 1944 with everything from this residence. The castle was owned by the family until 1945.

== Descendants of Aleksander Józef Sułkowski ==
Aleksander Józef Sułkowski married Baroness Maria Franziska Stein zu Jettingen (1712–1741) in 1728. They had a total of eight children, with four sons and four daughters.

1. August Kazimierz (15 November 1729 in Dresden – 7 January 1786 in Leszno). Royal Chamberlain, general of the royal army, commander of the Rydzyna infantry regiment, Marshal of the Sejm (Polish parliament) 1775–1776. He completed his father's work of expanding the Rydzyna Castle and created the Sułkowski Foundation. He married Louise Mniszech in 1766 but had no children.
2. Alexander Antoni (15 October 1730 – 21 September 1786). General of the royal army 1785. He married Eleonore Cetner in 1755 but had no children.
3. Franciszek – Founder of the Bielsko line.
4. Antoni – Founder of the Rydzyna line.
5. Marianna (1728–1749)(m. 1747) Franciszek Jakub Szembek
6. Joanna (1736–1800)(m. 1750) Prince Peter Sapieha. No children.
7. Josepha (1737–1756)(m. 1753) Count Ignacy Potocki. Two children – Marianna and Alexander Potocki.
8. Petronela (1741-1759)

=== The Rydzyna princes ===
- Antoni Sułkowski (11 June 1734 – 16 April 1796 in Rydzyna); colonel of the royal army 1757, general 1762, commander of the Rydzyna infantry regiment 1786, chancellor of the kingdom 1793. He became the head of the Sułkowski Foundation upon the childless death of both his older brothers. He married Countess Marianna Dzialynska 1766, divorced her 1781. Then he married Countess Caroline of Bubna-Littitz 1784 and had one son.
  - Antoni Paweł Sułkowski (31 December 1785 in Leszno – 13 April 1836 in Rydzyna) b. 31.12.1785 – Leszno, d. 13.04.1836 – Rydzyna. He was colonel of infantry of the Duchy of Warsaw in 1807, brigade general 1810, division general 1813. He Married Ewa Kicka (1786–1824) 14.01.1898 in Warsaw. They had 5 children:
    - Taida Caroline (1811–1839)(m.) Count Henry Wodzicki and had one son.
    - Helen Caroline (1812–1900)(m. 1833) Count Henry Potocki and had 4 sons and 2 daughters.
    - Ewa Caroline (b. 1814)(m. 1838) Count Wladyslaw Potocki and had 2 daughters.
    - Teresa Caroline (1815–1889)(m. 1840) Count Henry Wodzicki in 1840 and had 3 sons and 2 daughters.
    - August Antoni (13 December 1820 – 19..) married Maria Mycielska (1822–19..) 23.01.1843. They had one son.
      - Antoni Stanisław Sułkowski (6 February 1844 in Rydzyna – 15 June 1909 in Munich). He married Countess Maria Emma Gislana de Sanchez d'Alcantara (1852–1877) in Brussels 03.09.1872. They had two sons. He married again – Josephine Schhmidt in Breslau (modern Wrocław) in 1898, but they had no children.
        - Alexander (1873 in Rydzyna – 1905 in San Remo). He married twice, but had no children.
        - Franciszek (1874–1903), never married.

Since Antoni Stanisław's two sons predeceased him with no children, upon his death in 1909, the Rydzyna line of Princes Sułkowski ended.

=== The dukes of Bielsko ===
- Franciszek Sułkowski (29 January 1733 – 22 April 1812); lieutenant-general of the Polish infantry, later general in the Russian army, Austrian chamberlain, inherited the Bielsko principality. He married Marianna Strzemeska in 1759, but she died in 1770 without children. He then married Judyta Maria Montbelli de Biciard (a Warsaw actress) in 1776. They had three children:
  - Alexander Joseph (1776 in Warsaw – 1804). He became a major in the Austrian army but did not marry.
  - Julia Francis (1776 in Warsaw – 1836).
  - Jan Nepomucen Sułkowski (23 June 1777 in Warsaw – 9 November 1832 in Teresin) married Baroness Louise Larisch of Moennich (1786 – 3 March 1848) in 1806 in the Slupna castle at Myslowice, Silesia. They had one surviving child.
    - Ludwik Jan Alfred Sułkowski (m.1st.) Maria Harry, died in childbirth, the child did not survive (m.2nd.1845) Baroness Maria Elisabeth Dietrich von Landsee (1823–1853). They had one son. (m.3rd.03.06.1853) Maria Antonina Gemperle (1832–1875) in Albany, New York. They had 9 children:
      - Joseph Maria (2 February 1848). He was married twice but only had one daughter, who in turn had no children.
      - Taida (14 December 1853 in New Bremen, USA -) (m.1877) Baron Lotar Unterrichter de Rechtental in Bielsko. They had no children.
      - Adolf Jan (17 November 1855 in New Bremen – 26 December 1913 in Kraków) (m.) Charlotte Glass in Bielsko and they had two daughters.
        - Romana (b. 1881 - September 1969) (m.) Baron Karol Czecz von Lindenwald 91881-1929)
        - Maria Aleksandra (26 November 1882 - 9 September 1970) (m.) Count Georg Jaxa von Gross-Konary-Konarski (1884-1936)
      - Anna (b. 1858 in New Bremen)
      - Stanisław (5 June 1862 in Rohrschach, Switzerland – 18 January 1940 in Tresternitz, Germany)
      - Gabriela (b. 2 May 1866 in Bielsko) (m.) Baron Adolf Theodor von Korff-Schmising-Kerssenbrock in Ebenfurth, Germany
      - Wanda (b. 8 January 1868 in Bielsko) (m.) Count Raimund Fugger von Kirchberg und zu Weissenhorn in Vienna
      - Edgar (8 January 1868 in Bielsko – 6 September 1954 in Gmunden, Austria)
      - Wiktor (17 January 1870 in Bielsko – 23 September 1946 in Hungary)
      - Alexander Edmund Sułkowski (8 December 1856 in New Bremen – 2 September 1929 in Bielsko) (m.1890) Baroness Maria Moser von Ebreichsdorf (1872–1940). They had 6 children:
        - Wanda (1892 in Achau, Austria – 1948 in Bozen) (m. 1921) Otto Aufschnaiter
        - Maria Theresa (b. 1894)
        - Maria Karolina (b. 1895)
        - Roman Edgar (1897 in Tannenmuhle – 1940 in Vienna)
        - Maria Priska (b. 1902)
        - Alexander Ludwig Karl Sułkowski (15 February 1893 in Ebenfurth – 27 March 1956 in Leoben) (m. 1st. 1919) Countess Feodora von Hardegg auf Glatz und im Machlande, divorced (?). They had one daughter. (m.2nd.1936) Anna Mallinger (1899 -) in Leoben. They had two children.
          - Alexandra
          - Maria Jadwiga (1938 in Vienna -)
          - Alexander Józef Sułkowski (23 March 1940 in Vienna) (m. 1st. 1967) Liliana Szczygiel, later divorced (m. 2nd. 1973) Helena Rajewska.

Descendants from this line are known to be living in Austria, Germany, Hungary and North America.

=== Descendants of Stanisław Sułkowski ===
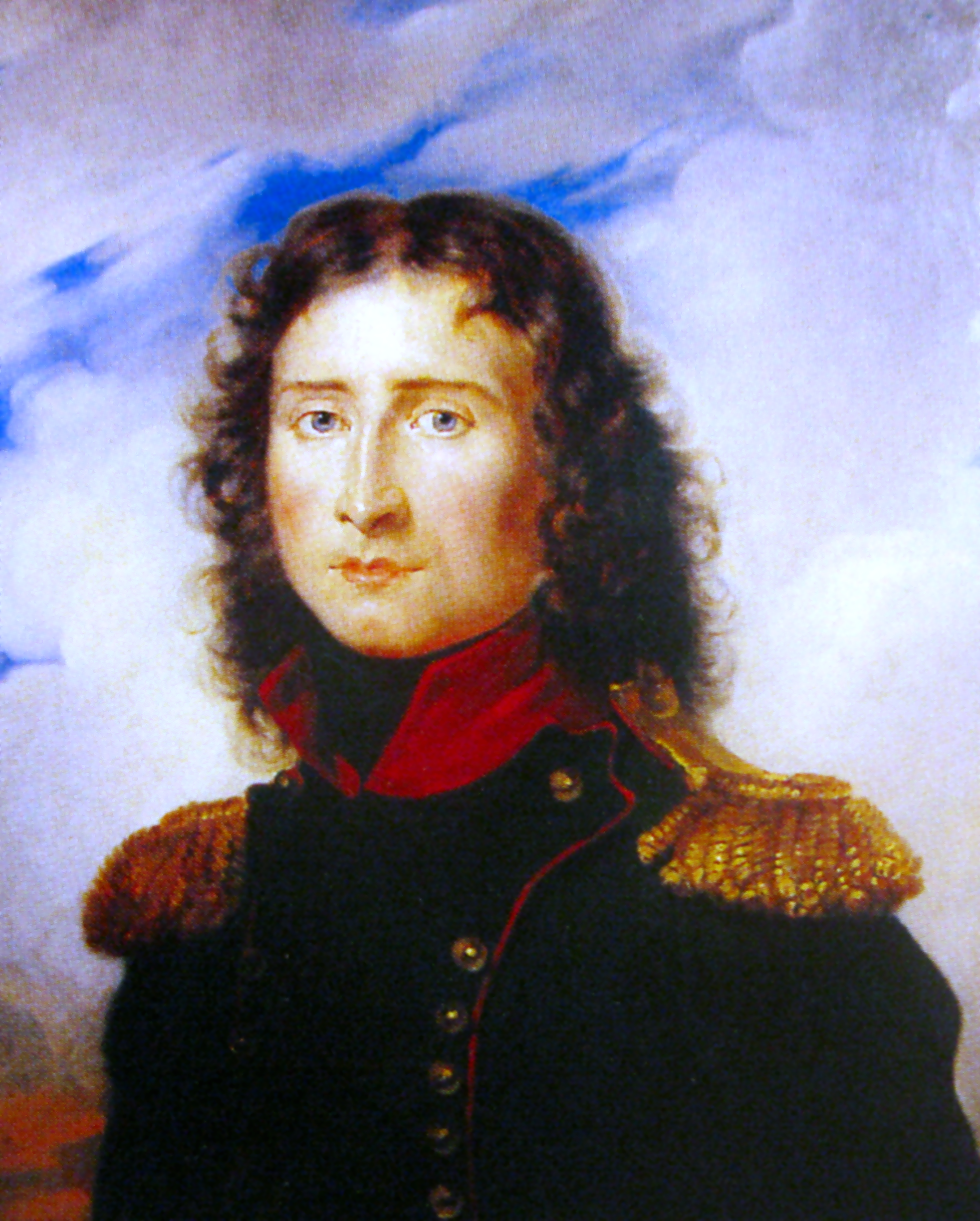
Józef Sułkowski; portrait by Antoni Brodowski

Stanisław and his wife went on to have four other children, who formed the gentry branch of the Sułkowski family. This family line, although gentry, do not carry princely titles.

1. Antoni (c. 1700 – c. 1753)
2. Michael (c. 1700 – 1747) He became a general in the army of Saxony, colonel. He never married.
3. Stanisław (d. 1749) He became a priest in Warsaw.
4. Elizabeth (m. 1st) Jakub Luba (m. 2nd) Kazimierz Nowosielski
- Antoni Sułkowski became a colonel in the army of Saxony. He married Rozalia Rauz. They had five children:
  - Stefan, was an army captain in 1740, lieutenant colonel in 1773. He married Miss Gramlich about 1742. They had no children.
  - Kazimierz (1729–1805) (m.1780) Ludwika Przyjemska. Became lieutenant colonel of the Polish army 1757, colonel 1770, general 1780. No record of children.
  - Ignacy (c. 1731 – 1795) (m.1st.1764) Ceclie Schiefert (m.2nd.1790) Josephine de Fernemont. He became General of the Polish army 1777. No record of children.
  - Helena (m.) Walenty Zbijewski – no record of children.
  - Teodor Sułkowski (1728–1792) (m.c. 1772) Julia Quelisk. Colonel of army 1777
    - Joseph Sułkowski (17 January 1773 – 22 October 1798). He took part in the Polish–Russian War of 1792 and was one of the first recipients of the newly created order Virtuti Militari. He became a captain in Napoleon Bonaparte's army, fighting in Italy in 1796. He served as Bonaparte's aide-de-camp, being knocked out while at his side at the Battle of Arcole. He participated in the Egyptian campaign and was wounded at the Battle of the Pyramids. He was killed near Cairo in a skirmish with insurgents. His name is inscribed on the Arc de Triomphe in Paris. He never married.

Descendants from this line have presumably continued until the present day.

Tadeusz Sułkowski – poet; b. 15.10.1907 in Skierniewice, Poland; d. 26.07.1960 in London. Father: Tadeusz, mother Florentyna Konarska. Studied Polish literature at Warsaw University. In September 1939 wounded in the battle of river Bzura, taken prisoner of war. Was in Oflag Murnau. After war ended reached the Polish Second Corps in Italy. Demobilized in London, he was manager of the home for Polish artists on Finchley Road, where he lived until his death. Many of his poems were printed in Polish magazines in England. A volume of his poetry was published in Poland in 1980.

== See also ==
- The Princely Houses of Poland
- Bielsko-Biała Museum
- 10th Regiment of Foot (Poland)
