= Józef Sułkowski =

Polish army officer (1773–1798)

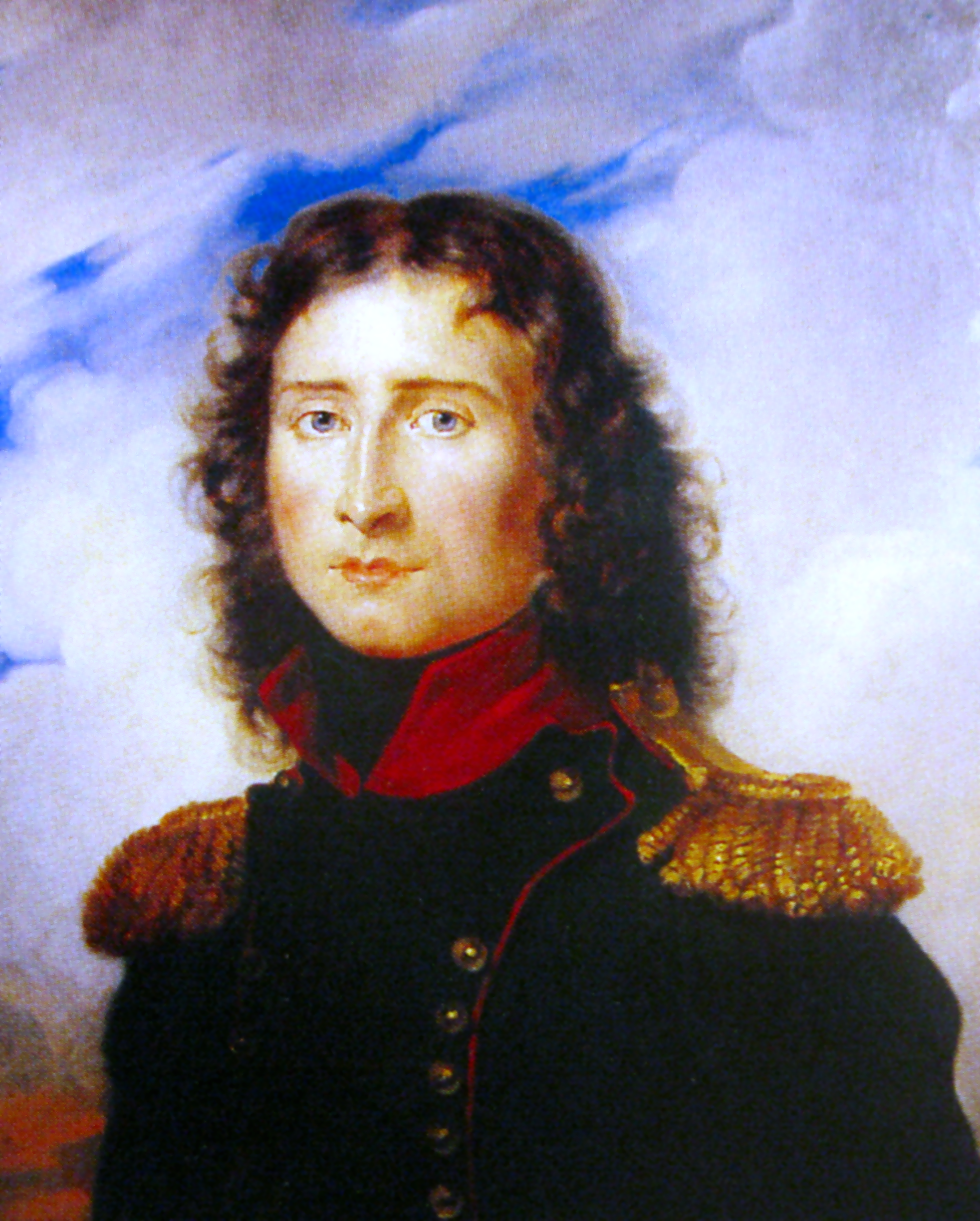
- Portrait by Antoni Brodowski, c. 1812
- Born: c. 18 January 1773; Győr, Hungary (Possibly)
- Died: 22 October 1798 (aged 25); Cairo, Ottoman Egypt
- Military career
- Allegiance: Crown of the Kingdom of Poland; Russian Empire; First French Republic
- Branch: Crown Army; Imperial Russian Army; French Revolutionary Army
- Service years: 1783–1798
- Rank: Chef d'escadrons (France)
- Units: Regiment of Foot of the Land of Rydzyna; Life Guard Horse Regiment
- Conflicts: Polish–Russian War of 1792; French Revolutionary Wars; Italian campaigns of the French Revolutionary Wars; Siege of Mantua (1796–1797); Battle of Castiglione; Battle of Arcole (WIA); Tyrolean expedition (1797); French invasion of Egypt and Syria; French invasion of Malta; Battle of Salahieh (WIA); Revolt of Cairo †

Chef d'escadrons Józef Sułkowski (French: Joseph Sulkowski; c. 18 January 1773 – 22 October 1798) was a Polish army officer who served in the Polish–Russian War of 1792 and the French Revolutionary Wars. Serving the French Revolutionary Army, he became a friend and aide-de-camp to Napoleon, accompanying him during the French invasion of Egypt and Syria. Sułkowski was killed by Cairene rebels during the Revolt of Cairo; his name was subsequently engraved on the Arc de Triomphe.

== Early life ==
Józef Sułkowski's date of birth and parentage have not been conclusively established. Born into the aristocratic Sułkowski family, the identity of his parents is not definitively known. According to the most likely history of his parentage, as stated by Sułkowski's guardian August Kazimierz Sułkowski, he was born on 18 January 1773 in Győr, Hungary, the son of Teodor Sułkowski and Julia Quelisk. Szymon Askenazy instead claimed that Sułkowski was born out of wedlock as the son of Franciszek de Paula Sułkowski and Marguerite Sophie de Fléville, who would go on to become Teodor's second wife. According to Władysław Konopczyński, Sułkowski's father was Franciszek and his mother was Maria Karolina Radziwiłł, who was divorced at the time. Tadeusz Korzon claimed that Antoni Sułkowski was Sułkowski's real father.

Julia died on 31 December 1773, after which Teodor retired from the Austrian army settled in Tokaj and later in Bielsko. It is likely that shortly after Julia's death Teodor entrusted Sułkowski to the care of his cousin Aleksander Antoni Sułkowski at his residence in Vienna. In 1777, August Sułkowski, Aleksander's brother, took Sułkowski to Poland. Following his arrival in Poland, Sułkowski was sent to Rydzyna under the care of the pianists Ildefons Zawadzki and Michał Sokolnicki. From 1779 onwards, Sułkowski traveled across Europe with August, visiting Paris, Naples, the Dutch Republic, Britain, Spain and Portugal. August considered Sułkowski to be a child prodigy, affectionately nicknaming him "Don Pepi" and envisioning a scholarly career for him. Upon their return to Poland, August granted him a Maltese commandery which came with a lifelong pension.

== Polish military career ==
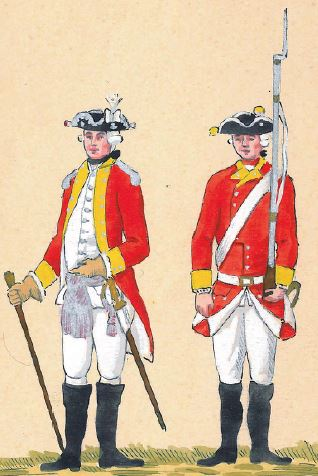
Illustration of the Regiment of Foot of the Land of Rydzyna in 1775

Sułkowski joined the Crown Army in 1783 as a cadet in Regiment of Foot of the Land of Rydzyna, which was stationed in Rydzyna. During a visit to Saint Petersburg, he received the rank of officer aspirant in the Imperial Russian Army's Life Guard Horse Regiment from Catherine the Great. In November 1786, he was promoted to lieutenant in the Crown Army, and in 1789 the 10th Regiment of Foot was relocated to Warsaw. There, Sułkowski witnessed the adoption of the Constitution of 3 May 1791, which he viewed as not being radical enough, a view Sułkowski expressed in his work The Last Cry of a Polish Citizen. During this period, he also came into conflict with Antoni, who after August's death managed his estate and sought to deprive Sułkowski of any inheritance.

Sułkowski served in the Polish–Russian War of 1792, where he carried reports from General Józef Judycki to the commander-in-chief of the Grand Ducal Lithuanian Army, Duke Louis of Württemberg. In June 1792, Sułkowski began serving in the vanguard of General Michał Zabiełło's army under Michał Wedelstedt, distinguishing himself as a capable and brave officer. After King Stanisław August Poniatowski joined the Targowica Confederation and Antoni was appointed as Grand Chancellor of the Crown, Sułkowski decided after being influenced by his friend Piotr Maleszewski to leave for France, where he arrived at the beginning of 1793.

== French military career and death ==
In France, Sułkowski wrote his memoirs and was soon granted French citizenship. During his time in France, he possibly married the daughter of the French orientalist Jean Michel de Venture de Paradis, whose sister Maleszewski had married. Sułkowski planned to make a name for himself in France in order to better assist in the struggle for Polish independence. He joined the French diplomatic service as an expert on Polish affairs, and was subsequently given a mission to travel to the Kingdom of Mysore, train the troops of Tipu Sultan and persuade him to go to war with the British East India Company. In May 1793 Sułkowski travelled to the Republic of Venice, and went from there to the Middle East. However, his journey was frustrated by British agents, and after Sułkowski's mission was exposed he decided to abandon it in Aleppo. Sułkowski travelled to Constantinople, where he attended a Jacobin meeting.

Upon hearing of the outbreak of the Kościuszko Uprising, Sułkowski began returning to Poland on 17 October 1794. On 21 October, while in Bucharest, he learned of the Polish defeat at Maciejowice, but nevertheless continued his journey towards Lviv. However, with his journey being frustrated by Austrian agents Sułkowski turned back and returned via Bucharest to Constantinople in January 1795. Having joined the French Revolutionary Army, on 1 May he was assigned to the Army of Italy commanded by General Napoleon Bonaparte. On 28 June Sułkowski arrived in Livorno, and Bonaparte assigned him to General André Masséna's division, where he was given the position of aide-de-camp at the rank of captain. Sułkowski proceeded to serve under General Jean-Mathieu-Philibert Sérurier at the siege of Mantua and under Bonaparte at Castiglione. Having discussed Polish independence with Bonaparte on Michał Kleofas Ogiński's behalf, on 27 October Sułkowski became one of Bonaparte's five aides-de-camp, and on 15 November was wounded at Arcole. Sułkowski subsequently took part in the Tyrolean expedition, the campaign against the Papal States and the fall of the Republic of Venice.

In 1798, Sułkowski participated in the French invasion of Egypt in the Army of the Orient under Bonaparte, distinguishing himself in the capture of Malta. Following the French arrival in Egypt on 1 July, Bonaparte promoted Sułkowski to the rank of chef d'escadrons on 6 July. On 11 August Sułkowski was badly wounded at the Battle of Salahieh, and afterwards was named a member of the Institut d'Égypte. Sułkowski was killed on 22 October by Cairene rebels during the Revolt of Cairo; his body was not buried properly and was left to rot and be eaten by animals. Upon hearing of his death Bonaparte expressed remorse and, asked why he did not honour him more when he was alive, replied "On first meeting him, I saw in him a commander in chief".
