= Feliks Kryski =

Polish nobleman

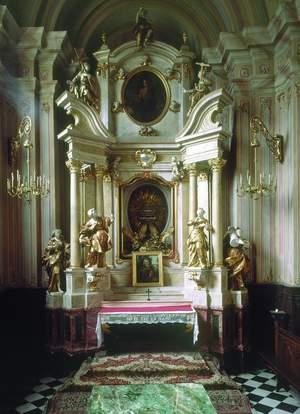
Kryskis' Chapel, Church of St. Anne in Warsaw, Poland

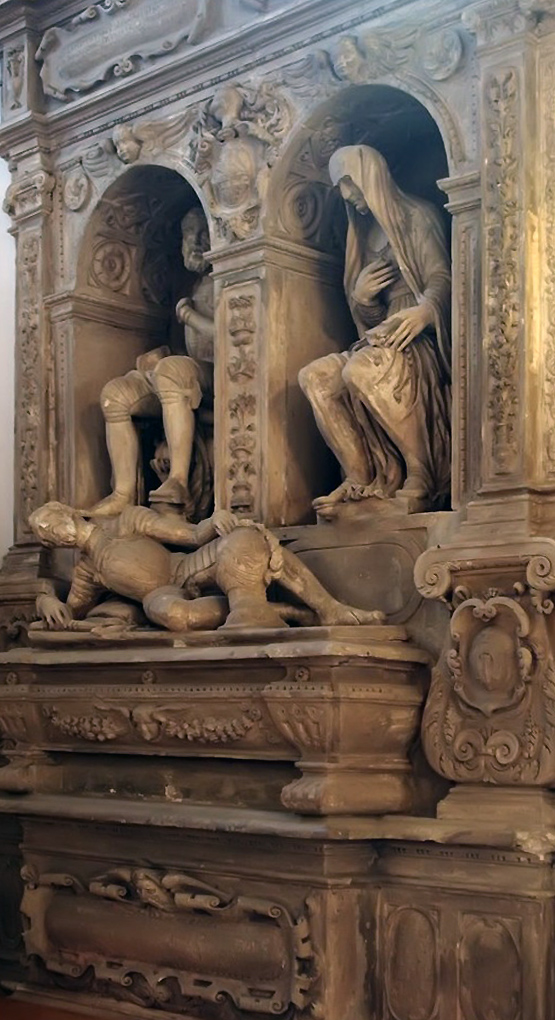
Kryski's tomb in Drobin

Feliks Szczęsny Kryski (1562 – 10 February 1618) was a Polish nobleman, politician, writer, and orator. He was Grand Chancellor of Poland from 1613 until his death.

== Biography ==
Kryski was a Polish nobleman of the line of Mazovian dukes that first came to power in 1429. He was born in 1562 in Drobin, the son of Stanislav Kryski and Margaret Uchanska and brother to Wojciech Kryski.

Kryski was a speaker in the sejms of 1603 and 1607. He was an ardent supporter of King Sigismund III, supporting him in his clashes with Jan Zamoyski's party. Kryski was a close associate of Grand Marshal of the Crown, Zygmunt Myszkowski and through these connections he became one of the closest advisers of Sigismund III. He held the title of Wojski of Zakroczym.

During the Zebrzydowski Rebellion he stood faithfully by the monarch. His polemical writing Deklaracja pana wojewody krakowskiego refuted allegations by rebels. In 1609 he became the Deputy Chancellor of the Crown. He prepared an expedition to Russia, organizing pro-war propaganda. He published several letters including the Diskurs słusznej wojny z Moskwą, rationes pro et contra. He accompanied the king in the expedition to Moscow in 1610. On the Russian border he made a speech in which he congratulated the Polish king's successful entry to Russia.

He was an uncompromising advocate of the annexation of Russia. In 1611 he organized a solemn homage to Sigismund III captured the tsar Vasily Shuiski and his family. In 1612 he accompanied the king in his siege of Moscow. In 1613 he became the Grand Chancellor of the Crown. His predecessor was Jan Zbigniew Ossoliński and upon Kryski's death his successor was Stanisław Białłozor.

Kryski died in the year 1618 and was buried in the Kryskis' Chapel, Church of St. Anne in Warsaw, Poland by his widow Sophia Łubienska. To commemorate the deceased, his widow founded a separate chapel, around the year 1620, on the northern facade of the church, a rectangular plan made of brick, plastered and covered with a dome, as if embedded in a four-sided roof with a lantern, topped with a cross. Its walls were decorated with intersecting pairs of Tuscan pilasters on high pedestals. Felix's son Paul Kryski, standard-bearer of King Sigismund III, Kowelski governor, and several years later – Łubienski Kryska Zofia was buried in the basement of the chapel when he died in 1650. (zmarl.1624 ) Everybody buried in the chapel is commemorated with an epitaph, embedded into the wall.
