= Rydzyna Castle =

Baroque castle in Rydzyna, Poland

Royal Castle in Rydzyna
- Zamek Królewski w Rydzynie (Polish)
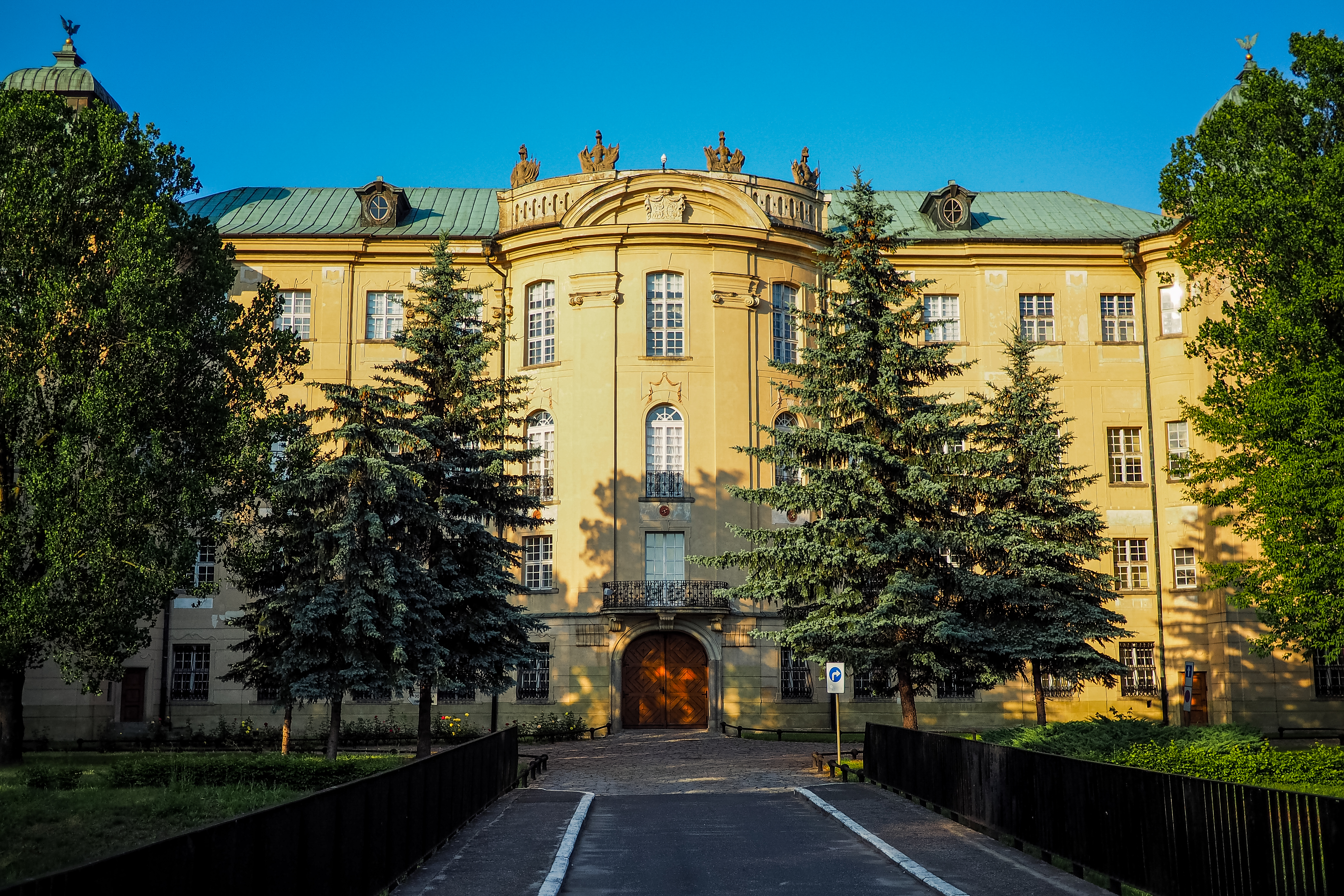
- Western façade

- Location within Poland
- 51°47′15″N 16°40′16″E
- Location: Rydzyna, Poland

Site notes
- Architectural style: Baroque
- Owner: Polish Society of Mechanical Engineers and Technicians

Historic Monument of Poland
- Designated: 2017-03-15
- Part of: Rydzyna - residential and urban ensemble
- Reference no.: Dz. U. z 2017 r. poz. 662

The Rydzyna Castle [rɨˈd͡zɨna] is a Baroque castle in Rydzyna, Poland. It was built in the beginning of the 15th century by Jan of Czernina. At the end of the 17th century, Italian architects Joseph Simon Bellotti and Pompeo Ferrari erected the present Baroque castle on its ancient foundations. The first owners of the castle were the Leszczyński family. Together with a park and surrounding areas, it was one of the most splendid palaces in Greater Poland.

== Italian heritage ==
The residence was built by Giuseppe Simon Belotti from Lugano, at the end of the 17th century. Not only was he an architect but also a manager of stucco workshops and a supervisor of decorative works made by Italian plasterers and sculptors. Belotti designed the Leszczyńskis' Palace in 'palazzo in modo fortezza' style, following the example of Poggio Reale by Sebastiano Serlio (Serliano). Another Italian artist who settled in Poland, Michelangelo Palloni from Florence, decorated ceilings in the palace in Rydzyna with splendid frescos. At the beginning of the 18th century, Pompeo Ferrari came to Rydzyna. He was a talented architect from Rome, laureate of the St. Lucas Academy. He settled here for the rest of his life and after his death in 1736 was buried in the parish church. Pompeo Ferrari designed the Rydzyna palace reconstruction which was the beginning of the famous urban planning of Rydzyna, whose aim was to join the palace and the town in a harmonious composition. Apart from that he was a designer of other magnificent buildings in Wielkopolska (Greater Poland). Other artists under the artistic patronage of the Leszczyński family were three brothers Catenazzi from Morbio Inferiore in Mendrisiotto, (in Ticino, Switzerland). The splendid heritage of the past has been carefully protected in Rydzyna, where people always remember creators of beauty.

== Leszczyński residence ==
From 1704–1709 it was the residence of Polish king Stanisław Leszczyński. In 1709, during the Great Northern War, the castle was partly burnt by the tsar's soldiers. However, wall-paintings and stucco works in the representative rooms, made by Italian artists, were not destroyed completely. After this period Stanisław Leszczyński was forced to abdicate the Polish throne and was exiled to France. After years, as Duke of Lorraine, he became a famed as a charitable and wise sovereign. His daughter Maria became Queen of France in 1725 as the wife of Louis XV and was the grandmother of King Louis XVI. Marie became a popular Queen in France widely admired by the ordinary Frenchman for her extensive charitable works to the poor.

== Sułkowski Residence ==
Stanisław Leszczyński sold his estates in Poland to Aleksander Józef Sułkowski. The new owner improved the castle. The Silesian architect Karl Martin Frantz changed roofs, added Rococo decorations and the monumental main gate. He also rebuilt the parish church and the town. The son of Aleksander Joseph, Prince August, continued the expansion. Classical ornamentation was added to the Ballroom. The outbuildings and Orangerie were added to the north of the palace. At the end of the 18th century, the residence of the Sułkowski princes, with open-air theater and high school of Piarist Fathers, was the most important cultural and educational center in Great Poland.

== Under Prussian Rule ==
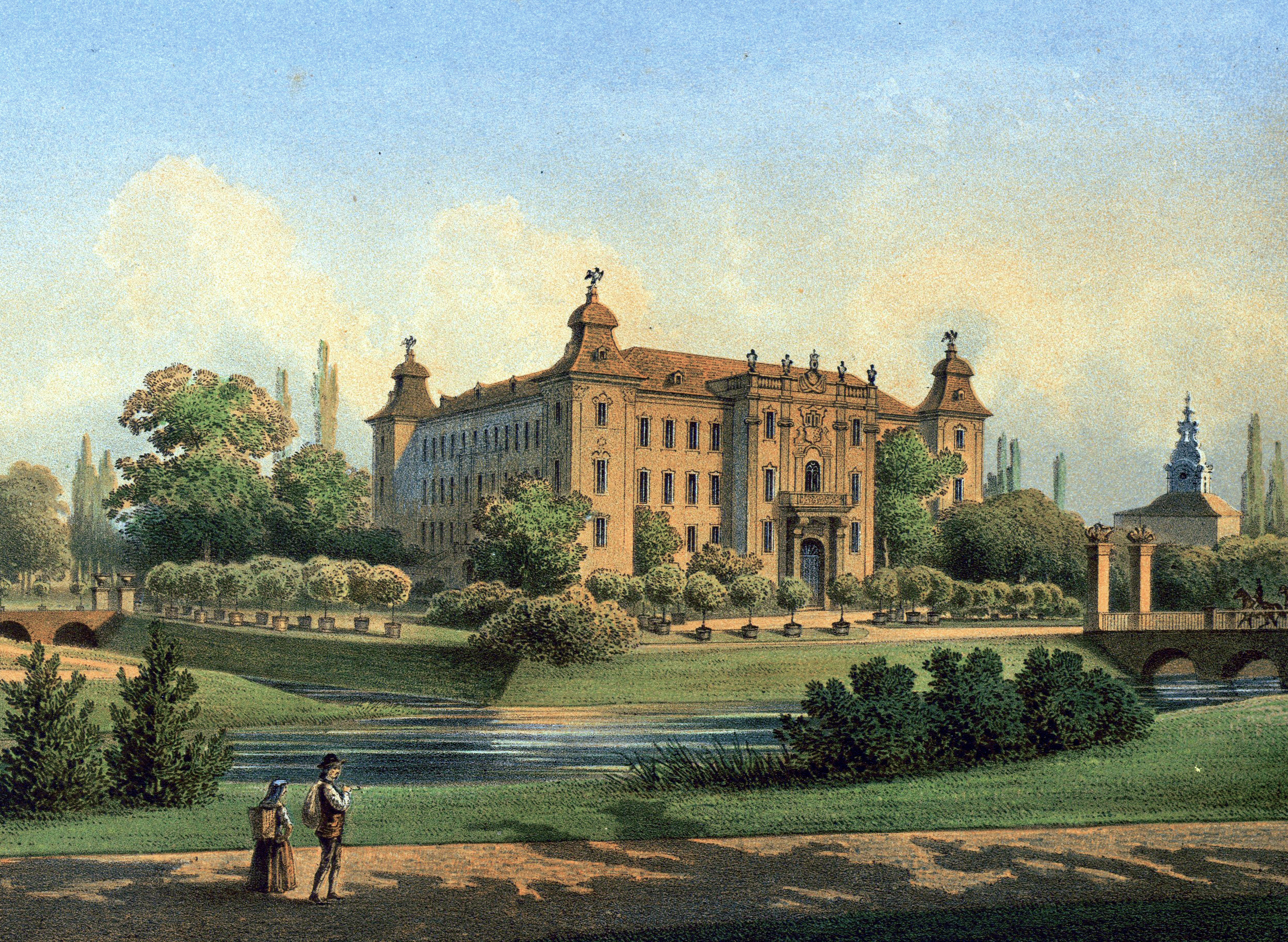
Sułkowski Castle in Rydzyna, ca. 1883

After the Second Partition of Poland in 1793, the architectural development in Rydzyna ceased. Two of the Sułkowskis of Rydzyna were covered with glory: brave and talented Joseph Sułkowski, the aide-de-camp of Napoleon, killed in action at Cairo and his cousin Anthony Paul - the fourth Sułkowski owner of Rydzyna - whose name is inscribed on the Arch de Triomphe in Paris. The last Prince Sułkowski died childless in 1909. The Castle was taken over by Prussian authorities. In 1919 the Versailles Treaty gave it back to Poland.

== Rydzyna Castle after 1919 ==
In accordance with the statutes of the Sułkowski family that had been established by Prince August in 1775 with the approval of the Polish Parliament, the Educational Foundation of the Sułkowski family was restored in 1924. In 1928 boarding school for boys- the Sułkowski School, was established under the direction of professor Tadeusz Łopuszanski, who had very interesting and innovative ideas about education.

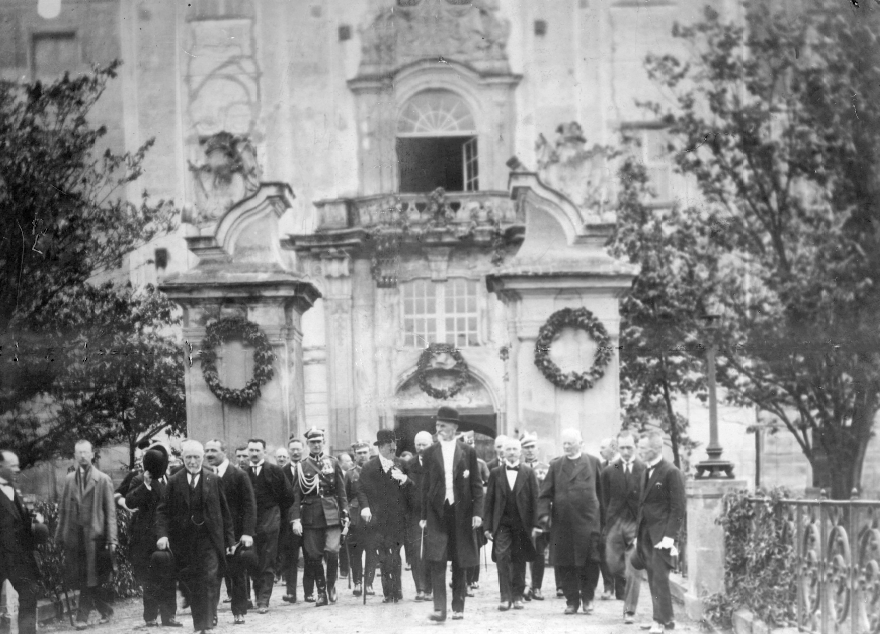
President of Poland Stanisław Wojciechowski visiting the castle in 1925

== World War II until present day ==
During the German occupation, 1939–1945, a "Hitlerjugend" (see National Political Institutes of Education) school was placed in the castle. At the end of January 1945 the Castle in Rydzyna was burnt by the Red Army. The severely damaged Castle awaited a new owner until 1970, when was taken over by The Association of Polish Mechanical Engineers (S.I.M.P.) and rebuilt according to documents and photographs from before World War II. The work was completed in 1989. In 1994 the castle was awarded by the prestigious international organization Europa Nostra in recognition of the excellence of the restoration work. Original equipment and furnishing from the Castle were lost before World War I. The main Baroque rooms were completely restored to their original grandeur according to the historic documentation. In the castle collections there are: old furniture, historical drawings, remembrances of the Sułkowski family, nature collections e.g.: tropical butterflies, hunting trophies. In the library one can find documentation connected with the previous owners of the Castle, The Sułkowski Grammar School and The Association of Polish Mechanical Engineers.

== Gallery ==
Northern façade

Eastern façade

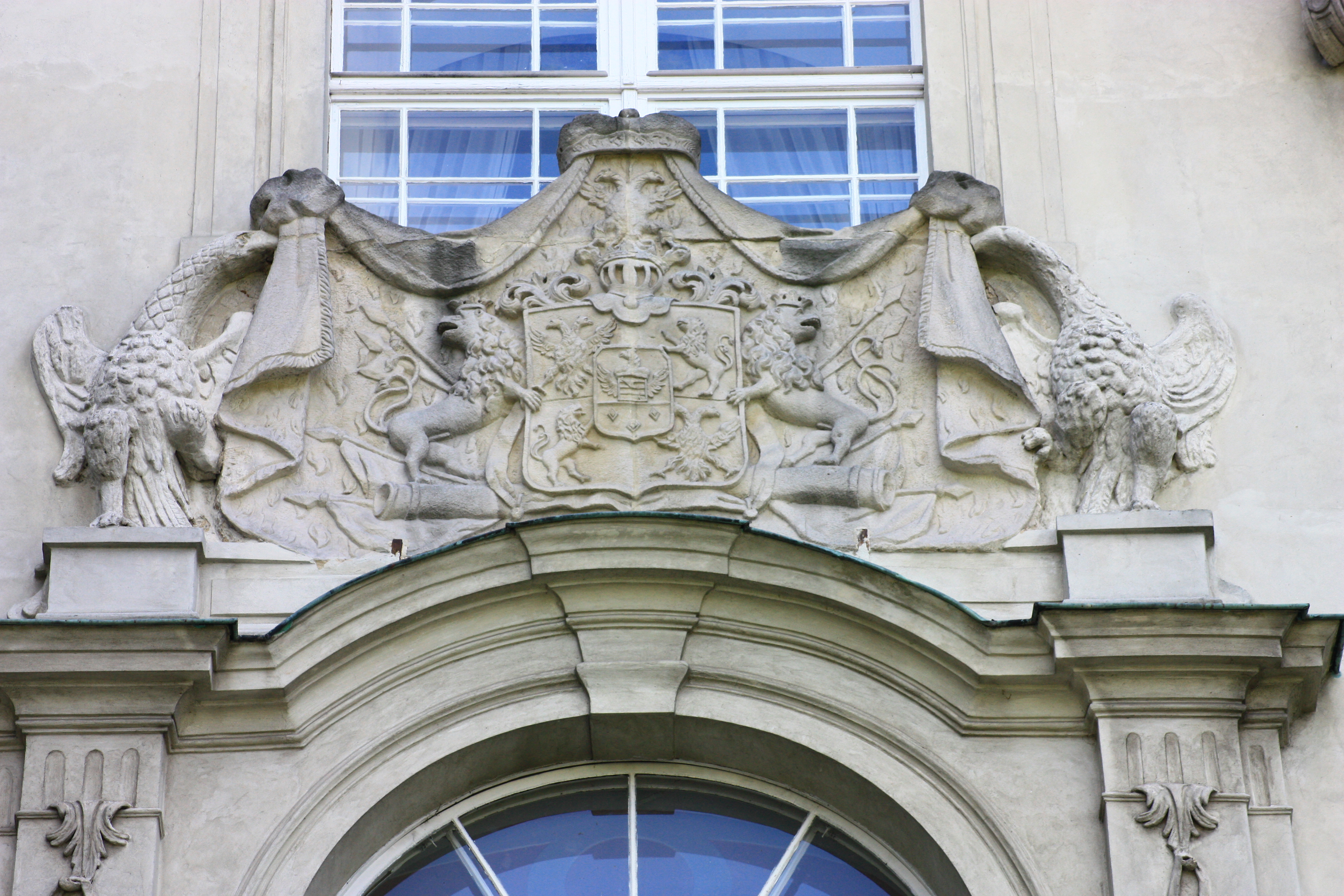
Bas-relief with the coat of arms of the Sułkowski family

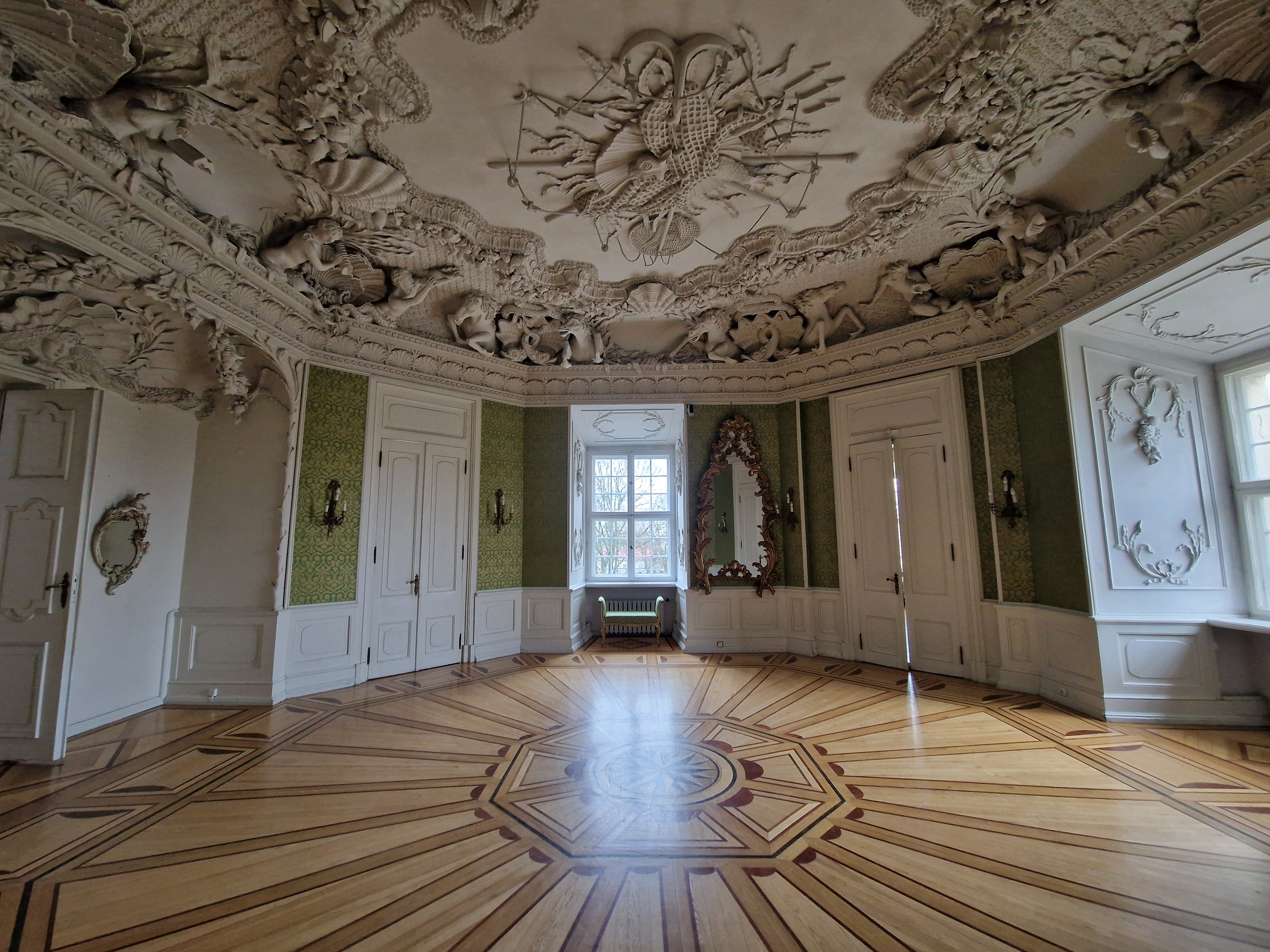
Interior

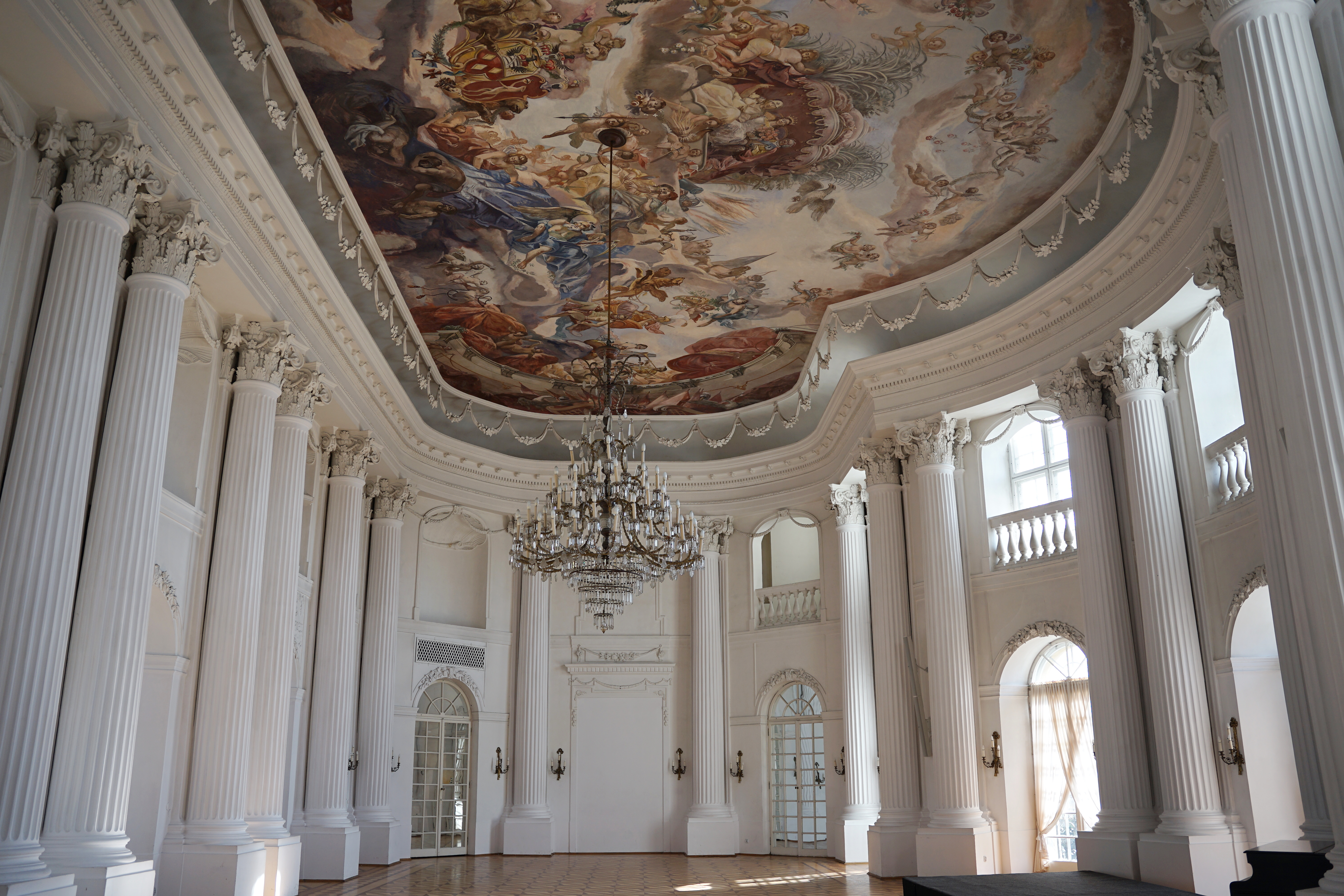
Interior

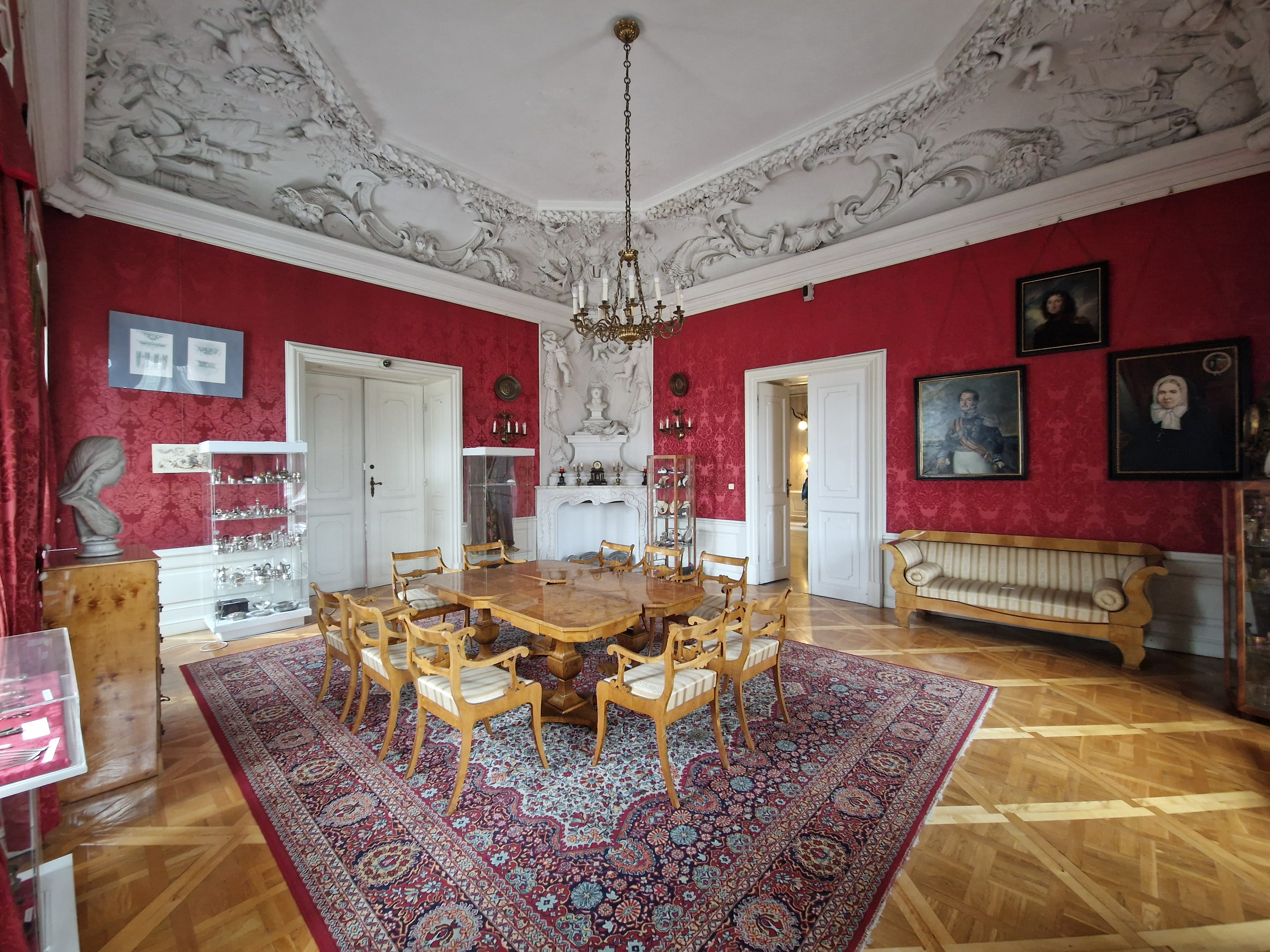
Interior

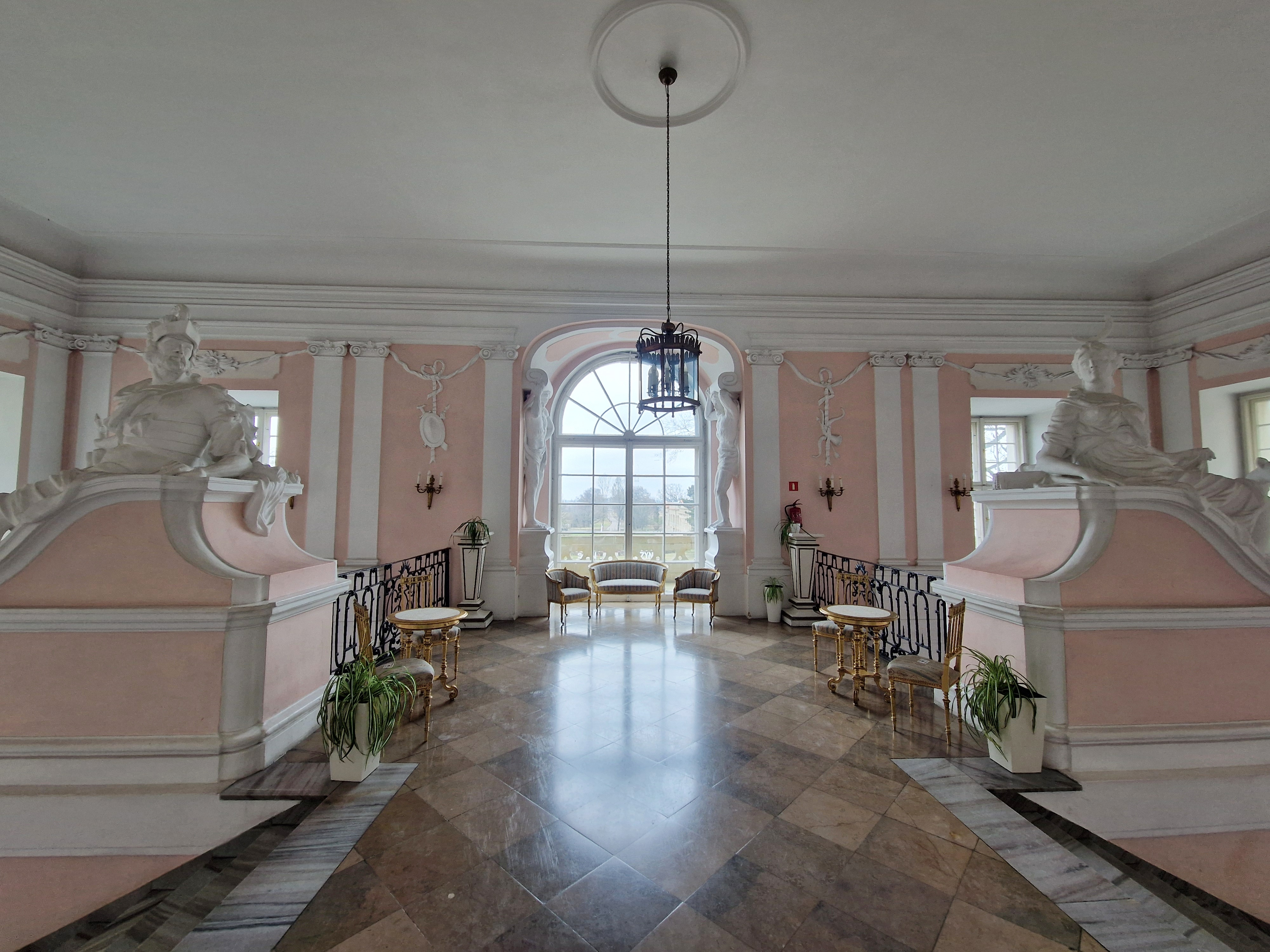
Interior

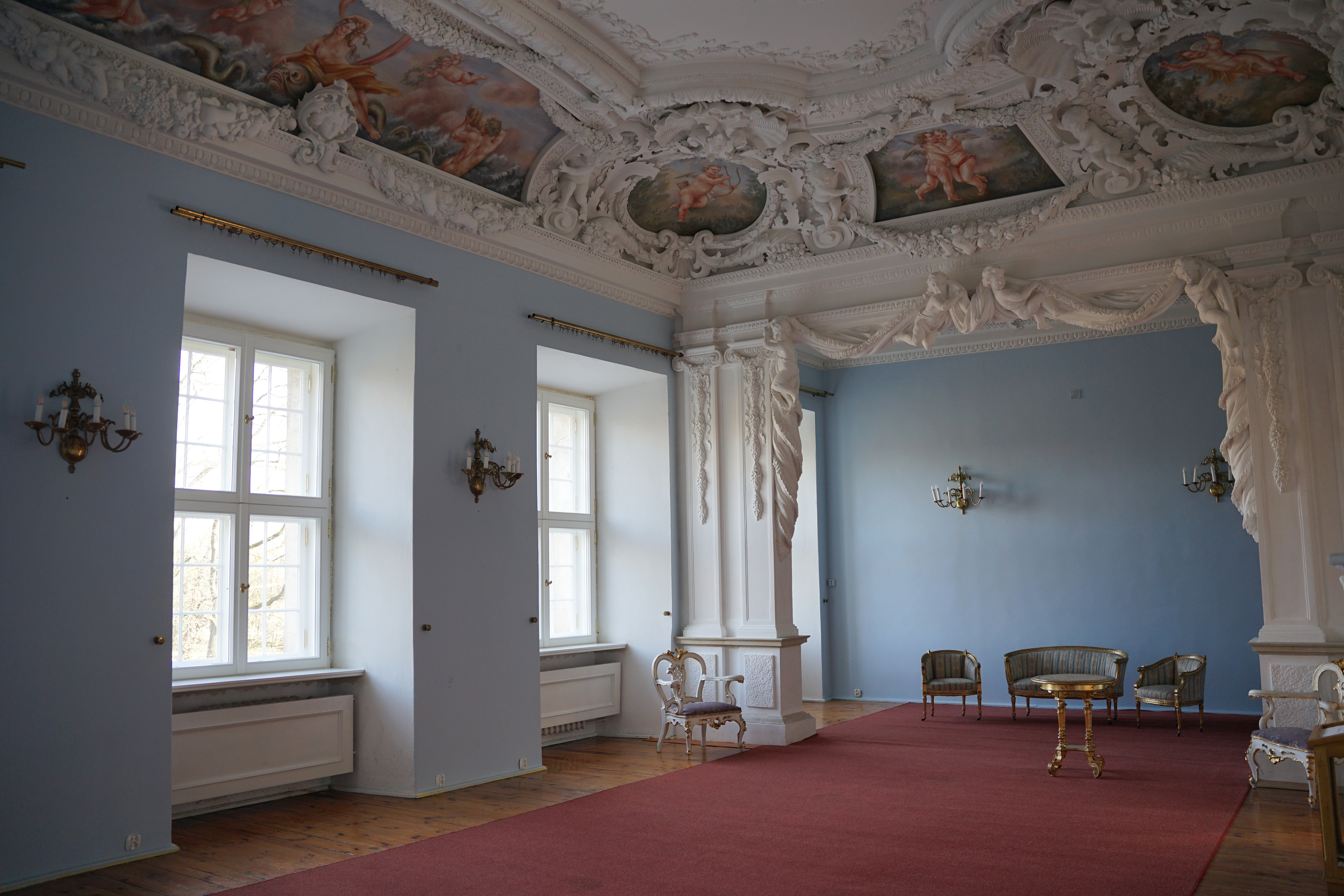
Interior

== See also ==
- Castles in Poland
