= Rydzyna =

Town in Greater Poland Voivodeship, Poland

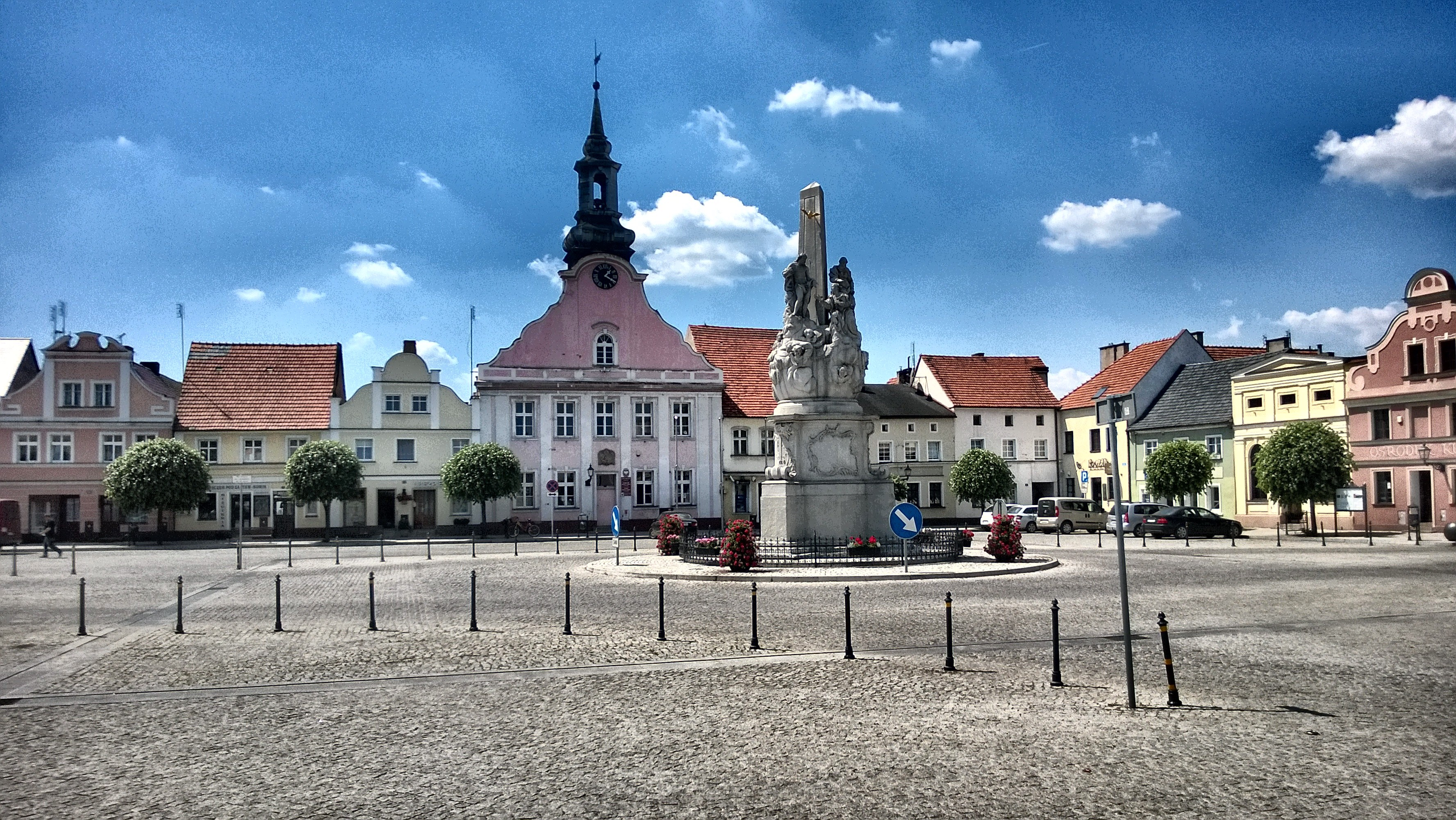
- Rynek (Market Square) with the Baroque town hall and Holy Trinity column

- Flag Coat of arms
- Nicknames: Pearl of Polish Baroque
- Location within Poland
- Coordinates: 51°48′N 16°40′E
- Country: Poland
- Voivodeship: Greater Poland
- County: Leszno
- Gmina: Rydzyna
- Founded: Early 15th century

Area
  - Total: 2.17 km^{2} (0.84 sq mi)

Population (2006)
  - Total: 2,539
  - Density: 1,170/km^{2} (3,030/sq mi)
- Time zone: UTC+1 (CET)
  - Summer (DST): UTC+2 (CEST)
- Postal code: 64-130
- Vehicle registration: PLE
- Website: http://www.rydzyna.pl

Historic Monument of Poland
- Designated: 2017-03-15
- Reference no.: Dz. U. z 2017 r. poz. 662

Rydzyna (pronounced RI-DZI-NA [rɨˈd͡zɨna]) is a historic town in western Poland, located in the southern part of the Greater Poland Voivodeship, 10 km south of Leszno, in the Leszno County.

The town's population is 2,446 (2006).

Rydzyna is a former residential city of prominent Polish magnate families of Leszczyński and Sułkowski, including King Stanisław Leszczyński. It is commonly referred to as "the pearl of Polish Baroque" due to its preserved Old Town with a high abundance of historical monuments, which is designated a Historic Monument of Poland.

== History ==
It was founded at the beginning of the 15th century by Jan from Czernina, a descendant of the Wierzbno family, a knight of king Władysław II Jagiełło. Rydzyna was a private town, administratively located in the Kościan County in the Poznań Voivodeship in the Greater Poland Province of the Polish Crown. At the end of the 17th century the town and its environs were owned by well-known magnates, the Leszczyński and then the Sułkowski families, whose investment in the town resulted in its current nickname as "the pearl of the Polish baroque". The 11th Polish Infantry Regiment was stationed in Rydzyna.

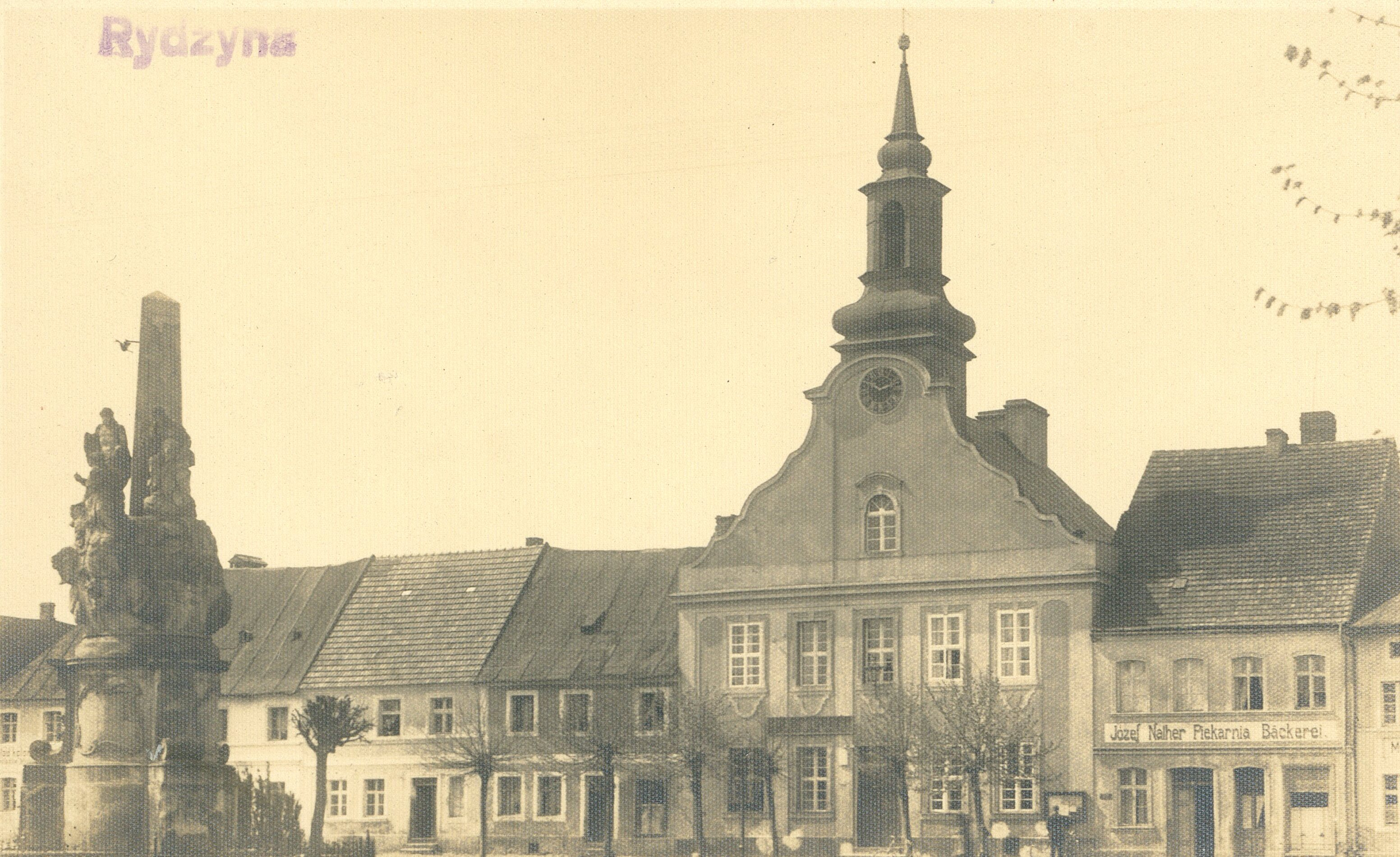
Early 20th-century view of the Market Square

In the Second Partition of Poland, in 1793, the town was annexed by Prussia. After the successful Greater Poland uprising of 1806, it was regained by Poles and included within the short-lived Duchy of Warsaw, and following its dissolution in 1815, it was reannexed by Prussia. In 1871, the town became part of Germany and was known as Reisen in German. Until 1887, Reisen belonged to the Fraustadt district in the Prussian Province of Posen. From 1887 to 1920, it was part of the Lissa district. According to the census of 1905, the town had a population of 1,123, of which 814 (72.5%) were Germans and 309 (27.5%) were Poles. After World War I, Poland regained independence as the Second Polish Republic, and then regained the town in accordance to the Treaty of Versailles.

During the German invasion of Poland which started World War II in September 1939, the town was occupied by the Wehrmacht. It was annexed by Nazi Germany and was incorporated into the newly formed province of Reichsgau Wartheland. From October 1939 to February 1940, during the Intelligenzaktion, the Germans carried out mass executions of Poles from the Leszno County, including Rydzyna, in the forest near the town. In February 1940, the Germans arrested local Polish parish priest Aleksander Sterczewski, who was imprisoned in Rawicz, then deported to concentration camps and killed in Dachau (see Nazi persecution of the Catholic Church in Poland). The local Polish police chief was murdered by the Russians in the Katyn massacre in 1940. Towards the end of the war, the town was captured by the Red Army in the spring of 1945 and was restored to Poland.

== Sights ==
=== Rydzyna Castle ===
The most historically important site in Rydzyna is Rydzyna Castle, formerly the residence of king Stanisław I and the Sułkowski princes. The castle in Rydzyna was built at the beginning of 15th century by Jan of Czernina. At the end of the 17th century, Italian architects Joseph Simon Bellotti and Pompeo Ferrari erected the present Baroque castle on its ancient foundations. The first owners of the castle were the Leszczyński family. Together with its park and surrounding areas, it was one of the most splendid palaces in Poland. Between 1704 and 1709 it was a residence of the Polish king Stanisław I. In 1709, during the Great Northern War, the castle was partly burnt by the tsar's soldiers. However wall-paintings and stucco works in representative rooms, made by the best Italian artists, were not destroyed completely, and the castle was restored and expanded by Prince Aleksander Józef Sułkowski, who purchased the Leszczyński estates in 1738. The castle, together with its adjacent park and the surrounding terrain, forms one of the most valuable castle-park complexes in Poland.

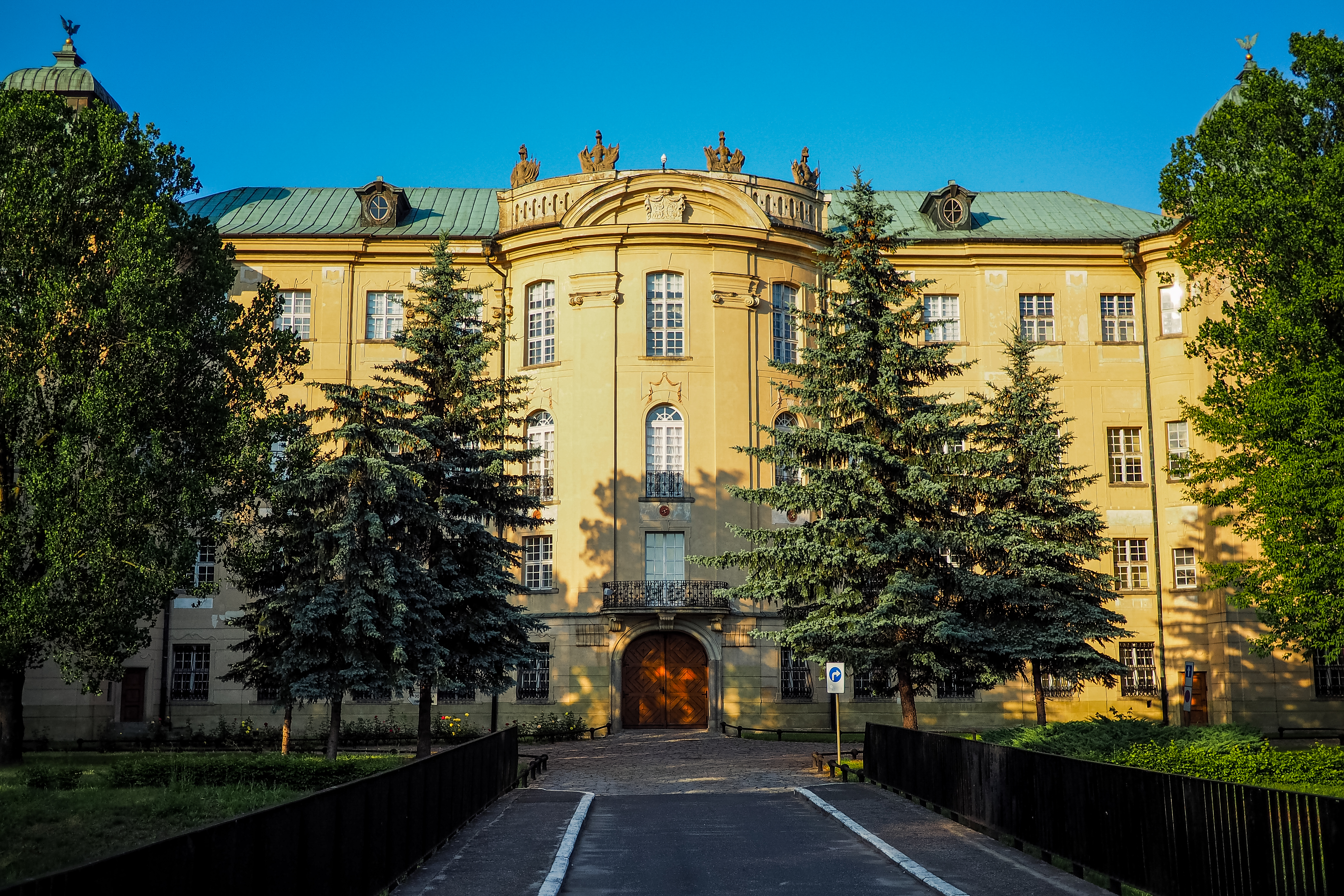
Western façade

Northern façade

Eastern façade

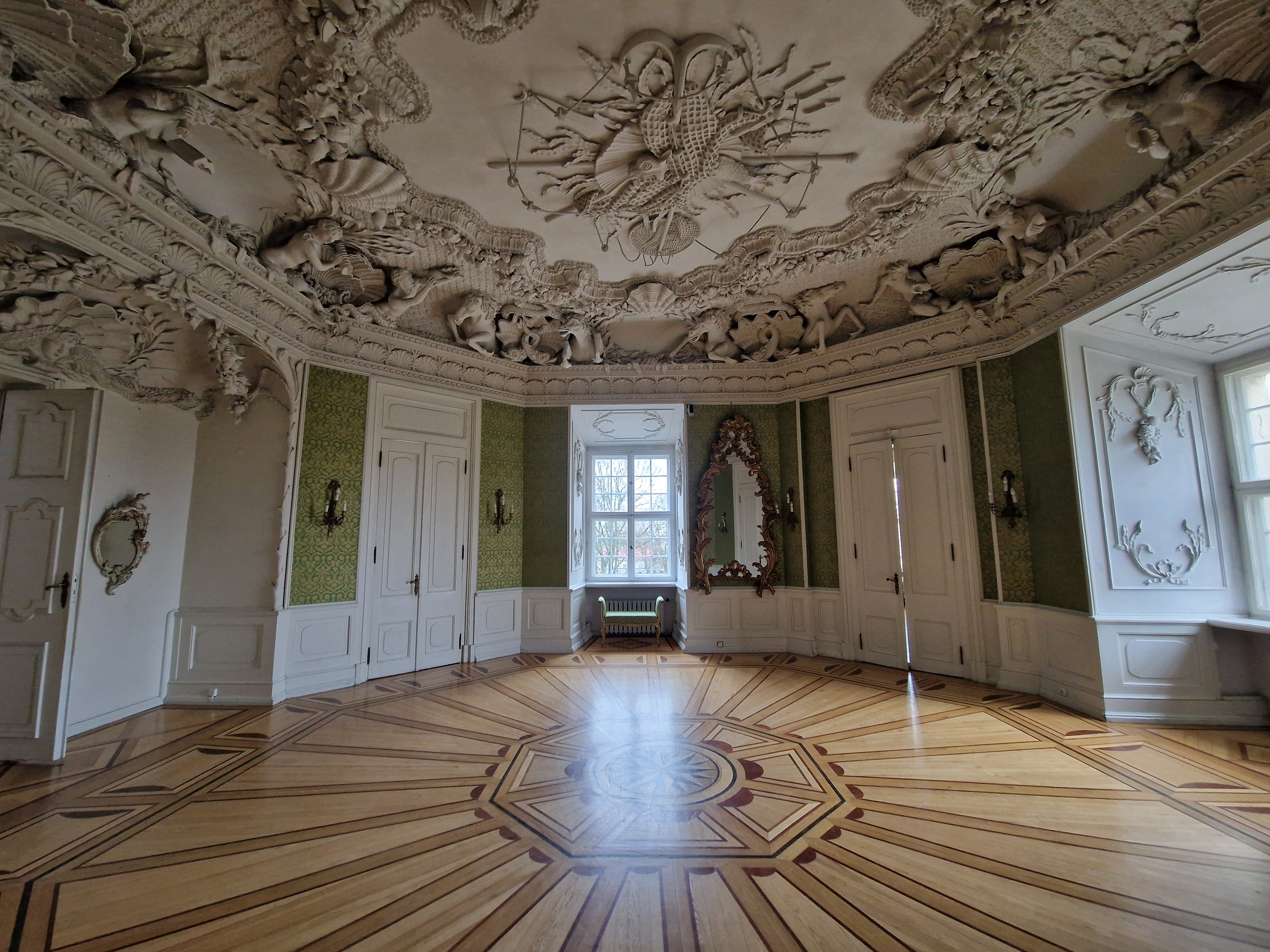
Interior

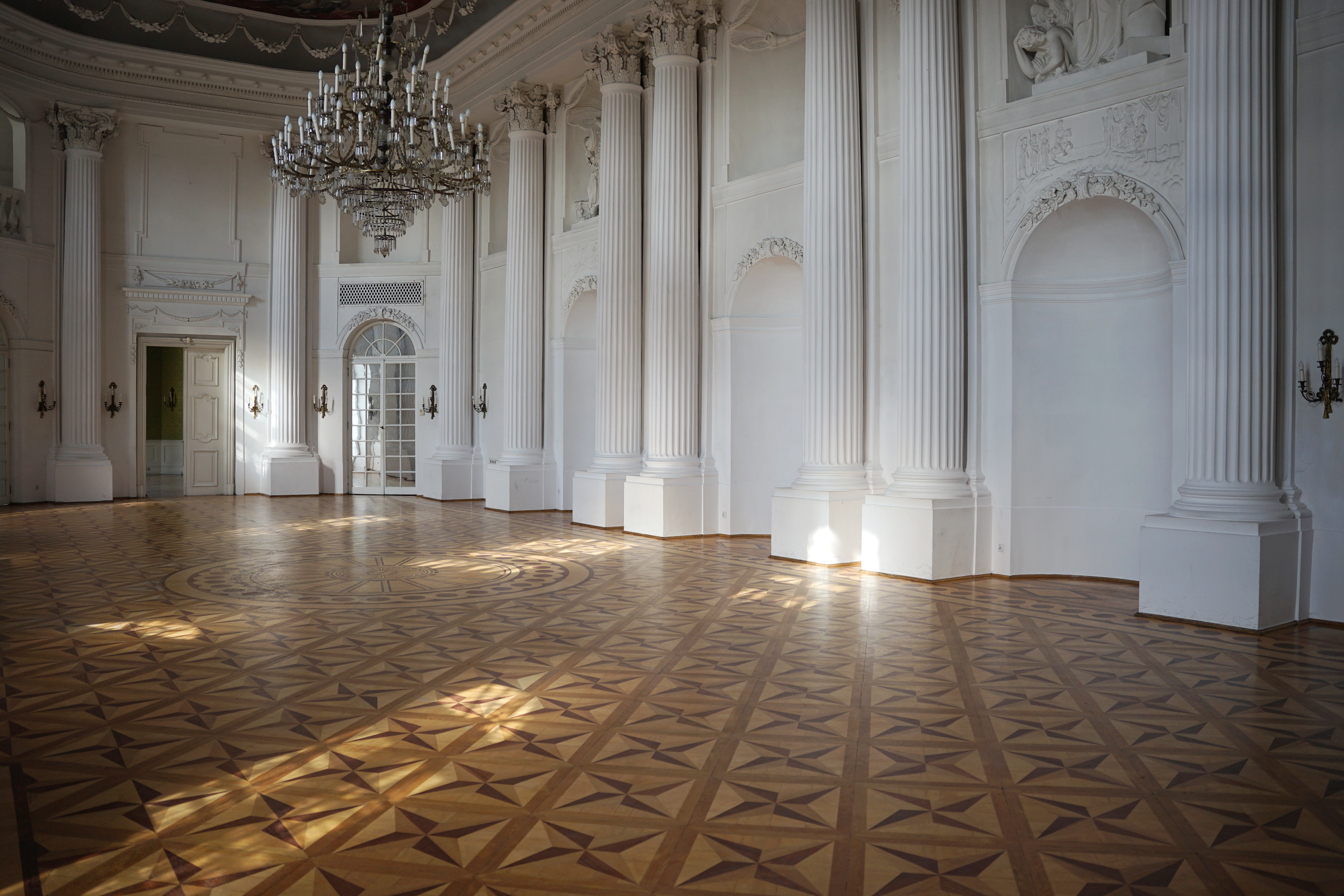
Interior

=== Other historical sites ===
Other historical monuments in Rydzyna are baroque tenement houses around the Rynek (Market Square) together with the town hall and the baroque parish church, all built in the 18th century and designed by the same architects as the castle. The evangelical church building now serves as a concert hall. In the center of the Market Square a unique Holy Trinity column was erected in 1761 by sculptor Andrew Schmidt in memory of the plague that decimated the town in 1709. The monumental former annexes to the castle, facing its north side, are in Classic style. All the monuments are the works of prominent architects brought in from all over Europe by the Leszczyński and Sułkowski families.

At one time there were over 40 windmills around Rydzyna. Today only one remains, the "Józef" windmill from the 18th century, which was renovated in 2003. It now houses the Museum of Agriculture and Milling.

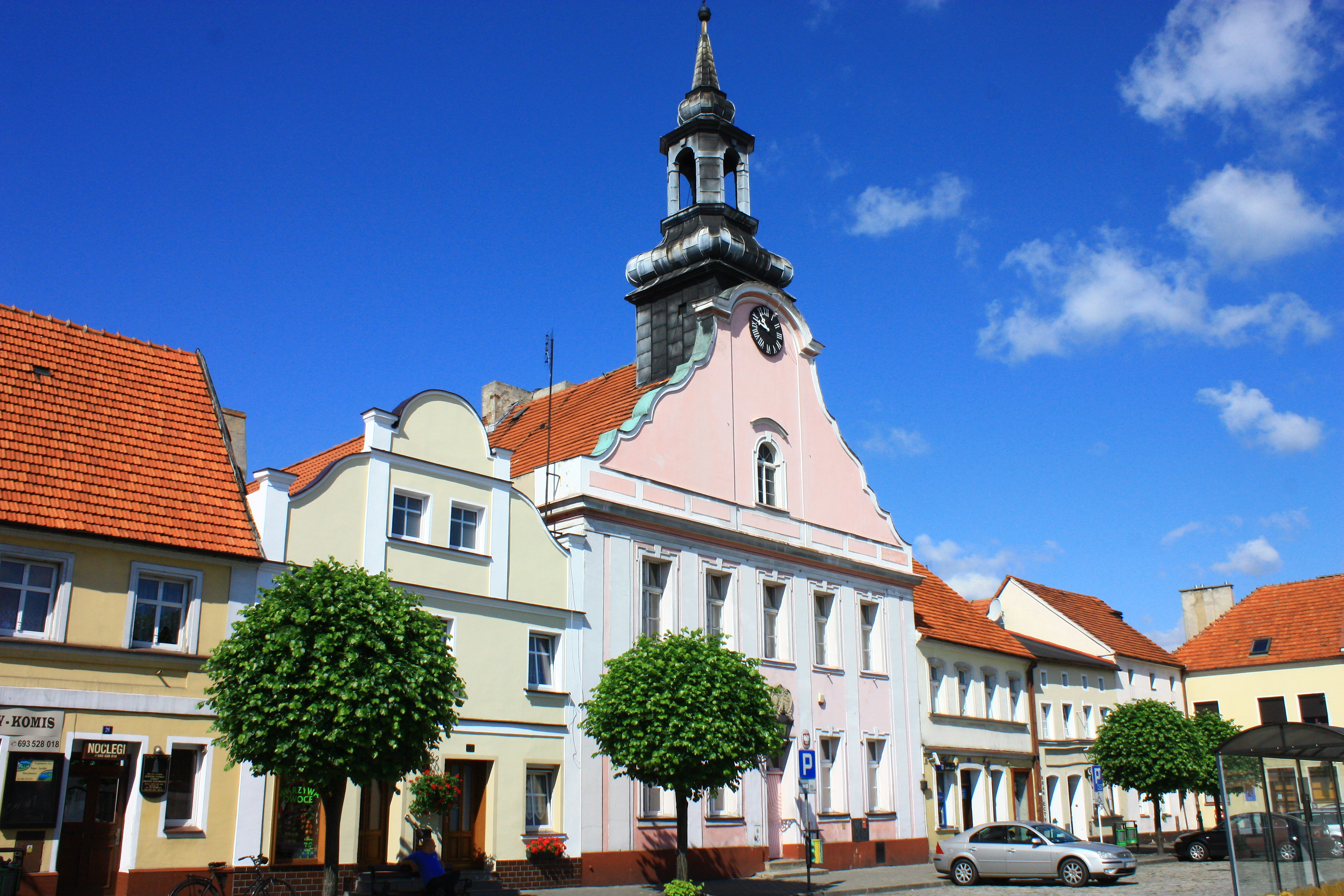
Town hall

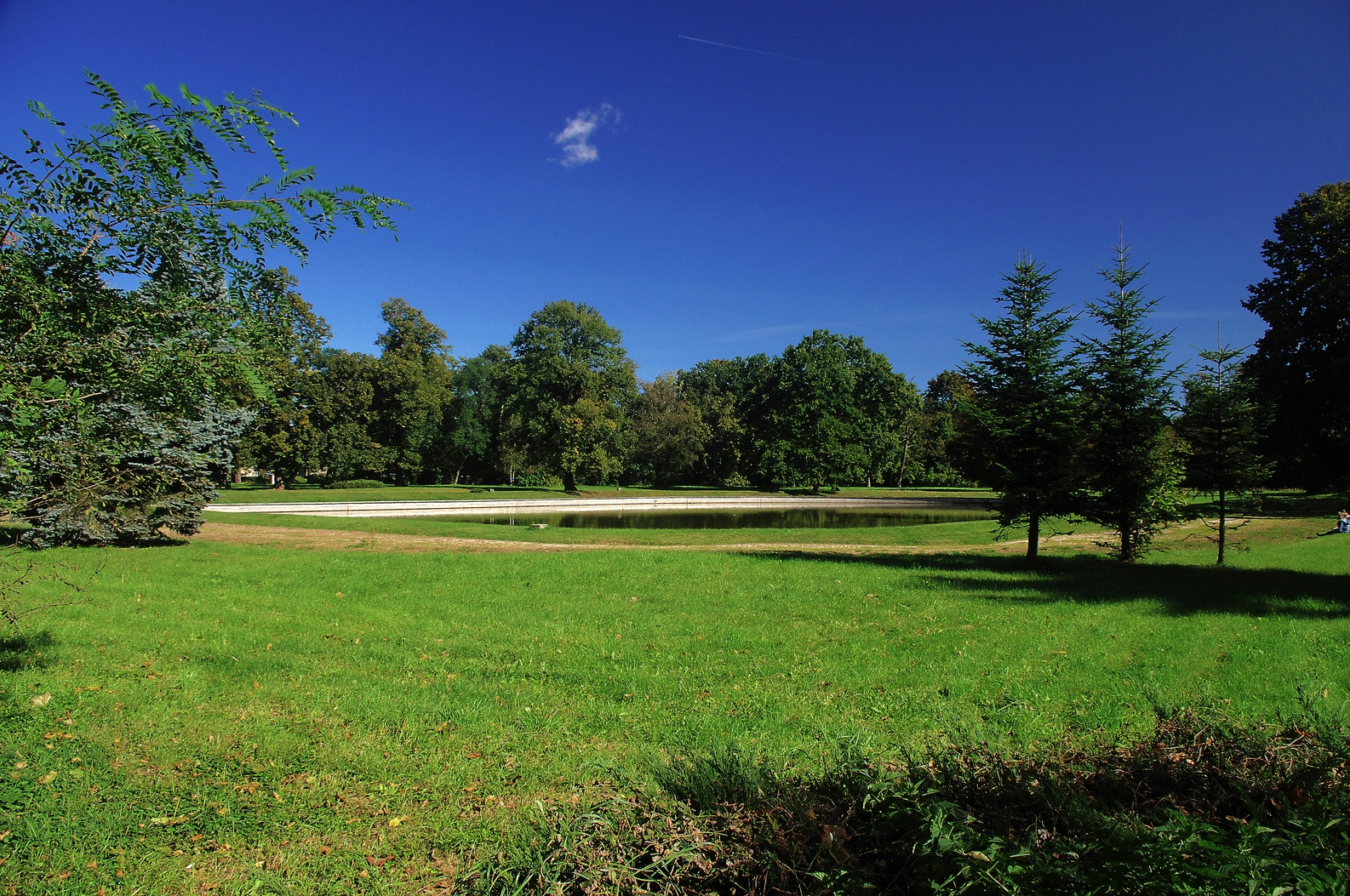
Castle park

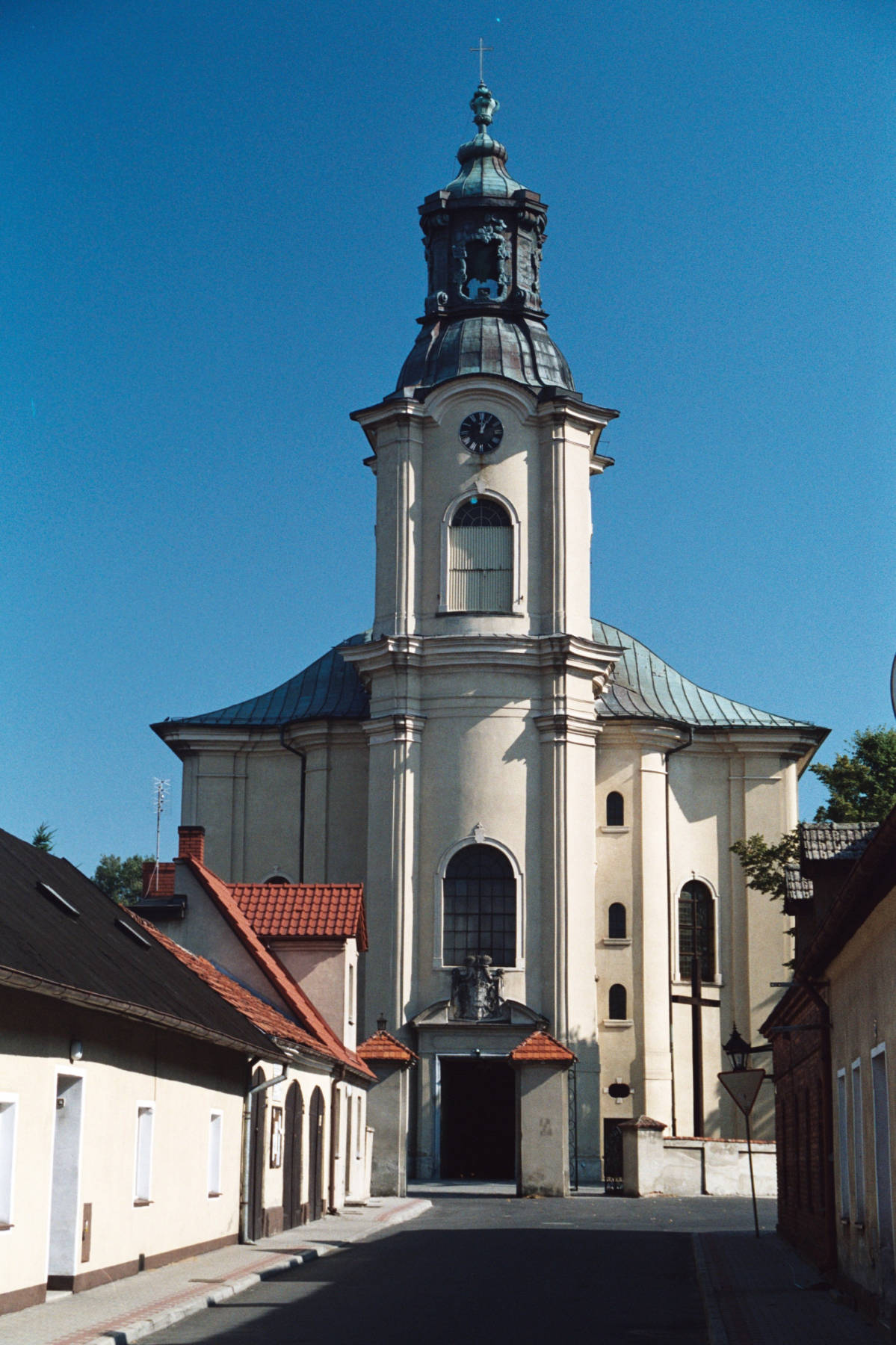
St. Stanislaus church

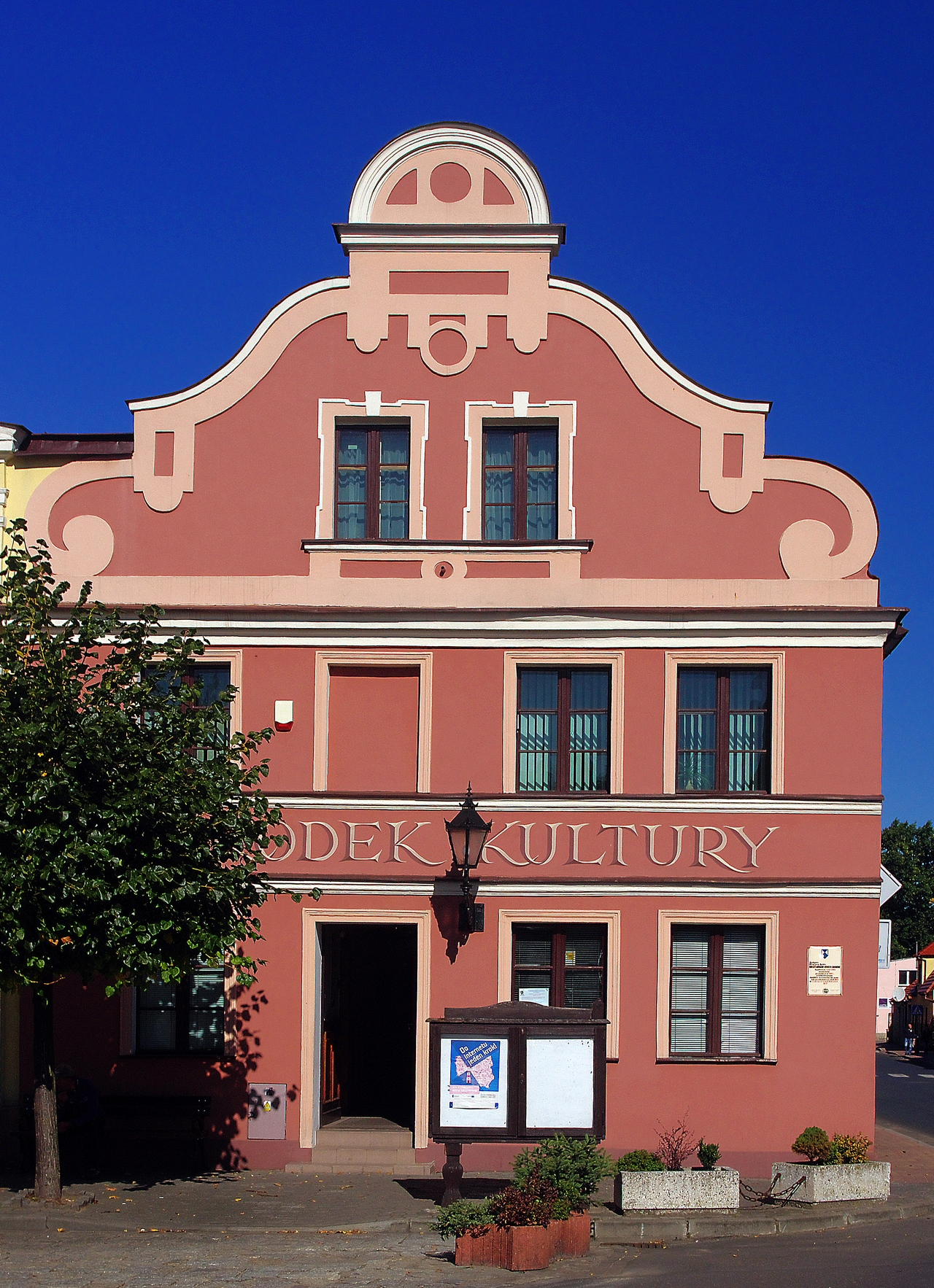
Culture Center

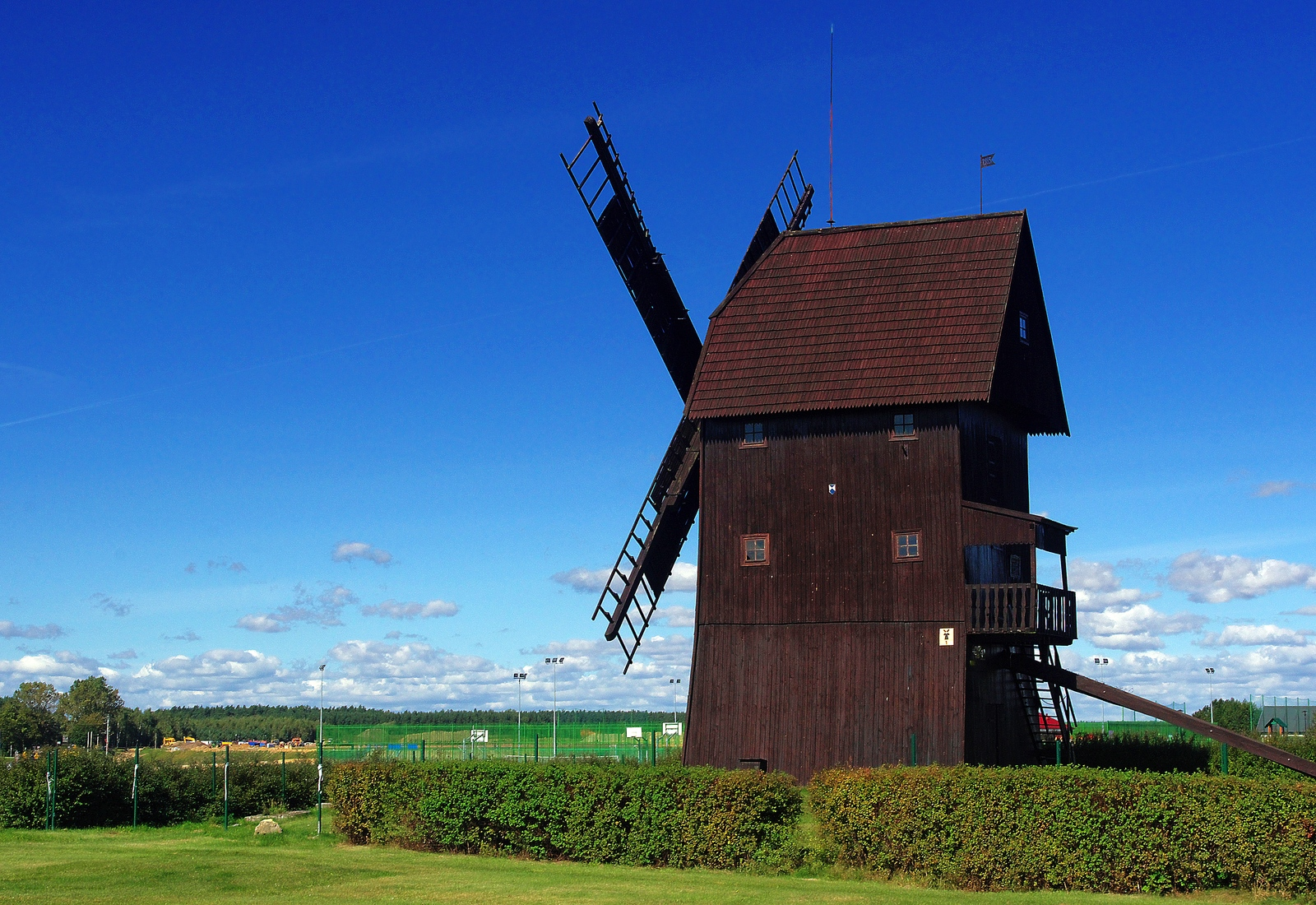
"Józef" windmill

== Transport ==
The S5 expressway bypasses Rydzyna to the west. Exit 48 of the expressway provides quick access to Poznań and to Wrocław.

Voivodeship road 309 passes right through Rydzyna.

Rydzyna has a station on the Poznań-Wrocław railway line.

== Notable residents ==
- Józef Sułkowski (1773–1798), Polish military officer and aide-de-camp to Napoleon Bonaparte
- Gustav Sorge (1911–1978), SS-guard at Esterwegen concentration camp
