= Antoni Sułkowski (chancellor) =

Last chancellor of Poland

Antoni Sułkowski (11 June 1735 – 16 April 1796) was a Polish statesman, voivode of Gniezno and Kalisz, lieutenant-general of the Crown army, 3rd ordynat of Rydzyna. Sułkowski served as the last Chancellor of Poland from 1793 to 1795.

Antoni Sułkowski was born on 11 June 1735 in Dresden. His father was Aleksander Józef Sułkowski and his mother Maria Anna Franiciszka Katarzyna née von Stain und Jettingen. He had a son, Antoni Paweł Sułkowski.
