= Antoni Paweł Sułkowski =

Polish division general and commander

Prince Antoni Paweł Sułkowski
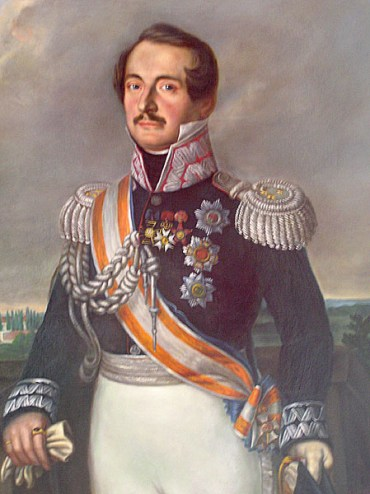
- Born: Antoni Paweł Sułkowski; 31 December 1785; Leszno, Polish–Lithuanian Commonwealth
- Died: 13 April 1836 (aged 50); Rydzyna, Poland (then part of the Prussian partition)
- Military career
- Allegiance: Duchy of Warsaw
- Service years: 1806–1818
- Rank: Division general
- Unit: Legia Poznanska
- Awards: Virtuti Militari; Légion d'honneur Order of the White Eagle

Prince Antoni Paweł Sułkowski (born 31 December 1785 in Leszno, died 13 April 1836 in Rydzyna), of the Sułkowski family, was a Polish division general (who also spent time in French service) and later overall commander of the armed forces of the Duchy of Warsaw.

== Napoleonic Wars ==
He began his military service in 1806 during the Wielkopolska Uprising when he personally funded the formation of the first regiment of Legia Poznanska (Poznań Legion), and took the command of the unit. He took part in the Napoleonic Wars and specifically, the first Polish campaign (1806–1807), where he fought with the French at the Siege of Gdańsk (Danzig) and Siege of Kołobrzeg (Kolberg). Between 1808 and 1809 he fought in Spain, including at the Battle of Almonacid and Battle of Ocana. He was appointed as the governor of Málaga, and in 1810 was promoted to Brigadier General.

In the 1812 War against Russia (which Napoleon referred to as his "Second Polish Campaign") he commanded a cavalry brigade in Count Józef Poniatowski's 5th Corps. The Polish poet and playwright Aleksander Fredro, who served under him, recalled that while Sułkowski was courageous and honorable, he had trouble acquiring the full confidence of his men, partly because he tended to use infantry tactics (Sułkowski's previous command) when in charge of a cavalry unit.

In the War of the Sixth Coalition he was a division general and led the 4th Cavalry Corps of Michał Sokolnicki. After the death of Poniatowski on 19 October 1813, Sułkowski was briefly the main commander of the Polish Corps, even though he was only twenty eight years old at the time. Sułkowski however, did not wish to fight outside of Poland again, and acting on behalf of his unit's sentiment, vowed that Polish troops would not cross the Rhine. After Napoleon made a personal appeal to Polish soldiers they became willing to follow the emperor which put Sułkowski in a difficult position; if he continued to lead his troops he would have to break the oath he made earlier. As a result, he submitted his resignation which was accepted by Napoleon and returned to Poland. The remaining Polish forces from then on were commanded by Jan Henryk Dąbrowski.

== Political activity in Congress Poland ==
After the Congress of Vienna Antoni supported Congress Poland (saying that it was a "small and poor version of Poland but Poland nonetheless, and it had that holy name") and Tsar Alexander I of Russia, even becoming his aide-de-camp in September 1815. However, by 1818 he became disillusioned with the political situation, lack of real autonomy or independence for the quasi-Polish state, and the tsar's refusal to join lands of the Russian partition to Congress Poland. As a result, he resigned his official posts and began focusing on personal matters.

In 1818 he settled permanently in Rydzyna (part of the Prussian partition of Poland) and became active in politics. Sułkowski was made a member of the Prussian State Council, by King Frederick William and later was a Marshall of the Sejm of the Grand Duchy of Posen and participated in the two founding sejms of the grand duchy in 1827 and 1830. As a prominent politician in the Grand Duchy he tried to protect the use of Polish language and Polish education against forced Germanization and discrimination by the Prussian authorities.

During the November Uprising against Russia in Congress Poland in 1830, Sułkowski considered joining the insurrection but made a condition of his involvement that he be given his own separate military unit to command. However, personal and family considerations precluded him from following through on this commitment. Nonetheless after the uprising was suppressed he actively campaigned against repression of the insurrectionists and advocated for a general amnesty.

He received the Cavalier's Cross Virtuti Militari as well as the Officer's Cross of Légion d'honneur.

== Personal life ==
He was the son of Voivode of Kalisz Antoni Sułkowski (1735–1796) and Karolina Bubna-Littitz, from a Germanized Czech House of Bubna-Litic. His father was an associate of the Russian general and ambassador, Nicholas Repnin, who was sent to Poland by Catherine the Great. During the Sejm of the First Partition, the elder Sułkowski actively supported Russian, Prussian and Austrian partition of Poland and for his service was awarded Order of St. Andrew by Empress Catherine the Great of Russia. Unlike his parents, however, the younger Sułkowski became a Polish patriot, supposedly after witnessing the Warsaw Uprising of 1794 against Russian rule as an eight-year-old.

He studied in Wrocław and at the University of Göttingen.

In 1808 he married Ewa Kicka, the daughter of Onufry Kicki, the former Chamberlain to the last king of Poland, Stanisław August Poniatowski. The couple had three daughters; Helena (married Count Henryk Potocki), Ewa (married Count Władysław Potocki) and Teresa (married Henryk Wodzicki) and one son, Antoni, who married Maria Mycielska (Antoni's wife Ewa died soon after childbirth).

In 1836 he caught scarlet fever from one of his children and died. He was buried in a family crypt in the Church of Saint Stanisław in Rydzyna.

== Commemoration ==
Today, in the city of Kołobrzeg a major street is named after Sułkowski in commemoration of his part in the Siege of the city in 1807. There are also streets and plazas, as well as schools named after him throughout Poland, including in his home town of Rydzyna.
