= Aleksander Józef Sułkowski =

Polish general and politician (1695–1762)

Alexander Joseph Sulkowski
- Aleksander Józef Sułkowski
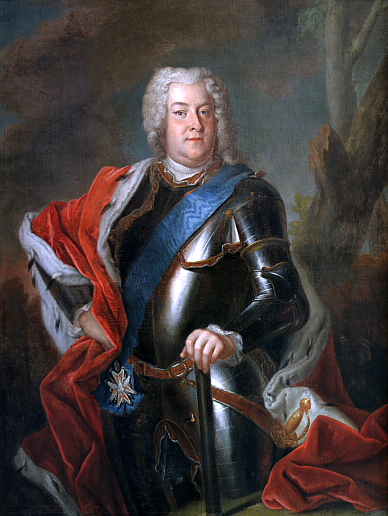
- Born: 15 March 1695; Kraków, Poland
- Died: 21 May 1762 (aged 67); Leszno, Poland

Aleksander Józef Sułkowski (15 March 1695 – 21 May 1762) was a Polish general and the progenitor of the Sułkowski noble line. He was politically active in Poland, the Polish–Lithuanian Commonwealth and in the Electorate of Saxony.

Born in Kraków, Sulkowski was a favourite protégé of king Augustus III of Poland and acted as his Minister of State in Saxony from 1733 to 1738. He was created a Count of the Holy Roman Empire in 1733, and elevated to the rank of Prince of Bielsko by Empress Maria Theresa of Austria in 1754. According to some sources, Alexander Joseph was an illegitimate son born to Elżbieta Szalewska and king Augustus II the Strong, making him Augustus III's half-brother. Elżbieta's husband, Stanisław Sułkowski, gave Alexander Joseph his last name.

On 31 October 1728, Sulkowski married Baroness Marie Franciszka von Stain zu Jettingen (2 February 1712 – 16 November 1741). They had eight children. In 1743, he married Countess Anna Przebendowska (25 July 1721 – 1795), with whom he had four children. Sulkowski died 21 May 1762, aged 67, in Leszno, Poland.

== Notable purchases ==
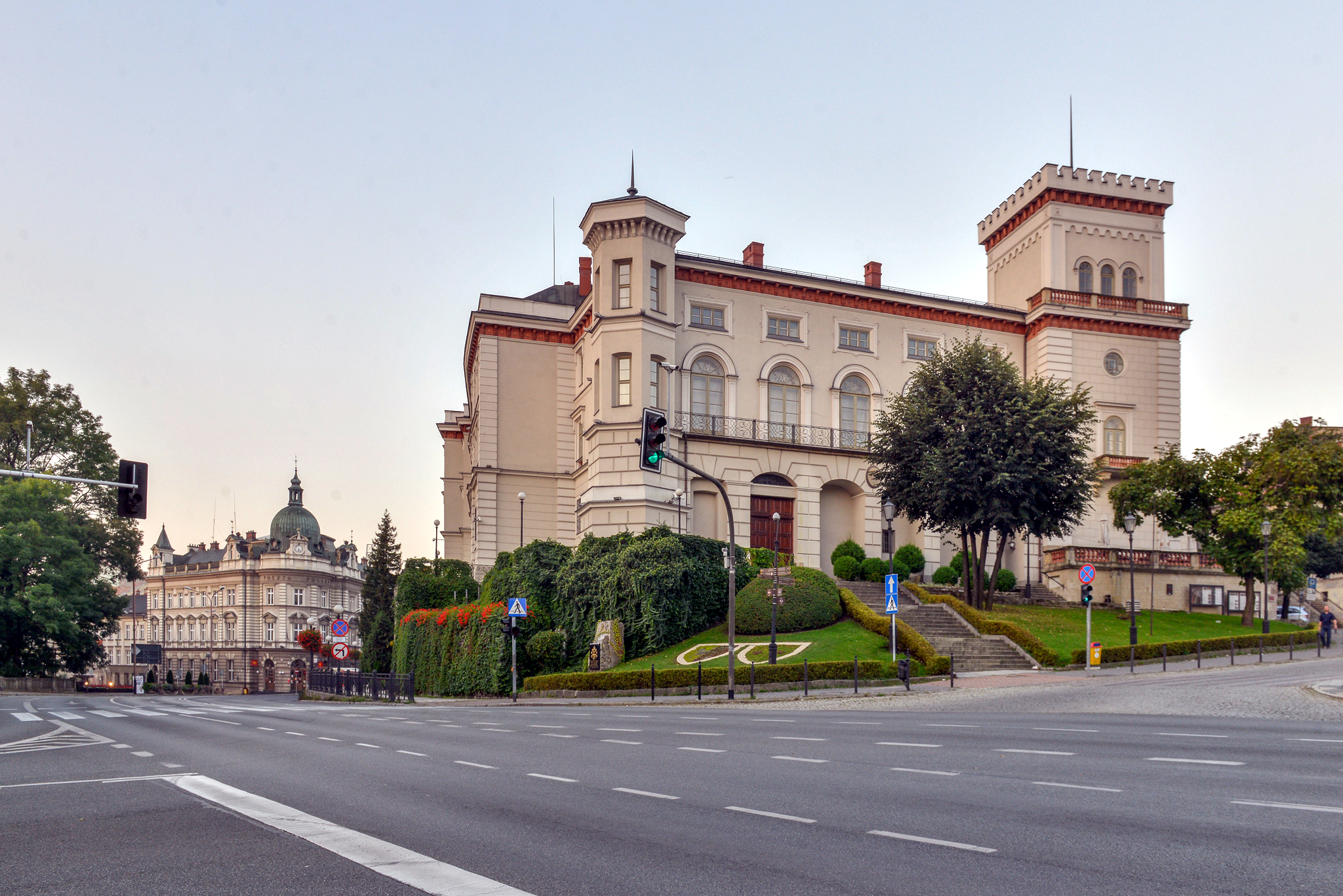
The Sułkowski Castle in Bielsko-Biała, Poland

In 1738, Sulkowski purchased the Leszczyński estates of Rydzyna and neighboring areas, not far from Leszno. In 1752, he purchased the Sułkowski Castle in Bielsko-Biała (in Cieszyn Silesia) and its surroundings together with goods for 600,000 florins from Jan Sunnegh.

Sulkowski commissioned a large and exquisite Meissen porcelain service, made between 1735 and 1738 by famed sculptor Johann Joachim Kändler. Many of the porcelain pieces featured his personal monograph and coat of arms.

== See also ==
- Osier pattern
- Rydzyna Castle
